= List of stars in Lupus =

This is the list of notable stars in the constellation Lupus, sorted by decreasing brightness.

| Name | B | F | Var | HD | HIP | RA | Dec | vis. mag. | abs. mag. | Dist. (ly) | Sp. class | Notes |
|---|---|---|---|---|---|---|---|---|---|---|---|---|
| α Lup | α | | | 129056 | 71860 | 14^{h} 41^{m} 55.77^{s} | −47° 23′ 17.3″ | 2.30 | −3.83 | 548 | B1.5III | Uridim; β Cep variable, V_{max} = 2.29^{m}, V_{min} = 2.34^{m}, P = 0.2598466 d. 70% likelihood of being a member of Scorpius–Centaurus association. |
| β Lup | β | | | 132058 | 73273 | 14^{h} 58^{m} 31.95^{s} | −43° 08′ 01.9″ | 2.68 | −3.35 | 523 | B2III | Kekouan |
| γ Lup | γ | | | 138690 | 76297 | 15^{h} 35^{m} 08.46^{s} | −41° 10′ 00.1″ | 2.80 | −3.40 | 567 | B2IV | rotating ellipsoidal variable. 91% likelihood of being a member of Scorpius–Centaurus association. |
| δ Lup | δ | | | 136298 | 75141 | 15^{h} 21^{m} 22.34^{s} | −40° 38′ 50.9″ | 3.22 | −2.75 | 510 | B1.5IV | β Cep variable, V_{max} = 3.2^{m}, V_{min} = 3.24^{m}, P = 0.16547 d |
| ε Lup | ε | | | 136504 | 75264 | 15^{h} 22^{m} 40.89^{s} | −44° 41′ 22.5″ | 3.37 | −2.58 | 504 | B2IV-V | β Cep variable, V_{max} = 3.36^{m}, V_{min} = 3.38^{m}, P = 0.0965 d |
| ζ Lup | ζ | | | 134505 | 74395 | 15^{h} 12^{m} 17.20^{s} | −52° 05′ 56.7″ | 3.41 | 0.65 | 116 | G8III | |
| η Lup | η | | | 143118 | 78384 | 16^{h} 00^{m} 07.34^{s} | −38° 23′ 47.9″ | 3.42 | −2.48 | 493 | B2.5IV | suspected variable |
| ι Lup | ι | | | 125238 | 69996 | 14^{h} 19^{m} 24.23^{s} | −46° 03′ 29.1″ | 3.55 | −1.61 | 352 | B2.5IV | β Cep variable, V_{max} = 3.54^{m}, V_{min} = 3.55^{m} |
| φ^{1} Lup | φ^{1} | | | 136422 | 75177 | 15^{h} 21^{m} 48.44^{s} | −36° 15′ 40.2″ | 3.57 | −1.43 | 326 | K5III | variable star, ΔV = 0.008^{m}, P = 4.81719 d |
| κ^{1} Lup | κ^{1} | | | 134481 | 74376 | 15^{h} 11^{m} 56.16^{s} | −48° 44′ 15.7″ | 3.88 | 0.14 | 182 | B9V | Qízhènjiāngjūn (騎陣將軍) |
| π Lup | π | | | 133242 | 73807 | 15^{h} 05^{m} 07.11^{s} | −47° 03′ 04.3″ | 3.91 | −2.01 | 497 | B5 | |
| χ Lup | χ | 5 | | 141556 | 77634 | 15^{h} 50^{m} 57.54^{s} | −33° 37′ 37.6″ | 3.97 | −0.03 | 206 | B9.5III-IV | |
| ρ Lup | ρ | | | 128345 | 71536 | 14^{h} 37^{m} 53.25^{s} | −49° 25′ 32.7″ | 4.05 | −0.84 | 310 | B5V | 53 Per variable, V_{max} = 4.04^{m}, V_{min} = 4.05^{m}, P = 0.44527 d |
| λ Lup | λ | | | 133955 | 74117 | 15^{h} 08^{m} 50.63^{s} | −45° 16′ 47.3″ | 4.07 | −1.41 | 406 | B3V | |
| θ Lup | θ | | | 144294 | 78918 | 16^{h} 06^{m} 35.56^{s} | −36° 48′ 08.0″ | 4.22 | −1.28 | 411 | B2.5Vn | suspected variable |
| μ Lup | μ | | | 135734 | 74911 | 15^{h} 18^{m} 32.05^{s} | −47° 52′ 30.7″ | 4.27 | −0.48 | 291 | B8V | |
| ο Lup | ο | | | 130807 | 72683 | 14^{h} 51^{m} 38.32^{s} | −43° 34′ 31.1″ | 4.32 | −1.16 | 408 | B5IV | suspected variable, ΔV = 0.02^{m} |
| τ^{2} Lup | τ^{2} | | | 126354 | 70576 | 14^{h} 26^{m} 10.80^{s} | −45° 22′ 45.3″ | 4.33 | −0.59 | 314 | A7:+... | |
| ω Lup | ω | | | 139127 | 76552 | 15^{h} 38^{m} 03.32^{s} | −42° 34′ 02.9″ | 4.34 | 0.10 | 230 | K4.5III | |
| 2 Lup | f | 2 | | 135758 | 74857 | 15^{h} 17^{m} 49.84^{s} | −30° 08′ 55.2″ | 4.35 | −0.53 | 308 | K1II/III | |
| σ Lup | σ | | | 127381 | 71121 | 14^{h} 32^{m} 37.08^{s} | −50° 27′ 25.6″ | 4.44 | −1.79 | 574 | B2III | SX Ari variable, V_{max} = 4.42^{m}, V_{min} = 4.44^{m}, P = 3.01927 d |
| φ^{2} Lup | φ^{2} | | | 136664 | 75304 | 15^{h} 23^{m} 09.36^{s} | −36° 51′ 30.4″ | 4.54 | −1.81 | 606 | B4V | |
| KT Lup | d | | KT | 138769 | 76371 | 15^{h} 35^{m} 53.27^{s} | −44° 57′ 30.0″ | 4.55 | −1.07 | 434 | B3IVp | Be star |
| τ^{1} Lup | τ^{1} | | | 126341 | 70574 | 14^{h} 26^{m} 08.24^{s} | −45° 13′ 17.0″ | 4.56 | −2.95 | 1035 | B2IV | β Cep variable, V_{max} = 4.54^{m}, V_{min} = 4.58^{m}, P = 0.17738884 d |
| HD 137058 | k | | | 137058 | 75501 | 15^{h} 25^{m} 20.25^{s} | −38° 44′ 00.9″ | 4.60 | −0.70 | 374 | A0V | |
| HD 139664 | g | | | 139664 | 76829 | 15^{h} 41^{m} 11.52^{s} | −44° 39′ 38.0″ | 4.64 | 3.42 | 57 | F5IV-V | |
| ψ^{1} Lup | ψ^{1} | 3 | | 139521 | 76705 | 15^{h} 39^{m} 45.97^{s} | −34° 24′ 42.8″ | 4.66 | 0.28 | 245 | G8/K0III | |
| ψ^{2} Lup | ψ^{2} | 4 | | 140008 | 76945 | 15^{h} 42^{m} 41.04^{s} | −34° 42′ 37.2″ | 4.75 | −0.67 | 396 | B5V | |
| HD 125442 | | | | 125442 | 70104 | 14^{h} 20^{m} 42.55^{s} | −45° 11′ 12.8″ | 4.78 | 1.49 | 149 | F0IV | suspected variable |
| HD 134687 | e | | | 134687 | 74449 | 15^{h} 12^{m} 49.60^{s} | −44° 30′ 01.3″ | 4.83 | −0.89 | 454 | B3IV | suspected slow irregular variable |
| HD 143699 | | | | 143699 | 78655 | 16^{h} 03^{m} 24.20^{s} | −38° 36′ 08.9″ | 4.90 | −1.14 | 527 | B6III/IV | suspected variable |
| 1 Lup | i | 1 | | 135153 | 74604 | 15^{h} 14^{m} 37.33^{s} | −31° 31′ 08.9″ | 4.91 | −2.81 | 1140 | F3III | |
| ν^{1} Lup | ν^{1} | | | 136351 | 75206 | 15^{h} 22^{m} 08.39^{s} | −47° 55′ 38.9″ | 4.99 | 2.32 | 111 | F8V | |
| HD 143009 | | | | 143009 | 78323 | 15^{h} 59^{m} 30.30^{s} | −41° 44′ 39.8″ | 4.99 | −0.34 | 380 | G8III | |
| HD 133340 | | | | 133340 | 73826 | 15^{h} 05^{m} 19.15^{s} | −41° 04′ 02.0″ | 5.13 | −0.13 | 367 | G8III | |
| ξ^{1} Lup | ξ^{1} | | | 142629 | 78105 | 15^{h} 56^{m} 53.48^{s} | −33° 57′ 57.7″ | 5.14 | 1.21 | 199 | A3V | |
| HD 135345 | l | | | 135345 | 74707 | 15^{h} 16^{m} 04.03^{s} | −41° 29′ 28.1″ | 5.15 | −2.83 | 1283 | F:+... | |
| HD 129893 | b | | | 129893 | 72290 | 14^{h} 47^{m} 01.31^{s} | −52° 22′ 59.9″ | 5.22 | 0.72 | 259 | G6III | |
| HD 139980 | h | | | 139980 | 76939 | 15^{h} 42^{m} 38.35^{s} | −37° 25′ 29.6″ | 5.23 | 0.63 | 271 | G8/K0III | |
| HD 137709 | | | | 137709 | 75828 | 15^{h} 29^{m} 24.28^{s} | −46° 43′ 57.7″ | 5.26 | −1.91 | 886 | K4III | suspected variable |
| υ Lup | υ | | | 136933 | 75439 | 15^{h} 24^{m} 45.03^{s} | −39° 42′ 36.5″ | 5.36 | 0.00 | 384 | Ap... | |
| HD 126983 | | | | 126983 | 70931 | 14^{h} 30^{m} 20.99^{s} | −49° 31′ 08.1″ | 5.38 | 1.21 | 222 | A1V | suspected variable |
| HD 131562 | c | | | 131562 | 73095 | 14^{h} 56^{m} 17.23^{s} | −52° 48′ 34.4″ | 5.38 | 1.27 | 216 | A2III | |
| HD 128266 | a | | | 128266 | 71500 | 14^{h} 37^{m} 20.17^{s} | −46° 08′ 00.3″ | 5.39 | −2.67 | 1336 | K0III | |
| HD 138816 | | | | 138816 | 76397 | 15^{h} 36^{m} 12.14^{s} | −44° 23′ 48.1″ | 5.44 | −1.09 | 659 | M0III | suspected variable |
| HD 132955 | | | | 132955 | 73624 | 15^{h} 02^{m} 59.29^{s} | −32° 38′ 35.7″ | 5.45 | 0.30 | 350 | B3V | |
| HD 134270 | | | | 134270 | 74305 | 15^{h} 11^{m} 15.98^{s} | −55° 20′ 45.7″ | 5.45 | −3.52 | 2025 | G2Ib/II | |
| HD 137432 | | | | 137432 | 75647 | 15^{h} 27^{m} 18.14^{s} | −36° 46′ 03.0″ | 5.46 | −0.08 | 418 | B5V | |
| HD 126981 | | | | 126981 | 70915 | 14^{h} 30^{m} 08.66^{s} | −45° 19′ 16.6″ | 5.51 | −0.31 | 477 | B8Vn | suspected variable |
| HD 128068 | | | | 128068 | 71419 | 14^{h} 36^{m} 19.06^{s} | −46° 14′ 43.8″ | 5.54 | −0.90 | 637 | K3III | suspected variable, ΔV = 0.04^{m} |
| HD 125383 | | | | 125383 | 70054 | 14^{h} 20^{m} 09.71^{s} | −43° 03′ 31.9″ | 5.55 | 0.19 | 384 | G8III | |
| GG Lup | | | GG | 135876 | 74950 | 15^{h} 18^{m} 56.39^{s} | −40° 47′ 17.4″ | 5.59 | −0.40 | 514 | B9V | β Lyr variable |
| ξ^{2} Lup | ξ^{2} | | | 142630 | 78106 | 15^{h} 56^{m} 54.11^{s} | −33° 57′ 51.0″ | 5.59 | 1.70 | 196 | B9V | |
| HD 140784 | | | | 140784 | 77286 | 15^{h} 46^{m} 44.23^{s} | −34° 40′ 56.6″ | 5.61 | 0.23 | 388 | B8V | |
| HD 131657 | | | | 131657 | 73111 | 14^{h} 56^{m} 32.08^{s} | −47° 52′ 44.9″ | 5.62 | −0.80 | 626 | B+... | |
| ν^{2} Lup | ν^{2} | | | 136352 | 75181 | 15^{h} 21^{m} 49.57^{s} | −48° 19′ 01.1″ | 5.65 | 4.83 | 47 | G2V | has three planets (b, c & d) |
| κ^{2} Lup | κ^{2} | | | 134482 | 74380 | 15^{h} 11^{m} 57.77^{s} | −48° 44′ 36.9″ | 5.70 | 1.84 | 193 | A3IV | |
| HD 144415 | | | | 144415 | 78970 | 16^{h} 07^{m} 16.17^{s} | −36° 45′ 19.9″ | 5.72 | 2.14 | 170 | F0/F2V | |
| HD 129858 | m | | | 129858 | 72250 | 14^{h} 46^{m} 29.03^{s} | −47° 26′ 27.9″ | 5.74 | 0.65 | 340 | A1V | |
| HD 133880 | | | HR | 133880 | 74066 | 15^{h} 08^{m} 12.15^{s} | −40° 35′ 01.9″ | 5.79 | 0.24 | 413 | B8IV Si | SX Ari variable, V_{max} = 5.76^{m}, V_{min} = 5.81^{m}, P = 0.877476 d |
| HD 133631 | | | | 133631 | 74006 | 15^{h} 07^{m} 25.93^{s} | −49° 05′ 19.1″ | 5.77 | 0.62 | 349 | G8III | |
| HD 142691 | | | | 142691 | 78142 | 15^{h} 57^{m} 21.33^{s} | −36° 11′ 07.1″ | 5.78 | −1.49 | 929 | K0/K1III+.. | |
| HD 138505 | | | | 138505 | 76207 | 15^{h} 34^{m} 01.74^{s} | −40° 03′ 58.9″ | 5.82 | −2.71 | 1655 | M2III | suspected semiregular variable |
| HD 126504 | | | | 126504 | 70663 | 14^{h} 27^{m} 12.30^{s} | −46° 08′ 02.6″ | 5.83 | 2.00 | 190 | Am | suspected variable |
| HD 133937 | | | | 133937 | 74100 | 15^{h} 08^{m} 39.21^{s} | −42° 52′ 04.3″ | 5.85 | 0.18 | 444 | B7V | |
| HD 127501 | | | | 127501 | 71182 | 14^{h} 33^{m} 29.97^{s} | −52° 40′ 46.1″ | 5.86 | 0.76 | 341 | K0III | |
| HD 127486 | | | | 127486 | 71184 | 14^{h} 33^{m} 32.47^{s} | −54° 59′ 55.0″ | 5.86 | 1.15 | 285 | F6IV-V | |
| HD 143928 | | | | 143928 | 78747 | 16^{h} 04^{m} 36.91^{s} | −37° 51′ 45.6″ | 5.91 | 2.91 | 130 | F3V | |
| HD 140285 | | | | 140285 | 77086 | 15^{h} 44^{m} 22.69^{s} | −41° 49′ 08.5″ | 5.93 | 0.18 | 461 | A0V + B | suspected variable |
| HD 135235 | | | | 135235 | 74696 | 15^{h} 15^{m} 53.66^{s} | −48° 04′ 25.1″ | 5.96 | 2.39 | 169 | A3m | |
| HD 133652 | | | HZ | 133652 | 73937 | 15^{h} 06^{m} 33.21^{s} | −30° 55′ 06.3″ | 5.96 | 1.06 | 312 | Ap Si | α^{2} CVn variable |
| HD 134255 | | | | 134255 | 74224 | 15^{h} 10^{m} 07.34^{s} | −38° 47′ 32.9″ | 5.98 | 0.20 | 467 | G6III | |
| HD 125869 | | | | 125869 | 70363 | 14^{h} 23^{m} 48.64^{s} | −53° 10′ 34.4″ | 5.99 | 0.85 | 348 | K1III | |
| HD 143790 | | | | 143790 | 78665 | 16^{h} 03^{m} 34.38^{s} | −32° 00′ 01.7″ | 6.00 | 2.31 | 178 | F5IV/V | |
| HD 140901 | | | | 140901 | 77358 | 15^{h} 47^{m} 29.41^{s} | −37° 54′ 56.9″ | 6.01 | 5.09 | 50 | G6IV | |
| HD 125810 | | | | 125810 | 70325 | 14^{h} 23^{m} 20.26^{s} | −50° 46′ 20.0″ | 6.03 | −0.93 | 803 | K2III | |
| HD 142448 | | | | 142448 | 78046 | 15^{h} 56^{m} 06.84^{s} | −39° 51′ 51.6″ | 6.04 | −0.40 | 632 | B9V | |
| HD 135348 | | | | 135348 | 74716 | 15^{h} 16^{m} 10.47^{s} | −43° 29′ 05.9″ | 6.05 | −1.14 | 893 | B3IV | suspected variable, V_{max} = 6.04^{m}, V_{min} = 6.06^{m} |
| HD 139271 | | | | 139271 | 76608 | 15^{h} 38^{m} 42.17^{s} | −39° 07′ 39.9″ | 6.05 | −0.37 | 626 | A4:m... | |
| HD 128582 | | | | 128582 | 71639 | 14^{h} 39^{m} 11.01^{s} | −46° 35′ 02.2″ | 6.06 | 3.28 | 117 | F7V | |
| HX Lup | | | HX | 125721 | 70270 | 14^{h} 22^{m} 38.72^{s} | −48° 19′ 11.4″ | 6.06 | −3.25 | 2415 | B1III | rotating ellipsoidal variable, ΔV = 0.06^{m}, P = 3.08809 d |
| HD 129932 | | | | 129932 | 72308 | 14^{h} 47^{m} 12.59^{s} | −52° 12′ 18.9″ | 6.07 | −3.28 | 2415 | A1III/IV | |
| HD 134837 | | | | 134837 | 74479 | 15^{h} 13^{m} 07.68^{s} | −36° 05′ 28.9″ | 6.09 | 0.86 | 362 | B8V | |
| HD 132242 | | | | 132242 | 73354 | 14^{h} 59^{m} 27.20^{s} | −43° 09′ 35.3″ | 6.10 | −2.61 | 1801 | F5III | |
| HD 137465 | | | | 137465 | 75742 | 15^{h} 28^{m} 27.21^{s} | −51° 35′ 52.5″ | 6.10 | −2.21 | 1495 | G2Ib | |
| HD 143902 | | | | 143902 | 78726 | 16^{h} 04^{m} 17.84^{s} | −33° 12′ 49.1″ | 6.12 | 0.65 | 400 | F3III | suspected variable, ΔV = 0.03^{m} |
| HD 135896 | | | | 135896 | 74929 | 15^{h} 18^{m} 41.31^{s} | −31° 12′ 33.6″ | 6.18 | −1.25 | 997 | G6/G8III | |
| HD 136014 | | | | 136014 | 75003 | 15^{h} 19^{m} 31.78^{s} | −37° 05′ 48.5″ | 6.19 | 0.83 | 385 | G8III/IV | |
| HD 136334 | | | | 136334 | 75164 | 15^{h} 21^{m} 35.31^{s} | −40° 44′ 57.9″ | 6.21 | 1.26 | 319 | A1V | |
| HD 139599 | | | | 139599 | 76809 | 15^{h} 40^{m} 58.26^{s} | −47° 44′ 09.6″ | 6.21 | −0.95 | 883 | K5/M0III | variable star, ΔV = 0.007^{m}, P = 100.70493 d |
| HD 142407 | (g^{2}) | | | 142407 | 77985 | 15^{h} 55^{m} 30.52^{s} | −31° 05′ 01.3″ | 6.21 | 0.79 | 396 | K4III | |
| HD 143248 | | | | 143248 | 78445 | 16^{h} 00^{m} 53.70^{s} | −40° 26′ 08.0″ | 6.21 | 0.93 | 370 | A0V | |
| HD 137919 | | | | 137919 | 75915 | 15^{h} 30^{m} 21.31^{s} | −41° 55′ 08.3″ | 6.23 | 0.29 | 503 | B9V | |
| HD 138204 | | | | 138204 | 76063 | 15^{h} 32^{m} 04.22^{s} | −38° 37′ 20.5″ | 6.23 | 2.58 | 175 | A3III | |
| HD 138923 | | | | 138923 | 76395 | 15^{h} 36^{m} 11.38^{s} | −33° 05′ 33.9″ | 6.26 | 1.00 | 367 | B8/B9V | |
| HD 133550 | | | | 133550 | 73901 | 15^{h} 06^{m} 13.95^{s} | −36° 15′ 52.5″ | 6.27 | −1.84 | 1364 | K5III | |
| HD 142542 | (g^{1}) | | | 142542 | 78058 | 15^{h} 56^{m} 14.00^{s} | −31° 47′ 09.2″ | 6.29 | 2.77 | 165 | F3/F5V | |
| HD 130073 | | | | 130073 | 72338 | 14^{h} 47^{m} 32.11^{s} | −43° 33′ 24.4″ | 6.30 | −0.06 | 609 | K1III | |
| HD 135730 | | | | 135730 | 74875 | 15^{h} 18^{m} 09.39^{s} | −41° 03′ 40.1″ | 6.30 | 1.78 | 262 | Am | |
| HD 142889 | | | | 142889 | 78236 | 15^{h} 58^{m} 30.81^{s} | −37° 30′ 13.8″ | 6.31 | −0.06 | 612 | K0III | |
| HD 134597 | | | | 134597 | 74418 | 15^{h} 12^{m} 31.23^{s} | −48° 13′ 08.0″ | 6.32 | 0.52 | 471 | K2III | |
| HD 143404 | | | | 143404 | 78486 | 16^{h} 01^{m} 19.55^{s} | −31° 53′ 20.9″ | 6.33 | 0.20 | 550 | K4III | |
| HD 131923 | | | | 131923 | 73241 | 14^{h} 58^{m} 08.81^{s} | −48° 51′ 43.9″ | 6.34 | 4.39 | 80 | G5V | |
| HD 139613 | | | | 139613 | 76739 | 15^{h} 40^{m} 15.56^{s} | −31° 12′ 49.3″ | 6.35 | −0.10 | 635 | K3III | |
| HD 138564 | | | | 138564 | 76234 | 15^{h} 34^{m} 20.87^{s} | −39° 20′ 56.8″ | 6.36 | 1.12 | 364 | B9V | |
| HD 128617 | | | | 128617 | 71658 | 14^{h} 39^{m} 24.64^{s} | −49° 03′ 18.1″ | 6.37 | 2.64 | 182 | F3IV | |
| GM Lup | | | GM | 133220 | 73764 | 15^{h} 04^{m} 42.90^{s} | −40° 51′ 40.5″ | 6.38 | −0.18 | 640 | M6III | semiregular variable, V_{max} = 6.38^{m}, V_{min} = 6.7^{m} |
| HD 141832 | | | | 141832 | 77729 | 15^{h} 52^{m} 12.89^{s} | −29° 53′ 10.8″ | 6.38 | 1.86 | 263 | K0III | suspected variable, ΔV = 0.07^{m} |
| HD 126759 | | | | 126759 | 70809 | 14^{h} 28^{m} 51.93^{s} | −47° 59′ 31.3″ | 6.40 | 0.51 | 491 | Ap... | suspected variable |
| HD 133518 | | | | 133518 | 73966 | 15^{h} 06^{m} 55.97^{s} | −52° 01′ 47.1″ | 6.40 | −1.07 | 1016 | B3III | |
| HD 138395 | | | | 138395 | 76165 | 15^{h} 33^{m} 24.29^{s} | −40° 29′ 26.5″ | 6.40 | 0.04 | 610 | K0III | |
| HD 125809 | | | | 125809 | 70320 | 14^{h} 23^{m} 15.36^{s} | −47° 25′ 01.0″ | 6.41 | −3.57 | 3228 | G5Ib | |
| HD 140861 | | | | 140861 | 77350 | 15^{h} 47^{m} 25.64^{s} | −40° 11′ 38.8″ | 6.41 | 0.89 | 414 | G8III/IVp.. | |
| HD 126093 | | | | 126093 | 70451 | 14^{h} 24^{m} 40.84^{s} | −44° 18′ 39.7″ | 6.43 | 0.53 | 494 | K0/K1III | |
| HD 129624 | | | | 129624 | 72135 | 14^{h} 45^{m} 18.85^{s} | −51° 18′ 53.6″ | 6.44 | −1.23 | 1116 | K4III | |
| HD 134444 | | | | 134444 | 74336 | 15^{h} 11^{m} 34.82^{s} | −45° 16′ 39.0″ | 6.44 | 1.06 | 389 | K1III | |
| HD 135468 | | | | 135468 | 74775 | 15^{h} 16^{m} 55.08^{s} | −46° 12′ 08.3″ | 6.44 | 2.81 | 174 | F6V | |
| HD 137785 | | | | 137785 | 75818 | 15^{h} 29^{m} 19.30^{s} | −38° 38′ 05.4″ | 6.44 | 2.44 | 205 | F2V | |
| HD 135430 | | | | 135430 | 74769 | 15^{h} 16^{m} 51.84^{s} | −47° 51′ 52.2″ | 6.46 | 0.27 | 565 | G8III | |
| HD 133469 | | | | 133469 | 73850 | 15^{h} 05^{m} 33.90^{s} | −30° 33′ 03.8″ | 6.48 | 3.96 | 104 | F6V | |
| HD 133399 | | | | 133399 | 73881 | 15^{h} 06^{m} 02.42^{s} | −48° 53′ 00.1″ | 6.48 | −2.11 | 1707 | B3V | |
| HD 128154 | | | | 128154 | 71494 | 14^{h} 37^{m} 12.43^{s} | −53° 03′ 38.7″ | 6.49 | −0.20 | 710 | K2/K3III | |
| HD 136607 | | | | 136607 | 75324 | 15^{h} 23^{m} 25.00^{s} | −46° 08′ 25.4″ | 6.49 | 0.58 | 495 | G8III | |
| HD 138221 | | | | 138221 | 76048 | 15^{h} 31^{m} 50.24^{s} | −32° 52′ 51.8″ | 6.49 | 0.77 | 453 | B6/B7V | |
| HIP 74890 | | | | 135760 | 74890 | 15^{h} 18^{m} 17.0^{s} | −41° 25′ 14″ | 7.05 | | 299 | K1III | has a planet (b) |
| HD 126525 | | | | 126525 | 70695 | 14^{h} 27^{m} 33^{s} | −51° 55′ 59″ | 7.85 | | 124 | G4V | has a planet (b) |
| HD 141943 | | | NZ | 141943 | | 15^{h} 53^{m} 27.30^{s} | −42° 16′ 00.7″ | 7.98 | | | G2 | BY Dra variable, ΔV = 0.061^{m}, P = 2.2194 d |
| HD 142527 | | | | 142527 | 78092 | 15^{h} 56^{m} 41.89^{s} | −42° 19′ 23.3″ | 8.34 | | 760 | F6III | has a circumstellar disk |
| EX Lup | | | EX | 325367 | | 16^{h} 03^{m} 05.49^{s} | −40° 18′ 25.4″ | 8.50 | | | M0 | prototype EXor, V_{max} = 8.5^{m}, V_{min} = 14.3^{m} |
| SAO 206462 | | | | 135344B | | 15^{h} 15^{m} 48.44^{s} | −37° 09′ 16.0″ | 8.71 | | | F8V | has a circumstellar disk |
| HD 135778 | | | | 135778 | 74865 | 15^{h} 17^{m} 56.0^{s} | −30° 28′ 41″ | 9.00 | | 375 | F3V | has a planet (b) |
| FW Lup | | | FW | 136483 | 75234 | 15^{h} 22^{m} 25.38^{s} | −40° 55′ 36.2″ | 9.05 | | 2080 | F5IV | RR Lyr variable, V_{max} = 8.814^{m}, V_{min} = 9.200^{m}, P = 0.4841702 d |
| Gliese 588 | | | | | 76074 | 15^{h} 32^{m} 12.93^{s} | −41° 16′ 32.1″ | 9.31 | | 19.329 | M2.5V | suspected variable |
| FT Lup | | | FT | 132316 | | 14^{h} 59^{m} 52.69^{s} | −42° 58′ 59.1″ | 9.82 | | | F0+K2V | β Lyr variable |
| WASP-178 | | | | | | 15^{h} 09^{m} 05.0^{s} | −42° 42′ 18″ | 9.95 | | 1363 | A1IV-V | has a transiting planet (b) |
| RY Lup | | | RY | | 78317 | 15^{h} 59^{m} 28.38^{s} | −40° 21′ 51.3″ | 10.2 | | 422 | G0V: | UX Ori star, V_{max} = 10.2^{m}, V_{min} = 13.3^{m}, P = 3.80 d |
| HIP 70849 | | | | | 70849 | 14^{h} 29^{m} 18.56^{s} | −46° 27′ 49.7″ | 10.4 | 8.50 | 78 | K7Vk | has a planet (b) |
| RU Lup | | | RU | 142560 | 78094 | 15^{h} 56^{m} 42.31^{s} | −37° 49′ 15.5″ | 10.51 | | 393 | G5V:e | T Tau star |
| GQ Lup | | | GQ | | | 15^{h} 49^{m} 12.14^{s} | −35° 39′ 04.0″ | 11.40 | | 500 | K7V | T Tau star, V_{max} = 11.4^{m}, V_{min} = 12.7^{m}, P = 8.4 d; has a planet or a brown dwarf (b) |
| He 2-113 | | | | | 73391 | 14^{h} 59^{m} 53.48^{s} | −54° 18′ 07.5″ | 11.88 | | | WC10 | protoplanetary nebula |
| WASP-132 | | | | | | 14^{h} 30^{m} 26.0^{s} | −46° 09′ 33″ | 12.4 | | 391 | K4 | has a transiting planet (b) |
| NY Lup | | | NY | | | 15^{h} 48^{m} 14.60^{s} | −45° 28′ 39.9″ | 14.50 | | | K+DA:... | DQ Her variable, V_{max} = 14.50^{m}, V_{min} = 14.78^{m}, P = 0.41100 d |
| SSSPM J1549-3544 | | | | | | 15^{h} 48^{m} 40.23^{s} | −35° 44′ 25.5″ | 14.78 | | 350 | sdK5 | previously misclassified as a white dwarf |
| 4U 1543-47 | | | IL | | | 15^{h} 47^{m} 08.6^{s} | −40° 40′ 10″ | 14.9 | | | A2V | low-mass X-ray binary, V_{max} = 14.6^{m}, V_{min} = 16.7^{m}, P = 1.116407 d |
| Lupus-TR-3 | | | | | | 15^{h} 30^{m} 18.67^{s} | −42° 28′ 46.5″ | 17.4 | 5.2 | 8950 | K1V | has a planet (b) |
| IM Lup | | | IM | | 78053 | 15^{h} 56^{m} 09.18^{s} | −37° 56′ 06.1″ | | | | M0 | T Tau star |
| BR Lup | | | BR | | | 15^{h} 35^{m} 53.14^{s} | −40° 34′ 06.1″ | | | | | SU UMa variable |
| IRAS 15194-5115 | | | II | | | 15^{h} 23^{m} 05.08^{s} | −51° 25′ 58.7″ | | | | C | Mira variable |
Table legend: • Name = Proper name • B = Bayer designation • F or/and G. = Flamsteed designation or Gould designation • Var = Variable star designation • HD = Henry Draper Catalogue designation number • HIP = Hipparcos Catalogue designation number • RA = Right ascension for the Epoch/Equinox J2000.0 • Dec = Declination for the Epoch/Equinox J2000.0 • vis. mag. = visual magnitude (m or m_{v}), also known as apparent magnitude • abs. mag. = absolute magnitude (M_{v}) • Dist. (ly) = Distance in light-years from Earth • Sp. class = Spectral class of the star in the stellar classification system • Notes = Common name(s) or alternate name(s); comments; notable properties [for example: multiple star status, range of variability if it is a variable star, exoplanets, etc.]

== See also ==
- List of stars by constellation
