= Lupus in Chinese astronomy =

According to traditional Chinese uranography, the modern constellation Lupus is located within the eastern quadrant of the sky, which is symbolized as the Azure Dragon of the East (東方青龍, Dōng Fāng Qīng Lóng).

The name of the western constellation in modern Chinese is 豺狼座 (chái láng zuò), meaning "the dhole constellation".

== Stars ==
The map of Chinese constellation in constellation Lupus area consists of:

| Four Symbols | Mansion (Chinese name) | Romanization | Translation | Asterisms (Chinese name) | Romanization | Translation | Western star name | Proper Name | Chinese star name | Romanization | Translation |
|---|---|---|---|---|---|---|---|---|---|---|---|
| Azure Dragon of the East (東方青龍) | 角 | Jiǎo | Horn | 柱 | Zhǔ | Pillars | | | | | |
| Azure Dragon of the East (東方青龍) | 角 | Jiǎo | Horn | 柱 | Zhǔ | Pillars | ι Lup | | 柱三 | Zhǔsān | 3rd star |
| Azure Dragon of the East (東方青龍) | 角 | Jiǎo | Horn | 柱 | Zhǔ | Pillars | τ^{1} Lup and τ^{2} Lup | | 柱四 | Zhǔsì | 4th star |
| Azure Dragon of the East (東方青龍) | 亢 | Kàng | Neck | 頓頑 | Dùnwán | Trials | | | | | |
| Azure Dragon of the East (東方青龍) | 亢 | Kàng | Neck | 頓頑 | Dùnwán | Trials | φ^{1} Lup and φ^{2} Lup | | 頓頑一 | Dùnwányī | 1st star |
| Azure Dragon of the East (東方青龍) | 亢 | Kàng | Neck | 頓頑 | Dùnwán | Trials | 1 Lup | | 頓頑二 | Dùnwánèr | 2nd star |
| Azure Dragon of the East (東方青龍) | 氐 | Dī | Root | | | | | | | | |
| Azure Dragon of the East (東方青龍) | 氐 | Dī | Root | 陣車 | Zhènchē | Battle Chariots | 2 Lup | | 陣車三 | Zhènchēsān | 3rd star |
| Azure Dragon of the East (東方青龍) | 氐 | Dī | Root | 騎官 | Qíguān | Imperial Guards | | | | | |
| Azure Dragon of the East (東方青龍) | 氐 | Dī | Root | 騎官 | Qíguān | Imperial Guards | γ Lup | | 騎官一 | Qíguānyī | 1st star |
| Azure Dragon of the East (東方青龍) | 氐 | Dī | Root | 騎官 | Qíguān | Imperial Guards | δ Lup | | 騎官二 | Qíguānèr | 2nd star |
| Azure Dragon of the East (東方青龍) | 氐 | Dī | Root | 騎官 | Qíguān | Imperial Guards | β Lup | | 騎官四 | Qíguānsì | 4th star |
| Azure Dragon of the East (東方青龍) | 氐 | Dī | Root | 騎官 | Qíguān | Imperial Guards | λ Lup | | 騎官五 | Qíguānwu | 5th star |
| Azure Dragon of the East (東方青龍) | 氐 | Dī | Root | 騎官 | Qíguān | Imperial Guards | ε Lup | | 騎官六 | Qíguānliù | 6th star |
| Azure Dragon of the East (東方青龍) | 氐 | Dī | Root | 騎官 | Qíguān | Imperial Guards | μ Lup | | 騎官七 | Qíguānqī | 7th star |
| Azure Dragon of the East (東方青龍) | 氐 | Dī | Root | 騎官 | Qíguān | Imperial Guards | π Lup | | 騎官八 | Qíguānbā | 8th star |
| Azure Dragon of the East (東方青龍) | 氐 | Dī | Root | 騎官 | Qíguān | Imperial Guards | ο Lup | | 騎官九 | Qíguānjiǔ | 9th star |
| Azure Dragon of the East (東方青龍) | 氐 | Dī | Root | 騎官 | Qíguān | Imperial Guards | α Lup | Uridim | 騎官十 | Qíguānshí | 10th star |
| Azure Dragon of the East (東方青龍) | 氐 | Dī | Root | 車騎 | Chēqí | Chariots and Cavalry | | | | | |
| Azure Dragon of the East (東方青龍) | 氐 | Dī | Root | 車騎 | Chēqí | Chariots and Cavalry | ζ Lup | | 車騎一 | Chēqíyī | 1st star |
| Azure Dragon of the East (東方青龍) | 氐 | Dī | Root | 車騎 | Chēqí | Chariots and Cavalry | ρ Lup | | 車騎二 | Chēqíèr | 2nd star |
| Azure Dragon of the East (東方青龍) | 氐 | Dī | Root | 車騎 | Chēqí | Chariots and Cavalry | σ Lup | | 車騎四 | Chēqísān | 3rd star |
| Azure Dragon of the East (東方青龍) | 氐 | Dī | Root | 騎陣將軍 | Qízhènjiāngjūn | Chariots and Cavalry General | κ^{1} Lup | | 騎陣將軍 | Qízhènjiāngjūn | (One star of) |
| Azure Dragon of the East (東方青龍) | 房 | Fáng | Room | 從官 | Cóngguān | Retinue | | | | | |
| Azure Dragon of the East (東方青龍) | 房 | Fáng | Room | 從官 | Cóngguān | Retinue | ψ^{2} Lup | | 從官一 | Cóngguānyī | 1st star |
| Azure Dragon of the East (東方青龍) | 房 | Fáng | Room | 從官 | Cóngguān | Retinue | χ Lup | | 從官二 | Cóngguānèr | 2nd star |
| Azure Dragon of the East (東方青龍) | 房 | Fáng | Room | 從官 | Cóngguān | Retinue | ψ^{1} Lup | | 從官增一 | Cóngguānzēngyī | 1st additional star |
| Azure Dragon of the East (東方青龍) | 心 | Xīn | Heart | 積卒 | Jīzú | Group of Soldiers | | | | | |
| Azure Dragon of the East (東方青龍) | 心 | Xīn | Heart | 積卒 | Jīzú | Group of Soldiers | θ Lup | | 積卒一 | Jīzúyī | 1st star |
| Azure Dragon of the East (東方青龍) | 心 | Xīn | Heart | 積卒 | Jīzú | Group of Soldiers | η Lup | | 積卒二 | Jīzúèr | 2nd star |
| Azure Dragon of the East (東方青龍) | 心 | Xīn | Heart | 積卒 | Jīzú | Group of Soldiers | HD 144415 | | 積卒增二 | Jīzúzēngèr | 2nd additional star |

== See also ==
- Traditional Chinese star names
- Chinese constellations
