= Phi Lupi =

The Bayer designation φ Lupi (Phi Lupi) is shared by two star systems in the constellation Lupus:

- φ^{1} Lupi (HD 136422)
- φ^{2} Lupi (HD 136664)
