= Tau Lupi =

The Bayer designation τ Lupi (Tau Lupi) is shared by two star systems in the constellation Lupus:

- τ^{1} Lupi (HD 126341)
- τ^{2} Lupi (HD 126354)
