= Omega Lupi =

Star in the constellation Lupus

- Location of ω Lupi (circled in red)

Observation data Epoch J2000.0 Equinox J2000.0 (ICRS)
- Constellation: Lupus
- Right ascension: 15^{h} 38^{m} 03.20372^{s}
- Declination: −42° 34′ 02.4444″
- Apparent magnitude (V): 4.33 (4.33 + 11.0)

Characteristics
- Spectral type: K4.5 III
- U−B color index: +1.72
- B−V color index: +1.43

Astrometry
Radial velocity (R_{v})	−6.8±2.7 km/s
Proper motion (μ)	RA: −21.37 mas/yr Dec.: −29.98 mas/yr
Parallax (π)	8.97±0.27 mas
Distance	360 ± 10 ly (111 ± 3 pc)
Absolute magnitude (M_{V})	+0.21

Details

A
Radius	22 R_{☉}
Luminosity	122 L_{☉}
Temperature	4,087 K

B
Radius	0.8 R_{☉}
Luminosity	0.21 L_{☉}
Surface gravity (log g)	4.56 cgs
Temperature	4,480 K

Other designations
- ω Lup, CD−42°10601, FK5 3232, HD 139127, HIP 76552, HR 5797, SAO 226004

Database references
SIMBAD	data

Omega Lupi, Latinised from ω Lupi, is a double star in the southern constellation of Lupus. It is visible to the naked eye with an apparent visual magnitude of 4.33, showing up as a red-hued star just to the south of Gamma Lupi. Based upon an annual parallax shift of 8.97 mas as seen from Earth, it is located around 360 light-years from the Sun.

As of 2007, the components of this system had an angular separation of 11.4 arcseconds along a position angle of 29°, and are most likely gravitationally bound as a wide binary star system. The primary component is a magnitude 4.48 evolved giant star with a stellar classification of K4.5 III. The measured angular diameter, after correction for limb darkening, is 3.39±0.04 mas. At the estimated distance of Omega Lupi, this yields a physical size of about 40 times the radius of the Sun. The companion is a magnitude 11.0 star.
