= GG Lupi =

Binary star in the constellation Lupus

- Location of GG Lupi (circled in red)

Observation data Epoch J2000 Equinox ICRS
- Constellation: Lupus
- Right ascension: 15^{h} 18^{m} 56.3747^{s}
- Declination: −40° 47′ 17.597″
- Apparent magnitude (V): 5.58–6.11

Characteristics
- Spectral type: B7V (primary) B9V (secondary)
- U−B color index: −0.46
- B−V color index: −0.099
- Variable type: Algol

Astrometry
Radial velocity (R_{v})	+4.0±1.0 km/s
Proper motion (μ)	RA: −19.219 mas/yr Dec.: −21.791 mas/yr
Parallax (π)	6.6639±0.0894 mas
Distance	489 ± 7 ly (150 ± 2 pc)
Absolute magnitude (M_{V})	−0.53

Orbit
Period (P)	1.8495927 d
Semi-major axis (a)	12.01 AU
Eccentricity (e)	0.15
Inclination (i)	87.5°

Details

Primary
Mass	4.16±0.12 M_{☉}
Radius	2.42±0.05 R_{☉}
Surface gravity (log g)	4.28 cgs
Temperature	13,000 K
Rotational velocity (v sin i)	97±8 km/s

Secondary
Mass	2.64±0.12 M_{☉}
Radius	1.79±0.04 R_{☉}
Surface gravity (log g)	4.30 cgs
Temperature	10,600 K
Rotational velocity (v sin i)	61±5 km/s
Age	20 Myr

Other designations
- HD 135876, HIP 74950, HR 5687, SAO 225647, 2MASS J15185637-4047176

Database references
SIMBAD	data

GG Lupi is an eclipsing binary star in the southern constellation of Lupus. Most of the time it is a magnitude 5.6 object, making it faintly visible to the naked eye, but during the primary eclipse its brightness falls to 6.1. GG Lupi is located one half-degree (one full moon diameter) west of the third-magnitude star Delta Lupi.

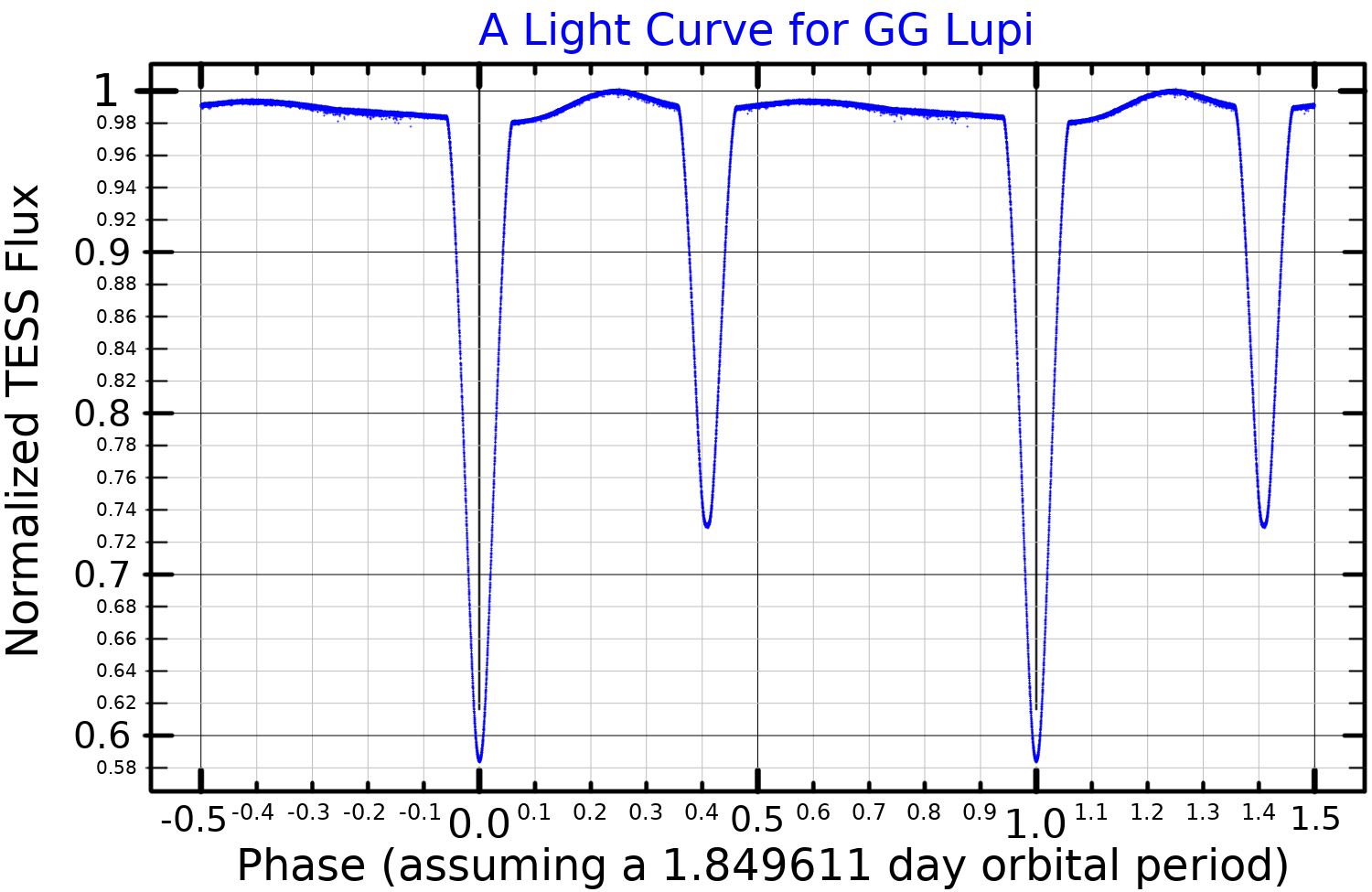
A light curve for GG Lupi, plotted from TESS data

This star was found to be a spectroscopic binary in 1930, and its eclipses were detected in observations during 1964. Its location in the sky, distance (~490 light-years) and proper motion make it a likely member of the Scorpius–Centaurus association within the Gould's Belt star-formation region. The two stars comprising this binary are both very young main-sequence stars of spectral type B. They are estimated to be about 20 million years old, placing them near the zero-age main sequence. Their orbit is somewhat eccentric (e=0.15) and the period of apsidal precession is 102 years.
