= I Lupi =

- i Lupi (the Wolves) - the nickname of the A.S. Roma, an Italian football team.
- 1 Lupi - one of the stars in the constellation Lupus.
