= HD 134687 =

Binary star system in the constellation of Lupus

- Location of HD 134687 (circled in red)

Observation data Epoch J2000 Equinox J2000
- Constellation: Lupus
- Right ascension: 15^{h} 12^{m} 49.58752^{s}
- Declination: −44° 30′ 01.4904″
- Apparent magnitude (V): 4.81

Characteristics
- Evolutionary stage: main sequence
- Spectral type: B3 IV/V
- B−V color index: −0.177±0.011

Astrometry
Radial velocity (R_{v})	+13.5±7.4 km/s
Proper motion (μ)	RA: −21.669 mas/yr Dec.: −21.895 mas/yr
Parallax (π)	7.2373±0.2045 mas
Distance	450 ± 10 ly (138 ± 4 pc)
Absolute magnitude (M_{V})	−1.11

Orbit
Period (P)	0.901407 d
Eccentricity (e)	≤ 0.03
Periastron epoch (T)	0.366

Details

e Lup A
Mass	6.0±0.1 M_{☉}
Radius	7.1 R_{☉}
Luminosity (bolometric)	997 L_{☉}
Temperature	17,100 K
Rotational velocity (v sin i)	13 km/s
Age	20.3±4.8 Myr

Other designations
- e Lup, CD−44°9932, HD 134687, HIP 74449, HR 5651, SAO 225539

Database references
SIMBAD	data

HD 134687 (e Lupi) is a binary star system in the southern constellation Lupus. It is visible to the naked eye with an apparent visual magnitude of 4.81. The distance to HD 134687 can be estimated from its annual parallax shift of 7.2 mas, yielding roughly 450 light years. It is a member of the ~11 million year old Upper Centaurus–Lupus subgroup of the Scorpius–Centaurus association, the closest OB association to the Sun.

This is a single-lined spectroscopic binary star system. The pair have a nearly circular orbit with an eccentricity of at or below 0.03 and a period of 0.901407 days (21.6338 h). The primary has an a sin i value of 2.735×10^{5} km, which only gives a lower bound for the semimajor axis a since the orbital inclination i to the line of sight is unknown. The system is a source for X-ray emission.

The visible component has a stellar classification of B3 IV/V, matching a B-type star showing a spectrum with mixed traits of a main sequence and a subgiant star. It is 20 million years old with a projected rotational velocity of 13 km/s. The star has 6.0 times the mass of the Sun and 7.1 times the Sun's radius. It is radiating 997 times the Sun's luminosity from its photosphere at an effective temperature of 17,100 K.
