= HR 5401 =

Star in the constellation Lupus

Observation data Epoch J2000 Equinox J2000
- Constellation: Lupus
- Right ascension: 14^{h} 27^{m} 12.15415^{s}
- Declination: −46° 08′ 03.0975″
- Apparent magnitude (V): 5.83

Characteristics
- Evolutionary stage: main sequence
- Spectral type: A1m A5/7-F2
- B−V color index: 0.311±0.004

Astrometry
Radial velocity (R_{v})	−30.0±3.8 km/s
Proper motion (μ)	RA: −150.420 mas/yr Dec.: −88.472 mas/yr
Parallax (π)	20.6065±0.4550 mas
Distance	158 ± 3 ly (49 ± 1 pc)
Absolute magnitude (M_{V})	+2.01

Details
Luminosity	13.01 L_{☉}
Surface gravity (log g)	3.92 cgs
Temperature	7,300 K
Metallicity [Fe/H]	0.2 dex

Other designations
- CD−45°9188, HD 126504, HIP 70663, HR 5401, SAO 224929, WDS J14272-4608A

Database references
SIMBAD	data

HR 5401 is a possible astrometric binary star system in the southern constellation of Lupus. With an apparent visual magnitude of 5.83, it is just visible to the naked eye under good seeing conditions. The distance to HR 5401 can be estimated from its annual parallax shift of 20.6 mas, yielding a range of 158 light years. It is moving closer to Earth with a heliocentric radial velocity of −30 km/s, and is expected to come within 161 ly in ~524,000 years.

This is an Am star with a stellar classification of A1m A5/7-F2. Lu (1991) lists it as a likely dwarf barium star. It is radiating 13 times the Sun's luminosity from its photosphere at an effective temperature of 7,300 K. This system is a source of X-ray emission which may be coming from the companion.

HR 5401 has two visual companions. Component B is a magnitude 11.50 star at an angular separation of 33.1″ along a position angle (PA) of 114°, as of 1999. The second companion, designated component C, is magnitude 11.16 with a separation of 27.20″ at a PA of 164°, as of 2000.
