= KT Lupi =

Visual binary star system in the constellation of Lupus

- Location of KT Lupi (circled in red)

Observation data Epoch J2000 Equinox ICRS
- Constellation: Lupus
- Right ascension: 15^{h} 35^{m} 53.24806^{s}
- Declination: −44° 57′ 30.1982″
- Apparent magnitude (V): 4.55 (4.66 + 6.62)

Characteristics
- Spectral type: B3 V + B6 V
- B−V color index: −0.175±0.003
- Variable type: Be

Astrometry
Radial velocity (R_{v})	+6.5±2.8 km/s
Proper motion (μ)	RA: −20.53 mas/yr Dec.: −21.23 mas/yr
Parallax (π)	7.62±0.43 mas
Distance	430 ± 20 ly (131 ± 7 pc)
Absolute magnitude (M_{V})	−1.03

Details

KT Lup A
Mass	5.9±0.1 M_{☉}
Radius	3.00±0.06 R_{☉}
Luminosity	794+791 −396 L_{☉}
Surface gravity (log g)	3.50±0.04 cgs
Temperature	18,400±184 K
Rotational velocity (v sin i)	30±0.6 km/s
Age	21.0±10.6 Myr

KT Lup B
Mass	2.79 M_{☉}

Other designations
- d Lup, KT Lup, CD−44°10239, HD 138769, HIP 76371, HR 5781, SAO 225950, WDS J15359-4457AB

Database references
SIMBAD	data

KT Lupi is a visual binary star system in the constellation Lupus. It is visible to the naked eye with a combined apparent visual magnitude of 4.55. As of 1983, the pair had an angular separation of 2.19″±0.03″. Based upon an annual parallax shift of 7.6 mas as seen from Earth's orbit, it is located 430 light-years from the Sun. The system is moving further from the Earth with a heliocentric radial velocity of +6.5 km/s. It is a member of the Upper Centaurus-Lupus sub-group of the Scorpius–Centaurus association.

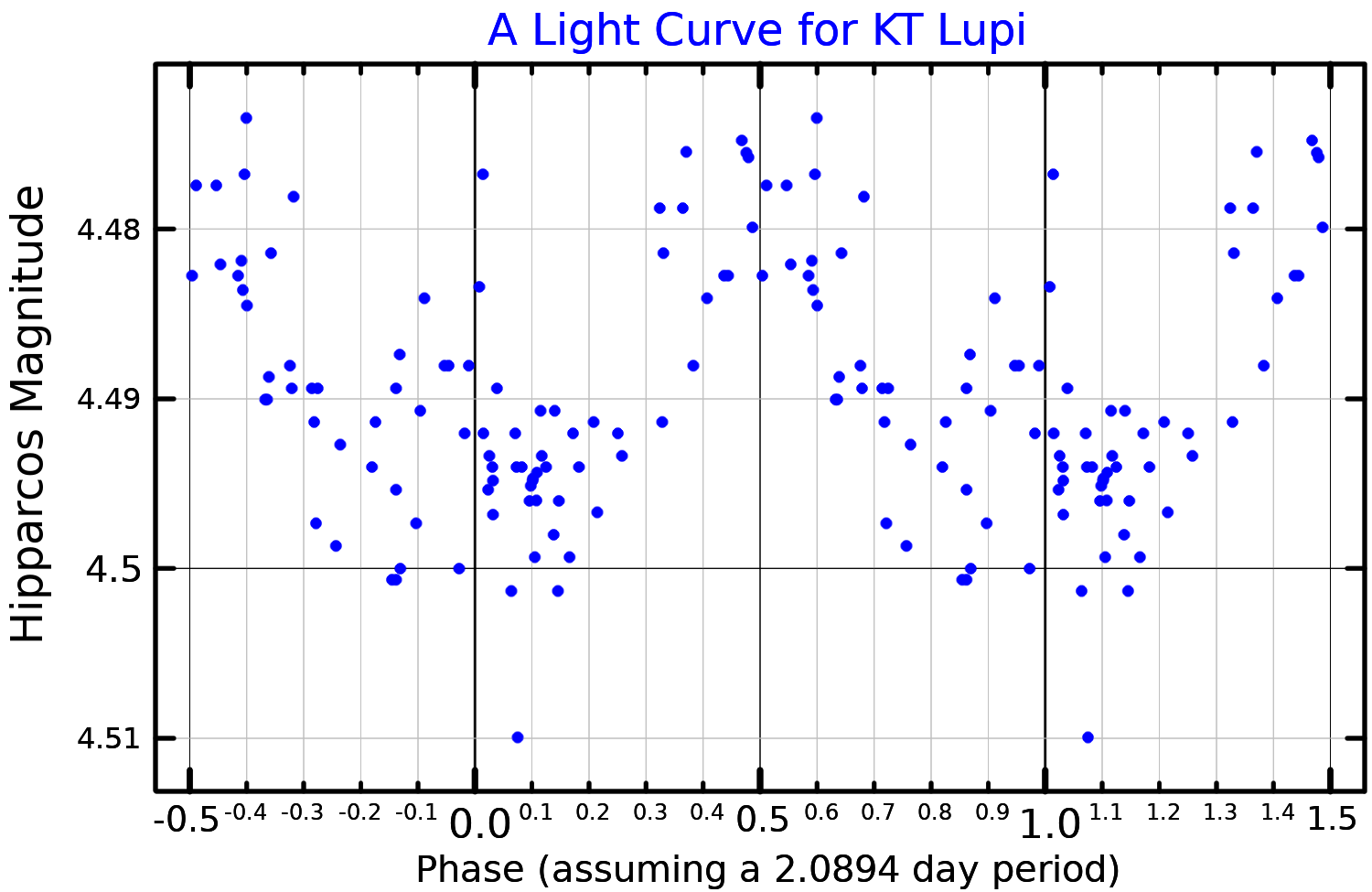
A light curve for KT Lupi, plotted from Hipparcos data

The primary, component A, is a variable Be star, with the variation being modulated by rotation. It is visual magnitude 4.66 with a stellar classification of B3 V, matching a B-type main-sequence star. Hiltner et al. (1969) gave a class of B3 IVp, which is still used in some studies. It is a helium-weak chemically peculiar star showing an enhanced silicon patch near the equator and a silicon-weak region close to the pole. The star is about 21 million years old with nearly six times the mass of the Sun and three times the Sun's radius. It is radiating roughly 794 times the Sun's luminosity from its photosphere at an effective temperature of 18,400 K.

The secondary companion, component B, is of magnitude 6.62 with a class of B6 V. It has 2.79 times the Sun's mass.
