= HD 143699 =

Star in the constellation of Lupus

- Location of HD 143699 (circled in red)

Observation data Epoch J2000 Equinox J2000
- Constellation: Lupus
- Right ascension: 16^{h} 03^{m} 24.18956^{s}
- Declination: −38° 36′ 09.1424″
- Apparent magnitude (V): 4.90

Characteristics
- Evolutionary stage: main sequence
- Spectral type: B5/7 III/IV
- B−V color index: −0.146±0.043

Astrometry
Radial velocity (R_{v})	−1.9±2.8 km/s
Proper motion (μ)	RA: −18.488 mas/yr Dec.: −28.147 mas/yr
Parallax (π)	9.2268±0.4693 mas
Distance	350 ± 20 ly (108 ± 6 pc)
Absolute magnitude (M_{V})	−0.54

Details
Mass	4.58 M_{☉}
Radius	3.89 R_{☉}
Luminosity	447 L_{☉}
Surface gravity (log g)	3.82 cgs
Temperature	15,480 K
Rotation	0.894 days
Rotational velocity (v sin i)	115 km/s
Age	60 Myr

Other designations
- CD−38°10832, FK5 3267, HD 143699, HIP 78655, HR 5967, SAO 207276

Database references
SIMBAD	data

HD 143699 is a single star in the southern constellation of Lupus. It is a dim star but visible to the naked eye with an apparent visual magnitude of 4.90. Based upon an annual parallax shift of 9.2 mas, it is located around 350 light years away. It is most likely (90% chance) a member of the Upper Centaurus–Lupus subgroup of the Sco OB2 moving group.

This star has a stellar classification of B5/7 III/IV, suggesting it is an evolving star that is entering the giant stage. However, according to Zorec and Royer (2012) it is only 56% of the way through its main sequence lifespan. It is a chemically peculiar magnetic B star, showing an averaged quadratic field strength of (167.2±140.4)×10^{−3} T. Helium-weak, it displays an underabundance of helium in its spectrum. Radio emissions have been detected from this source.

HD 143699 has 4.6 times the mass of the Sun and 3.9 times the Sun's radius. It has a high rate of spin with a projected rotational velocity of 115 km/s, resulting in a short rotation period of 0.894 days. The star is radiating 447 times the Sun's luminosity from its photosphere at an effective temperature of 15,480 K.
