= Epsilon Lupi =

Multiple star system

ε Lupi
- Location of ε Lupi (circled)

Observation data Epoch J2000.0 Equinox ICRS
- Constellation: Lupus
- Right ascension: 15^{h} 22^{m} 40.86826^{s}
- Declination: −44° 41′ 22.6146″
- Apparent magnitude (V): 3.41

Characteristics
- Spectral type: B2 IV-V
- U−B color index: −0.778
- B−V color index: −0.195

Astrometry
Radial velocity (R_{v})	+7.9 km/s
Proper motion (μ)	RA: −22.86 mas/yr Dec.: −18.87 mas/yr
Parallax (π)	6.37±0.70 mas
Distance	approx. 510 ly (approx. 160 pc)
Absolute magnitude (M_{V})	−2.55

Orbit
Primary	Aa
Name	Ab
Period (P)	4.559646 days
Semi-major axis (a)	31.5+2.5 −2.3 R_{☉}
Eccentricity (e)	0.2806+0.0059 −0.0047
Inclination (i)	18.8+1.6 −1.4°
Periastron epoch (T)	2,452,790.33
Argument of periastron (ω) (primary)	335.7+4.8 −4.5°
Semi-amplitude (K_{1}) (primary)	53.8 km/s
Semi-amplitude (K_{2}) (secondary)	64.7 km/s

Details

ε Lup Aa
Mass	11.0+2.9 −2.2 M_{☉}
Radius	4.64+0.37 −0.48 R_{☉}
Luminosity (bolometric)	3,407+658 −567 L_{☉}
Surface gravity (log g)	3.89 ± 0.17 cgs
Temperature	20,500 K
Rotational velocity (v sin i)	133 km/s

ε Lup Ab
Mass	9.2+2.4 −1.9 M_{☉}
Radius	4.83+0.42 −0.46 R_{☉}
Luminosity	2,197+489 −399 L_{☉}
Temperature	18,000 K

Other designations
- ε Lup, CPD−44°7342, HD 136504, HIP 75264, HR 5708, SAO 225712

Database references
SIMBAD	data

Epsilon Lupi, Latinized from ε Lup, is a multiple star system in the southern constellation of Lupus. At an apparent visual magnitude of 3.41, Epsilon Lupi can be readily viewed from the southern hemisphere with sufficiently dark skies. It is the fifth-brightest star or star system in the constellation. Parallax measurements give a distance to this system of roughly 510 light-years (160 parsecs).

This system is what astronomers term a double-lined spectroscopic binary. When the spectrum is examined, the absorption line features of both stars can be viewed. As a result of the Doppler effect, these lines shift back and forth in frequency as the two stars orbit around each other. This allows some of their orbital elements to be deduced, even though the individual stars have not been resolved with a telescope. The pair share a close, elliptical orbit with a period of 4.55970 days. The orbital eccentricity is 0.277, which means that at the separation at closest approach, or periapsis, is only 57% of the distance at their greatest separation, or apoapsis. There is a third, more distant companion at an angular separation of around 1 arcsecond that may be orbiting the pair with a period of about 64 years.

The pair that share the close orbit, Epsilon Lupi Aa and Epsilon Lupi Ab, have estimated masses of 13.24 and 11.46 times the mass of the Sun, respectively. The more distant component, Epsilon Lupi B, has a mass of about 7.64 times the Sun. The combined stellar classification of the system is B2 IV-V, while the individual components may have spectral classes of B3 IV, B3 V, and A5 V, in order of decreasing mass. The inner A-a pair appear to have their rate of spin synchronized with their orbit, so that the same face of each star always faces its partner. The secondary, Epsilon Lupi a, shows regular variation in luminosity of the type that occurs with Beta Cephei variables, at a periodicity of 10.36 cycles per day.

This star system is a probable member of the Scorpius–Centaurus association, a moving group of stars that originated together and share a similar trajectory through space.
