= Theta Centaurids =

Meteor shower

Theta Centaurids is a weak meteor shower that occurs from January 23 to March 12. It is only visible from the Southern Hemisphere.

== Basic information ==
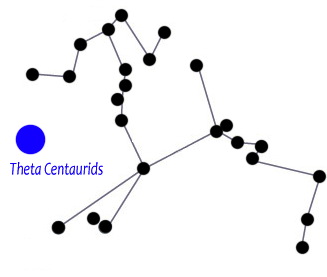
Approximate Location of Meteor Shower

- Abbreviation: TCE
- Speed: 60 km/s
- Rating: Weak
- Hourly rate: 4
- Peak Date: February 14
- Radiant: Alpha= 210 degrees, Delta= -40 degrees

== More information ==
Theta Centaurids is the northernmost of several meteor showers. The radiant is located west of Lupus. Theta Centaurids is best seen at five o’clock in the morning and eleven o’clock at night. This shower occurs as little as one day after Alpha Centaurids, a meteor shower around the same area. Another meteor shower nearby is the Omicron Centaurids shower. Theta Centaurids is considered a very fast meteor shower. Its range is -9, +40. It has 14:00 for a right ascension, and a declination of -41 (Right ascension and declination are like latitude and longitude for astronomy). This meteor shower badly needs a thorough scientific study.
