= HD 143009 =

Star in the constellation of Lupus

Observation data Epoch J2000 Equinox ICRS
- Constellation: Lupus
- Right ascension: 15^{h} 59^{m} 30.26689^{s}
- Declination: −41° 44′ 39.9869″
- Apparent magnitude (V): 4.99

Characteristics
- Spectral type: K0 II-III
- B−V color index: 0.988±0.002

Astrometry
Radial velocity (R_{v})	−27.0±2.8 km/s
Proper motion (μ)	RA: −37.658 mas/yr Dec.: −16.707 mas/yr
Parallax (π)	8.5885±0.3110 mas
Distance	380 ± 10 ly (116 ± 4 pc)
Absolute magnitude (M_{V})	−0.64

Details
Radius	16.83+0.16 −0.27 R_{☉}
Luminosity	152.3+6.2 −6.3 L_{☉}
Surface gravity (log g)	2.26 cgs
Temperature	4,942+40 −23 K
Metallicity [Fe/H]	0.07 dex

Other designations
- e Lup, CD−41° 10478, FK5 1418, HD 143009, HIP 78323, HR 5943, SAO 226425

Database references
SIMBAD	data

HD 143009 is a single star in the southern constellation of Lupus. It has an orange hue and is visible to the naked eye with an apparent visual magnitude of 4.99. The star lies at a distance of approximately 380 light years from the Sun based on parallax, but is drifting closer with a radial velocity of −27 km/s. It has an absolute magnitude of −0.64.

This is an evolved K-type star with a stellar classification of K0 II-III, displaying a luminosity class with mixed traits of a bright giant (II) and a giant star (III). With the supply of hydrogen at its core exhausted, the star has expanded to 16.8 times the radius of the Sun. It is radiating 152 times the Sun's luminosity from its enlarged photosphere at an effective temperature of 4,942 K.
