= Upsilon Lupi =

Star in the constellation Lupus

- The location of Upsilon Lupi (υ) in the constellation of Lupus (shown as a red target's bullseye).

Observation data Epoch J2000.0 Equinox J2000.0 (ICRS)
- Constellation: Lupus
- Right ascension: 15^{h} 24^{m} 45.00855^{s}
- Declination: −39° 42′ 36.9524″
- Apparent magnitude (V): 5.37 (5.37 + 10.90)

Characteristics
- Spectral type: A0p Si
- B−V color index: −0.11

Astrometry
Radial velocity (R_{v})	−7.6±2.8 km/s
Proper motion (μ)	RA: −26.10 mas/yr Dec.: −54.77 mas/yr
Parallax (π)	8.02±0.62 mas
Distance	410 ± 30 ly (125 ± 10 pc)
Absolute magnitude (M_{V})	−0.10

Details

υ Lup A
Luminosity	113 L_{☉}
Temperature	10,049 K
Rotational velocity (v sin i)	0 km/s

Other designations
- υ Lup, CD−39°9827, HD 136933, HIP 75439, HR 5719, SAO 206597

Database references
SIMBAD	data

Upsilon Lupi, Latinized from υ Lupi, is a star system in the southern constellation of Lupus. It is faintly visible to the naked eye with an apparent visual magnitude of 5.37. Based upon an annual parallax shift of 8.02 mas as seen from Earth, it is located around 410 light years from the Sun. The two components of Upsilon Lupi share a common proper motion through space and most likely form a wide binary star system. As of 1945, the pair had an angular separation of 1.50 arc seconds along a position angle of 40°.

The brighter member, component A, is a chemically peculiar Ap star with a stellar classification of A0p Si, where the 'Si' suffix indicates an abnormal abundance of silicon in the star's photosphere. A magnetic field has been detected with a quadratic field strength of (764.7±311.3)×10^{−4} T. The star is radiating 113 times the solar luminosity from its outer atmosphere at an effective temperature of 10,049 K.

The magnitude 10.9 companion star, component B, has a visual magnitude of 10.90. It may be the source of the X-ray emission detected coming from these coordinates.
