= Xi Lupi =

Triple star system in the constellation Lupus

- Location of ξ Lupi (circled in red)

Observation data Epoch J2000.0 Equinox ICRS
- Constellation: Lupus
- ξ^{1} Lup
- Right ascension: 15^{h} 56^{m} 53.48964^{s}
- Declination: −33° 57′ 58.0131″
- Apparent magnitude (V): 5.114
- ξ^{2} Lup
- Right ascension: 15^{h} 56^{m} 54.11281^{s}
- Declination: −33° 57′ 51.3380″
- Apparent magnitude (V): 5.55

Characteristics

ξ^{1} Lup
- Spectral type: A3 V
- U−B color index: 0.069
- B−V color index: 0.116

ξ^{2} Lup
- Spectral type: B9 V
- B−V color index: +0.06

Astrometry

ξ^{1} Lup
Radial velocity (R_{v})	−10.0±4.2 km/s
Proper motion (μ)	RA: +11.963 mas/yr Dec.: −37.94 mas/yr
Parallax (π)	15.0230±0.1787 mas
Distance	217 ± 3 ly (66.6 ± 0.8 pc)

ξ^{2} Lup
Radial velocity (R_{v})	−12.20±1.78 km/s
Proper motion (μ)	RA: +10.663 mas/yr Dec.: −41.073 mas/yr
Parallax (π)	15.5015±0.0722 mas
Distance	210.4 ± 1.0 ly (64.5 ± 0.3 pc)

Details

ξ^{1} Lup A
Mass	2.0 M_{☉}
Radius	2.0 R_{☉}
Surface gravity (log g)	4.14±0.14 cgs
Temperature	8,650 K
Rotational velocity (v sin i)	78 km/s
Age	450 Myr

ξ^{1} Lup B
Mass	1.65 M_{☉}
Radius	1.6 R_{☉}
Temperature	7,800 K
Age	450 Myr

ξ^{2} Lup
Mass	2 M_{☉}
Radius	1.74±0.04 R_{☉}
Luminosity	22.7±1.0 L_{☉}
Surface gravity (log g)	4.34±0.06 cgs
Temperature	9,550±120 K
Rotational velocity (v sin i)	184 km/s
Age	500 Myr

Other designations
- CCDM J15569-3358, WDS J15569-3358
- A: ξ^{1} Lup, CD−33°10826A, HD 142629, HIP 78105, HR 5925, SAO 207144
- B: ξ^{2} Lup, CD−33°10826B, HD 142630, HIP 78106, HR 5926, SAO 207145

Database references
SIMBAD	ξ^{1} Lup
- ξ^{2} Lup

Xi Lupi is a triple star system in the southern constellation of Lupus. Its main identifier is a Bayer designation that is Latinized from ξ Lupi, and abbreviated Xi Lup or ξ Lup. The combined apparent magnitude is 4.56, making it faintly visible to the naked eye. (Note: Calculated from components' individual magnitudes using the equation given in Apparent magnitude § Magnitude addition.) The system is located at 210 light-years (64 parsecs) from Earth, and is a member of the Upper Scorpius sub-group of the nearby Sco OB2 association.

== Characteristics ==
This is a hierarchical triple system. It consists on the binary star ξ^{1} Lup and the star ξ^{2} Lup; both form a visual binary separated by 10.2" in the sky, or 660 astronomical units at their distance. The components of ξ^{1} Lup, named ξ^{1} Lup A and B, are separated by about the same distance Earth is from Sun (1 au), the orbital period is an estimated 200 days, although the observed separation is merely a projected separation and the whole orbit has not been observed.

ξ^{1} Lup has a combined stellar classification of A3 V, and its primary and secondary components have, respectively, 2.0 and 1.65 times the mass of the Sun, radii 2.0 and 1.6 times solar and effective temperatures of 8,650 and 7,850 K.

ξ^{2} Lup has a stellar classification of B9 V, matching a B-type main-sequence star. It has twice the mass of the Sun, 1.74 times the Sun's radius, is 23 times more luminous and has an effective temperature of 9,550 K. It spins rapidly with a projected rotational velocity of 184 km/s. The star has a peculiar velocity of 14.3±1.9 km/s relative to its neighbors, and is probably (86% chance) a runaway star.

The system is currently about 500 million years old. When ξ^{1} Lup A evolves into an AGB star, it will likely engulf component Ab, but given the orbit of the system is unknown, it may be more distant, and survive its companion's AGB phase. Assuming the Aa-Ab separation is correct, the system will likely end as a triple white dwarf system; few of such system have been observed so far.
