= HD 137058 =

Star in the southern constellation of Lupus

- Location of HD 137058 (circled in red)

Observation data Epoch J2000 Equinox ICRS
- Constellation: Lupus
- Right ascension: 15^{h} 25^{m} 20.20923^{s}
- Declination: −38° 44′ 00.8803″
- Apparent magnitude (V): 4.60

Characteristics
- Evolutionary stage: main sequence
- Spectral type: A0 V
- B−V color index: 0.000±0.015

Astrometry
Radial velocity (R_{v})	−3.0±2.8 km/s
Proper motion (μ)	RA: −41.573 mas/yr Dec.: −24.603 mas/yr
Parallax (π)	13.6178±0.4759 mas
Distance	240 ± 8 ly (73 ± 3 pc)
Absolute magnitude (M_{V})	−0.76

Details
Mass	2.4 M_{☉}
Radius	3.3 R_{☉}
Luminosity	72 L_{☉}
Surface gravity (log g)	3.78 cgs
Temperature	9,283 K
Rotational velocity (v sin i)	300.0 km/s
Age	267 Myr

Other designations
- k Lup, CD−38°10289, HD 137058, HIP 75501, HR 5724, SAO 206616

Database references
SIMBAD	data

HD 137058 is a star in the southern constellation of Lupus. Eggleton and Tokovinin (2008) list it as a single star, although Nitschelm and David (2011) suggested it may be a double-lined spectroscopic binary. Its apparent visual magnitude is 4.60, making it bright enough to be visible to the naked eye. Based on an annual parallax shift of 13.6 mas, it is located approximately 240 light years away.

The primary component has a stellar classification of A0 V, indicating it is an A-type main-sequence star. It rotates rapidly, with a projected rotational velocity of 300 km/s, resulting in an oblate shape with an equatorial radius 22% larger than its polar radius. The star radiates 72 times the Sun's luminosity from its photosphere at an effective temperature of 9,283 K.
