= HD 125442 =

Star in the constellation Lupus

- Location of HD 125442 (circled in red)

Observation data Epoch J2000 Equinox ICRS
- Constellation: Lupus
- Right ascension: 14^{h} 20^{m} 42.58071^{s}
- Declination: −45° 11′ 13.4190″
- Apparent magnitude (V): 4.78

Characteristics
- Spectral type: F0 IV
- B−V color index: 0.310±0.003

Astrometry
Radial velocity (R_{v})	+0.0±3.7 km/s
Proper motion (μ)	RA: +37.33 mas/yr Dec.: −72.81 mas/yr
Parallax (π)	22.1448±0.3265 mas
Distance	147 ± 2 ly (45.2 ± 0.7 pc)
Absolute magnitude (M_{V})	1.49

Details
Mass	1.58 M_{☉}
Radius	2.95 R_{☉}
Luminosity	20.2 L_{☉}
Surface gravity (log g)	3.97 cgs
Temperature	7,123 K
Rotational velocity (v sin i)	148±10 km/s
Age	614 Myr

Other designations
- CD−44°9236, HD 125442, HIP 70104, HR 5364, SAO 224843

Database references
SIMBAD	data

HD 125442 is a single star in the southern constellation of Lupus. Its apparent visual magnitude is 4.78, which can be seen with the naked eye. The distance to HD 125442, as determined from its annual parallax shift of 22.1 mas, is 147 light years.

This is an F-type subgiant star with a stellar classification of F0 IV, having, at the age of 614 million years, used up the hydrogen at its core and begun the process of evolving into a giant star. It has 1.6 times the mass of the Sun and is radiating 20 times the Sun's luminosity from its photosphere at an effective temperature of 7,123 K. The star displays a high rate of spin with a projected rotational velocity of 148 km/s.
