= HD 125383 =

Binary star in the constellation Lupus

Observation data Epoch J2000 Equinox ICRS
- Constellation: Lupus
- A
- Right ascension: 14^{h} 20^{m} 09.7016^{s}
- Declination: −43° 03′ 31.834″
- Apparent magnitude (V): 5.77
- B
- Right ascension: 14^{h} 20^{m} 09.4278^{s}
- Declination: −43° 03′ 30.025″
- Apparent magnitude (V): 7.94

Characteristics
- Evolutionary stage: giant + subgiant
- Spectral type: G8 III + G0 IV
- B−V color index: 0.907±0.001

Astrometry

A
Radial velocity (R_{v})	−19.0±0.4 km/s
Proper motion (μ)	RA: −9.840 mas/yr Dec.: +7.828 mas/yr
Parallax (π)	7.9485±0.0563 mas
Distance	410 ± 3 ly (125.8 ± 0.9 pc)
Absolute magnitude (M_{V})	+0.3

B
Proper motion (μ)	RA: −7.301 mas/yr Dec.: +5.219 mas/yr
Parallax (π)	8.0287±0.0361 mas
Distance	406 ± 2 ly (124.6 ± 0.6 pc)

Details

A
Radius	11.77+0.06 −0.05 R_{☉}
Luminosity	84 L_{☉}
Surface gravity (log g)	3.00±0.00 cgs
Temperature	5,784+30 −46 K

B
Radius	2.02±0.08 R_{☉}
Surface gravity (log g)	3.84+0.68 −0.52 cgs
Temperature	5,947+71 −73 K

Other designations
- CD−42°9235, HD 125383, HIP 70054, HR 5362, WDS J14202-4304

Database references
SIMBAD	HD 125383 A
- HD 125383 B

HD 125383 is a binary star in the constellation Lupus. At a combined apparent magnitude of +5.55, it is faintly visible to the naked eye in locations far from light pollution. Parallax measurements give distances of 410 light-years (125.8 parsecs) and 406 light-years (124.6 parsecs) for the primary and secondary, respectively.

== Characteristics ==
The two components are separated by 3.5" along a position angle of 301°, as of 2016. They have apparent magnitudes of 5.77 and 7.94.

The primary (A) has a spectral class of G8 III, with the luminosity class 'III' suggesting it is a giant that has exhausted the hydrogen at its core. The star has expanded to 11.8 times the Sun's radius and now radiates 84 times the Sun's luminosity from its photosphere at an effective temperature of 5,784 K. This temperature gives it a yellow hue typical of a G-type star.

The secondary (B) has a spectral class of G0 IV, with the luminosity class 'IV' suggesting it is a subgiant that has exhausted the hydrogen at its core. The star has expanded to 2.0 times the Sun's radius and has an effective temperature of 5,947 K. This temperature gives it a yellow hue typical of a G-type star.
