= Iota Lupi =

Star in the constellation Lupus

ι Lupi
- Location of ι Lupi (circled in red)

Observation data Epoch J2000.0 Equinox J2000.0 (ICRS)
- Constellation: Lupus
- Right ascension: 14^{h} 19^{m} 24.22219^{s}
- Declination: −46° 03′ 29.1437″
- Apparent magnitude (V): 3.54

Characteristics
- Spectral type: B2.5 IV
- U−B color index: −0.742
- B−V color index: −0.180

Astrometry
Radial velocity (R_{v})	21.6±4.1 km/s
Proper motion (μ)	RA: −12.56 mas/yr Dec.: −4.76 mas/yr
Parallax (π)	9.65±0.20 mas
Distance	338 ± 7 ly (104 ± 2 pc)
Absolute magnitude (M_{V})	−1.48

Details
Mass	6.9±0.1 M_{☉}
Radius	4.05±0.33 R_{☉}
Luminosity (bolometric)	2,082 L_{☉}
Surface gravity (log g)	3.94±0.07 cgs
Temperature	18,605±221 K
Metallicity [Fe/H]	+0.19±0.15 dex
Rotational velocity (v sin i)	370 km/s
Age	20.3±4.8 Myr

Other designations
- ι Lup, CD−45°9084, HD 125238, HIP 69996, HR 5354, SAO 224833

Database references
SIMBAD	data

ι Lupi, Latinised as Iota Lupi, is a solitary star in the southern constellation of Lupus. It is visible to the naked eye with an apparent visual magnitude of 3.54. Based upon an annual parallax shift of 9.65 mas as seen from Earth, it is located around 338 light years from the Sun. At that distance, the visual magnitude of the star is diminished by an extinction factor of 0.23 due to interstellar dust. Relative to its neighbors, this star has a peculiar velocity of 27.4±4.9 km/s. It appears to be a member of the Scorpio-Centaurus OB association.

This star has the spectrum of a B-type subgiant star with a stellar classification of B2.5 IV, which may indicate that it has used up its core supply of hydrogen and has begun to expand off the main-sequence. It is rotating rapidly with a projected rotational velocity of 370 km/s. This is giving the star an oblate shape with an equatorial bulge that is an estimated 12% larger than the polar radius. It is about 20 million years old with 6.9 times the mass of the Sun and 4 times the Sun's radius. The star radiates 2,082 times the solar luminosity from its outer atmosphere at an effective temperature of 18,605 K.
