= Zeta Lupi =

Brighter component of a wide double star system in the constellation Lupus

ζ Lupi
- Location of ζ Lupi (circled in red)

Observation data Epoch J2000.0 Equinox J2000.0 (ICRS)
- Constellation: Lupus
- Right ascension: 15^{h} 12^{m} 17.09595^{s}
- Declination: −52° 05′ 57.2919″
- Apparent magnitude (V): 3.41 (3.50 + 6.74)

Characteristics
- Spectral type: G7 III
- U−B color index: +0.66
- B−V color index: +0.92

Astrometry
Radial velocity (R_{v})	−10.0±0.6 km/s
Proper motion (μ)	RA: −112.92 mas/yr Dec.: −71.18 mas/yr
Parallax (π)	27.80±0.15 mas
Distance	117.3 ± 0.6 ly (36.0 ± 0.2 pc)
Absolute magnitude (M_{V})	0.65

Details

ζ Lup A
Mass	2.56±0.10 M_{☉}
Radius	9.00±0.18 R_{☉}
Luminosity	49.9±1.7 L_{☉}
Surface gravity (log g)	2.930±0.094 cgs
Temperature	5,114±36 K
Metallicity [Fe/H]	0.022±0.024 dex

Other designations
- ζ Lup, CD−51°8830, FK5 558, GJ 9512 A, HD 134505, HIP 74395, HR 5649, SAO 242304, WDS J15123-5206A

Database references
SIMBAD	data

ζ Lupi (Latinised as Zeta Lupi) is the brighter component of a wide double star in the constellation Lupus, consisting of an orange-hued primary and a fainter secondary with a golden-yellow hue. It is visible to the naked eye with a combined apparent visual magnitude of 3.41. Based upon an annual parallax shift of 27.80 mas as seen from Earth, it is located 117.3 light-years from the Sun.

This is a probable binary star system. As of 2013, the pair had an angular separation of 71.20 arcseconds along a position angle of 249°. The primary, component A, is an evolved G-type giant star with a visual magnitude of 3.50 and a stellar classification of G7 III. This is a red clump star, indicating that it is generating energy through the thermonuclear fusion of helium in its core region. It is 2.6 times more massive than the Sun and nine times larger. Zeta Lupi is 50 times more luminous than the Sun, emitting this energy from its photosphere at an effective temperature of 5114 K.

The secondary, component B, has a visual magnitude of 6.74.
