= Theta Lupi =

Star in the constellation Lupus

- Location of θ Lupi (circled in red)

Observation data Epoch J2000.0 Equinox J2000.0 (ICRS)
- Constellation: Lupus
- Right ascension: 16^{h} 06^{m} 35.54525^{s}
- Declination: −36° 48′ 08.2653″
- Apparent magnitude (V): 4.22

Characteristics
- Spectral type: B2.5 Vn
- U−B color index: −0.734
- B−V color index: −0.184

Astrometry
Radial velocity (R_{v})	+6.0±3.4 km/s
Proper motion (μ)	RA: −15.33 mas/yr Dec.: −33.83 mas/yr
Parallax (π)	7.87±0.47 mas
Distance	410 ± 20 ly (127 ± 8 pc)
Absolute magnitude (M_{V})	−1.29

Details
Mass	6.5±0.1 M_{☉}
Radius	4.5 R_{☉}
Luminosity	792 L_{☉}
Surface gravity (log g)	4.5 cgs
Temperature	15,395 K
Rotational velocity (v sin i)	331 km/s
Age	24.6±5.2 Myr

Other designations
- θ Lup, CD−36°10642, FK5 599, HD 144294, HIP 78918, HR 5987, SAO 207332

Database references
SIMBAD	data

Theta Lupi, Latinized from θ Lupi, is a solitary star in the southern constellation of Lupus. It is visible to the naked eye with an apparent visual magnitude of 4.22. (The planetary nebula NGC 6072 lies 1.4° to the east-northeast.) Based upon an annual parallax shift of 7.87 mas as seen from Earth, it is located roughly 410 light years away from the Sun. Relative to its neighbors, this star has a peculiar velocity of 16.7±3.7 km/s. It is a member of the nearby Sco OB2 association.

This is a B-type main sequence star with a stellar classification of B2.5 Vn, where the 'n' suffix indicates nebulous lines due to spin. It is rotating rapidly with a projected rotational velocity of 331 km/s. This is giving the star an oblate shape with an equatorial bulge that is an estimated 15% larger than the polar radius. The star has an estimated 6.5 times the mass of the Sun and around 4.5 times the Sun's radius. With an age of just 24.6 million years, it is radiating 792 times the solar luminosity from its outer atmosphere at an effective temperature of 15,395 K.
