= Kappa Lupi =

Binary star in the constellation Lupus

- Location of κ Lupi (circled in red)

Observation data Epoch J2000.0 Equinox ICRS
Constellation	Lupus
- κ^{1} Lup
Right ascension	15^{h} 11^{m} 56.07286^{s}
Declination	−48° 44′ 16.1692″
- Apparent magnitude (V): 3.86
- κ^{2} Lup
Right ascension	15^{h} 11^{m} 57.67537^{s}
Declination	−48° 44′ 37.2684″
- Apparent magnitude (V): 5.70

Characteristics

κ^{1} Lup
- Spectral type: B9.5 Vne
- U−B color index: −0.08
- B−V color index: −0.05

κ^{2} Lup
- Evolutionary stage: main sequence
- Spectral type: A3/5V
- B−V color index: +0.144±0.008

Astrometry

κ^{1} Lup
Radial velocity (R_{v})	−6.6±2.9 km/s
Proper motion (μ)	RA: −96.50 mas/yr Dec.: −49.86 mas/yr
Parallax (π)	18.12±0.47 mas
Distance	180 ± 5 ly (55 ± 1 pc)

κ^{2} Lup
Radial velocity (R_{v})	+0.0±3.7 km/s
Proper motion (μ)	RA: −98.497 mas/yr Dec.: −43.645 mas/yr
Parallax (π)	17.906±0.0587 mas
Distance	182.1 ± 0.6 ly (55.8 ± 0.2 pc)
Absolute magnitude (M_{V})	+1.84

Details

κ^{1} Lup
Mass	2.89±0.03 M_{☉}
Radius	3.0 R_{☉}
Luminosity	90 L_{☉}
Surface gravity (log g)	3.99±0.14 cgs
Temperature	10,280 K
Rotational velocity (v sin i)	191±16 km/s
Age	121 Myr

κ^{2} Lup
Mass	2.0 M_{☉}
Radius	1.8 R_{☉}
Luminosity	13 L_{☉}
Surface gravity (log g)	4.26 cgs
Temperature	8,255 K
Metallicity [Fe/H]	−0.01 dex
Rotational velocity (v sin i)	160.4±1.0 km/s
Age	653 Myr

Other designations
- κ^{1} Lup: CD−48°9704, FK5 1398, HD 134481, HIP 74376, HR 5646, SAO 225525
- κ^{2} Lup: CD−48°9705, HD 134482, HIP 74380, HR 5647, SAO 225526

Database references
SIMBAD	κ^{1} Lup
SIMBAD	κ^{2} Lup

Kappa Lupi is a binary star in the constellation of Lupus. With a combined apparent magnitude of 3.70, it is visible to the naked eye. The average distance to this system, based on parallax measurements, is 180 light-years.

The stars in the system are separated by an angular separation of 26.44″. At their distance, this corresponds to a projected separation of 1,450 astronomical units. They are members of the Hyades Stream, which is a moving group that is coincident with the proper motions of the Hyades cluster.

The primary, Kappa^{1} Lupi, has an apparent magnitude of 3.86. It is a B-type main sequence star with a stellar classification of B9.5 Vne. The 'n' suffix indicates the spectrum shows "nebulous" absorption lines due to rapid rotation, while the 'e' means this is a Be star that displays Balmer series emission lines. With an estimated age of 195 million years, it is about 75% of the way through its life span on the main sequence. The star is rotating with a projected rotational velocity of 191 km/s. This rate of spin is giving the star an oblate shape with an equatorial bulge that is an estimated 9% larger than the polar radius.

The secondary, Kappa^{2} Lupi, has an apparent magnitude of 5.70. It is an A-type main-sequence star with a stellar classification of A3/5V. The star has a high rotation rate, showing a projected rotational velocity of 160 km/s. It is 2.0 times more massive and 1.8 times larger than the Sun, with 13 times the Sun's luminosity and an effective temperature of 8,255 K.

In Chinese astronomy, Kappa^{1} Lupi is called 騎陣將軍, Pinyin: Qízhènjiāngjūn, meaning Chariots and Cavalry General, because this star is marking itself and stand alone in Chariots and Cavalry General asterism, Root mansion (see : Chinese constellation).
