= Eta Lupi =

Probable triple star system in the constellation of Lupus

η Lupi
- Location of η Lupi (circled in red)

Observation data Epoch J2000.0 Equinox J2000.0 (ICRS)
- Constellation: Lupus
- Right ascension: 16^{h} 00^{m} 07.32786^{s}
- Declination: −38° 23′ 48.1513″
- Apparent magnitude (V): 3.41 (3.37 + 7.50 + 10.85)

Characteristics
- Spectral type: B2 IV + A5 Vp + F5 V
- U−B color index: −0.83
- B−V color index: −0.22

Astrometry
Radial velocity (R_{v})	+1.00±3.80 km/s
Proper motion (μ)	RA: −16.96 mas/yr Dec.: −27.83 mas/yr
Parallax (π)	7.38±0.18 mas
Distance	440 ± 10 ly (136 ± 3 pc)
Absolute magnitude (M_{V})	−2.24

Details

η Lup A
Mass	7.0±0.2 M_{☉}
Radius	6.7 R_{☉}
Luminosity	1,729 L_{☉}
Temperature	14,668 K
Rotational velocity (v sin i)	242 km/s
Age	39.8±9.2 Myr

Other designations
- η Lup, CD−38°10797, HD 143118, HIP 78384, HR 5948, SAO 207208

Database references
SIMBAD	data

η Lupi, often Latinised as Eta Lupi, is a probable triple star system in the southern constellation of Lupus. It is visible to the naked eye with an apparent visual magnitude of 3.41. Based upon an annual parallax shift of 27.80 mas as seen from Earth, it is located around 136 parsecs (440 ly) distant from the Sun. It is a member of the Upper Centaurus–Lupus subgroup of the nearby Sco OB2 association.

The inner pair in this triple system has an estimated orbital period of around 27,000 years. As of 2013, they had an angular separation of 15.0 arc seconds along a position angle of 19°. The primary star, component A, is an evolving A-type subgiant star with a stellar classification of B2 IV. It has used up the supply of hydrogen at its core and has begun to expand off the main-sequence.

The secondary, component B, is a chemically peculiar A-type main sequence star with a class of A5 Vp and an estimated mass 2.10 times that of the Sun. The outer member, component C, has an orbital period of around half a million years. As of 2007, it had an angular separation of 115.8 arc seconds along a position angle of 248° from the primary. It is an F-type main sequence star with a classification of F5 V and an estimated 1.29 times the Sun's mass.
