= Sigma Lupi =

B-type main-sequence star

- Location of σ Lupi (circled in red)

Observation data Epoch J2000.0 Equinox J2000.0 (ICRS)
- Constellation: Lupus
- Right ascension: 14^{h} 32^{m} 37.05667^{s}
- Declination: −50° 27′ 25.7746″
- Apparent magnitude (V): 4.416

Characteristics
- Spectral type: B1/B2 V
- U−B color index: −0.84
- B−V color index: −0.19
- Variable type: Uncertain, SX Arietis variable

Astrometry
Radial velocity (R_{v})	−1.5±2.7 km/s
Proper motion (μ)	RA: −29.26 mas/yr Dec.: −15.72 mas/yr
Parallax (π)	5.67±0.19 mas
Distance	580 ± 20 ly (176 ± 6 pc)
Absolute magnitude (M_{V})	−1.79

Details
Mass	9.0±0.5 M_{☉}
Radius	4.8±0.5 R_{☉}
Luminosity	5,754 L_{☉}
Surface gravity (log g)	4.02±0.10 cgs
Temperature	23,000±550 K
Rotation	3.01938±0.00022 d
Rotational velocity (v sin i)	68±6 km/s
Age	13.4 Myr

Other designations
- σ Lup, CD−49°8831, HD 127381, HIP 71121, HR 5425, SAO 241781

Database references
SIMBAD	data

Sigma Lupi, Latinized from σ Lupi, is a star in the southern constellation of Lupus. It is visible to the naked eye with an apparent visual magnitude of 4.4. Based upon an annual parallax shift of 5.67 mas as seen from Earth, it is located about 580 light years from the Sun. It is a member of the Upper Centaurus–Lupus subgroup of the nearby Sco OB2 association. D. vander Linden and Christiaan L. Sterken discovered that the star is a variable star, based on data obtained in 1984, and announced their discovery in 1987.

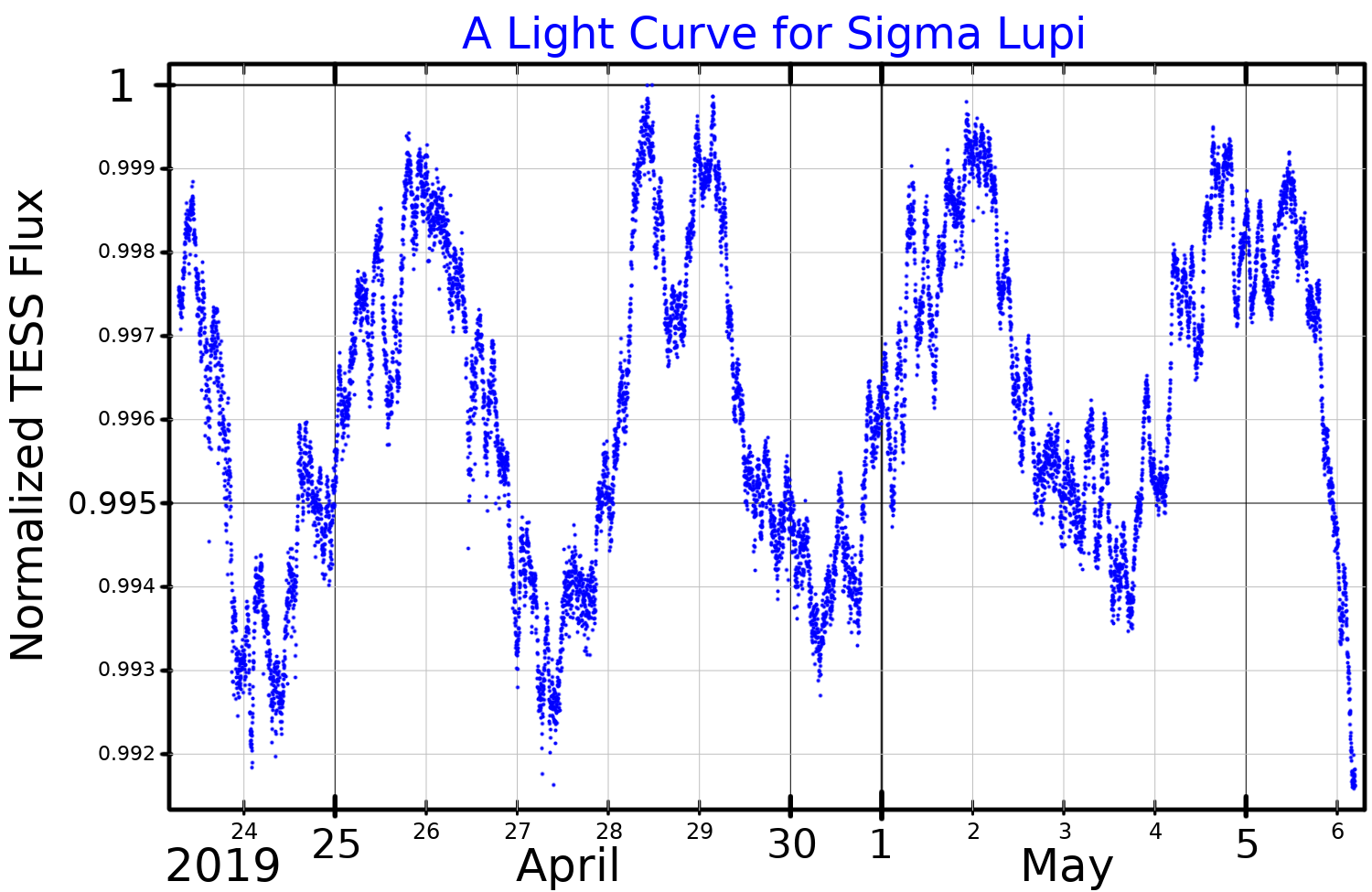
A light curve for Sigma Lupi, plotted from TESS data

This is a B-type main sequence star with a stellar classification of B1/B2 V. Sigma Lupi is a Helium strong star with an enhanced abundance nitrogen and an underabundance of carbon. Jerzykiewicz and Sterken (1992) showed a small amplitude variability with a period of 3.02 days. This suggests it is a close binary system forming a rotating ellipsoidal variable, although other causes such as rotational modulation can not be ruled out. There is a higher frequency photometric variability with a rate of 10.93482 per day and an amplitude of 0.0031 in visual magnitude, but the cause of this is unknown.

At an age of just 13.4 million years, Sigma Lupi is spinning with a projected rotational velocity of 68 km/s giving it a rotation period of 3.02 days. A magnetic field has been detected with a polar field strength of around 500 G, which is varying longitudinally with an amplitude of around 100 G. The star has an estimated nine times the mass of the Sun and 4.8 times the Sun's radius. It is radiating 5,754 times the solar luminosity from its outer atmosphere at an effective temperature of around 23,000 K.
