= Chi Lupi =

Star in the constellation Lupus

χ Lupi
- Location of χ Lupi (circled in red)

Observation data Epoch J2000.0 Equinox J2000.0 (ICRS)
- Constellation: Lupus
- Right ascension: 15^{h} 50^{m} 57.5376^{s}
- Declination: −33° 37′ 37.796″
- Apparent magnitude (V): 3.982±0.018

Characteristics
- Spectral type: B9.5V + A2Vm + K3V
- U−B color index: −0.13
- B−V color index: −0.04
- R−I color index: −0.07

Astrometry
| Proper motion (μ) | RA: −5.10 mas/yr Dec.: −24.85 mas/yr |
| Parallax (π) | 16.71±0.27 mas |
| Distance | 203.1±5.5 ly (62.27±1.70 pc) |

Orbit
| Primary | χ Lup A |
| Name | χ Lup B |
| Period (P) | 15.256560(71) days |
| Semi-major axis (a) | 0.2030±0.0029 au |
| Eccentricity (e) | 0.0076±0.0054 |
| Inclination (i) | 110.2±2.1° |
| Longitude of the node (Ω) | −127.1±1.5° |
| Periastron epoch (T) | 2,438,434.4±1.7 JD |
| Argument of periastron (ω) (secondary) | 116±40° |

Orbit
| Primary | χ Lup Ab |
| Name | χ Lup C |
| Period (P) | 9 years |
| Semi-major axis (a) | 7.5 au |

Details

χ Lup A
| Mass | 2.84±0.12 M_{☉} |
| Radius | 2.85±0.15 R_{☉} |
| Luminosity | 63 L_{☉} |
| Surface gravity (log g) | 4.08 cgs |
| Temperature | 10,200 K |
| Rotational velocity (v sin i) | 0 km/s |
| Age | 280±30 Myr |

χ Lup B
| Mass | 1.94±0.09 M_{☉} |
| Radius | 1.75±0.18 R_{☉} |
| Surface gravity (log g) | 4.2 cgs |
| Temperature | 9,200 K |

χ Lup C
| Mass | 0.79 M_{☉} |

Other designations
- χ Lup, Chi Lupi, Chi Lup, 5 Lupi, 5 Lup, CD−33 10754, CPD−33 3933, FK5 586, GC 21281, HD 141556, HIP 77634, HR 5883, PPM 294334, SAO 207040

Database references
| SIMBAD | data |

Chi Lupi (Chi Lup, χ Lupi, χ Lup) is a triple star system in the constellation of Lupus. It has an apparent visual magnitude of approximately 3.957.

The primary star in the binary is a mercury-manganese star of spectral type B9.5V; the secondary is a metallic-lined star of type A2Vm. The tertiary is a red dwarf.

This system is a proper motion member of the Upper Scorpius sub-group in the Scorpius–Centaurus OB association, the nearest such co-moving association of massive stars to the Sun. The Upper Scorpius subgroup contains thousands of stars with an average age of 11 million years old at mean distances of 145 parsecs (470 light years).
