= Rho Lupi =

Star in the constellation Lupus

- Location of ρ Lupi (circled in red)

Observation data Epoch J2000.0 Equinox J2000.0 (ICRS)
- Constellation: Lupus
- Right ascension: 14^{h} 37^{m} 53.22583^{s}
- Declination: −49° 25′ 32.9798″
- Apparent magnitude (V): 4.05

Characteristics
- Spectral type: B3/4 V
- U−B color index: −0.56
- B−V color index: −0.15

Astrometry
Radial velocity (R_{v})	8.00±7.40 km/s
Proper motion (μ)	RA: −28.26 mas/yr Dec.: −28.82 mas/yr
Parallax (π)	10.32±0.16 mas
Distance	316 ± 5 ly (97 ± 2 pc)
Absolute magnitude (M_{V})	−0.88

Details
Mass	4.66 M_{☉}
Radius	3.4 R_{☉}
Luminosity	365 L_{☉}
Temperature	15,947±542 K
Rotational velocity (v sin i)	166 km/s
Age	44 Myr

Other designations
- ρ Lup, CD−48°9198, FK5 3158, HD 128345, HIP 71536, HR 5453, SAO 225071

Database references
SIMBAD	data

Rho Lupi, Latinized from ρ Lupi, is a solitary star in the southern constellation of Lupus. It is visible to the naked eye with an apparent visual magnitude of 4.05. Based upon an annual parallax shift of 10.32 mas as seen from Earth, it is located about 316 light years from the Sun. It is a member of the Upper Centaurus–Lupus subgroup of the nearby Scorpius–Centaurus association.

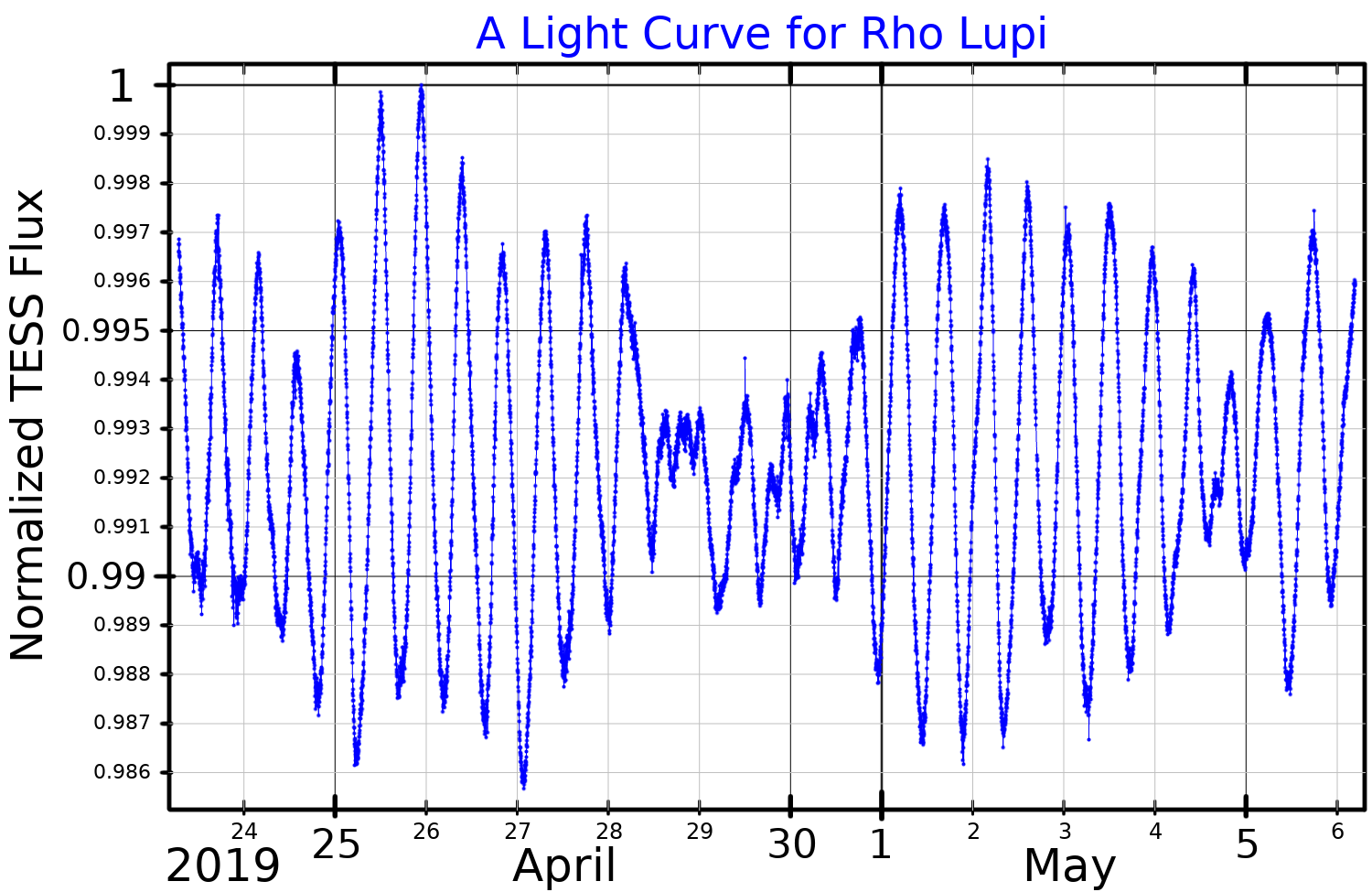
A light curve for Rho Lupi, plotted from TESS data

This is a B-type main sequence star with a stellar classification of B3/4 V. Rho Lupi was discovered to be a variable star when the Hipparcos data was analyzed. It is a microvariable with a period of 10.7 hours and an amplitude of 0.0046 in magnitude. With an age of just 44 million years, the star is spinning with a projected rotational velocity of 166 km/s. This is giving the star an oblate shape with an equatorial bulge that is an estimated 6% larger than the polar radius. It has an estimated 4.66 times the mass of the Sun and about 3.4 times the Sun's radius. It is radiating 365 times the solar luminosity from its outer atmosphere at an effective temperature of 15,947 K.
