= 2 Lupi =

Star in the constellation Lupus

- Location of 2 Lupi (circled in red)

Observation data Epoch J2000 Equinox J2000
- Constellation: Lupus
- Right ascension: 15^{h} 17^{m} 49.83809^{s}
- Declination: −30° 08′ 55.2165″
- Apparent magnitude (V): 4.33

Characteristics
- Evolutionary stage: giant
- Spectral type: K0 IIIa CH-1
- B−V color index: 1.100±0.004
- Variable type: none

Astrometry
Radial velocity (R_{v})	−2.91±0.15 km/s
Proper motion (μ)	RA: −10.16 mas/yr Dec.: −3.66 mas/yr
Parallax (π)	10.01±0.21 mas
Distance	326 ± 7 ly (100 ± 2 pc)
Absolute magnitude (M_{V})	−0.65

Details
Radius	11.0+0.7 −0.8 R_{☉}
Luminosity	65.6±0.8 L_{☉}
Surface gravity (log g)	2.84 cgs
Temperature	4,953+197 −148 K
Metallicity [Fe/H]	0.11 dex

Other designations
- f Lupi, 2 Lup, NSV 7012, CD−29°11630, FK5 3207, HD 135758, HIP 74857, HR 5686, SAO 183346

Database references
SIMBAD	data

2 Lupi, also known by its Bayer designation f Lupi, is a solitarystar in the southern constellation of Lupus, situated approximately 326 light-years away from the Sun. It has the Bayer designation f Lupi; 2 Lupi is the Flamsteed designation. It is visible to the naked eye as a faint, orange-hued star with an apparent visual magnitude of 4.33. It is moving closer to the Earth with a heliocentric radial velocity of −3 km/s.

This is an aging giant star with a stellar classification of K0 IIIa CH-1. The suffix notation indicates abnormally weak lines of carbyne. Having exhausted the hydrogen at its core, the star evolved away from the main sequence by expanding to 11 times the Sun's radius. The star is radiating 65.6 times the luminosity of the Sun from its enlarged photosphere at an effective temperature of 4,953 K.

2 Lupi is also moving steadily toward our solar system at a rate of roughly –3 km/s. This slow approach is observable through its measured radial velocity.
