= Tau1 Lupi =

Star in the constellation Lupus

Tau^{1} Lupi
- Location of τ^{1} Lupi (circled in red)

Observation data Epoch J2000.0 Equinox J2000.0 (ICRS)
- Constellation: Lupus
- Right ascension: 14^{h} 26^{m} 08.22424^{s}
- Declination: −45° 13′ 17.1315″
- Apparent magnitude (V): 4.546

Characteristics
- Spectral type: B2 IV
- B−V color index: −0.146
- Variable type: β Cep

Astrometry
Radial velocity (R_{v})	−21.5±2.8 km/s
Proper motion (μ)	RA: −13.09 mas/yr Dec.: −14.67 mas/yr
Parallax (π)	2.99±0.21 mas
Distance	1,090 ± 80 ly (330 ± 20 pc)
Absolute magnitude (M_{V})	−3.05

Details
Mass	9.98±0.63 M_{☉}
Radius	7.1 R_{☉}
Luminosity	3,831 L_{☉}
Luminosity (bolometric)	11,321 L_{☉}
Temperature	15,273 K
Metallicity [Fe/H]	−0.39±0.16 dex
Rotational velocity (v sin i)	30 km/s
Age	20.8±0.9 Myr

Other designations
- τ^{1} Lup, CD−44°9322, FK5 1377, HD 126341, HIP 70574, HR 5395, SAO 224919

Database references
SIMBAD	data

Tau^{1} Lupi, Latinized from τ^{1} Lupi, is a solitary star in the southern constellation of Lupus. It is visible to the naked eye with an apparent visual magnitude of 4.5. Based upon an annual parallax shift of only 2.99 mas as seen from Earth, it is located about 1,090 light years from the Sun. Tau^{1} Lupi may be a runaway star having a peculiar velocity of 32.6±3.6 km/s. It is a member of the Upper Centaurus–Lupus sub-group of the nearby Sco OB2 association.

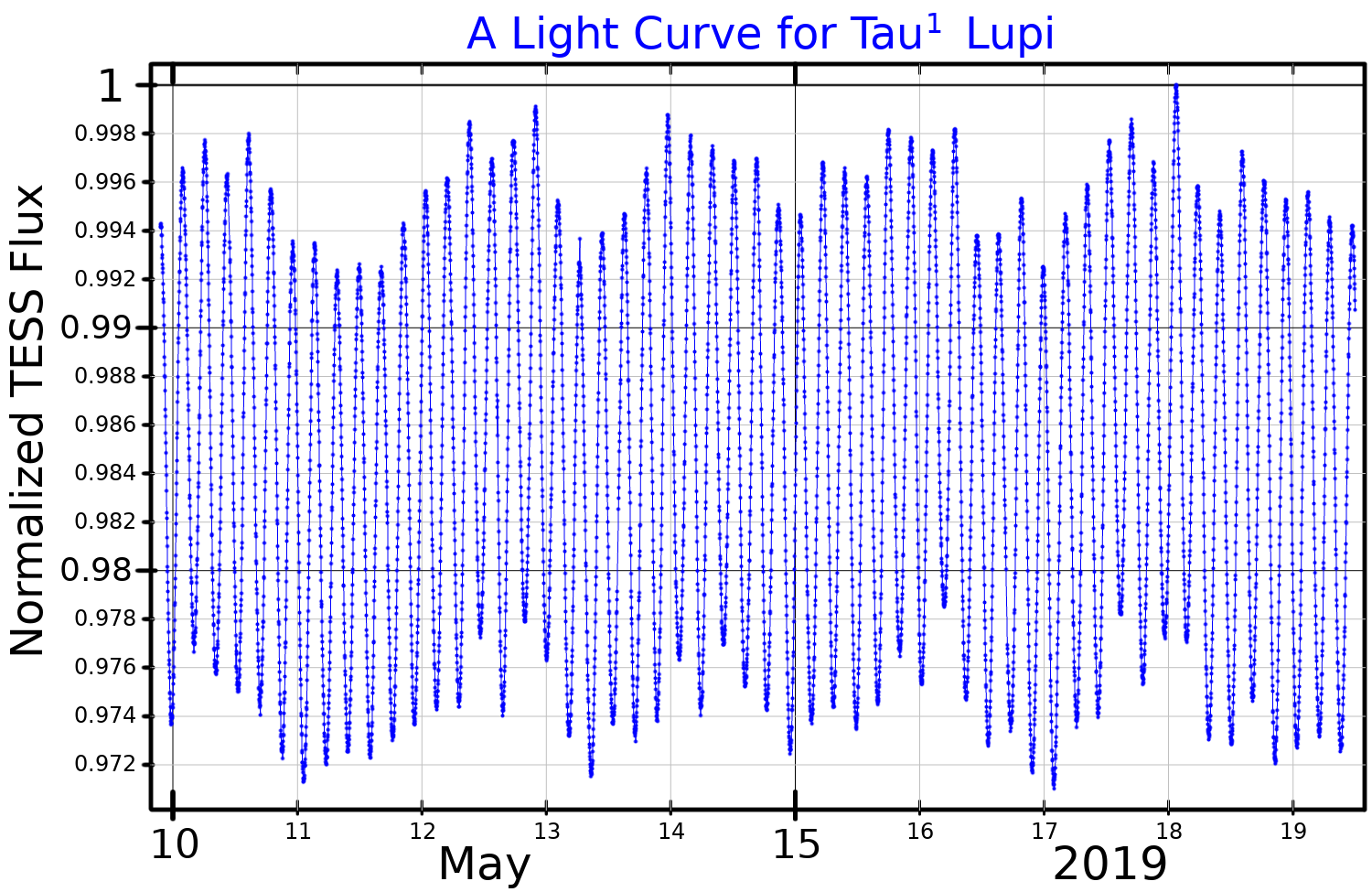
A light curve for Tau^{1} Lupi, plotted from TESS data

This is a B-type subgiant star with a stellar classification of B2 IV. It was determined to be a Beta Cephei variable based on observations during 1955 at the Cape Observatory. Tau^{1} Lupi shows a steady period of 0.17736934 days, corresponding to a frequency of 5.637953 cycles per day, with an amplitude of 0.035 in visual magnitude. It has around 10 times the mass of the Sun and 7 times the Sun's radius.

The star shows an infrared excess, which is unusual for a non-emission star of this class. The inner edge of the dust lies at a distance of 980 AU from the star with a temperature of 190 K, and it extends outward to as much as 50,000 AU where the temperature drops to 40 K. This optically thin dust is not related to the pulsational behavior of the star.
