= Phi2 Lupi =

Star in the constellation Lupus

Phi^{2} Lupi
- Location of φ^{2} Lupi (circled in red)

Observation data Epoch J2000.0 Equinox J2000.0 (ICRS)
- Constellation: Lupus
- Right ascension: 15^{h} 23^{m} 09.35005^{s}
- Declination: −36° 51′ 30.5521″
- Apparent magnitude (V): 4.535

Characteristics
- Spectral type: B4 V
- U−B color index: −0.648
- B−V color index: −0.161

Astrometry
Radial velocity (R_{v})	+0.80±2.70 km/s
Proper motion (μ)	RA: −18.24 mas/yr Dec.: −20.72 mas/yr
Parallax (π)	6.28±0.20 mas
Distance	520 ± 20 ly (159 ± 5 pc)
Absolute magnitude (M_{V})	−1.47

Details
Mass	6.1±0.1 M_{☉}
Radius	3.4 R_{☉}
Luminosity	800 L_{☉}
Temperature	16,780 K
Rotational velocity (v sin i)	141±6 km/s
Age	39.9±10.1 Myr

Other designations
- φ^{2} Lup, CD−36°10103, FK5 1403, HD 136664, HIP 75304, HR 5712, SAO 206580

Database references
SIMBAD	data

Phi^{2} Lupi, Latinized from φ^{2} Lupi, is a solitary star in the southern constellation of Lupus. With an apparent magnitude of 4.535, it is bright enough to be seen with the naked eye. Based upon an annual parallax shift of 6.28 mas as seen from Earth, it is located around 520 light years from the Sun. At that distance, the visual magnitude of the star is diminished by an extinction factor of 0.052±0.013 due to interstellar dust. It is a member of the Upper Centaurus–Lupus subgroup of the Scorpius–Centaurus association.

This is an ordinary B-type main sequence star with a stellar classification of B4 V. It has an estimated 6.1 times the mass of the Sun and about 3.4 times the Sun's radius. The star is roughly 40 million years and is spinning with a projected rotational velocity of 141 km/s. It is radiating about 800 times the solar luminosity from its photosphere at an effective temperature of 16,780 K.
