= Gamma Lupi =

Triple star system in the constellation Lupus

- Location of γ Lupi (circled)

Observation data Epoch J2000.0 Equinox ICRS
- Constellation: Lupus
- Right ascension: 15^{h} 35^{m} 08.44835^{s}
- Declination: −41° 10′ 00.3247″
- Apparent magnitude (V): 2.77

Characteristics
- Spectral type: B2 IV
- U−B color index: −0.82
- B−V color index: −0.20

Astrometry
Radial velocity (R_{v})	−1.5±0.7 km/s
Proper motion (μ)	RA: −15.62 mas/yr Dec.: −25.43 mas/yr
Parallax (π)	7.75±0.50 mas
Distance	420 ± 30 ly (129 ± 8 pc)
Absolute magnitude (M_{V})	−2.4

Orbit
Primary	Aa
Name	Ab
Period (P)	2.849769 days
Semi-major axis (a)	16.0–19.3 R_{☉}
Eccentricity (e)	0
Semi-amplitude (K_{1}) (primary)	26.7±1.0 km/s

Orbit
Primary	A
Name	B
Period (P)	209.5±13.5 yr
Semi-major axis (a)	0.626±0.010" (81 AU (Note: Calculated using the parallax of 0.00775 arcseconds and the separation of 0.626 arcseconds. 0.626" / 0.00775" = 80.8 AU.))
Eccentricity (e)	0.488±0.015
Inclination (i)	95.8±1.5°
Longitude of the node (Ω)	273.2±1.5°
Periastron epoch (T)	B 2096.4±7.0
Argument of periastron (ω) (secondary)	320.9±4.0°

Details

γ Lup Aa
Mass	6–10 M_{☉}
Radius	3.92–5.39 R_{☉}
Luminosity	2,570–4,700 L_{☉}
Surface gravity (log g)	3.867–4.130 cgs
Temperature	20,900 K
Rotational velocity (v sin i)	270 km/s
Age	16.7+5.0 −6.6 Myr

γ Lup Ab
Mass	0.72–1.93 M_{☉}
Radius	2.00–3.47 R_{☉}
Luminosity	2.39–10.7 L_{☉}
Surface gravity (log g)	3.515–3.803 cgs
Temperature	4,140–7,210 K

Other designations
- γ Lup, CD−40°9760, HD 138690, HIP 76297, HR 5776, SAO 225938

Database references
SIMBAD	data

Gamma Lupi, Latinized from γ Lupi, is a triple star system in the constellation of Lupus. It is easily visible to the naked eye, having an apparent magnitude of 2.77. It is also known in ancient Chinese astronomy as 騎官一 or "the 1st (star) of the Cavalry Officer". With a telescope, Gamma Lupi can be resolved into a binary star system in close orbit. This is known as the Gamma Lupi AB system, often abbreviated as γ Lupi AB or γ Lup AB.

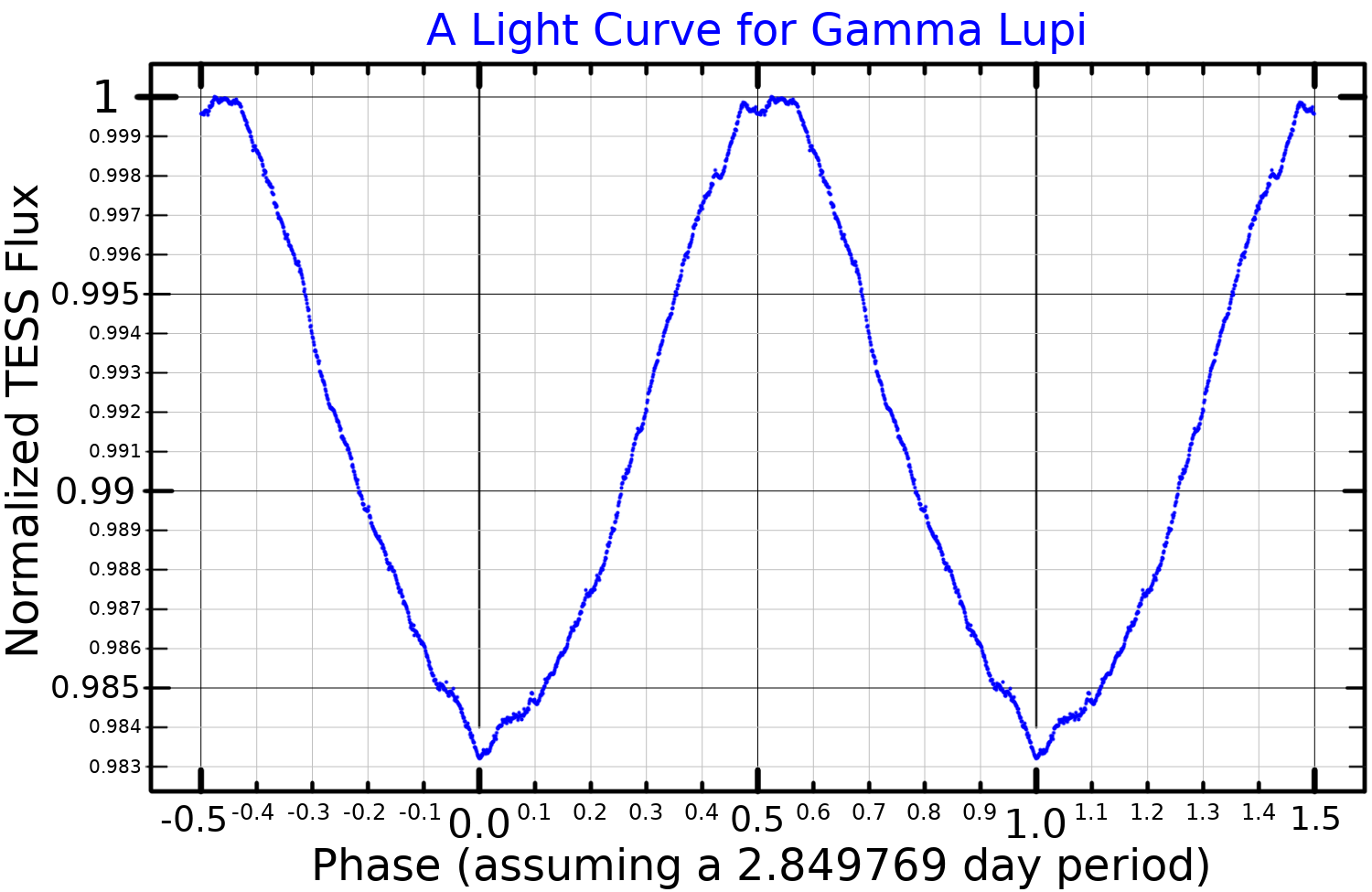
A light curve for Gamma Lupi, plotted from TESS data

The system has a hierarchical architecture. The primary, Gamma Lupi A is itself a spectroscopic binary with an orbital period of 2.849769 days. Although the system does not show eclipses, the hotter star of the pair heats the side of the cooler star that faces it, and as they orbit each other the combined starlight varies in brightness by about 0.02 magnitudes, as seen from the Earth. The outer component, Gamma Lupi B, is widely-separated, with a semi-major axis of 81 astronomical units and an orbital period of 210 years.

This star is a proper motion member of the Upper Centaurus–Lupus sub-group in the Scorpius–Centaurus OB association, the nearest such co-moving association of massive stars to the Sun.

== See also ==
- Traditional Chinese star names#Lupus
