= Tau2 Lupi =

Binary star system in the constellation Lupus

Tau^{2} Lupi
- Location of τ^{2} Lupi (circled in red)

Observation data Epoch J2000.0 Equinox J2000.0 (ICRS)
- Constellation: Lupus
- Right ascension: 14^{h} 26^{m} 10.81378^{s}
- Declination: −45° 22′ 45.4023″
- Apparent magnitude (V): 4.34 (4.93 + 5.55)

Characteristics
- Spectral type: F4 IV + A7:
- U−B color index: +0.16
- B−V color index: +0.43

Astrometry
Radial velocity (R_{v})	−0.60±1.60 km/s
Proper motion (μ)	RA: +14.62 mas/yr Dec.: −7.33 mas/yr
Parallax (π)	10.22±0.31 mas
Distance	319 ± 10 ly (98 ± 3 pc)
Absolute magnitude (M_{V})	−0.62

Orbit
Period (P)	26.2 yr
Semi-major axis (a)	0.125″
Eccentricity (e)	0.94
Inclination (i)	56.0°
Longitude of the node (Ω)	175.7°
Periastron epoch (T)	1969.1
Argument of periastron (ω) (secondary)	191.0°

Details
Luminosity	150 L_{☉}
Rotational velocity (v sin i)	0 km/s

Other designations
- τ^{2} Lup, CD−44°9323, HD 126354, HIP 70576, HR 5396, SAO 224920

Database references
SIMBAD	data

Tau^{2} Lupi, Latinized from τ^{2} Lup, is a binary star system in the constellation Lupus. It is visible to the naked eye with a combined apparent visual magnitude of 4.34. Based upon an annual parallax shift of 10.22 mas as seen from Earth, it is located around 319 light years from the Sun. The two components orbit each other with a period of 26.2 years and a high eccentricity of 0.94. The brighter component is a magnitude 4.93 subgiant star with a stellar classification of F4 IV. Its companion is an A-type star with visual magnitude 5.55 and class A7:.
