= Phi1 Lupi =

Star in the constellation Lupus

φ^{1} Lupi
- Location of φ^{1} Lupi (circled)

Observation data Epoch J2000.0 Equinox J2000.0 (ICRS)
- Constellation: Lupus
- Right ascension: 15^{h} 21^{m} 48.36967^{s}
- Declination: −36° 15′ 40.9525″
- Apparent magnitude (V): 3.58

Characteristics
- Spectral type: K5 III
- U−B color index: +1.85
- B−V color index: +1.534±0.005

Astrometry
Radial velocity (R_{v})	−29.4±0.7 km/s
Proper motion (μ)	RA: −92.33 mas/yr Dec.: −85.67 mas/yr
Parallax (π)	11.86±0.16 mas
Distance	275 ± 4 ly (84 ± 1 pc)
Absolute magnitude (M_{V})	−1.55

Details
Mass	1.78 M_{☉}
Radius	40 R_{☉}
Luminosity	1,413 L_{☉}
Surface gravity (log g)	1.93 cgs
Temperature	3,800 K
Metallicity [Fe/H]	−0.40 dex

Other designations
- φ^{1} Lup, CD−35°10236, FK5 566, HD 136422, HIP 75177, HR 5705, SAO 206552

Database references
SIMBAD	data

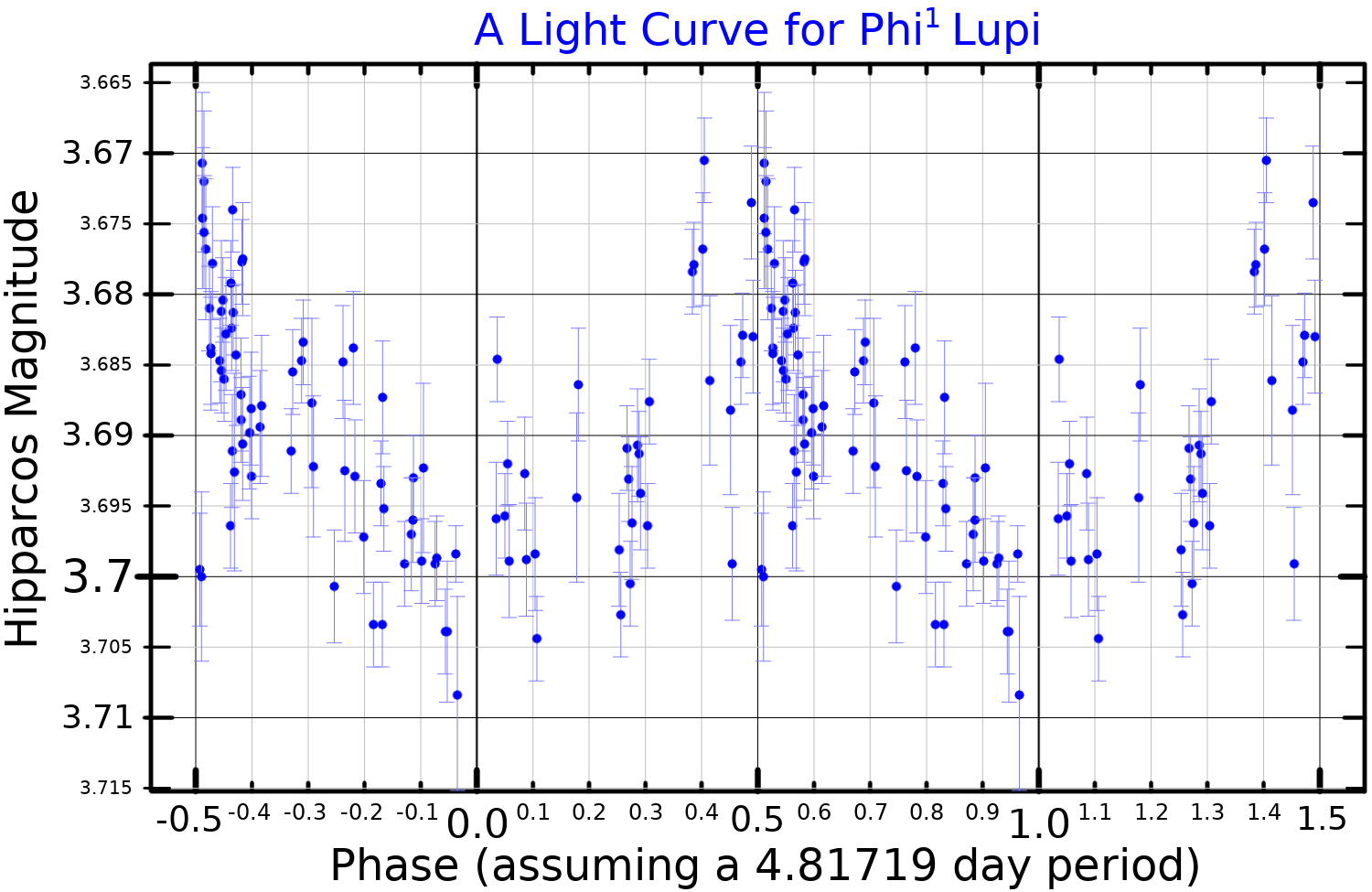
A light curve for Phi^{1} Lupi, plotted from Hipparcos data

Phi^{1} Lupi is a solitary star in the southern constellation of Lupus. It is visible to the naked eye with an apparent visual magnitude of 3.58. Based upon an annual parallax shift of 11.86 mas as seen from Earth, it is located around 275 light years from the Sun. The star is drifting closer with a radial velocity of −29 km/s. It has an absolute magnitude of −1.55.

This is an evolved K-type giant star with a stellar classification of K5 III, which means it has used up its core hydrogen and has expanded. At present it has 40 times the radius of the Sun. It is a variable star of unknown type, with an amplitude of 0.008 in visual magnitude and a period of 4.82 days. The star is radiating 1,413 times the luminosity of the Sun from its enlarged photosphere at an effective temperature of 3,800 K.
