= 1 Lupi =

Star in the constellation Lupus

- Location of 1 Lupi (circled in red)

Observation data Epoch J2000.0 Equinox J2000.0
- Constellation: Lupus
- Right ascension: 15^{h} 14^{m} 37.32104^{s}
- Declination: −31° 31′ 08.8434″
- Apparent magnitude (V): 4.90

Characteristics
- Spectral type: F1 III or F0 Ib-II
- U−B color index: +0.26
- B−V color index: 0.37

Astrometry
Radial velocity (R_{v})	−22.80 km/s
Proper motion (μ)	RA: −9.873 mas/yr Dec.: –0.892 mas/yr
Parallax (π)	1.8055±0.1876 mas
Distance	approx. 1,800 ly (approx. 550 pc)
Absolute magnitude (M_{V})	−3.93

Details
Mass	6.9±0.1 M_{☉}
Radius	41.3+2.2 −1.7 R_{☉}
Luminosity	2,900 L_{☉}
Temperature	6,867 K
Rotational velocity (v sin i)	3.9±0.2 km/s
Age	47.1±3.8 Myr

Other designations
- i Lup, 1 Lup, CD−31°11813, HD 135153, HIP 74604, HR 5660, SAO 206445

Database references
SIMBAD	data

1 Lupi is a solitary giant star in the southern constellation of Lupus. It has the Bayer designation i Lupi; 1 Lupi is the Flamsteed designation. The apparent visual magnitude is 4.90, which indicates it is faintly visible to the naked eye. Based on parallax measurements, this star is approximately 1,800 light-years from the Sun. It is moving closer to the Earth with a heliocentric radial velocity of −23 km/s.

Houk (1978) assigned the spectral classification of this star as F1III, which suggests it is an F-type (yellow-white) star that has evolved away from the main sequence and expanded into a giant. However, Gray et al. (2001) found a class of F0 Ib-II, matching a supergiant/bright giant star. It has a mass around seven times that of the Sun and has expanded to 41 times the Sun's radius. The star is radiating 2,900 times the luminosity of the Sun from its enlarged photosphere at an effective temperature of 6,867 K. The estimated age of the star is around 47 million years.
