= Delta Lupi =

Star in the constellation of Lupus

δ Lupi
- Location of δ Lupi (circled)

Observation data Epoch J2000.0 Equinox J2000.0
- Constellation: Lupus
- Right ascension: 15^{h} 21^{m} 22.32168^{s}
- Declination: −40° 38′ 51.0738″
- Apparent magnitude (V): 3.20 - 3.24

Characteristics
- Spectral type: B1.5 IV
- U−B color index: −0.910
- B−V color index: −0.224
- Variable type: β Cep

Astrometry
Radial velocity (R_{v})	+0.2 km/s
Proper motion (μ)	RA: −19.49 mas/yr Dec.: −25.29 mas/yr
Parallax (π)	3.69±0.54 mas
Distance	approx. 900 ly (approx. 270 pc)
Absolute magnitude (M_{V})	−3.1

Details
Mass	11.9±0.2 M_{☉}
Radius	6.1 R_{☉}
Luminosity	10,000 L_{☉}
Surface gravity (log g)	3.86 cgs
Temperature	22,908 K
Metallicity [Fe/H]	−0.25±0.11 dex
Rotational velocity (v sin i)	230 km/s
Age	15.4±1.3 Myr

Other designations
- CD−40°9538, FK5 1402, HD 136298, HIP 75141, HR 5695, SAO 225691, UBV 13201

Database references
SIMBAD	data

Delta Lupi (δ Lupi, δ Lup) is a star in the southern circumpolar constellation of Lupus. In traditional Chinese astronomy, it is "the 2nd (star) of the Cavalry Officer" (騎官二). With an apparent visual magnitude of 3.2, it is the fourth-brightest star in the constellation. The distance to this star has been measured using the parallax technique, yielding an estimate of roughly 900 light-years with a 15% margin of error.

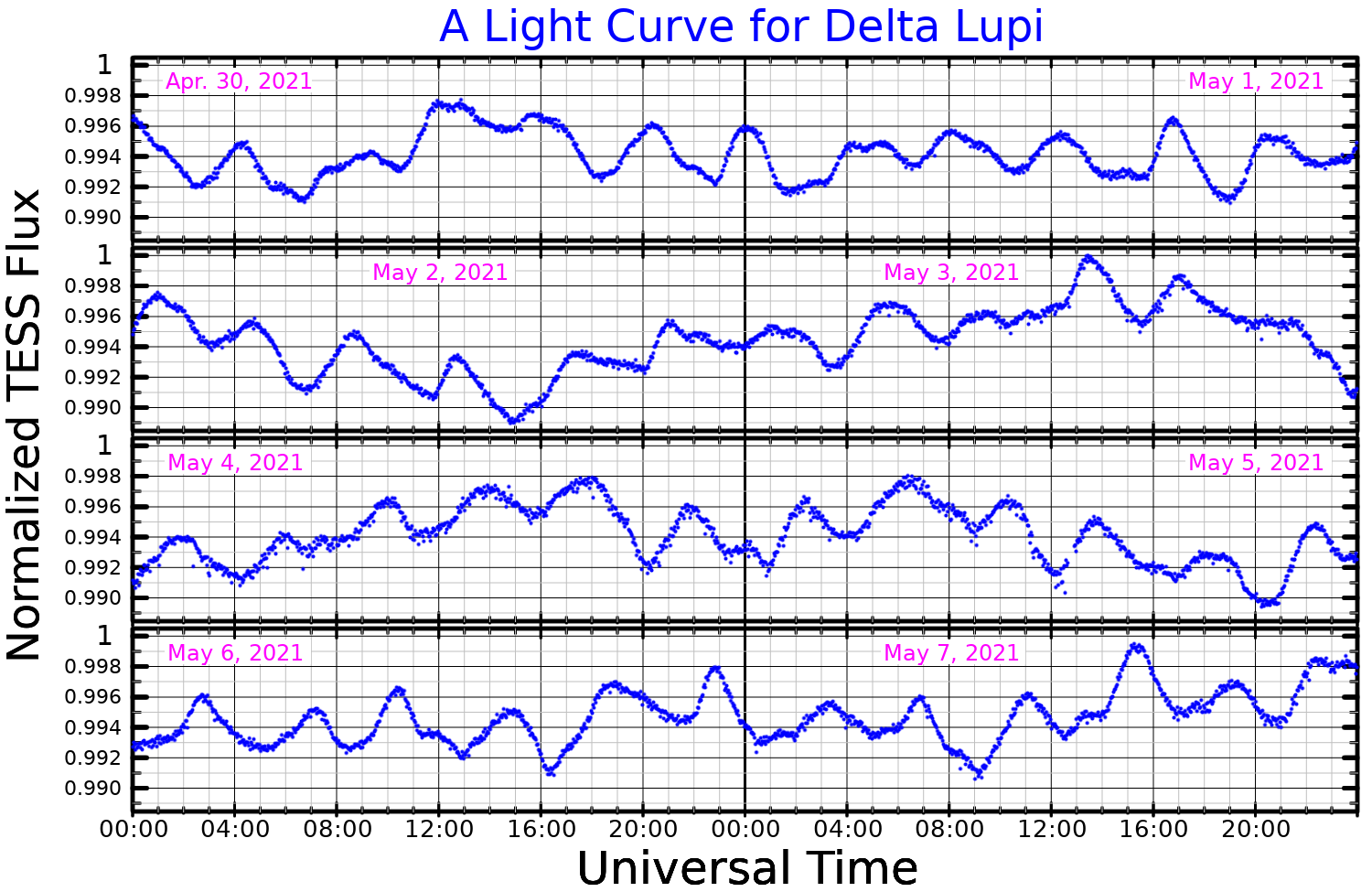
A light curve for Delta Lupi, plotted from TESS data

The spectrum of this star matches a stellar classification of B1.5 IV, which indicates this star has entered the subgiant stage and is in the process of evolving into a giant star. It is radiating around 10,000 times the luminosity of the Sun from its outer atmosphere at an effective temperature of 23,000 K, giving it a blue-white hue. This star has nearly 12 times the mass of the Sun and is roughly 15 million years old.

Delta Lupi is a Beta Cephei variable star that undergoes periodic pulsations. It has a single period of variability lasting 0.1655 days, or six cycles per day. This is a proper motion member of the Upper Centaurus–Lupus sub-group in the Scorpius–Centaurus OB association, the nearest such co-moving association of massive stars to the Sun.

== See also ==
- Traditional Chinese star names#Lupus
