= Lupus (constellation) =

Constellation in the southern celestial hemisphere

- Constellation
- List of stars in Lupus
- Abbreviation: Lup
- Genitive: Lupi
- Pronunciation: /ˈljuːpəs/, genitive /-paɪ/
- Symbolism: The Wolf
- Right ascension: 15.3^{h}
- Declination: −45°
- Quadrant: SQ3
- Area: 334 sq. deg. (46th)
- Main stars: 9
- Bayer/Flamsteed stars: 41
- Stars brighter than 3.00^{m}: 3
- Stars within 10.00 pc (32.62 ly): 1
- Brightest star: α Lup (Uridim) (2.30^{m})
- Nearest star: Gliese 588
- Messier objects: 0
- Meteor showers: Theta Centaurids (border)
- Bordering constellations: Norma; Scorpius; Circinus; Centaurus; Libra; Hydra (corner)
- Visible at latitudes between +35° and −90°. Best visible at 21:00 (9 p.m.) during the month of June.

Lupus is a constellation of the mid-Southern Sky. Its name is Latin for wolf. Lupus was one of the 48 constellations listed by the 2nd-century astronomer Ptolemy, and it remains one of the 88 modern constellations but was mostly considered an asterism associated with the nearby constellation Centaurus.

== History and mythology ==
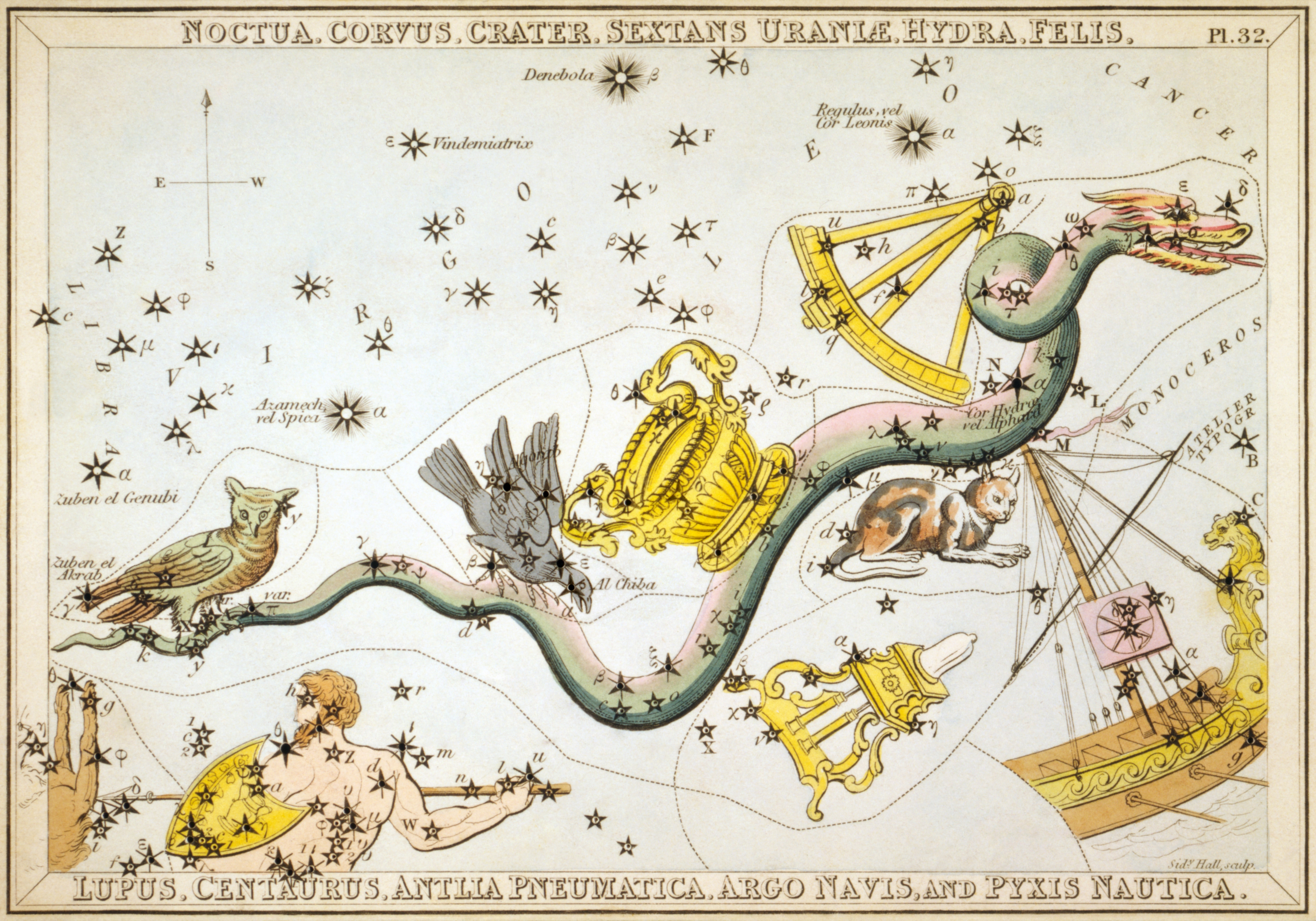
Lupus is located in the bottom-left corner of card 32 in Urania's Mirror (1825)

In ancient times, the constellation was considered an asterism within Centaurus, and was considered to have been an arbitrary animal, killed, or about to be killed, on behalf of, or for, Centaurus. An alternative visualization, attested by Eratosthenes, saw this constellation as a wineskin held by Centaurus. It was not separated from Centaurus until Hipparchus of Bithynia named it Therion (Medieval Latin: Fera meaning "beast") in the 2nd century BC.

The Greek constellation is probably based on the Babylonian figure known as the Mad Dog (UR.IDIM). This was a strange hybrid creature that combined the head and torso of a man with the legs and tail of a lion (the cuneiform sign 'UR' simply refers to a large carnivore; lions, wolves and dogs are all included). It is often found in association with the sun god and another mythical being called the Bison-man, which is supposedly related to the Greek constellation of Centaurus.

In Arab folk astronomy, Lupus, together with Centaurus were collectively called الشماريخ al-Shamareekh, meaning the dense branches of the date palm's fruit.

Later, in Islamic Medieval astronomy, it was named السبع al-Sab', which is a term used for any predatory wild beast (same as the Greek therion), as a separate constellation, but drawn together with Centaurus. In some manuscripts of Al-Sufi's Book of Fixed Stars and celestial globes, it was drawn as a lion; in others, it is drawn as a wolf, both conforming to the Sab' name.

In Europe, no particular animal was associated with it until the Latin translation of Ptolemy's work identified it with the wolf.

== Characteristics ==
Lupus is bordered by six different constellations, although one of them (Hydra) merely touches at the corner. The other five are Scorpius (the scorpion), Norma (the right angle), Circinus (the compass), Libra (the balance scale), and Centaurus (the centaur). Covering 333.7 square degrees and 0.809% of the night sky, it ranks 46th of the 88 modern constellations. The three-letter abbreviation for the constellation, as adopted by the International Astronomical Union in 1922, is Lup. The official constellation boundaries are defined by a twelve-sided polygon (illustrated in infobox). In the equatorial coordinate system, the right ascension coordinates of these borders lie between 14^{h} 17^{m} 48.0635^{s} and 16^{h} 08^{m} 36.6735^{s}, while the declination coordinates are between −29.83° and −55.58°. The whole constellation is visible to observers south of latitude 34°N. (Note: While parts of the constellation technically rise above the horizon to observers between 60°N and 34°N, stars within a few degrees of the horizon are, to all intents and purposes, unobservable.)

== Features ==
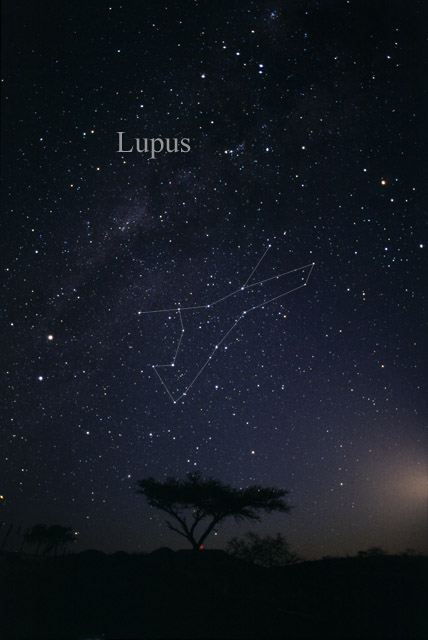
The constellation Lupus as it can be seen by the naked eye

=== Stars ===
Lacaille gave 29 stars Bayer designations Alpha through Psi including the Latin letters a through h in 1756 and labelled three stars as a and two stars as Kappa, Nu, Xi, Tau, Phi, and Psi. Johann Bode added the Latin letter d. In 1879, Benjamin Gould added Omega, i, and k, which he felt they were bright enough to warrant names. The Latin letter a dropped two of its stars, leaving a^{1} as the sole star designation.

Overall, there are 127 stars within the constellation's borders brighter than or equal to apparent magnitude 6.5. (Note: Objects of magnitude 6.5 are among the faintest visible to the unaided eye in suburban-rural transition night skies.). Alpha Lupi has the proper name Uridim since 12 September 2024. The name Uridim was from a Babylonian constellation named UR.IDIM (Uridimmu in the Akkadian language). Previously, in his book Star Names and Their Meanings, R. H. Allen gave the names Yang Mun for Alpha Lupi, the brightest star in Lupus, and KeKwan for the blue giant Beta Lupi, both from Chinese. However, the first name is in error; both stars were part of a large Chinese constellation known in modern transliteration as Qíguān, the Imperial Guards.

Most of the brightest stars in Lupus are massive members of the nearest OB association, Scorpius–Centaurus.

Alpha Lupi is an ageing blue giant star of spectral type B1.5 III that is 460 ± 10 light-years distant from Earth. It is a Beta Cephei variable, pulsating in brightness by 0.03 of a magnitude every 7 hours and 6 minutes.

=== Deep-sky objects ===
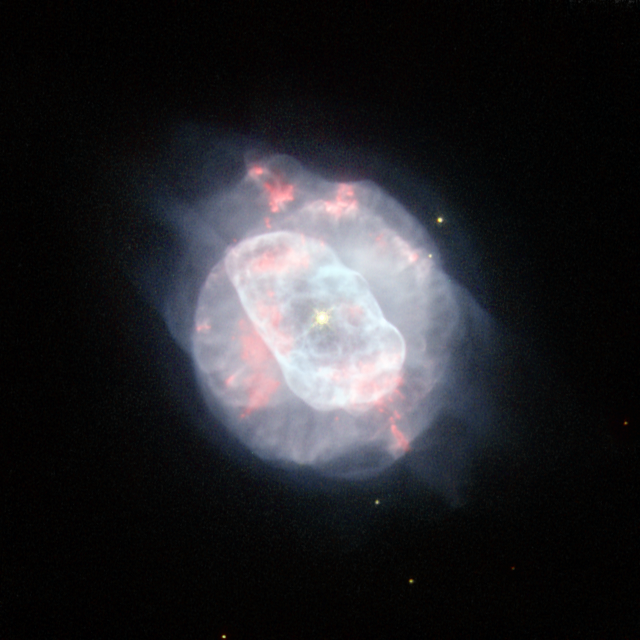
Planetary nebula NGC 5882 (HST/NASA/ESA)

Towards the north of the constellation are globular clusters NGC 5824 and NGC 5986, and close by the dark nebula B 228. To the south are two open clusters, NGC 5822 and NGC 5749, as well as globular cluster NGC 5927 on the eastern border with Norma. On the western border are two spiral galaxies and the Wolf–Rayet planetary nebula IC 4406, containing some of the hottest stars in existence. IC 4406, also called the Retina Nebula, is a cylindrical nebula at a distance of 5,000 light-years. It has dust lanes throughout its center. Another planetary nebula, NGC 5882, is towards the center of the constellation. The transiting exoplanet Lupus-TR-3b lies in this constellation. The historic supernova SN 1006 is described by various sources as appearing on April 30 to May 1, 1006, in the constellation of Lupus.

ESO 274-1 is a spiral galaxy seen from edge-on that requires an amateur telescope with at least 12 inches of aperture to view. It can be found by using Lambda Lupi and Mu Lupi as markers, and can only be seen under very dark skies. It is 9 arcminutes by 0.7 arcminutes with a small, elliptical nucleus.

== See also ==
- SN 1006, a supernova widely observed in the year 1006, as well as the brightest stellar event in recorded history.
- Chinese star names
- Lupus in Chinese astronomy
