= List of star systems within 450–500 light-years =

This is a list of star systems within 450-500 light years of Earth.

== List ==
Key
#	Visible to the unaided eye
$	Bright star (absolute magnitude of +8.5 or brighter)
‡	White dwarf
§	Brown dwarf or sub-brown dwarf
*	Nearest in constellation

System	Star or (sub-) brown dwarf	Distance (ly)	Constellation	Coordinates: RA, Dec (Ep J2000, Eq J2000)	Stellar class	Apparent magnitude (V)	Parallax (mas)	Notes and additional references
Gamma Circini	A	450	Circinus	15^{h} 23^{m} 22.643^{s} −59° 19′ 14.813″	B5 IV	4.94	7.27±0.81	
Gamma Circini	B	450	Circinus	15^{h} 23^{m} 22.643^{s} −59° 19′ 14.813″	F8 V	5.73	7.27±0.81	
HL Tauri		450	Taurus		K9			
GG Tauri	A	450	Taurus		K7	12.25 ± 0.03		
GG Tauri	B	450	Taurus		M2	14.70 ± 0.06		
GG Tauri	C	450	Taurus		M3	17.11 ± 0.07		
GG Tauri	D	450	Taurus		M5	19.94 ± 0.08		
GG Tauri	E	450	Taurus		M7			
L1551 IRS 5		450	Taurus		K3V/M3III			
1RXS J160929.1−210524		450 ± 1			K7V			Has 1 confirmed exoplanet (1RXS J160929.1-210524 b).
Pleione (BU Tauri/28 Tauri)		450 ± 8	Taurus		B8Vne	4.77 - 5.50		Part of Pleiades Cluster (M45).
V518 Carinae (HR 4196)		450 ± 10	Carina		B3/5V	4.82		Part of IC 2602 Open Cluster.
Mu Muscae		450 ± 10	Musca		K4III			
Delta Antliae	A	450 ± 10	Antlia		B9.5 V	+5.55		
Delta Antliae	B	450 ± 10	Antlia		F9 Ve			
38 Aquarii		450 ± 20	Aquarius		B5 III	5.43		
V357 Carinae		450 ± 20	Carina		B2IV-V	+3.41 - 3.44		
Iota Aurigae (Hassaleh)		450 ± 20	Auriga		K3 II–III	2.69		
28 Monocerotis		450 ± 20	Monoceros		K4III			
Chi Carinae		450 ± 30	Carina		B3IVp			
V1400 Centauri		450.8 ± 0.9	Centaurus		K5 IVe Li	12.2–15.6		
HD 100655 (Formosa)		451 ± 2			G9 III	6.45		
Rho Ophiuchi	A	451±12	Ophiuchus		B2/3V	4.63		Member of Rho Ophiuchi cloud complex.
Rho Ophiuchi	B	451±12	Ophiuchus		B2V			Member of Rho Ophiuchi cloud complex.
18 Tauri		452 ± 3	Taurus		B8 V	5.66		Part of Pleiades Cluster (M45).
K2-33		453 ± 1			M2		14.3	Has 1 exoplanet (K2-33b).
HD 96063 (Dingolay)		454 ± 2			K0	8.254		Has one confirmed exoplanet (HD 96063b/Ramajay).
PSR J1928+1815		455	Sagitta		PSR			The closest known Millisecond pulsar to earth.
Iota Herculis$ (Tianbang)		455 ± 8	Hercules	17^{h} 39^{m} 27.8864^{s} +46° 00′ 22.795″	B3IV	3.80#	7.17±0.13	
HD 28109		457			G			Has three exoplanets.
Alruba		457 ± 4			A0V	5.76		
HD 23853		459±4	Taurus		B9.5V	6.59		Part of Pleiades Cluster (M45).
IRAS 16293−2422	A	460			G			
IRAS 16293−2422	B	460			G			
XZ Tauri	A	460	Taurus		M2.0	10.40		
XZ Tauri	B	460	Taurus		M3.5			
Alpha Lupi (Uridim)		460 ± 10	Lupus		B1.5 III	2.30		One of the closest core-collapse supernova candidates to Earth.
Theta Carinae		460 ± 10	Carina		B0.5 Vp	2.76		Part of IC 2602 Open Cluster.
GY Andromedae		460 ± 10	Andromeda		B9 pe	6.36		
73 Leonis (n Leonis)	A	460 ± 10	Leo		K2 III	5.32		
73 Leonis (n Leonis)	B	460 ± 10	Leo		F6V			
Merope (23 Tauri)		460 ± 20	Taurus		B6IV(e)		4.18	Part of Pleiades Cluster (M45).
Sigma Arietis$		463 ± 9	Aries	02^{h} 51^{m} 29.586^{s} +15° 04′ 55.44″	B7V	5.52#	7.0519±0.134	
HAT-P-12 (Komondor)		463.0 ± 0.7			K5	12.84		Has one confirmed exoplanet (HAT-P-12b/Puli).
HAT-P-26 (Guahayona)		466 ± 1			K1V	11.76		
Omicron Aquarii		466 ± 9	Aquarius		B7 IVe	4.71		
2MASS J04442713+2512164		467 ± 4			M7.25e±0.25	17.65±0.38		Member of Taurus molecular cloud.
Nu Scorpii (Jabbah)	A	470	Scorpius		B3V	4.349 + 6.60 + 6.30		
Nu Scorpii (Jabbah)	B	470	Scorpius		B9III			
Nu Scorpii (Jabbah)	B	470	Scorpius		B9III			
Winnecke 4B (M40)		470 ± 1			G0 V	10.11		
Rho Scorpii (Iklil)		470 ± 10	Scorpius		B2 IV	3.86		
Epsilon Cassiopeiae (Segin)		470 ± 10	Cassiopeia		B3 V	3.37		
Gamma Pegasi (Algenib)		470 ± 30	Pegasus		B2 IV	+2.78 to 2.89		
Tau Scorpii (Paikauhale)		470 ± 40	Scorpius		B0.2 V	+2.82		
Kepler-68		470.7 ± 0.7			G1V	10.08		Has three confirmed and one unconfirmed exoplanets.
T Tauri		471 ± 4	Taurus		K0IV/Ve	9.3 - 13.5		
UScoCTIO 108	A	473 ± 6			M7	13.6		has a brown dwarf or an extrasolar planet.
UScoCTIO 108	B	473 ± 6			M9.5 III			has a brown dwarf or an extrasolar planet.
Mu² Scorpii (Pipirima)		474 ± 8		Scorpius	B2 IV	3.56		
WD 1145+017 (EPIC 201563164)		476 ± 6			DB	17.24±0.02		Has 1 Confirmed exoplanet (WD 1145+017 b).
Kappa Scorpii (Girtab)		480 ± 10	Scorpius		B1.5 III	2.41 - 2.42		
Lambda Tauri	A (Bibing)	480 ± 10	Taurus		B3 V	+3.37		
Lambda Tauri	B	480 ± 10	Taurus		A4 IV			
BL Crucis		480 ± 10	Crux		M4-5III	5.38		
48 Persei		480 ± 10			B3Ve	4.03		Member of Alpha Persei Cluster.
PP Carinae		480 ± 30	Carina		B4 Vne	3.22 - 3.55		Part of IC 2602 Open Cluster.
HD 206610 (Bosona)		482 ± 2			K0III	8.34		
Gamma Ursae Minoris (Pherkad)		487 ± 8	Ursa Minor		A2 III			
XO-2	S	489 ± 1			K0V	11.12±0.03		Has four exoplanets.
XO-2	N	490 ± 1			K0V	11.18±0.03		Has four exoplanets.
89 Aquarii (c³ Aquarii)	A	489.2	Aquarius		G3 II	+4.69		
89 Aquarii (c³ Aquarii)	B	489.2	Aquarius		A2 V			
HD 93194		490 ± 10			B3/5Vn			Part of IC 2602 Open Cluster.
Beta Canis Majoris (Mirzam)$		490 ± 20	Canis Major		B1 II-III	1.985#		
Omicron Velorum		490 ± 30	Vela		B3/5(V)	+3.60		Member of IC 2391 Cluster.
HD 93607		491 ± 5			B4V	4.87		Part of IC 2602 Open Cluster.
8 Leonis Minoris		492 ± 2	Leo Minor		M1 IIIab	5.37		
HD 108530		494			K2III			
GQ Lupi	A	495 ± 4		Lupus	K7V	11.40		Has one confirmed exoplanet (GQ Lupi b).
GQ Lupi	B	495 ± 4		Lupus	M4			Has one confirmed exoplanet (GQ Lupi b).
Kepler-411B		496 ± 4			M	12.55		Orbits a star with 5 planets
Alpha Apodis (Paradys)		498 ± 9	Apus		K3IIICN0.5	3.83		
R Coronae Australis	A	498.6	Corona Australis		B5IIIpe	+11.91	7.9872±0.4874	
R Coronae Australis	B	498.6	Corona Australis		M		7.9872±0.4874	
Kepler-411A		499.4 ± 0.6	Cygnus	19^{h} 10^{m} 25.35^{s} +49° 31′ 23.71″	K2V	12.55±0.01	6.5313±0.0080	Has five exoplanets.
System	Star or (sub-) brown dwarf	Distance (ly)	Constellation	Coordinates: RA, Dec (Ep J2000, Eq J2000)	Stellar class	Apparent magnitude (V)	Parallax (mas)	Notes and additional references

== See also ==
- List of star systems within 400–450 light-years
