= Beta Lupi =

Star in the constellation of Lupus

- Location of β Lupus (circled)

Observation data Epoch J2000 Equinox J2000
- Constellation: Lupus
- Right ascension: 14^{h} 58^{m} 31.92536^{s}
- Declination: −43° 08′ 02.2699″
- Apparent magnitude (V): 2.68

Characteristics
- Spectral type: B2 III
- U−B color index: −0.902
- B−V color index: −0.226
- Variable type: β Cep

Astrometry
Radial velocity (R_{v})	+0.1±1.0 km/s
Proper motion (μ)	RA: −35.78 mas/yr Dec.: −39.83 mas/yr
Parallax (π)	8.52±0.18 mas
Distance	383 ± 8 ly (117 ± 2 pc)
Absolute magnitude (M_{V})	−3.3

Details
Mass	8.8±0.2 M_{☉}
Radius	6.6 R_{☉}
Luminosity	10,000 L_{☉}
Surface gravity (log g)	3.76 cgs
Temperature	24,090 K
Metallicity [Fe/H]	−0.35±0.11 dex
Rotational velocity (v sin i)	92 km/s
Age	24.6±2.7 Myr

Other designations
- β Lup, CD−42°9853, FK5 552, HD 132058, HIP 73273, HR 5571, SAO 225335

Database references
SIMBAD	data

Beta Lupi (Latinized from β Lupi) is a star in the southern constellation of Lupus. It has an apparent visual magnitude of 2.7, making it readily visible to the naked eye. Based upon parallax measurements, this star is located at a distance of about 383 light-years (117 parsecs) from Earth.

== Properties ==
The stellar classification of B2 III indicates this is a giant star. The effective temperature of the star's outer envelope is 24,090 K, giving it the blue-white hue of a B-type star. With an age of around 25 million years, it is near the end of its hydrogen phase, where hydrogen is fused into the element helium, and transferring into a red supergiant star. At about 8.8 solar masses, it may have enough mass to end its life as a Type II supernova, but there is the possibility of Beta Lupi becoming a white dwarf.

This is a multi-period Beta Cephei variable with a dominant oscillation period of 0.232 days. It is a proper motion member of the Upper Centaurus–Lupus sub-group in the Scorpius–Centaurus OB association, the nearest such co-moving association of massive stars to the Sun. Beta Lupi has a high proper motion of more than 50 mas per year, suggesting a significant transverse velocity.

It is positioned about 1.3° SSW of the supernova remnant SN 1006.

== Name ==
In Chinese, 騎官 (Qí Guān), meaning Imperial Guards, refers to an asterism consisting of β Lupi, γ Lupi, δ Lupi, κ Centauri, λ Lupi, ε Lupi, μ Lup, π Lupi, ο Lupi and α Lupi. Consequently, the Chinese name for β Lupi itself is 騎官四 (Qí Guān sì, English: the Fourth Star of Imperial Guards.). From the French rendering of this Chinese name derives the traditional European name Ke Kwan or Kekouan (/ˈkɛkwɑːn/).

== See also ==
- Traditional Chinese star names#Lupus
