= Kappa Centauri =

Variable binary star system in the constellation Centaurus

κ Centauri
- Location of κ Centauri (circled)

Observation data Epoch J2000.0 Equinox ICRS
- Constellation: Centaurus
- κ Cen AB
- Right ascension: 14^{h} 59^{m} 09.6849^{s}
- Declination: −42° 06′ 15.107″
- Apparent magnitude (V): +3.14 (3.34 + 4.71)
- κ Cen C
- Right ascension: 14^{h} 59^{m} 10.0318^{s}
- Declination: −42° 06′ 14.602″
- Apparent magnitude (V): 11.5

Characteristics

κ Cen AB
- Evolutionary stage: main sequence
- Spectral type: B2V + B3V
- U−B color index: −0.805
- B−V color index: −0.204
- Variable type: Candidate β Cep

κ Cen C
- Evolutionary stage: main sequence
- Spectral type: K2V

Astrometry

κ Cen AB
Radial velocity (R_{v})	+8.0 km/s
Proper motion (μ)	RA: −17.62 mas/yr Dec.: −22.51 mas/yr
Parallax (π)	8.14±0.33 mas
Distance	400 ± 20 ly (123 ± 5 pc)
Absolute magnitude (M_{V})	−2.2

κ Cen C
Proper motion (μ)	RA: −18.769 mas/yr Dec.: −23.688 mas/yr
Parallax (π)	7.4667±0.0994 mas
Distance	437 ± 6 ly (134 ± 2 pc)

Orbit
Primary	κ Cen A
Name	κ Cen B
Period (P)	58.52±1.50 years
Semi-major axis (a)	0.287″±0.008″
Eccentricity (e)	0.304±0.009
Inclination (i)	90.9±0.5°
Longitude of the node (Ω)	156.1±0.5°
Periastron epoch (T)	2011.10±0.30
Argument of periastron (ω) (secondary)	215.1±2.0°

Details

κ Cen A
Mass	8.38±0.27 M_{☉}
Radius	4.4±0.7 R_{☉}
Luminosity	2,500 L_{☉}
Surface gravity (log g)	4.02±0.20 cgs
Temperature	20,900 K
Rotational velocity (v sin i)	10 km/s
Age	18.2±3.2 Myr

κ Cen B
Mass	4.41±0.36 M_{☉}
Temperature	18,800 K

κ Cen C
Mass	0.67 M_{☉}
Surface gravity (log g)	4.65 cgs
Temperature	4,830 K

Other designations
- κ Cen, CD−41°9342, FK5 553, HD 132200, HIP 73334, HR 5576, SAO 225344, WDS J14592-4206A

Database references
SIMBAD	data

Kappa Centauri is a triple star system in the southern constellation of Centaurus. Its name is a Bayer designation that is Latinized from κ Centauri, and abbreviated Kappa Cen or κ Cen. With an apparent visual magnitude of +3.14, it can be viewed with the naked eye on a dark night. Parallax measurements place it at an estimated distance of 400 light-years (120 parsecs) from Earth.

== Characteristics ==
Kappa Centauri consists of an outer visual pair consisting of the components AB and C, and an inner pair consisting of the components A and B. The inner pair is a spectroscopic binary system where the presence of an orbiting companion is revealed by shifts in the absorption lines caused by the Doppler effect. They take 58 years to complete an orbit, have a small eccentricity of 0.304, and are seen orbiting nearly edge-on.

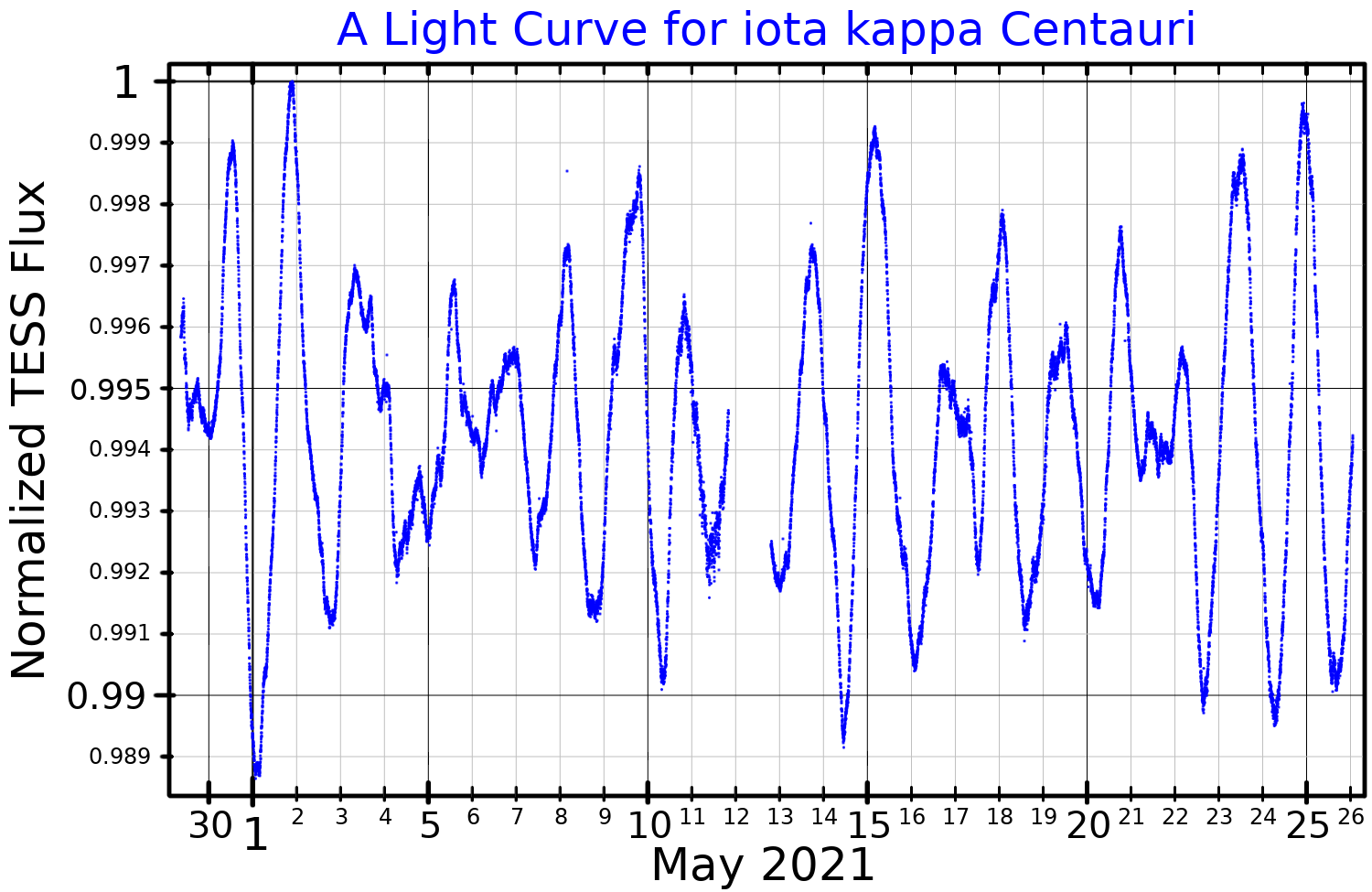
A light curve for Kappa Centauri, plotted from TESS data.

The primary, component A, has about 8.4 times the Sun's mass and four times the Sun's radius. It has a stellar classification of B2V, indicating that it is in the main sequence stage of its stellar evolution. An effective temperature of 20,900 K in the outer envelope is what gives it the blue-white hue of a B-type star. It is a candidate Beta Cephei variable that shows line-profile variations in its spectrum. However, the nature of the variability remains uncertain because of the binary nature of the system.

The secondary, component B, is also a B-type main-sequence star, of spectral class B3V. It has 4.4 times the Sun's mass and an effective temperature of 18,800 K.

The outer companion C is separated by 3.9" from the inner pair and has an estimated orbital period of 3,200 years. It is an K-type main-sequence star with a spectral type K2V. The star has 0.67 times the mass of the Sun and an effective temperature of 4,829 K.

This system is a proper motion member of the Upper Centaurus–Lupus sub-group in the Scorpius–Centaurus OB association, the nearest such co-moving association of massive stars to the Sun.

== In Chinese astronomy ==
In Chinese, 騎官 (Qí Guān), meaning Imperial Guards, refers to an asterism consisting of κ Centauri, γ Lupi, δ Lupi, β Lupi, λ Lupi, ε Lupi, μ Lup, π Lupi, ο Lupi and α Lupi. Consequently, the Chinese name for κ Centauri itself is 騎官三 (Qí Guān sān, English: the Third Star of Imperial Guards.). From this Chinese name, the name Ke Kwan has appeared.

== See also ==
- Traditional Chinese star names
