= Alpha Lupi =

Star in the constellation Lupus

- Location of α Lupi (circled)

Observation data Epoch J2000 Equinox ICRS
- Constellation: Lupus
- Right ascension: 14^{h} 41^{m} 55.75579^{s}
- Declination: –47° 23′ 17.5155″
- Apparent magnitude (V): 2.30 (2.29 - 2.34)

Characteristics
- Spectral type: B1.5 III
- U−B color index: −0.88
- B−V color index: −0.20
- Variable type: β Cep

Astrometry
| Radial velocity (R_{v}) | +5.4±0.6 km/s |
| Proper motion (μ) | RA: −20.94 mas/yr Dec.: −23.67 mas/yr |
| Parallax (π) | 7.02±0.17 mas |
| Distance | 460 ± 10 ly (142 ± 3 pc) |
| Absolute magnitude (M_{V}) | −4.3 |

Details

Primary
| Mass | 10.1±1.0 M_{☉} |
| Radius | 7.46 ± 0.17 (Note: Applying the Stefan–Boltzmann law with a nominal solar effective temperature of 5,772 K: $$\sqrt{\biggl(\frac{5,772}{24,550}\biggr)^4 \cdot 10^{4.26}} = 7.46\ R_\odot$$.) R_{☉} |
| Luminosity | 18,200+860 −820 L_{☉} |
| Surface gravity (log g) | 3.46 cgs |
| Temperature | 24,550 K |
| Metallicity [Fe/H] | 0.04 dex |
| Rotational velocity (v sin i) | 9.5 km/s |
| Age | 16–20 Myr |

Secondary
| Mass | 2.25 M_{☉} |

Other designations
- Uridim, α Lup, CD−46°9501, FK5 541, HD 129056, HIP 71860, HR 5469, SAO 225128

Database references
| SIMBAD | data |

Alpha Lupi (α Lupi, α Lup), also named Uridim, is a binary star, and the brightest star in the southern constellation of Lupus. According to the Bortle Dark-Sky Scale, its apparent visual magnitude of 2.3 makes it readily visible to the naked eye even from highly light-polluted locales. Based upon parallax measurements made during the Hipparcos mission, the star is around 460 light-years (140 parsecs) from the Solar System. It is one of the nearest supernova candidates.

== Visibility ==
Visible from the Southern Hemisphere for much of the year, it can also be viewed for a shorter season from the northern tropics and from parts of the northern subtropical latitudes.

== Nomenclature ==
α Lupi (Latinised to Alpha Lupi) is the star's Bayer designation.

In Chinese, Kekouan 騎官 (Qí Guān), meaning Imperial Guards, refers to an asterism consisting of α Lupi, γ Lupi, δ Lupi, κ Centauri, β Lupi, λ Lupi, ε Lupi, μ Lup, π Lupi, and ο Lupi. Consequently, the Chinese name for α Lupi itself is 騎官十 (Qí Guān shí, English: the Tenth Star of Imperial Guards.).

R. H. Allen described this star as having the Chinese name Yang Mun or Men (南門), meaning "the South Gate", in his work Star-Names and their Meanings. In Chinese astronomy, 南門 is located in Horn mansion and consisted of α and ε Centauri. It was referred to as Yang Mun, meaning "the south Gate". Allen also suggested that the Babylonian name for the star was "Kakkab Su-gub Gud-Elim" (Star Left Hand of the Horned Bull).

The Sumerian name for the constellation Lupus was UR.IDIM, later alternatively written Uridimmu in the Akkadian language. The IAU Working Group on Star Names approved the name Uridim for this star on 12 September 2024 and it is now so entered in the IAU Catalog of Star Names.

== Characteristics ==
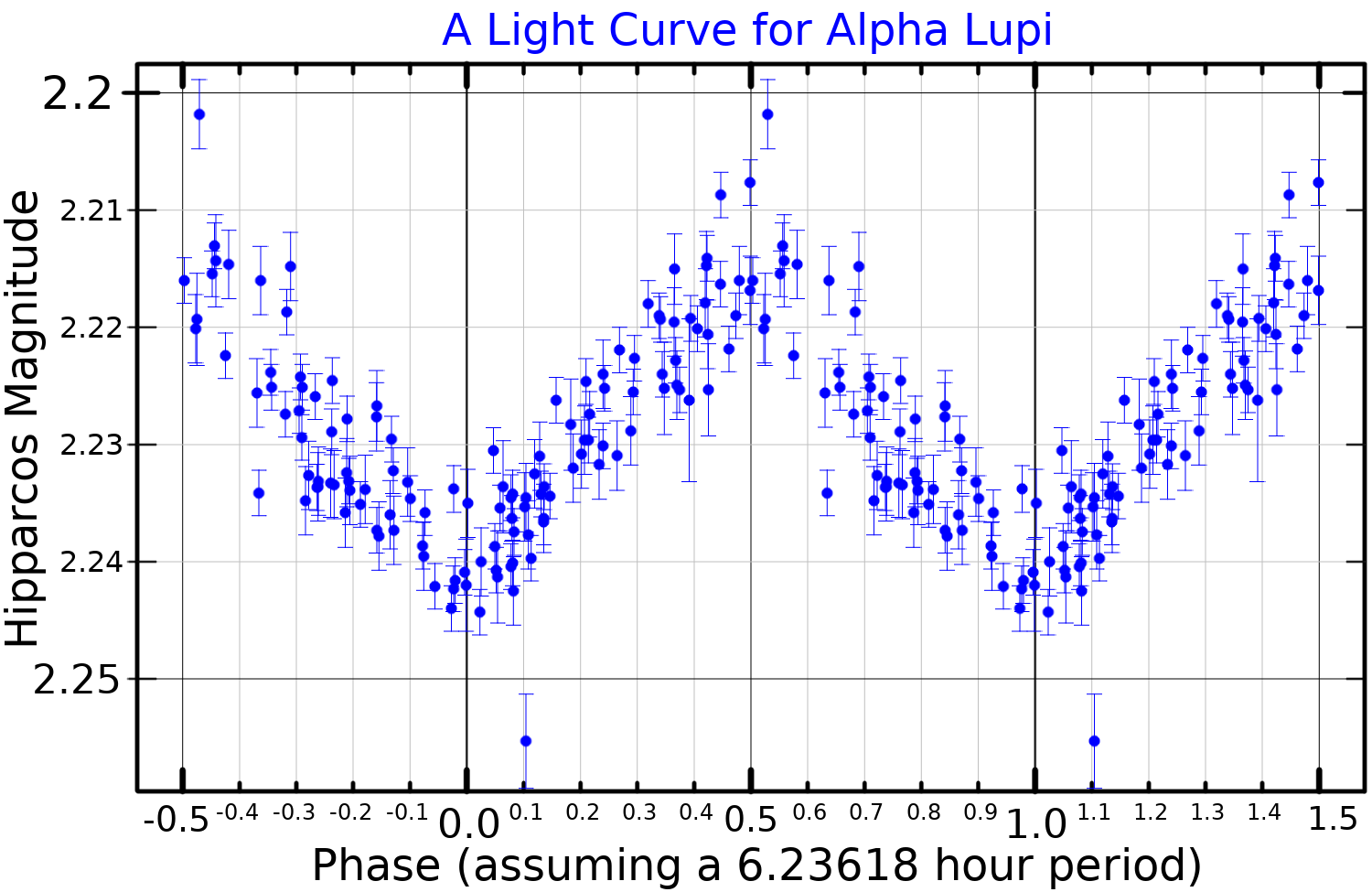
A light curve for Alpha Lupi, plotted from Hipparcos data

The primary star is a giant star with a stellar classification of B1.5 III. It has about ten times the mass of the Sun yet is radiating 18,000 times the Sun's luminosity. The outer atmosphere has an effective temperature of 24,550 K, which gives it the blue-white glow of a B-type star. In 1956 it was identified as a Beta Cephei variable by Bernard Pagel and colleagues, which means it undergoes periodic changes in luminosity because of pulsations in the atmosphere. The variability period is 0.29585 days, or just over 7 hours, 6 minutes. The magnitude varies by about 0.05 magnitudes, or about 5% of its brightness.

The secondary was reported in 2023 after an interferometric search. It was detected at a separation of 76 mas, corresponding to a projected separation of 12.7 au. It is 5.14 magnitudes fainter than the primary in the K-band and has a mass of 2.25 M_{☉}. The orbital period is expected to be close to a decade, short enough for orbital motion to be detectable. Radial velocity observations have found no evidence for variations induced by the companion, although its semi-amplitude is likely below the detection limits.

A 14th magnitude star situated 26" from Alpha Lupi is listed as a companion in double star catalogues.

Alpha Lupi is a proper motion member of the Upper Centaurus–Lupus sub-group in the Scorpius–Centaurus OB association, the nearest such co-moving association of massive stars to the Sun. This is a gravitationally unbound stellar association with an estimated age of 16–20 million years. The association is also the source of a bubble of hot gas that contains the Sun, known as the Local Bubble.
