= Omega Carinae =

Star in the constellation Carina

ω Carinae
- Location of ω Carinae (circled)

Observation data Epoch J2000 Equinox J2000
- Constellation: Carina
- Right ascension: 10^{h} 13^{m} 44.21739^{s}
- Declination: −70° 02′ 16.4563″
- Apparent magnitude (V): 3.29

Characteristics
- Spectral type: B8 IIIe
- U−B color index: −0.285
- B−V color index: −0.083

Astrometry
Radial velocity (R_{v})	+7.0 km/s
Proper motion (μ)	RA: −36.01 mas/yr Dec.: +7.09 mas/yr
Parallax (π)	9.54±0.09 mas
Distance	342 ± 3 ly (104.8 ± 1.0 pc)
Absolute magnitude (M_{V})	−1.81

Details
Mass	4.9 M_{☉}
Radius	7.20±0.14 R_{☉}
Luminosity	918 L_{☉}
Surface gravity (log g)	3.51 cgs
Temperature	11,630 K
Rotational velocity (v sin i)	240 km/s

Other designations
- ω Car, CD−69°1178, FK5 385, HD 89080, HIP 50099, HR 4037, SAO 250885

Database references
SIMBAD	data

Omega Carinae is a star in the constellation Carina. Its name is a Bayer designation that is Latinized from ω Carinae, and abbreviated Omega Car or ω Car. With a declination greater than 70 degrees south of the celestial equator, it is the most southerly of the bright stars of Carina (third-magnitude or brighter), and it is part of a southern asterism known as the Diamond Cross. This naked eye star has an apparent visual magnitude of 3.3 and is located at a distance of about 342 light-years (105 parsecs) from Earth.

== Properties ==
Omega Carinae has a stellar classification of B8 IIIe, which places it in the category of Be stars, that display emission lines of hydrogen their spectrum. Omega Carinae is a shell star, having a circumstellar disk of gas surrounding its equator. The luminosity class of III indicates it has evolved into a giant star, having exhausted the hydrogen at its core and left the main sequence. The effective temperature of 11,630 K in its outer envelope is what gives this star the blue-white hue that is characteristic of B-type stars.

This star is rotating rapidly with a projected rotational velocity of 240 km/s, which gives a lower limit to the star's azimuthal velocity along the equator. The critical equatorial velocity, at which the star would begin to break up, is 320 km s^{−1}. The star's axis of rotation is inclined by an estimated angle of 70.8° to the line of sight from the Earth.

In the next 7500 years, the south Celestial pole will pass close to this star (AD 5800) and then I Carinae.

== In culture ==
In Chinese, 南船 (Nán Chuán), meaning Southern Boat, refers to an asterism consisting of ω Carinae, V337 Carinae, PP Carinae, θ Carinae and β Carinae . Consequently, ω Carinae itself is known as 南船四 (Nán Chuán sì, English: the Fourth Star of Southern Boat.)
