= HD 161056 =

Star in the constellation Ophiuchus

- Location of HD 161056 (circled)

Observation data Epoch J2000.0 Equinox J2000.0
- Constellation: Ophiuchus
- Right ascension: 17^{h} 43^{m} 47.02216^{s}
- Declination: −07° 04′ 46.5943″
- Apparent magnitude (V): 6.32

Characteristics
- Spectral type: B1.5V, B3II/III, or B3Vn
- U−B color index: −0.42
- B−V color index: 0.36
- J−H color index: 0.072
- J−K color index: 0.101

Astrometry
Radial velocity (R_{v})	−26.0±4.3 km/s
Proper motion (μ)	RA: −4.629 mas/yr Dec.: −10.512 mas/yr
Parallax (π)	2.4404±0.0432 mas
Distance	1,340 ± 20 ly (410 ± 7 pc)
Absolute magnitude (M_{V})	−1.23

Details
Mass	12.5 M_{☉}
Radius	11.7 R_{☉}
Luminosity	14,454 L_{☉}
Surface gravity (log g)	3.26 cgs
Temperature	26,977 K
Metallicity [Fe/H]	−0.01 dex
Rotational velocity (v sin i)	234 km/s
Age	522 Myr

Other designations
- BD−07°4487, GC 24051, HIP 86768, HR 6601, SAO 141832, PPM 200979, TIC 296910097, TYC 5093-438-1, 2MASS J17434702-0704465, Gaia DR3 4168881422863453568

Database references
SIMBAD	data

HD 161056 (HIP 86768, HR 6601) is a bluish-white hued star in the equatorial constellation of Ophiuchus. It has an apparent magnitude of 6.32, placing it near the limit for naked eye visibility under dark skies. The object is located approximately 1,340 light-years (410 parsecs) distant according to Gaia DR3 parallax measurements, but it is moving closer at a heliocentric radial velocity of −26.0 km/s.

It is a luminous early B-type star, but its spectral type varies from publication to publication, most often between B1.5V, implying a hot main-sequence star, and B3II/III, indicative of a slightly cooler blue giant. It has a mass of 12.5 M_{☉} and a radius of 11.7 R_{☉}.

In Chinese astronomy, the star was given the name Shìlóuliù (Chinese: 市樓六), meaning it was the sixth star of the asterism Shìlóu (市樓, "Municipal Office") in the Heavenly Market enclosure.

== Polarimetry ==
In 1985, the star was suggested as a standard for polarimetric observations via the Hubble Space Telescope, since the star's large distance from Earth produces a large interstellar polarization and its high luminosity makes it easily visible at such distances. In 1988, however, it was found that the star was slightly variable in polarization, (Note: The same authors backed the star's status down to "possibly variable" in a 2007 study.) and thus unsuitable as a standard star.

Nevertheless, Hubble observed the star's ultraviolet interstellar polarization, thanks to it having been well-researched in the visible spectrum, presenting results consistent with Serkowski's law—an empirical formula regarding the dependency of interstellar polarization on wavelength. The extensive collected polarization spectrum showed a close match to what would be expected from an interstellar dust composition of pure amorphous forsterite.

== Spectroscopy ==
In addition to polarimetry, spectroscopic observations have also been conducted on HD 161056 to provide insight into the interstellar medium. The ESO Diffuse Interstellar Bands Large Exploration Survey (EDIBLES) detected signatures of diatomic carbon and tricarbon molecules in interstellar clouds surrounding the star.

Near-infrared spectroscopy has revealed signs of weak stellar emission lines of singly ionized magnesium and neutral helium (Mg II and He I in spectroscopic notation).

== Runaway star ==
HD 161056 is a runaway star and a candidate for producing a bow shock observable in the infrared. Such stars commonly originate in multiple star systems, from which they were ejected due to gravitational interactions or supernovae of their companions, and indeed it is possible that the star could have been in a binary system with the pulsar PSR B1929+10 about 1.1 million years ago, when it was located in the vicinity of IC 4665. However, Zeta Ophiuchi is considered more likely to have been its binary companion, in which scenario the pair possibly split up around 900,000 years ago.

== See also ==
- Ophiuchus in Chinese astronomy
- List of Chinese star names
