= Beta Carinae =

Star in the constellation Carina

β Carinae
- Location of β Carinae (circled)

Observation data Epoch J2000 Equinox ICRS
- Constellation: Carina
- Pronunciation: /ˌmaɪəˈplæsɪdəs/
- Right ascension: 09^{h} 13^{m} 11.97746^{s}
- Declination: −69° 43′ 01.9473″
- Apparent magnitude (V): 1.69

Characteristics
- Spectral type: A1III
- U−B color index: +0.03
- B−V color index: +0.00

Astrometry
Radial velocity (R_{v})	−5.2 km/s
Proper motion (μ)	RA: −156.47 mas/yr Dec.: +108.95 mas/yr
Parallax (π)	28.82±0.11 mas
Distance	113.2 ± 0.4 ly (34.7 ± 0.1 pc)
Absolute magnitude (M_{V})	−1.03

Details
Mass	3.88 M_{☉}
Radius	5.82 R_{☉}
Luminosity	223 L_{☉}
Surface gravity (log g)	3.50 cgs
Temperature	9,150±240 K
Metallicity [Fe/H]	−0.36 dex
Rotational velocity (v sin i)	145.7±2.2 km/s
Age	260 Myr

Other designations
- Miaplacidus, β Car, CD−69 600, FK5 348, GJ 339.2, GJ 9292, HD 80007, HIP 45238, HR 3685, SAO 250495

Database references
SIMBAD	data

Beta Carinae is the second-brightest star in the southern constellation of Carina. It has the official name Miaplacidus; Beta Carinae is the star's Bayer designation, which is Latinised from β Carinae and abbreviated Beta Car or β Car. With apparent magnitude of 1.69, it is one of the brightest stars in the night sky. It is the brightest star in the southern asterism known as the Diamond Cross, marking the southwestern end of the asterism. It lies near the planetary nebula IC 2448. Parallax measurements place it at a distance of 113.2 light-years (34.7 parsecs) from the Sun.

== Nomenclature ==
β Carinae (Latinised to Beta Carinae) is the star's Bayer designation. It was also designated as the alpha (α) star of Edmond Halley's now-obsolete constellation Robur Carolinum.

The star's historical name Miaplacidus made its debut on star maps in 1856 when the star atlas Geography of the Heavens, composed by Elijah Hinsdale Burritt, was published. The meaning and linguistic origin of the name is uncertain; placidus is from Latin for 'placid', while William Higgins, a 19th-century scholar on star names, surmised that the first part of the name is from Arabic مياه miyāh for 'waters'. The IAU Working Group on Star Names first bulletin of July 2016 included a table of the first two batches of names approved by the WGSN; which included Miaplacidus for this star.

In Chinese, 南船 (Nán Chuán), meaning Southern Boat, refers to an asterism consisting of β Carinae, V337 Carinae, PP Carinae, θ Carinae and ω Carinae. Consequently, β Carinae itself is known as 南船五 (Nán Chuán wǔ, English: the Fifth Star of Southern Boat).

== Physical properties ==
The stellar classification of A1 III mean that Miaplacidus is an evolved giant star that has exhausted the hydrogen at its core and has expanded. It has an estimated age of 260 million years. This star does not show an excess emission of infrared radiation that might otherwise suggest the presence of a debris disk. It has about 3.8 times the Sun's mass and has expanded to almost six times the radius of the Sun. Presently it is radiating 223 times as much luminosity as the Sun from its outer envelope at an effective temperature of 9,150 K. Despite its enlarged girth, this star still shows a rapid rotation rate, with a projected rotational velocity of 146 km/s.
