= HY Velorum =

Star in the constellation Vela

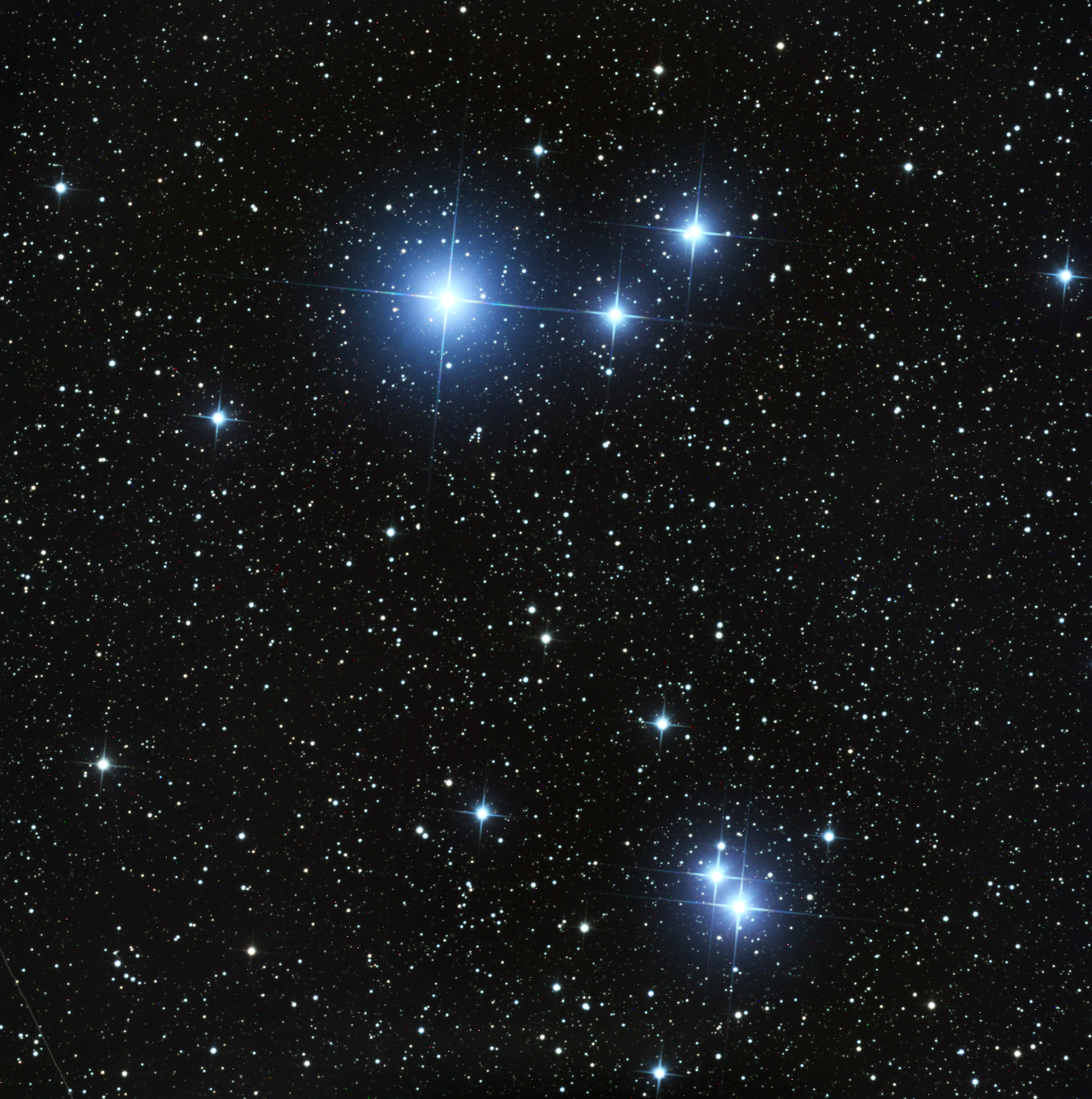
- Location of HY Velorum in IC 2391 (circled in red; north is to the left)

Observation data Epoch J2000 Equinox J2000
- Constellation: Vela
- Right ascension: 08^{h} 42^{m} 25.38667^{s}
- Declination: −53° 06′ 50.3324″
- Apparent magnitude (V): 4.81 - 4.86

Characteristics
- Spectral type: B3 IV
- B−V color index: −0.173±0.007
- Variable type: SPB

Astrometry
Radial velocity (R_{v})	+15.6±0.2 km/s
Proper motion (μ)	RA: −24.83 mas/yr Dec.: +23.21 mas/yr
Parallax (π)	7.1141±0.2302 mas
Distance	460 ± 10 ly (141 ± 5 pc)
Absolute magnitude (M_{V})	−1.25

Orbit
Period (P)	8.378±0.001 d
Eccentricity (e)	0.24±0.04
Periastron epoch (T)	2450741.3 ± 0.2 HJD
Argument of periastron (ω) (secondary)	93±9°
Semi-amplitude (K_{1}) (primary)	8.0±0.3 km/s

Details

HY Vel Aa
Mass	5.4 M_{☉}
Luminosity	830+927 −743 L_{☉}
Surface gravity (log g)	4.07 cgs
Temperature	16,865+235 −231 K
Metallicity [Fe/H]	0.03±0.02 dex
Rotational velocity (v sin i)	45 km/s
Age	179 Myr

Other designations
- HY Vel, CPD−52°1607, HD 74560, HIP 42726, HR 3467, SAO 236205, WDS J08424-5307A

Database references
SIMBAD	data

HY Velorum is a binary star system in the southern constellation of Vela. It is a dim star but visible to the naked eye with an apparent visual magnitude of 4.83. The distance to this system, as estimated from its annual parallax shift of 7.1 mas, is 460 light years. HY Vel most likely forms a gravitationally bound pair with the magnitude 5.45 binary system KT Vel (HD 74535); both are members of the IC 2391 open cluster. As of 1998, HY Vel and KT Vel had an angular separation of 76.1″ along a position angle of 311°.

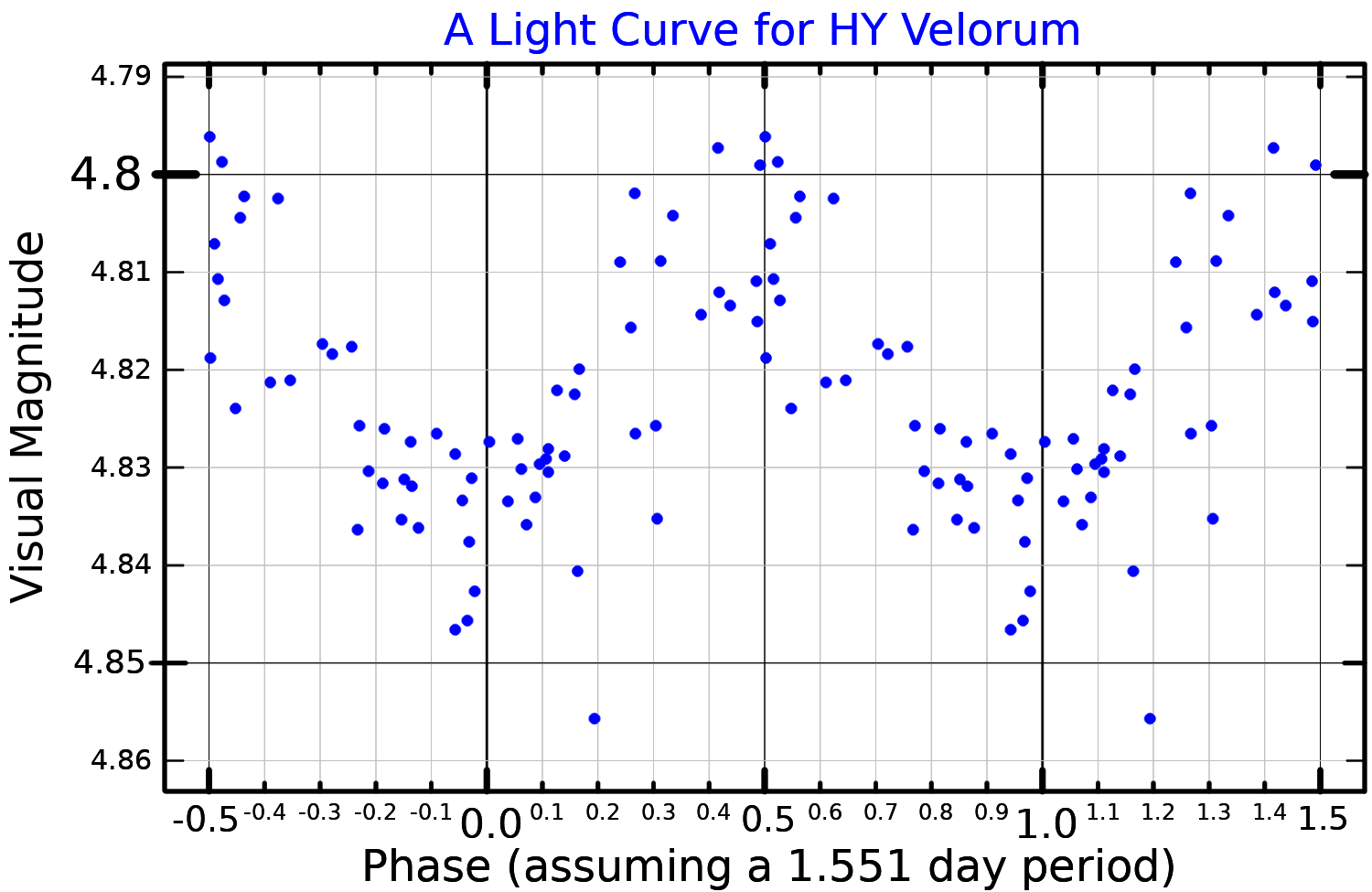
A visual band light curve for HY Velorum, adapted from Waelkens and Rufener (1985)

This is a single-lined spectroscopic binary system with an orbital period of 8.4 days and an eccentricity of 0.24. The visible component has an a sin i value of 0.006 AU, where a is the semimajor axis and i is the (unknown) orbital inclination to the line of sight.

In 1979, Shyam M. Jakate announced the discovery that the star's brightness varies. It was given its variable star designation, HY Velorum, in 1981. The primary, which is the variable star, is a slowly pulsating B-type star having at least three pulsational modes, with the dominant mode showing a frequency of 0.64472 cycles per day, corresponding to the catalogued period of 1.55106 days. It has a stellar classification of B3 IV, matching a B-type subgiant star.
