= IC 2602 =

Open cluster in the constellation Carina

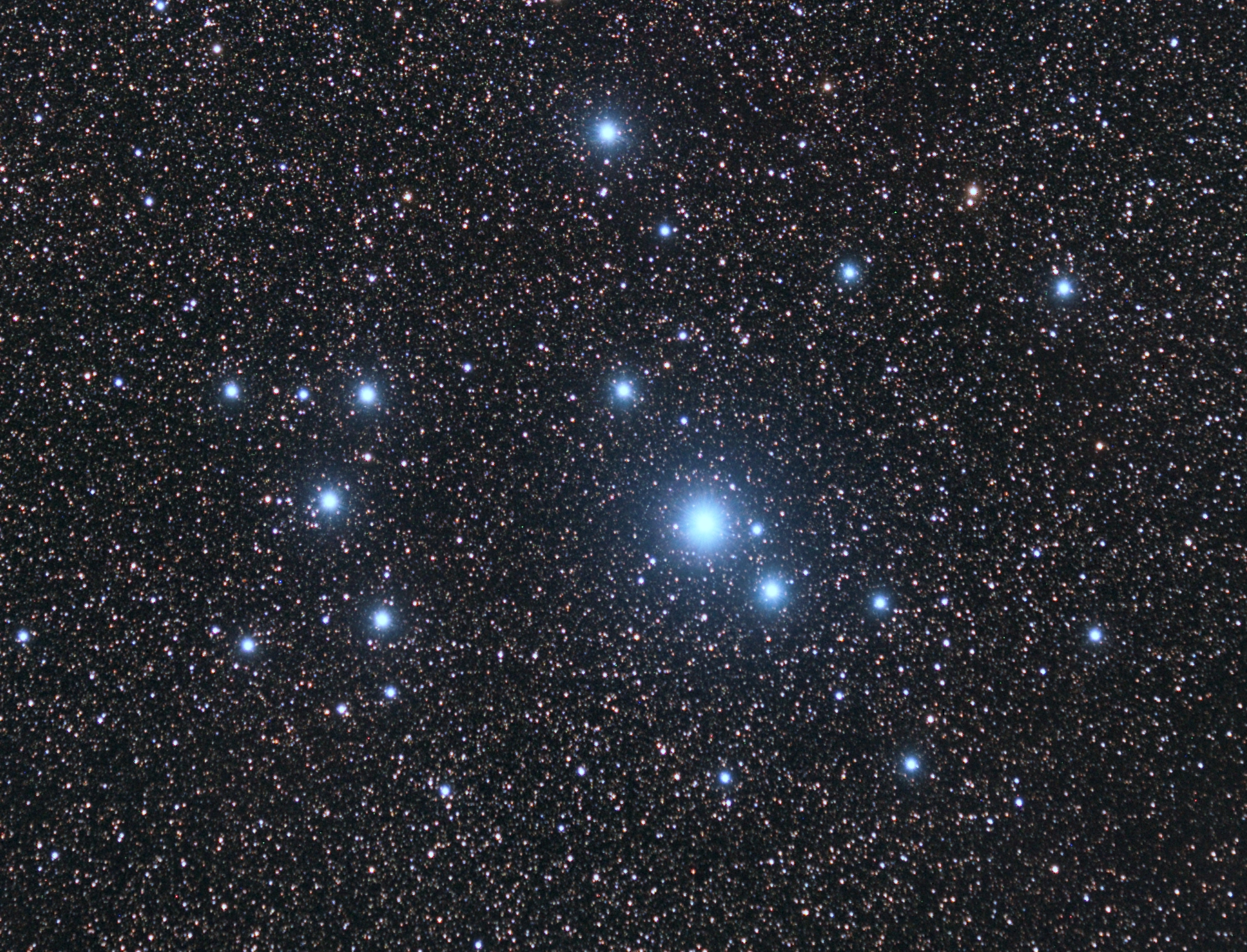

Observation data (J2000 epoch)
- Right ascension: 10^{h} 42^{m} 57.5^{s}
- Declination: −64° 23′ 39″
- Distance: 486 ly (149 pc)
- Apparent magnitude (V): 1.9
- Apparent dimensions (V): 50′ × 50′

Physical characteristics
- Estimated age: 13.7 Myr
- Other designations: Theta Carinae Cluster, Caldwell 102, Cr 229, Mel 102, VDBH 103

Associations
- Constellation: Carina

IC 2602 (also known as the Southern Pleiades, Theta Carinae Cluster, or Caldwell 102) is an open cluster in the constellation Carina. Discovered by Abbe Lacaille in 1751 from South Africa, the cluster is easily visible to the unaided eye, and is one of the nearest star clusters, centred about 149 parsecs (486 light-years) away from Earth.

== Description ==
IC 2602 has a total apparent magnitude of 1.9, and contains about 75 stars. It is the third-brightest open cluster in the sky, following the Hyades and the Pleiades. Its apparent diameter is about 50 arcminutes.

IC 2602 is likely about the same age as the open cluster IC 2391, which has a lithium depletion boundary age of 50 million years old, though the age estimated from its Hertzsprung-Russell diagram is about 13.7 million years. IC 2602 is thought to form part of the Lower Scorpius–Centaurus association.

== Components ==
Theta Carinae is the brightest star within the open cluster, with the apparent visual magnitude of +2.74. Theta Carinae is part of the asterism known as the Diamond Cross, which is often mistaken for the Southern Cross asterism in the constellation of Crux.

p Carinae (PP Carinae) is another third-magnitude star known to be a member of IC 2602, although it lies well outside the main visible grouping of stars. p Carinae exhibits a variable apparent magnitude ranging from 3.22 to 3.55.

All other members the cluster are of the fifth magnitude and fainter, but several are naked-eye objects, including HR 4196 (V518 Car), HR 4204, HD 93194, HR 4219, HR 4220, HR 4222, HD 92536, HD 93738, and V364 Carinae.

An exoplanet has been found orbiting the star TOI-837 in this cluster.

IC 2602 brightest stars
Designation	Apparent magnitude	Stellar classification	Distance (pc)
Theta Carinae	2.735	B0Vp	142
p Carinae (PP Carinae)	3.247	B4Vne	104.645
HR 4204	5.719	B3IV/V	309.598
HR 4219	5.297	B6Vnn	156.674
HR 4222	4.807	B4V	154.007
HD 92536	6.313	B8V	156.823
HD 93194	4.777	B3/5Vn	169.146
HD 93738	8.571	B9.5V	417.168
V364 Carinae	5.465	ApSi	160.013
V518 Carinae	4.758	B3V	140.634

== History ==
IC 2602 was first discovered by French astronomer and abbot Nicolas-Louis de Lacaille on March 3, 1751 while in Cape of Good Hope, South Africa. In Lacaille's initial discovery, he classified Theta Carinae (referred as "Theta Navis", or alternatively "Theta Argus") as a third magnitude star, whilst citing the cluster's resemblance to the northern Pleiades.

== Observation ==
Positioned at a declination of -64º on the night sky, IC 2602 is most clearly visible from the southern hemisphere, and appears circumpolar from southern subtropics and temperate climates; the cluster is observable from a limited selection of north hemispherical regions, mainly tropical areas. (Note: IC 2602 is located at a declination of −64°, which equates to an angular distance of 26º from the south celestial pole.) IC 2602 is identifiable a few degrees south of the southern Milky Way, surrounded by various fifth and sixth magnitude stars. To the unaided eye, several faint stars are distinguishable to the east of the blue Theta Carinae.
