= IC 2391 =

Open star cluster in the constellation Vela

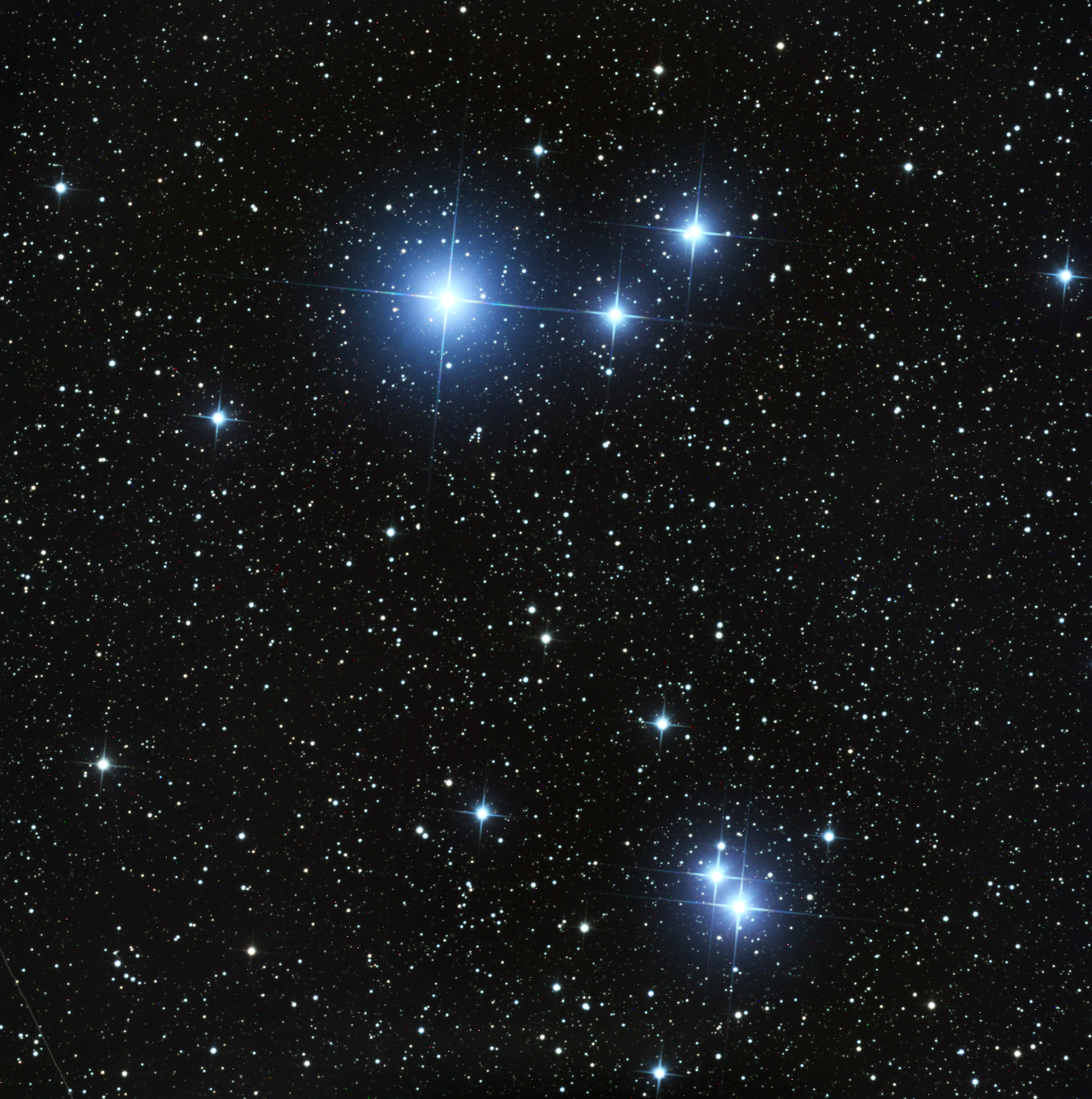
- A close image of IC 2391 (north is to the left). Credits: iTelescope.net (T59)

Observation data (J2000.0 epoch)
- Right ascension: 08^{h} 40.6^{m}
- Declination: −53° 02′
- Distance: 574 ly (176 pc)
- Apparent magnitude (V): 2.5
- Apparent dimensions (V): 50′

Physical characteristics
- Other designations: Caldwell 85, Cr 191, C 0838-528, Lac II 5

Associations
- Constellation: Vela

IC 2391 (also known as the Omicron Velorum Cluster or Caldwell 85) is an open cluster in the constellation Vela consisting of hot, young, blueish stars, some of which are binaries and one of which is a quadruple. Persian astronomer Abd al-Rahman al-Sufi first described it as "a nebulous star" in c. 964. It was re-found by Abbe Lacaille and cataloged as Lac II 5.

== Description ==
IC 2391 is centred about 490 light-years away from Earth and can be seen with the naked eye. It contains about 30 stars with a total visual magnitude of 2.5, spread out across 50 arcminutes.

== Member stars ==
These are some of the prominent members of IC 2391:

Name	Apparent magnitude (V)	Spectral type	Distance (LY)
HD 74195 (ο Velorum)	3.63 varies	B3/5(V)	496±30.5
HD 74560 (HY Velorum) sp. binary	4.815	B3IV	490.4±6.9
HD 74146 (NZ Velorum) sp. binary	5.19	B5IV	497.3±7.5
HD 74071 (HW Velorum)	5.44	B5V	519.9±7.5
HD 74196 cepheid variable	5.61	B9/A0	502±4.1
HD 74535 (KT Velorum) alpha2 CVn variable	5.47	B9III(pSi)	421±17.5
HD 75466	6.27	B8V	479±2.8
HD 73952	6.43	B8V	483±5.8
HD 74438, youngest known quadruple star.	7.58	A2mA5-A8	472±5.2

The stars' era of formation is similar to open cluster IC 2602 in neighbouring Carina, and has a lithium depletion boundary age of about 50 million years. The latter group averages about the same distance, placed at about 485 light years away.

== Argus Association ==
The components formed at about the same time as a nearer group, known as the "Argus Association" which one motion model suggests began in their own nebula cloud. These are in a similar direction, roughly the Vela constellation, within the local galactic arm. The supposed association may chiefly comprise:

Name	Constellation	Distance	Radial velocity
Epsilon Pavonis	Pavo	105	−6.7
HD 88955	Vela	100	+7.4
HD 61005	Puppis	119	+22
