= IC 2448 =

Planetary nebula in the constellation Carina

Emission nebula
- Planetary nebula
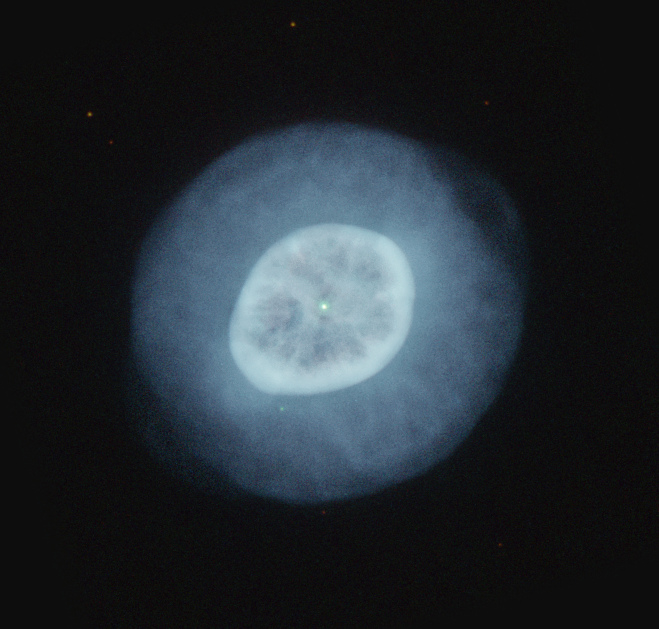

Observation data: J2000 epoch
- Right ascension: 09^{h} 07^{m} 06.3187^{s}
- Declination: −69° 56′ 30.690″
- Distance: 11000 ly (3500 (Note: From parallax, 0.2883 ± 0.0454 mas) pc)
- Apparent magnitude (V): 11.10
- Constellation: Carina
- Designations: Hen 2-19

IC 2448 is an elliptical planetary nebula in the constellation of Carina. It was discovered in 1898 by Williamina Fleming. It lies near the bright star Beta Carinae. The central star of the planetary nebula is an O-type star with a spectral type of O(H)3 III-V. An analysis of Gaia data suggests that it is a binary system.
