= HD 74438 =

Quadruple star system in the constellation Ursa Major

Observation data Epoch J2000 Equinox ICRS
- Constellation: Vela
- Right ascension: 08^{h} 41^{m} 46.5806^{s}
- Declination: −52° 03′ 44.996″
- Apparent magnitude (V): +7.59 (8.2/8.2/9.4/9.4)

Characteristics
- Spectral type: A2mA5-A8

Astrometry
Proper motion (μ)	RA: −17.745 mas/yr Dec.: +17.056 mas/yr
Parallax (π)	6.9075±0.0755 mas
Distance	472 ± 5 ly (145 ± 2 pc)
Absolute magnitude (M_{V})	+3.23

Orbit
Primary	AB
Name	CD
Period (P)	2,074.2±3.5 days
Semi-major axis (a)	5.54±0.04 au
Eccentricity (e)	0.458±0.015
Inclination (i)	73.2 or 106.8°
Semi-amplitude (K_{1}) (primary)	12.8±0.3 km/s
Semi-amplitude (K_{2}) (secondary)	18.5±0.4 km/s

Orbit
Primary	A
Name	B
Period (P)	20.5729±0.0003 days
Semi-major axis (a)	0.215±0.002 au
Eccentricity (e)	0.3692±0.0001
Inclination (i)	52.5 or 127.5°
Semi-amplitude (K_{1}) (primary)	45.81±0.09 km/s
Semi-amplitude (K_{2}) (secondary)	50.77±0.09 km/s

Orbit
Primary	C
Name	D
Period (P)	4.4243±0.0001 days
Semi-major axis (a)	0.0681±0.001 au
Eccentricity (e)	0.1535±0.0003
Inclination (i)	84.0 or 96.0°
Semi-amplitude (K_{1}) (primary)	45.81±0.09 km/s
Semi-amplitude (K_{2}) (secondary)	50.77±0.09 km/s

Details

A
Mass	1.70±0.06 M_{☉}
Radius	1.46±0.15 R_{☉}
Luminosity	8.87±1.40 L_{☉}
Temperature	8,250±250 K

B
Mass	1.54±0.06 M_{☉}
Radius	1.42±0.15 R_{☉}
Luminosity	5.72±0.95 L_{☉}
Temperature	7,500±250 K

C
Mass	0.96±0.14 M_{☉}
Radius	0.84±0.36 R_{☉}
Luminosity	0.64±0.51 L_{☉}
Temperature	5,625±410 K

D
Mass	0.87±0.14 M_{☉}
Radius	0.80±0.29 R_{☉}
Luminosity	0.48±0.32 L_{☉}
Temperature	5,375±410 K

Other designations
- HD 74438, CD−52°2497, SAO 236190

Database references
SIMBAD	data

HD 74438 is a spectroscopic quadruple stellar system composed of a pair of double star systems approximately 425 light years from Earth, located in the open cluster IC 2391. With an estimated age of 43+15
−7 million years, HD 74438 is the youngest quadruple star system known. The outer orbital period of the system, estimated at around 5.7 years, is also among the shortest of quadruple systems.

The HD 74438 system was confirmed to be a gravitationally bound quadruple system in 2017 from data collected in the Gaia-ESO Survey. In a paper published in 2022, HD 74438 was identified as a possible progenitor of a sub-Chandrasekhar Type Ia supernova.
