= HD 61005 =

Star in the constellation Puppis

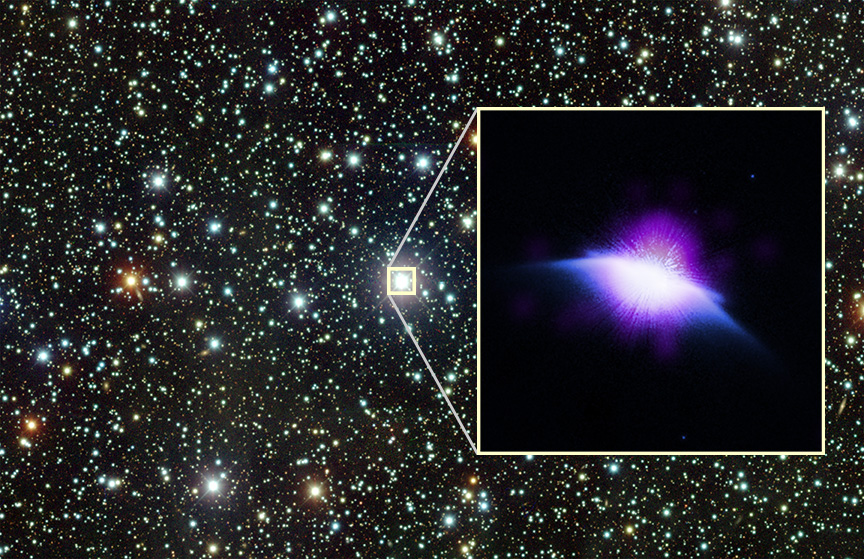
- HD 61005 imaged by Chandra X-ray Observatory

Observation data Epoch J2000 Equinox ICRS
- Constellation: Puppis
- Right ascension: 07^{h} 35^{m} 47.46236^{s}
- Declination: −32° 12′ 14.0451″
- Apparent magnitude (V): 8.22±0.01

Characteristics
- Evolutionary stage: main sequence
- Spectral type: G8 Vk
- B−V color index: +0.73
- R−I color index: +0.38

Astrometry
Radial velocity (R_{v})	22.64±0.04 km/s
Proper motion (μ)	RA: −55.050 mas/yr Dec.: +74.319 mas/yr
Parallax (π)	27.4344±0.0155 mas
Distance	118.89 ± 0.07 ly (36.45 ± 0.02 pc)
Absolute magnitude (M_{V})	+5.49

Details
Mass	0.96±0.01 M_{☉}
Radius	0.81 R_{☉}
Luminosity	0.61 L_{☉}
Surface gravity (log g)	4.54±0.07 cgs
Temperature	5,598 K
Metallicity [Fe/H]	+0.01±0.04 dex
Rotational velocity (v sin i)	8.2 km/s
Age	100±50 Myr

Other designations
- Moth, CD−31°4778, CPD−31°1685, HD 61005, HIP 36948, SAO 198166, TYC 7109-2638-1

Database references
SIMBAD	data

HD 61005 (also known as the Moth) is a young star located in the southern constellation Puppis. It has an apparent magnitude of 8.22, making it readily visible in binoculars, but not to the naked eye. The object is located relatively close at a distance of 119 light years (36.4 pc) based on Gaia DR3 parallax measurements but is receding with a heliocentric radial velocity of 22.6 km/s.

This star system has been referred to as "the Moth" in reference to the shape of its debris disk. The name Moth was officially approved by the IAU Working Group on Star Names on 13 June 2026.

== Characteristics ==
HD 61005 has a stellar classification of G8 Vk, indicating that it is a yellow dwarf with strong interstellar absorption features in its spectrum. However, it is younger than the Sun at an age of 100 +/- 50 million years, meaning that it is just settling onto the normal hydrogen-burning part of the stellar main sequence. The star retains a detectable debris disk - a disk of dust created from collisions of planetesimals in a belt analogous to the Solar System's Kuiper belt. HD 61005 is located at the edge of the Local Bubble, a region with a low concentration of interstellar dust and hot gas surrounding the Sun. It is suspected to be a member of the Argus association.

It has 96% the mass of the Sun and 81% of its solar radius. It radiates 61% of the luminosity of the Sun from its photosphere at an effective temperature of 5,598 K, giving it a yellow hue. HD 61005 has a solar metallicity — meaning it closely matches the Sun’s abundances of the chemical elements heavier than helium; it spins modestly with a projected rotational velocity of 8.2 km/s.

== Debris disk ==
In 2007, astronomer Dean C. Hines and colleagues announced the discovery of a debris disk around HD 61005. The disk has an unusual shape, which in 2009 was shown separately by astronomers John H. Debes and Holly L. Maness is likely due to the headwind created as the system flies at 20–30 km/sec through a dense region of the interstellar medium (ISM). The outer disc morphology, consisting of fine (~1 um dust grains), resembles the wings of a moth, inspiring the system's name. The researchers also suggested that the passage through dense galactic areas can affect the atmosphere of planets that form, although their data analysis did not find evidence for any planets in the system.

In 2018, astronomer Meredith A. MacGregor used the ALMA observatory to image the large particles in the system’s debris disk, showing that the heavy dust is confined to an ecliptic plane that overlaps the heart of the Moth and extends out to the roots of its wings. This ecliptic plane is seen almost perfectly edge-on from the Earth, which may allow us to see the Moth's wings extending in the opposite direction from the instreaming ISM.

In 2021, a group of astronomers led by Carey M. Lisse of the Johns Hopkins Applied Physics Laboratory observed the system with the high spatial resolution spectrophotometric ACIS-S camera onboard the Chandra X-ray Observatory . They were motivated to look for evidence of the same charge exchange x-ray emission that occurs between instreaming neutral ISM material and the solar wind (SW) in our heliosphere by the 2007 – 2009 reports of the strong interaction between a local instreaming dense ISM and the HD 61005 system. Since young stars spin much faster and produce much stronger (~70x stronger than the Sun’s) and hotter (~7 times hotter than the Sun’s) stellar winds, they surmised that the collision of the much denser outflowing stellar wind with the much denser (~1000 times the wind experienced by the solar system) inflowing ISM wind would make up for the 36.4 pc distance to the star system. In 2025 they announced that they had imaged a stellar-wind bubble of x-ray emitting material surrounding the system which produced the characteristic x-ray spectral signature of charge exchange seen in our own solar system, the first time this has ever been done from the outside for a G-star like the Sun.

== Gallery ==
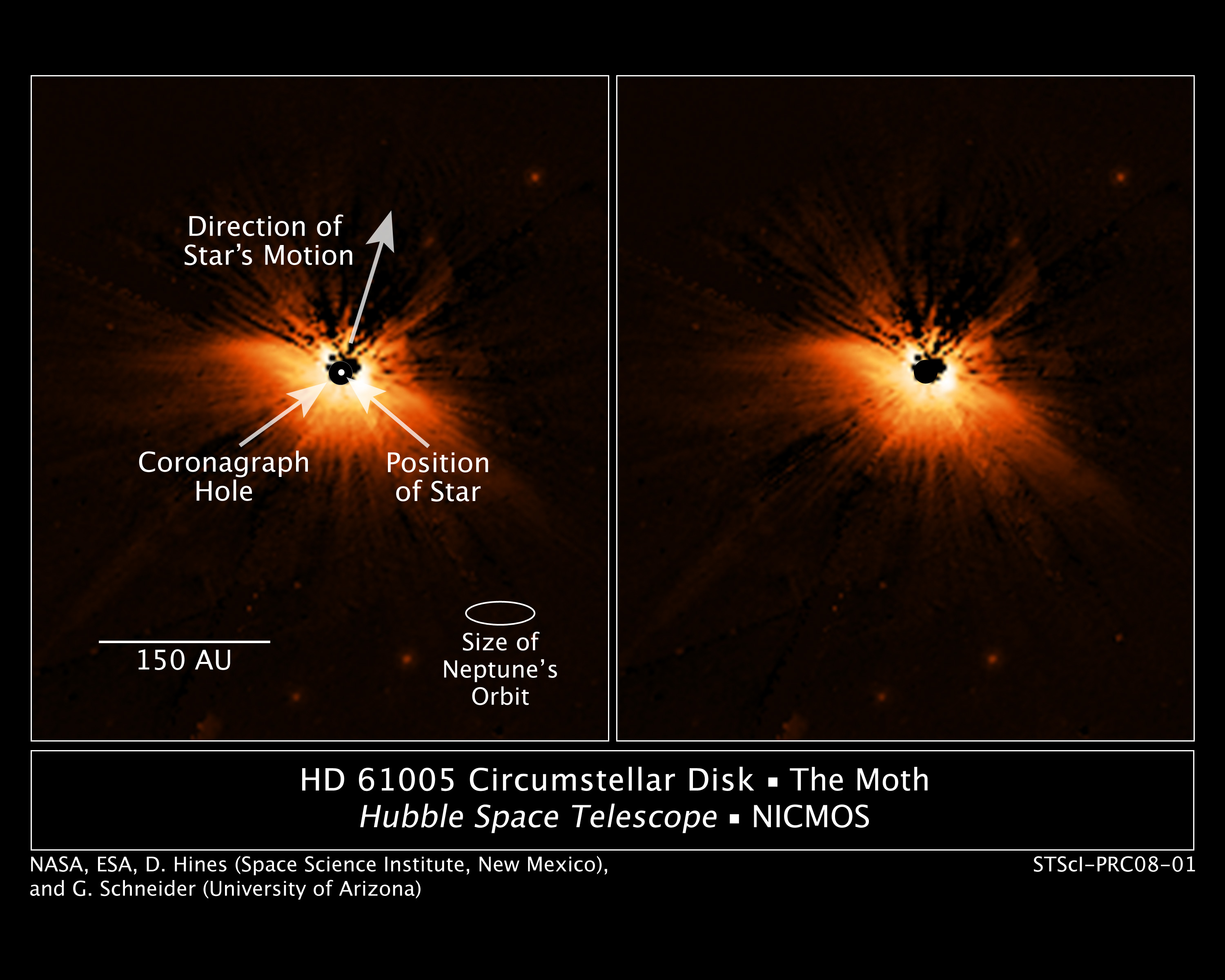
Annoted Hubble Space Telescope photo of HD 61005

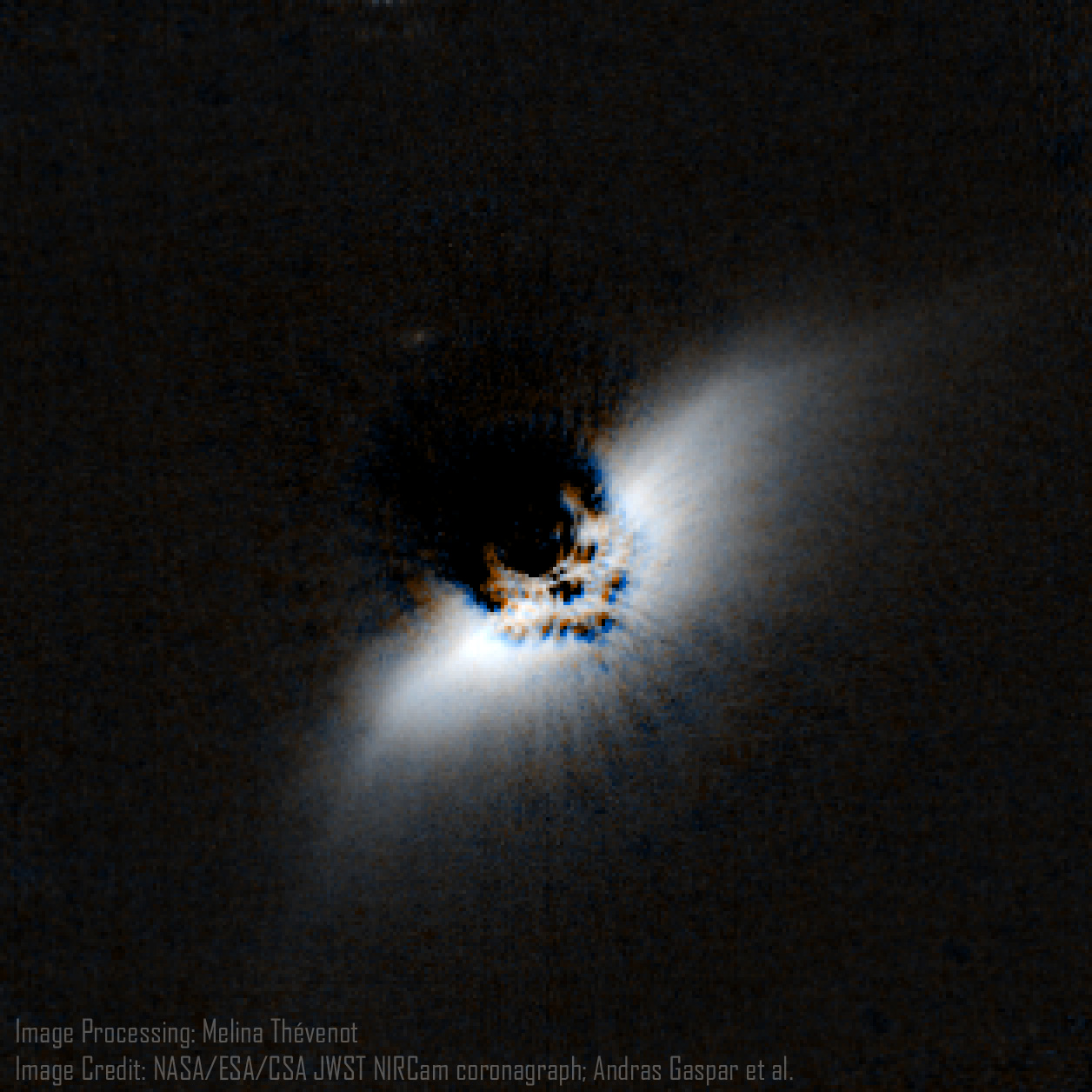
JWST NIRCam image of the disk
