= V518 Carinae =

Blue-hued variable star in the constellation Carina

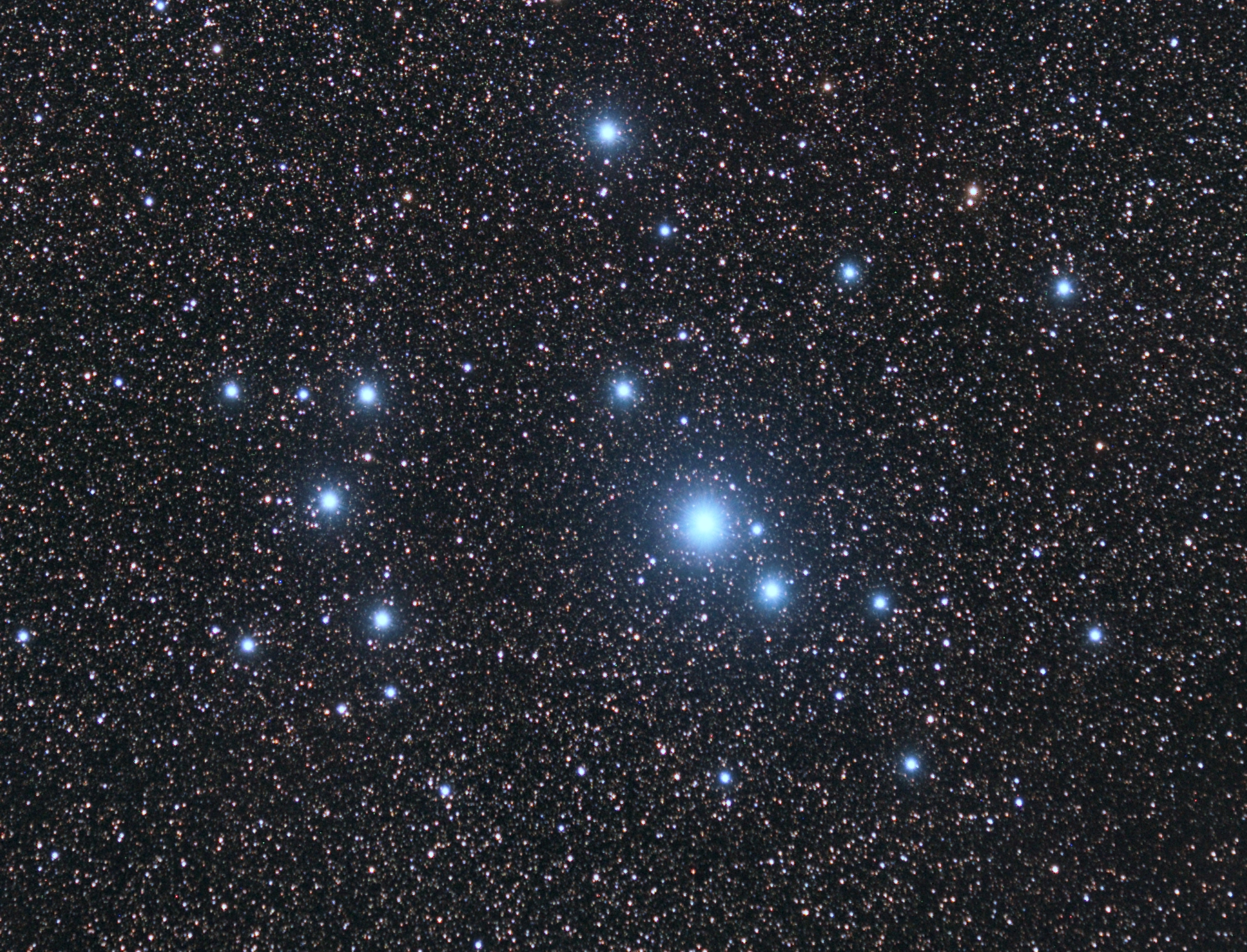
- Location of V518 Carinae in IC 2602 (circled)

Observation data Epoch J2000.0 Equinox ICRS
- Constellation: Carina
- Right ascension: 10^{h} 42^{m} 14.12927^{s}
- Declination: −64° 27′ 59.1340″
- Apparent magnitude (V): 4.63 - 4.82

Characteristics
- Evolutionary stage: main sequence
- Spectral type: B3/5V
- U−B color index: −0.58
- B−V color index: −0.14
- Variable type: γ Cas?

Astrometry
Proper motion (μ)	RA: −17.821 mas/yr Dec.: +11.580 mas/yr
Parallax (π)	6.7516±0.0843 mas
Distance	483 ± 6 ly (148 ± 2 pc)
Absolute magnitude (M_{V})	−1.169

Details
Mass	6.2 M_{☉}
Radius	3.30±0.07 R_{☉}
Luminosity	753 L_{☉}
Surface gravity (log g)	4.015 cgs
Temperature	15,397 K
Rotational velocity (v sin i)	120 km/s
Age	17.2 Myr

Other designations
- V518 Carinae, HD 92938, HIP 52370, HR 4196

Database references
SIMBAD	data

V518 Carinae (HR 4196) is a naked eye variable star in the constellation Carina. It is a member of the bright open cluster IC 2602 near the Carina Nebula.

== Location ==
V518 Carinae lies in the open cluster IC 2602, 5 arc minutes from its brightest member θ Carinae.

== Variability ==
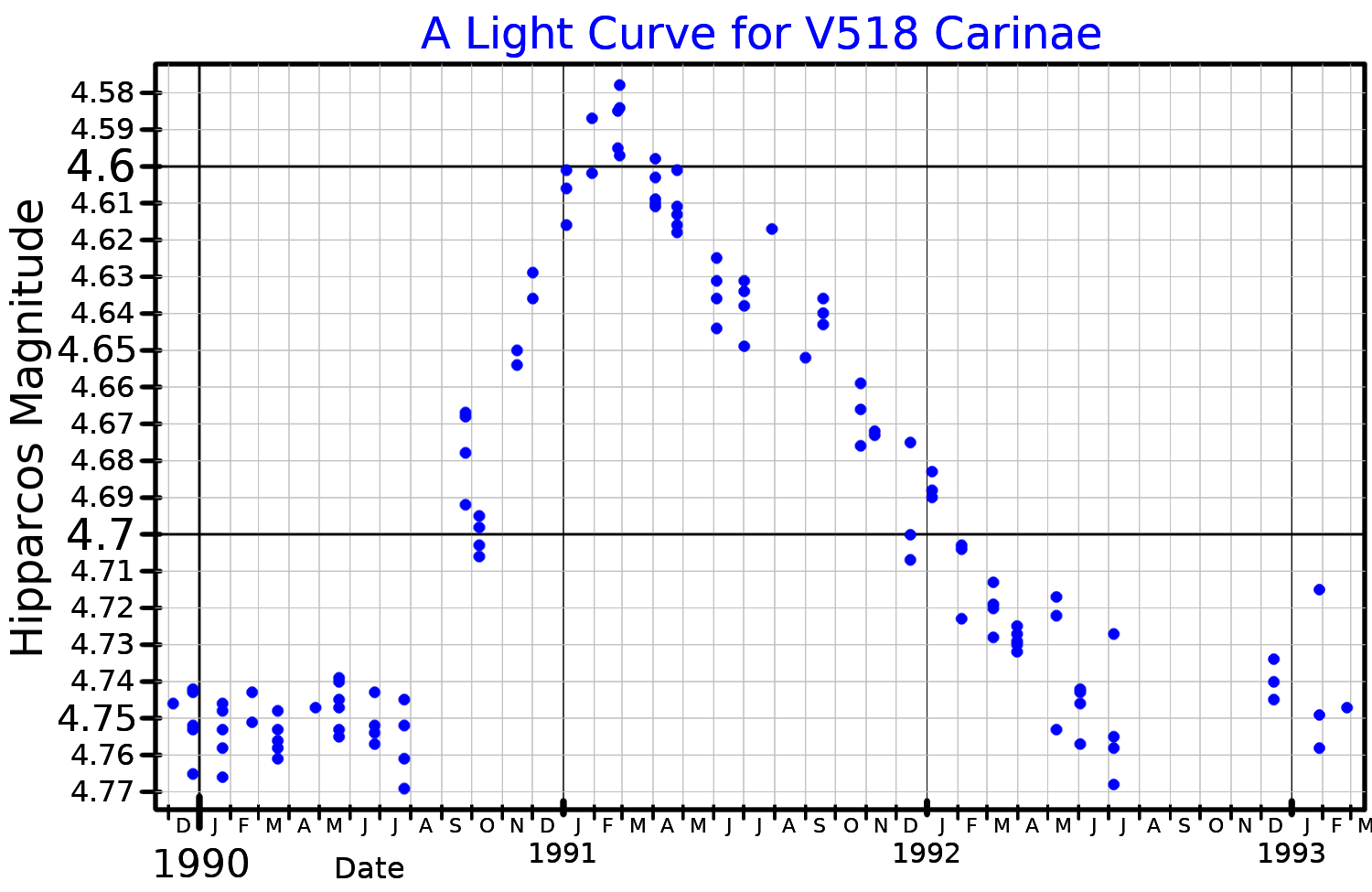
A light curve for V518 Carinae, plotted from Hipparcos data

V518 Carinae was discovered to change in brightness after analysis of Hipparcos photometry. The amplitude of the variations seen is 0.2 magnitudes, with possible periods of 100 and 971 days. It is classified as a γ Cassiopeiae variable.

== Spectral peculiarities ==
V518 Carinae is classified as a B-type main sequence star between B3 and B5. It is also catalogued as a helium star, a chemically peculiar star with abnormally strong helium absorption lines in its spectrum and relatively weak hydrogen lines. It is possibly a blue straggler.

V518 Carinae is also a Be star, a hot star with emission lines in its spectrum due to a disk of material around the star. Be stars that show irregular brightness changes due to the disk are grouped as γ Cassiopeiae variables. V518 Carinae is known to produce disk outbursts lasting several hundred days.
