= IC 4665 =

Open cluster in the constellation Opiuchus

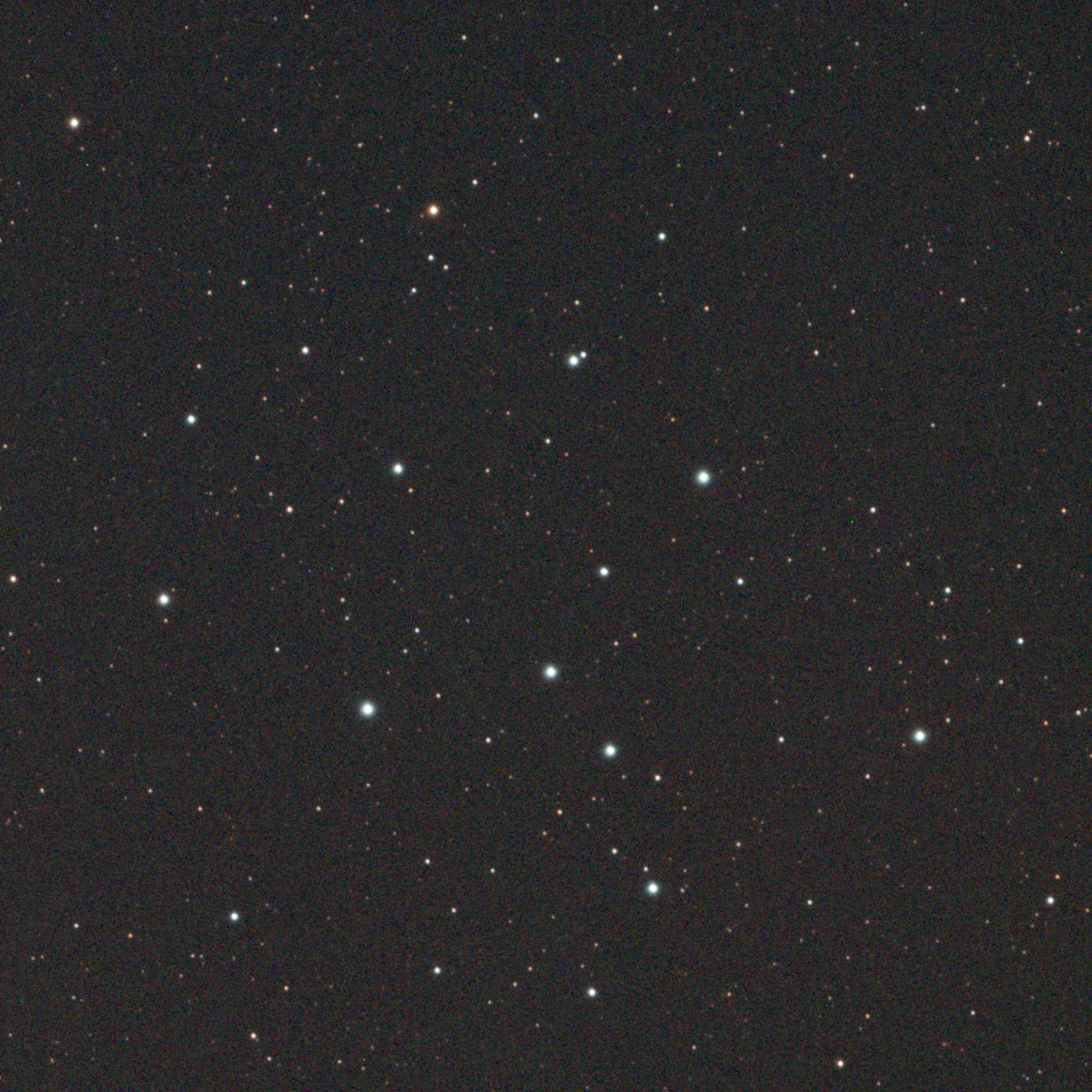
- Cluster IC 4665 in 2025

Observation data (J2000 epoch)
- Right ascension: 17^{h} 46^{m} 13.0^{s}
- Declination: +05° 36′ 54″
- Distance: 1.12 kly (343.6 pc)
- Apparent magnitude (V): 4.2
- Apparent dimensions (V): 40′ × 40′

Physical characteristics
- Radius: 33.59
- Estimated age: 55±3 Myr
- Other designations: Cr 349, Mel 179

Associations
- Constellation: Ophiuchus

IC 4665 (Collinder 349 / Melotte 179), also known as the Summer Beehive Cluster, Black Swallowtail Butterfly Cluster, Poseidon's Trident , is an open cluster of stars in the constellation Ophiuchus, about 1° to the northeast of the star Beta Ophiuchi. It was discovered by Swiss astronomer Philippe Loys de Chéseaux in 1745. The cluster lies about 1,100 light years away from Earth. It is easily visible in the smallest of telescopes and also with binoculars. From a sufficiently dark place it is also visible to the naked eye. It is one of the brightest clusters not to be cataloged by Charles Messier or William Herschel, probably because it is so loose and coarse.

Age estimates for this cluster have ranged from 20 up to as high as 100 million years. Comparison of the stellar lithium depletion with other clusters suggests it began to develop about 55 million years ago. The upper main sequence turnoff age is 42±12 Myr. 819 candidate cluster members have been identified. Two chemically peculiar stars were found to be members in 1977. It has an estimated mass of about 130 suns.

There is evidence that IC 4665 is undergoing a collision with the older cluster Collinder 350, located about 4° away. Currently they are separated by a distance of 118.2 ly (36.25 pc), after having formed at least 1,600 ly (500 pc) apart. It is unclear whether the two clusters will merge as a result of the collision.
