= HR 4102 =

Star in the constellation Carina

- Location of I Carinae (circled in red)

Observation data Epoch J2000.0 Equinox ICRS
- Constellation: Carina
- Right ascension: 10^{h} 24^{m} 23.70597^{s}
- Declination: −74° 01′ 53.8036″
- Apparent magnitude (V): 3.99

Characteristics
- Evolutionary stage: main sequence
- Spectral type: F3 V
- U−B color index: −0.01
- B−V color index: +0.36

Astrometry
Radial velocity (R_{v})	−4.7±0.6 km/s
Proper motion (μ)	RA: −16.29 mas/yr Dec.: −27.67 mas/yr
Parallax (π)	61.64±0.12 mas
Distance	52.9 ± 0.1 ly (16.22 ± 0.03 pc)
Absolute magnitude (M_{V})	+2.94

Details
Mass	1.46+0.07 −0.05 M_{☉}
Radius	1.61±0.03 R_{☉}
Luminosity	5.24+0.25 −0.26 L_{☉}
Surface gravity (log g)	4.34 cgs
Temperature	6,889+56 −57 K
Metallicity [Fe/H]	+0.02 dex
Rotational velocity (v sin i)	51.6 km/s
Age	1.34+0.46 −0.61 Gyr

Other designations
- I Car, CD−73°576, GJ 391, HD 90589, HIP 50954, HR 4102, SAO 256710

Database references
SIMBAD	data

I Carinae is a single, yellow-white hued star in the southern constellation Carina. It is a fourth magnitude star that is visible to the naked eye. An annual parallax shift of 61.64 mas provides a distance estimate of 62 light years. It is moving closer with a radial velocity of −5 km/s, and in an estimated 2.7 million years will pass within 24.3 ly (7.46 pc) of the Sun. In the next 7500 years, the south Celestial pole will pass close to this star and Omega Carinae (5800 CE).

This star has a stellar classification of F3 V, indicating it is an F-type main-sequence star that is generating energy through hydrogen fusion at its core. It is younger than the Sun with an estimated age of 1.3 billion years, and is spinning with a projected rotational velocity of 51.6 km/s. The star has 1.46 times the mass of the Sun, 1.61 times its radius, and is radiating 5.24 times the Sun's luminosity from its photosphere at an effective temperature of around 6,889 K. It is a variable star and most likely (99.2% chance) the source of detected X-ray emission coming from these coordinates.

Proper motion measurements of I Carinae taken by the Hipparcos and Gaia spacecraft show a statistically significant difference; this acceleration suggests the presence of a giant planet on a close orbit.
