= HD 93607 =

Star in the constellation Carina

- Location of HD 93607 in IC 2602 (circled)

Observation data Epoch J2000.0 Equinox ICRS
- Constellation: Carina
- Right ascension: 10^{h} 46^{m} 51.21898^{s}
- Declination: −64° 23′ 00.5045″
- Apparent magnitude (V): 4.87

Characteristics
- Evolutionary stage: main sequence
- Spectral type: B4V
- U−B color index: −0.655
- B−V color index: −0.15

Astrometry
Proper motion (μ)	RA: −18.590 mas/yr Dec.: +9.832 mas/yr
Parallax (π)	6.6468±0.0739 mas
Distance	491 ± 5 ly (150 ± 2 pc)
Absolute magnitude (M_{V})	−1.116

Details
Mass	5.9 M_{☉}
Radius	3.9 R_{☉}
Luminosity	893 L_{☉}
Surface gravity (log g)	4.098 cgs
Temperature	16,882 K
Metallicity [Fe/H]	+0.34 dex
Rotational velocity (v sin i)	160 km/s
Age	17.5 Myr

Other designations
- CPD−63 1655, HD 93607, HIP 52736, HR 4222, SAO 251120

Database references
SIMBAD	data

HD 93607 (HR 4222) is a star in the constellation Carina. Its apparent magnitude is 4.87. Its parent cluster is IC 2602.

HD 93607 is a B4 main sequence star, although older spectral studies classified it as a subgiant. It is included on a list of the least variable stars amongst those observed by the Hipparcos satellite, with a possible variation less than 0.01 magnitudes.

HD 93607 lies in the core region of the bright open cluster IC 3602. Its age is uncertain but around 17 million years.
