= BL Crucis =

Star in the constellation Crux

- Location of BL Crucis (circled)

Observation data Epoch J2000 Equinox ICRS
- Constellation: Crux
- Right ascension: 12^{h} 27^{m} 28.88^{s}
- Declination: −58° 59′ 30.4″
- Apparent magnitude (V): 5.43

Characteristics
- Evolutionary stage: AGB
- Spectral type: M4/5III
- Variable type: SR

Astrometry
Radial velocity (R_{v})	71.7±0.9 km/s
Proper motion (μ)	RA: −19.294 mas/yr Dec.: +4.680 mas/yr
Parallax (π)	6.8429±0.1942 mas
Distance	480 ± 10 ly (146 ± 4 pc)
Absolute magnitude (M_{V})	−0.28

Details
Mass	3.6 M_{☉}
Radius	106 R_{☉}
Luminosity	1,234 L_{☉}
Surface gravity (log g)	1.94 cgs
Temperature	3,320 K
Metallicity [Fe/H]	−0.33 dex

Other designations
- CD−58°4560, HD 108396, HIP 60781, HR 4739, SAO 239960

Database references
SIMBAD	data

BL Crucis is a red giant and a semiregular variable in the constellation of Crux. A 5th magnitude star, it is visible to the naked eye under good observing conditions. It is 480±10 light-years distant from Earth.

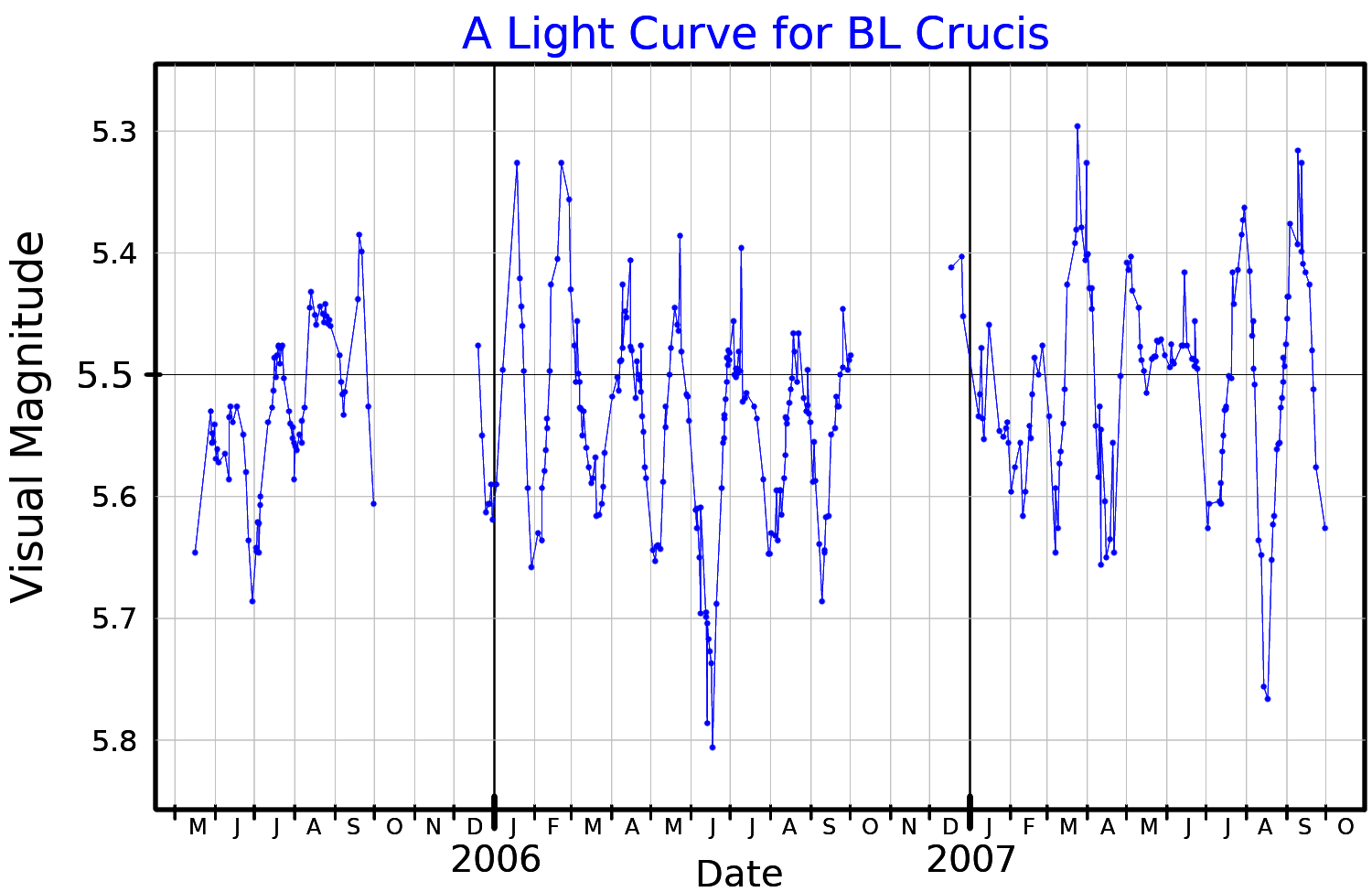
A light curve for BL Crucis, adapted from Tabur et al. (2009)

In 1969, Olin J. Eggen announced that the star, then called HR 4739, is a variable star. It was given its variable star designation, BL Crucis, in 1977. Three periods have been detected in its light curve, 30.7, 42.3 and 43.6 days. The maximum amplitude of variation is 0.35 magnitudes.

An aging red giant, BL Crucis is on the asymptotic giant branch having exhaust both its core hydrogen and core helium. It now fuses hydrogen and helium in separate shells outside the core.
