= Theta Carinae =

Star in the constellation Carina

θ Carinae
- Location of θ Carinae (circled)

Observation data Epoch J2000.0 Equinox ICRS
- Constellation: Carina
- Right ascension: 10^{h} 42^{m} 57.40197^{s}
- Declination: −64° 23′ 40.0208″
- Apparent magnitude (V): 2.76

Characteristics
- Evolutionary stage: Blue straggler
- Spectral type: B0.5 Vp
- U−B color index: −1.00
- B−V color index: −0.22

Astrometry
Radial velocity (R_{v})	+24 km/s
Proper motion (μ)	RA: −18.36 mas/yr Dec.: +12.03 mas/yr
Parallax (π)	7.16±0.21 mas
Distance	460 ± 10 ly (140 ± 4 pc)
Absolute magnitude (M_{V})	−3.10

Orbit
Period (P)	2.20288±0.00001 d
Eccentricity (e)	0.129±0.002
Argument of periastron (ω) (secondary)	81.8±1.7°
Semi-amplitude (K_{1}) (primary)	18.93±0.05 km/s

Details

θ Car A
Mass	14.9±0.4 M_{☉}
Radius	5.1 R_{☉}
Luminosity	14,500±1,000 L_{☉}
Surface gravity (log g)	4.20 cgs
Temperature	31,000±1,000 K
Rotational velocity (v sin i)	108±3 km/s
Age	35–46 Myr

Other designations
- θ Car, CPD−63°1599, FK5 406, HD 93030, HIP 52419, HR 4199, SAO 251083

Database references
SIMBAD	data

Theta Carinae is a binary star system in the southern constellation of Carina. Its name is a Bayer designation and is Latinized from θ Carinae, and abbreviated Theta Car or θ Car. With an apparent visual magnitude of 2.76, it is the brightest star in the open star cluster IC 2602, or the Southern Pleiades. It marks the northeastern end of the Diamond Cross asterism. Parallax measurements from the Hipparcos mission place this star at a distance of about 460 light-years (140 parsecs) from Earth.

In most versions of its asterism, the neighbouring bright stars, thus plotted along the imaginary hull that forms Carina are Omega Carinae which is approximately 120 light-years closer and PP (also known as p) Carinae, of a similar distance to Theta.

== Properties ==
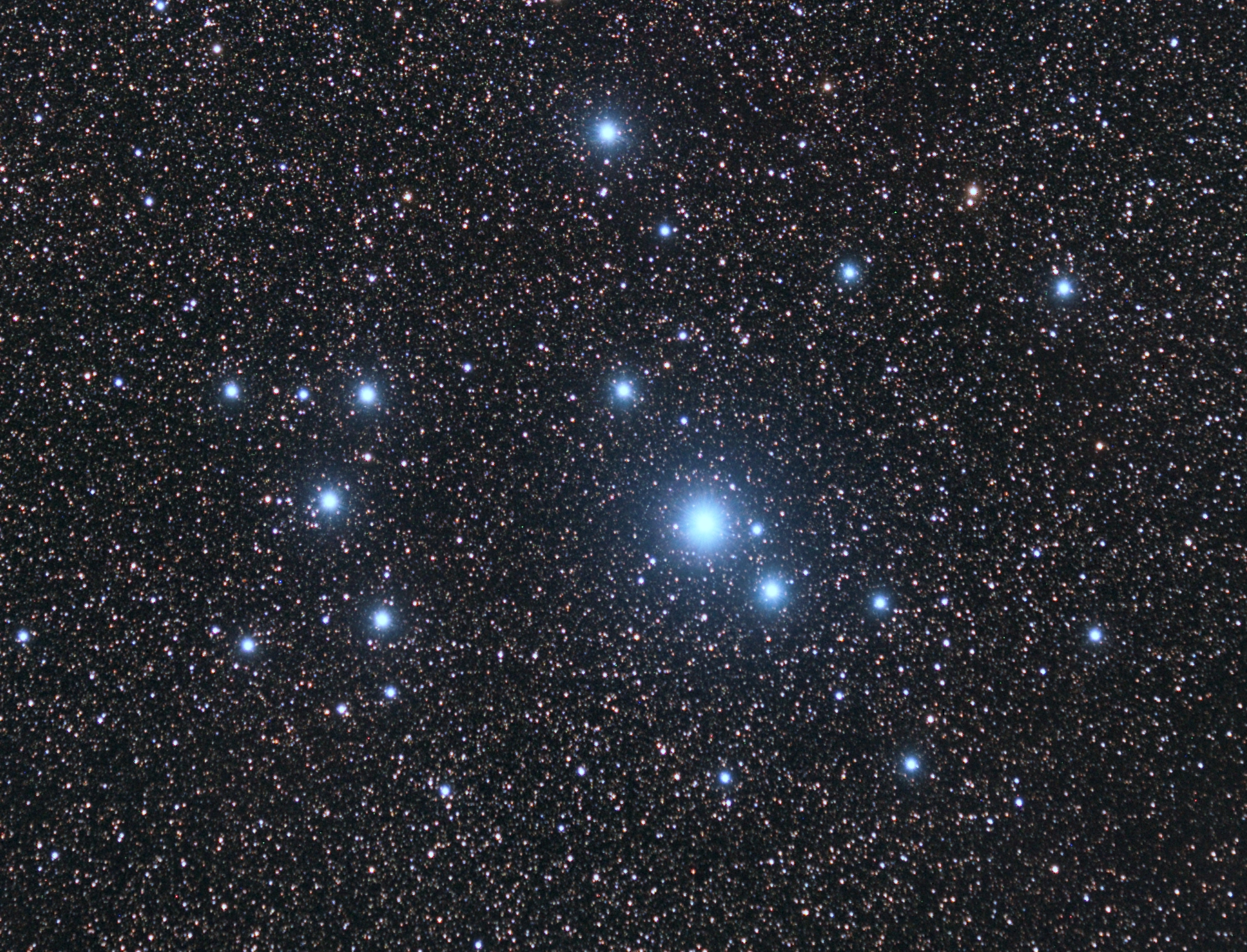
Image of IC 2602 with θ Car at the centre

Theta Carinae is a single-lined spectroscopic binary with a 2.2 day period; the shortest known orbital period among massive stars, suggesting earlier mass transfer between the two components, possibly explaining the spectral peculiarities. In this spectroscopic system, the primary star is a blue straggler, which is an unusual type of star created by merging or the interaction between two or more stars. The source of the mass transfer is likely to be the less massive secondary companion, and what is now the primary star was probably originally the less massive component. The estimated age of the pair is 4 million years, and it appears much younger than the surrounding IC 2602 cluster.

The MKK stellar classification of this star is B0.5 Vp, which indicates this B-type main sequence star generates energy through the nuclear fusion of hydrogen in its core. The 'p' suffix designates peculiar spectral features, which have been observed in both optical and ultraviolet wavelengths. The primary star has about 15 times the mass of the Sun and 5 times the Sun's radius. Theta Carinae has an intensely hot outer radiating envelope with an effective surface temperature of 31,000 K. Once the primary reaches around 11 million years old, the star will expand and will begin to transferring its outer surface mass back to its companion. Little is known about the companion star, but it is likely an F-type star with a luminosity less than 1% of the primary.

== Etymology ==
In Chinese, 南船 (Nán Chuán), meaning Southern Boat, refers to an asterism consisting of θ Carinae, V337 Carinae, PP Carinae, β Carinae and ω Carinae. Consequently, θ Carinae itself is known as 南船三 (Nán Chuán sān, English: the Third Star of Southern Boat).
