= HD 93194 =

Star in the constellation Carina

- Location of HD 93194 in IC 2602 (circled)

Observation data Epoch J2000.0 Equinox ICRS
- Constellation: Carina
- Right ascension: 10^{h} 44^{m} 06.91549^{s}
- Declination: −63° 57′ 39.8535″
- Apparent magnitude (V): 4.85

Characteristics
- Evolutionary stage: main sequence
- Spectral type: B3/5Vn
- U−B color index: −0.625
- B−V color index: −0.145

Astrometry
Parallax (π)	6.63±0.18 mas
Distance	490 ± 10 ly (151 ± 4 pc)
Absolute magnitude (M_{V})	−1.176

Details
Mass	5.4 M_{☉}
Radius	4.7 R_{☉}
Luminosity	676 L_{☉}
Surface gravity (log g)	4.10 cgs
Temperature	14,761 K
Metallicity [Fe/H]	−0.10 dex
Rotational velocity (v sin i)	310 km/s
Age	175 Myr

Other designations
- CD−63 1623, HD 93194, HIP 52502, HR 4205, SAO 251096

Database references
SIMBAD	data

HD 93194 (HR 4205) is a star in the constellation Carina. Its apparent magnitude is 4.79. Its parent cluster is IC 2602.

HD 93607 is a B4 main sequence star, notable for "nebulous" absorption lines caused by its rapid rotation. It is included on a list of the least variable stars amongst those observed by the Hipparcos satellite, with a possible variation less than 0.01 magnitudes.
