= 38 Aquarii =

Star in the constellation Aquarius

- Location of 38 Aquarii (circled)

Observation data Epoch J2000.0 Equinox ICRS
- Constellation: Aquarius
- Right ascension: 22^{h} 10^{m} 37.48206^{s}
- Declination: −11° 33′ 53.7754″
- Apparent magnitude (V): +5.43

Characteristics
- Spectral type: B5 III
- B−V color index: −0.12

Astrometry
Radial velocity (R_{v})	+1.5 km/s
Proper motion (μ)	RA: +29.29 mas/yr Dec.: +8.76 mas/yr
Parallax (π)	7.25±0.33 mas
Distance	450 ± 20 ly (138 ± 6 pc)
Absolute magnitude (M_{V})	−0.26

Details
Radius	5.6 R_{☉}
Luminosity	219.16 L_{☉}
Surface gravity (log g)	4.00 cgs
Temperature	13,860 K
Metallicity [Fe/H]	–0.26 dex
Rotational velocity (v sin i)	20 km/s

Other designations
- 38 Aqr, BD−12°6196, FK5 3771, HD 210424, HIP 109472, HR 8452, SAO 164910

Database references
SIMBAD	data

38 Aquarii is a star in the equatorial constellation of Aquarius. 38 Aquarii is its Flamsteed designation; its Bayer designation is e Aquarii. It is a faint star but visible to the naked eye, with an apparent visual magnitude of +5.43. Based on parallax measurements, it is around 450 light-years (140 parsecs) away; it is 0.28 degree south of the ecliptic.

The spectrum of 38 Aquarii matches a stellar classification of B5 III. A luminosity class of III indicates that this is an evolved giant star. It has 5.6 times the radius of the Sun and is spinning with a projected rotational velocity of 20 km/s. The outer atmosphere of the star has a blue-white glow from an effective temperature of 13,860 K.
