= PSR J1928+1815 =

Millisecond pulsar in the constellation Sagitta

- Diagram showing the common envelope phase.

Observation data Epoch J2000.0 Equinox ICRS
- Constellation: Sagitta
- Right ascension: 19^{h} 28^{m} 08.3490^{s}
- Declination: +18° 15′ 30.270″

Astrometry
Distance	455 ly (139 pc)

Details
Mass	1.44 M_{☉}
Rotation	10.5494989888508 ms
Age	46 Myr

Other designations
- PSR J1928+1815

Database references
SIMBAD	data

PSR J1928+1815 is a millisecond pulsar located 455 light years (139 parsecs) from Earth with a rotation period of 10.549 milliseconds and is characteristic age of 46 million years old. It is in a 3.6 hour long binary orbit with a helium-dominated star with 1.0–1.6 solar masses that recently went through a red giant phase.

Theoretical models have shown that relatively recently, the helium star which was then a main sequence star expanded into a red giant star engulfing PSR J1928+1815 within its outer envelope layers. After several thousand years, the outer envelope was ejected into space and some mass was transferred to the millisecond pulsar increasing its spin rate. This binary system has scientific value since while models predict that binary stars will likely have one star orbiting within the expanded envelope of the other dying star, it has not been observed. It is estimated that there are around 16 to 84 of theses stars located somewhere in the Milky Way galaxy with the PSR J1928+1815 binary system being one of them.
