= PP Carinae =

Star in the constellation Carina

- Location of PP Carinae (circled)

Observation data Epoch J2000.0 Equinox ICRS
- Constellation: Carina
- Right ascension: 10^{h} 32^{m} 01.46297^{s}
- Declination: −61° 41′ 07.1963″
- Apparent magnitude (V): 3.22 - 3.55

Characteristics
- Spectral type: B4 Vne
- U−B color index: −0.71
- B−V color index: −0.11
- Variable type: γ Cas

Astrometry
Radial velocity (R_{v})	+26.0 km/s
Proper motion (μ)	RA: −17.01 mas/yr Dec.: +11.50 mas/yr
Parallax (π)	6.75±0.40 mas
Distance	480 ± 30 ly (148 ± 9 pc)
Absolute magnitude (M_{V})	−2.684

Details
Mass	7.6±0.1 M_{☉}
Radius	7.95±0.16 R_{☉}
Luminosity	5,212 L_{☉}
Surface gravity (log g)	2.96±0.03 cgs
Temperature	17,410±174 K
Rotational velocity (v sin i)	280±6 km/s
Age	39.8±7.6 Myr

Other designations
- p Carinae, PP Carinae, CP−61°1704, FK5 397, HD 91465, HIP 51576, HR 4140, SAO 251006

Database references
SIMBAD	data

p Carinae is a star in the southern constellation of Carina. It has the variable star designation PP Carinae and, at an apparent visual magnitude of +3.3, is readily visible to the naked eye from the southern hemisphere. From the observed parallax shift of this star as the Earth orbits the Sun, its distance can be estimated as roughly 480 light-years (150 parsecs) with a 6% margin of error. It is considered to be a member of the open cluster IC 2602 although it lies well outside the core visible group of stars.

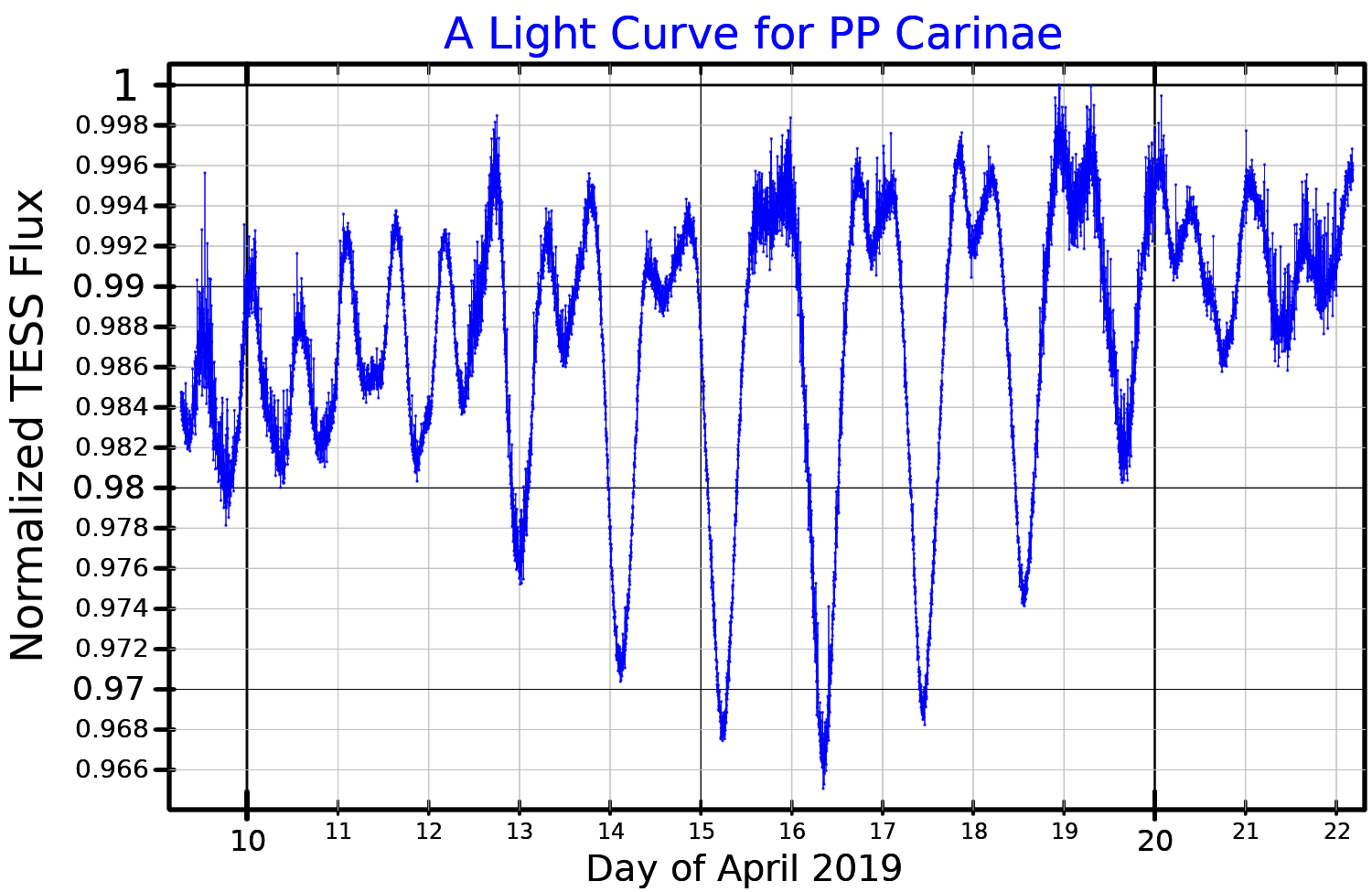
A light curve for PP Carinae, plotted from TESS data

The star is a B-type main sequence star with a stellar classification of B4 Vne. The 'ne' suffix indicates it is a rapidly rotating Be star that is surrounded by hot circumstellar gas. This material adds emission lines to the spectrum of the star. It has a projected rotational velocity of 325 km s^{−1}, with about 7.6 times the mass and eight times the radius of the Sun. Alan William James Cousins announced the discovery that this star is a variable star, in 1951. This star is classified as a Gamma Cassiopeiae-type variable and its brightness varies from magnitude +3.22 to +3.55.

In most versions of its asterism, the neighbouring bright stars, thus plotted along the imaginary hull forming Carina are Theta Carinae, to the south, and V337 (also known as lower case q) Carinae to the east, of second and third magnitude respectively.
