= Omicron Lupi =

Binary star system in the constellation Lupus

- Location of ο Lupi (circled in red)

Observation data Epoch J2000.0 Equinox J2000.0 (ICRS)
- Constellation: Lupus
- Right ascension: 14^{h} 51^{m} 38.30289^{s}
- Declination: −43° 34′ 31.2965″
- Apparent magnitude (V): 4.323 (4.84 + 5.27)

Characteristics
- Spectral type: B5 IV
- U−B color index: −0.620
- B−V color index: −0.159

Astrometry
Radial velocity (R_{v})	+7.30±0.74 km/s
Proper motion (μ)	RA: −25.20 mas/yr Dec.: −27.13 mas/yr
Parallax (π)	8.07±0.59 mas
Distance	400 ± 30 ly (124 ± 9 pc)
Absolute magnitude (M_{V})	−1.2±0.3

Details
Mass	5.7±0.2 M_{☉}
Radius	3.5 R_{☉}
Luminosity	1,260 L_{☉}
Surface gravity (log g)	4.1±0.1 cgs
Temperature	18,000 K
Rotational velocity (v sin i)	25 km/s

Other designations
- ο Lup, CD−43°9391, HD 130807, HIP 72683, HR 5528, SAO 225248

Database references
SIMBAD	data

Omicron Lupi (ο Lup) is a binary star in the southern constellation of Lupus. It is a visible to the naked eye with a combined apparent visual magnitude of 4.323. Based upon an annual parallax shift of 8.07 mas as seen from Earth, it is located around 400 light-years from the Sun, give or take 30 light-years. At that distance, the visual magnitude of the system is diminished by an extinction factor of 0.13±0.01 due to interstellar dust. It is a member of the Upper Centaurus–Lupus subgroup of the nearby Scorpius–Centaurus association.

This is a visual binary star system with the components having an angular separation of 0.1 arcsecond. The primary, component A, is a magnitude 4.84 B-type subgiant star with a stellar classification of B5 V. It displays radial velocity variations indicating it has an unseen second companion orbiting at a separation of at least 17 AU with a period of 27 years or more. The spectrum of the primary displays a Zeeman effect indicating a magnetic field with a strength ranging from −94 to 677 G. The visible companion, component B, has a visual magnitude of 5.27.
