= Mu Lupi =

Multiple star system in the constellation of Lupus

- Location of μ Lupi (circled in red)

Observation data Epoch J2000.0 Equinox J2000.0 (ICRS)
- Constellation: Lupus
- Right ascension: 15^{h} 18^{m} 32.02296^{s}
- Declination: −47° 52′ 30.9957″
- Apparent magnitude (V): 4.29

Characteristics
- Spectral type: B8 Ve (AB) + A2/3(V) (C)
- U−B color index: −0.41
- B−V color index: −0.03

Astrometry
Radial velocity (R_{v})	+14.90±1.78 km/s
Proper motion (μ)	RA: −29.59 mas/yr Dec.: −35.07 mas/yr
Parallax (π)	9.72±0.71 mas
Distance	340 ± 20 ly (103 ± 8 pc)
Absolute magnitude (M_{V})	−0.57

Orbit
Primary	A
Companion	B
Period (P)	772 yr
Semi-major axis (a)	1.657″
Eccentricity (e)	0.43
Inclination (i)	114.6°
Periastron epoch (T)	2048

Orbit
Primary	Ca
Companion	Cb
Period (P)	12.353±0.004 days
Eccentricity (e)	0.4±0.1
Periastron epoch (T)	2,455,177.7 JD
Argument of periastron (ω) (primary)	324±18°
Semi-amplitude (K_{1}) (primary)	2.4±0.4 km/s

Details

A
Mass	3.16 M_{☉}
Rotational velocity (v sin i)	280 km/s

B
Mass	3.07 M_{☉}
Rotational velocity (v sin i)	50 km/s

Ca
Mass	1.78 M_{☉}
Temperature	8,500 K

Cb
Mass	0.05 M_{☉}

Other designations
- μ Lup, CD−47°9860, FK5 , HD 135734, HIP 74911, HR 5683, SAO 225638, WDS J15185-4753AB

Database references
SIMBAD	data

Mu Lupi (μ Lup) is a system of three confirmed stars and one brown dwarf in the southern constellation of Lupus. It is visible to the naked eye with an apparent visual magnitude of 4.29 and lies roughly 340 light-years from the Sun.

Two of the components of this system, A and B, form a pair with an angular separation of 1.657 arcseconds. An orbital solution gives an orbital period of 772 years. Component C, an A-type main-sequence star, lies at an angular separation of 23.3 arcseconds from the AB pair, and is itself a binary with an orbital period of 12.35 days. Its companion has a mass of 0.05 M_{☉}, too low to fuse hydrogen, and thus it is considered a brown dwarf. A fifth component, not confirmed to be a physical companion, lies at an angular separation of 6.10 arcseconds from component AB, and with a mass of 0.05 M_{☉} is also a brown dwarf.
