= Lambda Lupi =

Triple star system in the constellation Lupus

- Location of λ Lupi (circled in red)

Observation data Epoch J2000.0 Equinox J2000.0 (ICRS)
- Constellation: Lupus
- Right ascension: 15^{h} 08^{m} 50.61639^{s}
- Declination: −45° 16′ 47.4950″
- Apparent magnitude (V): 4.04 (4.43 + 5.23)

Characteristics
- Spectral type: B3 V (B3 V + B3 V)
- U−B color index: −0.67
- B−V color index: −0.18

Astrometry
Radial velocity (R_{v})	+9.80±1.78 km/s
Proper motion (μ)	RA: −15.88 mas/yr Dec.: −26.80 mas/yr
Parallax (π)	4.20±0.66 mas
Distance	approx. 800 ly (approx. 240 pc)
Absolute magnitude (M_{V})	−2.75

Orbit
Period (P)	70.8±0.8 yr
Semi-major axis (a)	0.2597±0.0021″
Eccentricity (e)	0.6283±0.0090
Inclination (i)	71.59±0.41°
Longitude of the node (Ω)	26.64±0.61°
Periastron epoch (T)	1997.907 ± 0.105
Argument of periastron (ω) (secondary)	299.9±1.1°

Details

λ Lup A
Mass	8.14 M_{☉}
Rotational velocity (v sin i)	135 km/s
Age	28.1±4.1 Myr

λ Lup B
Mass	5.84 M_{☉}

Other designations
- λ Lup, CD−44°9889, HD 133955, HIP 74117, HR 5626, SAO 225483, WDS J15088-4517AB

Database references
SIMBAD	data

Lambda Lupi, Latinized from λ Lupi, is a triple star system in the southern constellation of Lupus. It is visible to the naked eye with a combined apparent visual magnitude of 4.04. Based upon an annual parallax shift of just 4.20 mas as seen from Earth, it is located roughly 800 light years from the Sun. The system has a peculiar velocity of 27.4±4.9 km/s relative to its neighbors, making it a candidate runaway star system. It is a member of the Upper Centaurus–Lupus sub-group in the Scorpius–Centaurus OB association.

The two visible components of this system orbit each other over a period of 70.8 years with a large eccentricity of 0.63. The primary component has a visual magnitude of 4.43, while the secondary is of magnitude 5.23. Both are B-type main sequence stars with a stellar classification of B3 V. One of the pair is itself a double-lined spectroscopic binary, making this a triple star system.
