= Pi Lupi =

Multiple star system in the constellation Lupus

π Lupi
- Location of π Lupi (circled in red)

Observation data Epoch J2000 Equinox ICRS
- Constellation: Lupus
- Right ascension: 15^{h} 05^{m} 07.08596^{s}
- Declination: −47° 03′ 04.4976″
- Apparent magnitude (V): 3.89

Characteristics
- Spectral type: B5V + B5IV
- U−B color index: −0.59
- B−V color index: −0.14

Astrometry
Radial velocity (R_{v})	+4.50 km/s
Proper motion (μ)	RA: −22.98 mas/yr Dec.: −22.81 mas/yr
Parallax (π)	7.36±0.55 mas
Distance	440 ± 30 ly (140 ± 10 pc)

Details

A
Mass	4.5 M_{☉}
Surface gravity (log g)	4.5 cgs
Temperature	16,000 K
Rotational velocity (v sin i)	10 km/s

B
Mass	4.7 M_{☉}
Temperature	14,000 K
Rotational velocity (v sin i)	10 km/s
Age	14 Myr

Other designations
- CD−46°9773, HIP 73807, SAO 225426
- π Lupi A: HD 133242, HR 5605
- π Lupi B: HD 133243, HR 5606

Database references
SIMBAD	data
- A
- B

π Lupi (Latinised to Pi Lupi) is a multiple star system in the southern constellation Lupus. Two components form a wide binary pair with an orbital period of 517 years and a semimajor axis of 1.59″. They belong to the Upper Centaurus Lupus component of the Sco–Cen complex.

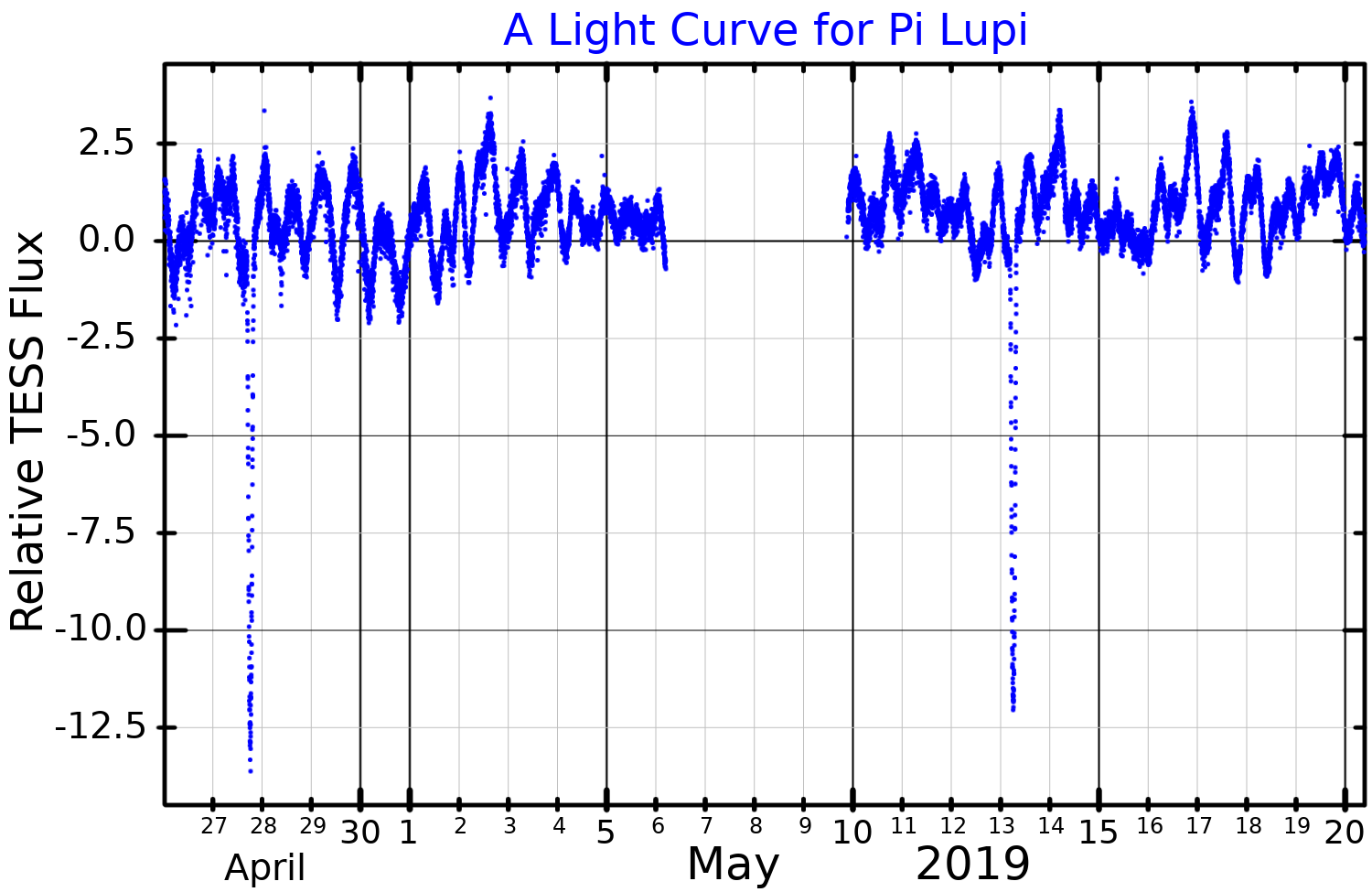
A light curve for Pi Lupi, adapted from Sharma et al. (2022)

At least one of the components is a spectroscopic binary and produces eclipses 15.5 days apart, making it an eclipsing binary. There are also other brightness variations with a period of 16 hours that are likely to be pulsations of the Slowly pulsating B-type star. The eclipses are shallow, with the brightness dropping by only 1% or about 0.01 magnitudes. The amplitude of the pulsations is even smaller.

π Lupi A (HR 5605, HD 133242) has been classified as a spectroscopic binary by at least two studies, but both components may be spectroscopic binaries.
