= Lithium depletion boundary =

The lithium depletion boundary (LDB) technique is a method proposed for dating open clusters based on a determination of the lithium abundances of a cluster's stars whose masses are at about the hydrogen burning mass limit. This technique is limited to clusters that are 20 to 200 Myr old.
