= V337 Carinae =

Star in the constellation of Carina

- Location of V337 Carinae (circled)

Observation data Epoch J2000.0 Equinox J2000.0 (ICRS)
- Constellation: Carina
- Right ascension: 10^{h} 17^{m} 04.9753^{s}
- Declination: −61° 19′ 56.288″
- Apparent magnitude (V): 3.36 to 3.44

Characteristics
- Spectral type: K2.5II
- U−B color index: +1.72
- B−V color index: +1.54
- R−I color index: +0.77
- Variable type: LC

Astrometry
Radial velocity (R_{v})	8.2±0.9 km/s
Proper motion (μ)	RA: −23.922 mas/yr Dec.: 6.734 mas/yr
Parallax (π)	4.3046±0.1345 mas
Distance	760 ± 20 ly (232 ± 7 pc)

Details
Mass	9.0 or 6.9 M_{☉}
Radius	128 R_{☉}
Luminosity	3,236 L_{☉}
Surface gravity (log g)	1.17 - 1.36 cgs
Temperature	4,118 K
Metallicity [Fe/H]	0.54 dex
Age	45.5 Myr

Other designations
- V337 Car, q Carinae, q Car, CCDM J10171-6120A, CD−60°3010, CPD−60°1817, CSI−60° 1817 41, FK5 1264, GC 14133, GSC 08943-03447, HD 89388, HIP 50371, HR 4050, IDS 10137-6050 A, PPM 357895, SAO 250905, TYC 8943-3447-1

Database references
SIMBAD	data

V337 Carinae (V337 Car, q Carinae) is a K-type bright giant star in the constellation of Carina. It is an irregular variable and has an apparent visual magnitude which varies between 3.36 and 3.44. It is easily visible to the naked eye, except in brightly lit urban areas.

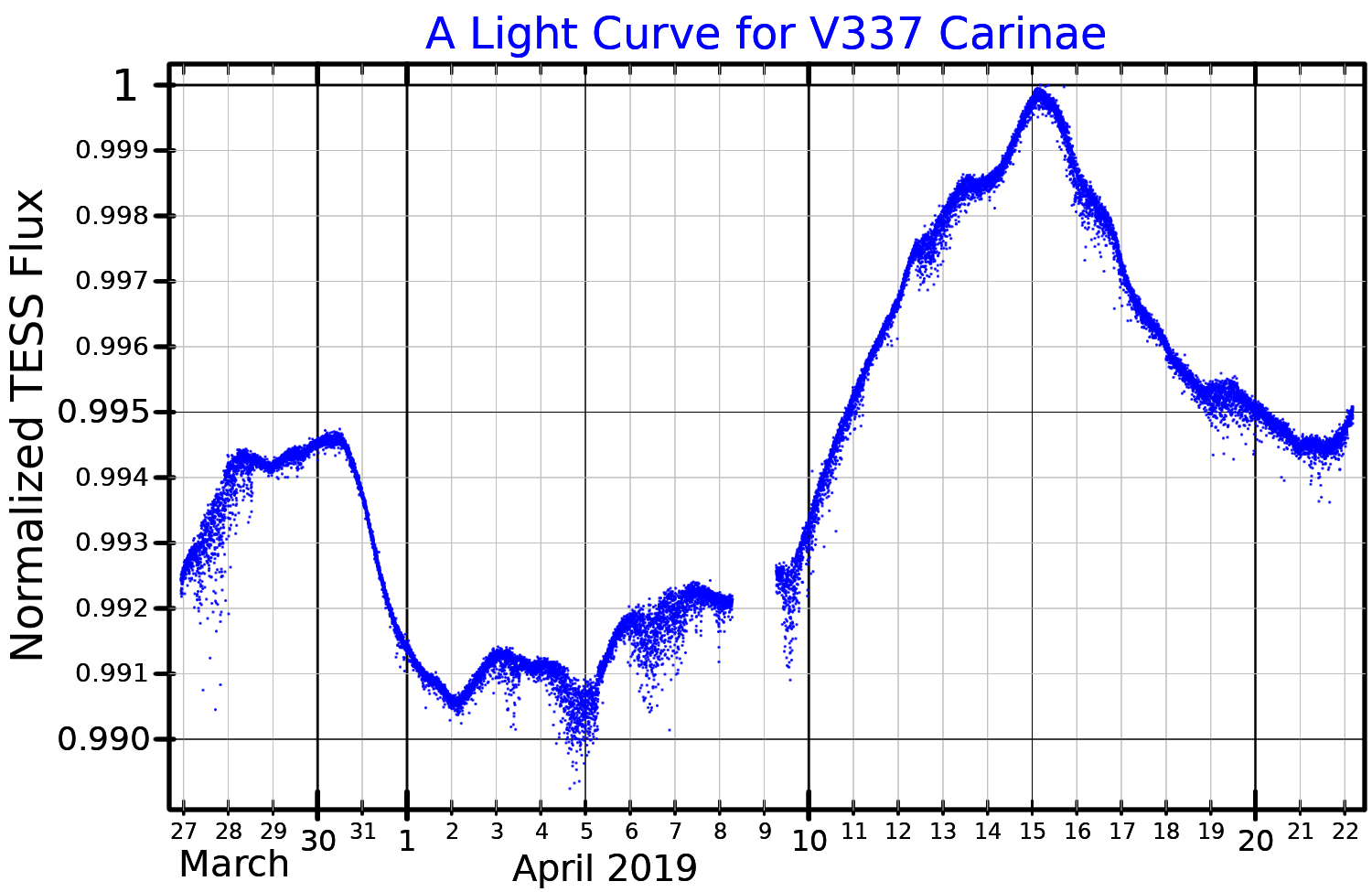
A light curve for V337 Carinae, plotted from TESS data

Benjamin Apthorp Gould listed the star as possibly variable in his 1879 publication Uranometria Argentina, when it was known as q Carinae. It was given its variable star designation, V337 Carinae, nearly 100 years later, in 1973.

V337 Carinae has a spectral class of K2.5II, indicating a bright giant. It is considered likely to be on the red giant branch of stars fusing hydrogen around an inert helium core. However, with a mass nine times that of the Sun, it is also an accepted supernova candidate. Its limb-darkened angular diameter has been measured using interferometry at 2.4 mas.

V337 Carinae has two companions listed in multiple star catalogues. Both are 13th-magnitude stars, component B 16.9″ and component C 25.9″ away. Component B is a distant background star, while component C is at about the same distance as V337 Carinae.
