= Zeta Aurigae =

Binary star system in the constellation Auriga

ζ Aurigae
- Location of ζ Aurigae (circled)

Observation data Epoch J2000 Equinox ICRS
- Constellation: Auriga
- Right ascension: 05^{h} 02^{m} 28.683^{s}
- Declination: +41° 04′ 33.00″
- Apparent magnitude (V): 3.751 (3.70–3.97)

Characteristics
- Spectral type: K5II (or K5Ib) + B7 V
- U−B color index: +0.374
- B−V color index: +1.293
- R−I color index: 0.87
- Variable type: Algol

Astrometry
Radial velocity (R_{v})	+12.11 km/s
Proper motion (μ)	RA: +12.093 mas/yr Dec.: −19.324 mas/yr
Parallax (π)	3.791±0.05 mas
Distance	860 ± 10 ly (264 ± 3 pc)
Absolute magnitude (M_{V})	−3.21

Orbit
Period (P)	972.162 d (2.66 yr)
Semi-major axis (a)	905 R_{☉}
Eccentricity (e)	0.3973±0.0007
Inclination (i)	87.0°
Periastron epoch (T)	RJD 53039.9 ± 0.10
Argument of periastron (ω) (secondary)	328.9°±0.13°
Semi-amplitude (K_{1}) (primary)	23.17±0.02 km/s

Details

ζ Aur A
Mass	5.8±0.2 M_{☉}
Radius	148±3 R_{☉}
Luminosity	4,786 L_{☉}
Surface gravity (log g)	1.33 cgs
Temperature	3,960±100 K
Metallicity [Fe/H]	−0.26 dex
Rotational velocity (v sin i)	5.7±1 km/s

ζ Aur B
Mass	4.8±0.2 M_{☉}
Radius	4.5±0.5 R_{☉}
Temperature	15,200±200 K

Other designations
- Saclateni, ζ Aur, Zeta Aur, 8 Aurigae, BD+40°1142, FK5 1137, GC 6137, HD 32068, HIP 23453, HR 1612, SAO 39966, PPM 47641, WDS 05025+4105

Database references
SIMBAD	data

Zeta Aurigae is an eclipsing binary star system in the northern constellation of Auriga. Its name is a Bayer designation that is Latinized from ζ Aurigae, and abbreviated Zeta Aur or ζ Aur. Based upon parallax measurements, this system is approximately 860 light-years (260 parsecs) distant from the Sun. It has a combined apparent visual magnitude of 3.75, which is bright enough to be seen with the naked eye. The system is drifting further away from the Sun with a radial velocity of +12 km/s.

The two components are designated Zeta Aurigae A and B. The bright giant or supergiant component A has the official name Saclateni, pronounced /sækləˈtiːni/, which is an old misspelling of "Sadatoni". Its hotter companion is a B-type dwarf. The pair orbit each other with a period of 2.66 yr.

== Nomenclature ==
ζ Aurigae (Latinised to Zeta Aurigae) is the system's Bayer designation. The designations of the two components as ζ Aurigae A and B derive from the convention used by the Washington Multiplicity Catalog (WMC) for multiple star systems, and adopted by the International Astronomical Union (IAU).

The system bore the traditional names Haedus I (also Hoedus) and Sadatoni (rarely Saclateni). It was one of the two haedi (Latin: 'kids') of the she-goat Capella, the other being Haedus II, Eta Aurigae. The name Sadatoni is from the Arabic الساعد الثاني as-sā^{c}id aθ-θānī "the second arm (of the charioteer)". The rare traditional name Azaleh is shared (in the form Hassaleh) with Iota Aurigae. In 2016, the IAU organized a Working Group on Star Names (WGSN) to catalog and standardize proper names for stars. The WGSN decided to attribute proper names to individual stars rather than entire multiple systems. It approved the names Saclateni for the component Zeta Aurigae A and Haedus for Eta Aurigae on 30 June 2017 and they are both now so included in the List of IAU-approved Star Names.

In Chinese, 柱 (Zhù), meaning Pillars, refers to an asterism consisting of Zeta Aurigae, Epsilon Aurigae, Eta Aurigae, Upsilon Aurigae, Nu Aurigae, Tau Aurigae, Chi Aurigae and 26 Aurigae. Consequently, the Chinese name for Zeta Aurigae itself is 柱二 (Zhù èr, English: the Second Star of Pillars.)

== Properties ==
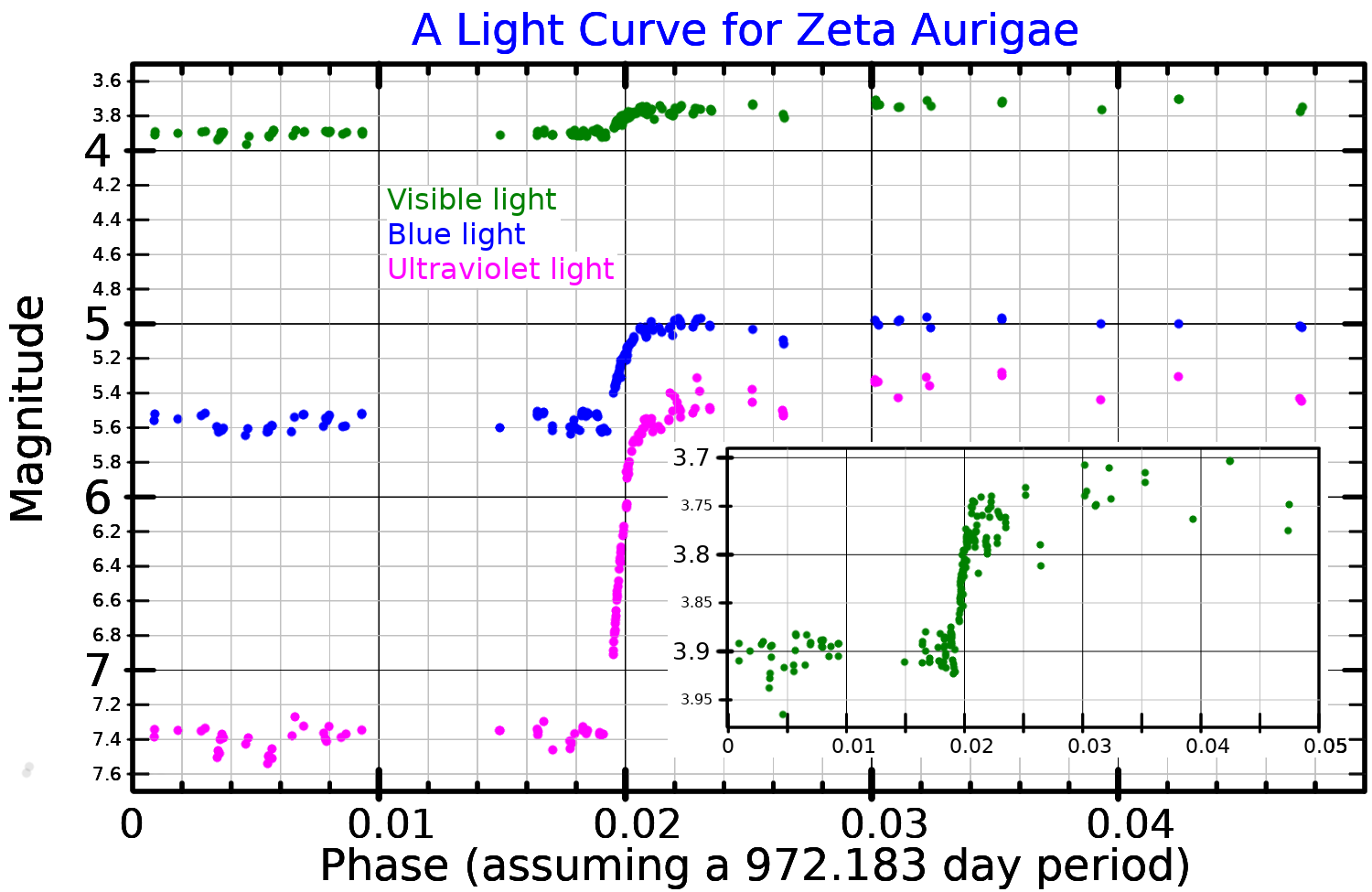
A light curve for Zeta Aurigae showing the brightness change as an eclipse ends, in three photometric colors. The inset plot shows the visible band data with an expanded vertical scale. Adapted from Bennett et al. (1996)

Zeta Aurigae was first recognized as a spectroscopic binary by William Hammond Wright while analyzing photographic plates taken at Lick Observatory between 1898 and 1908. This star is among those earlier described by Antonia Maury as having a composite spectrum. The first orbit was determined in 1924 by William Edmund Harper using measurements taken at Dominion Observatory, his orbital elements are very similar to the most recent determinations. Harper also noticed that the composite nature of the spectrum had disappeared on the one plate when the K type primary was nearest the sun indicating a possible eclipse. In 1932 the eclipsing binary nature of the system was confirmed by Paul Guthnick, Heribert Schneller and independently by Josef Hopmann.

The orbital plane of this eclipsing system is oriented close to the line of sight from the Earth, with an inclination estimated as 87.0°. As a result, an eclipse of one star by the other occurs during each orbit, causing the net magnitude to decrease to +3.99. The pair have an orbital period of 972 days (2.66 years) and an eccentricity (ovalness) of 0.4. The primary, component A, has been categorized as a K-type bright giant or supergiant star. Its companion, component B, is a B-type main-sequence star with a stellar classification B5 V or B7 V. Because component B has a much hotter photosphere than component A, component B produces most of the system's ultraviolet light. This causes the brightness change seen during the eclipses (when B is obscured) to be much greater in ultraviolet light than it is in visible light.
