= Eta Aurigae =

Star in the constellation Auriga

η Aurigae
- Location of η Aurigae (circled)

Observation data Epoch J2000 Equinox ICRS
- Constellation: Auriga
- Right ascension: 05^{h} 06^{m} 30.89337^{s}
- Declination: +41° 14′ 04.1127″
- Apparent magnitude (V): 3.18

Characteristics
- Spectral type: B3 V
- U−B color index: −0.66
- B−V color index: −0.18
- R−I color index: −0.17
- Variable type: SPB

Astrometry
Radial velocity (R_{v})	+7.3 km/s
Proper motion (μ)	RA: +31.45 mas/yr Dec.: −67.87 mas/yr
Parallax (π)	13.40±0.20 mas
Distance	243 ± 4 ly (75 ± 1 pc)
Absolute magnitude (M_{V})	−1.18

Details
Mass	5.6±0.1 M_{☉}
Radius	3.64±0.10 R_{☉}
Luminosity	1,450±70 L_{☉}
Surface gravity (log g)	4.13±0.04 cgs
Temperature	18,660±230 K
Rotational velocity (v sin i)	95 km/s
Age	41±6 Myr

Other designations
- Haedus, η Aur, 10 Aurigae, BD+41°1058, FK5 185, GC 6226, HD 32630, HIP 23767, HR 1641, SAO 40026, PPM 47723

Database references
SIMBAD	data

Eta Aurigae is a star in the northern constellation of Auriga. Its identifier is a Bayer designation that is Latinized from η Aurigae, and abbreviated Eta Aur or η Aur. The star is officially named Haedus, pronounced /ˈhiːdəs/. With an apparent visual magnitude of 3.18, it is visible to the naked eye. Based upon parallax measurements made during the Hipparcos mission, this star is approximately 243 light-years (75 parsecs) distant from the Sun, at least ten times nearer than the next (angularly close) star of the bright stars forming the asterism (Epsilon Aurigae). It is currently receding with a radial velocity of +7 km/s.

== Nomenclature ==
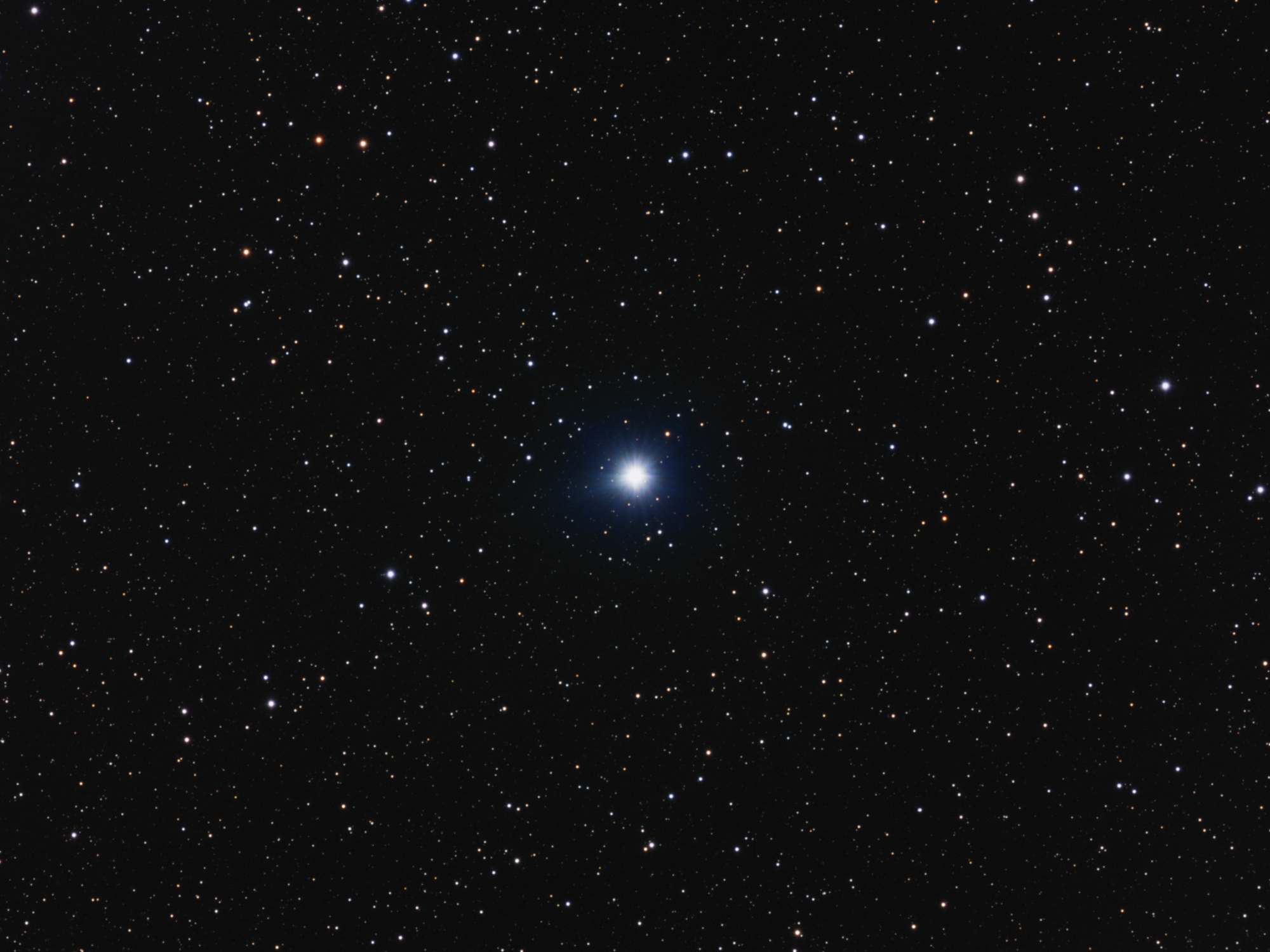
η Aurigae in optical light

η Aurigae (Latinised to Eta Aurigae) is the star's Bayer designation.

Along with Zeta Aurigae it represents one of the kids of the she-goat Capella, from which it derived its Latin traditional name Haedus II or Hoedus II, from the Latin haedus "kid" (Zeta Aurigae was Haedus I). It also had the less common traditional name Mahasim, from the Arabic المِعْصَم al-miʽşam "the wrist" (of the charioteer), which it shared with Theta Aurigae. In 2016, the IAU organized a Working Group on Star Names (WGSN) to catalog and standardize proper names for stars. The WGSN approved the names Haedus for Eta Aurigae and Saclateni for Zeta Aurigae A on 30 June 2017 and they are both now so included in the List of IAU-approved Star Names.

In Chinese, 柱 (Zhù), meaning Pillars, refers to an asterism consisting of Eta Aurigae, Epsilon Aurigae, Zeta Aurigae, Upsilon Aurigae, Nu Aurigae, Tau Aurigae, Chi Aurigae and 26 Aurigae. Consequently, the Chinese name for Eta Aurigae itself is 柱三 (Zhǔ sān, English: the Third Star of Pillars).

== Properties ==
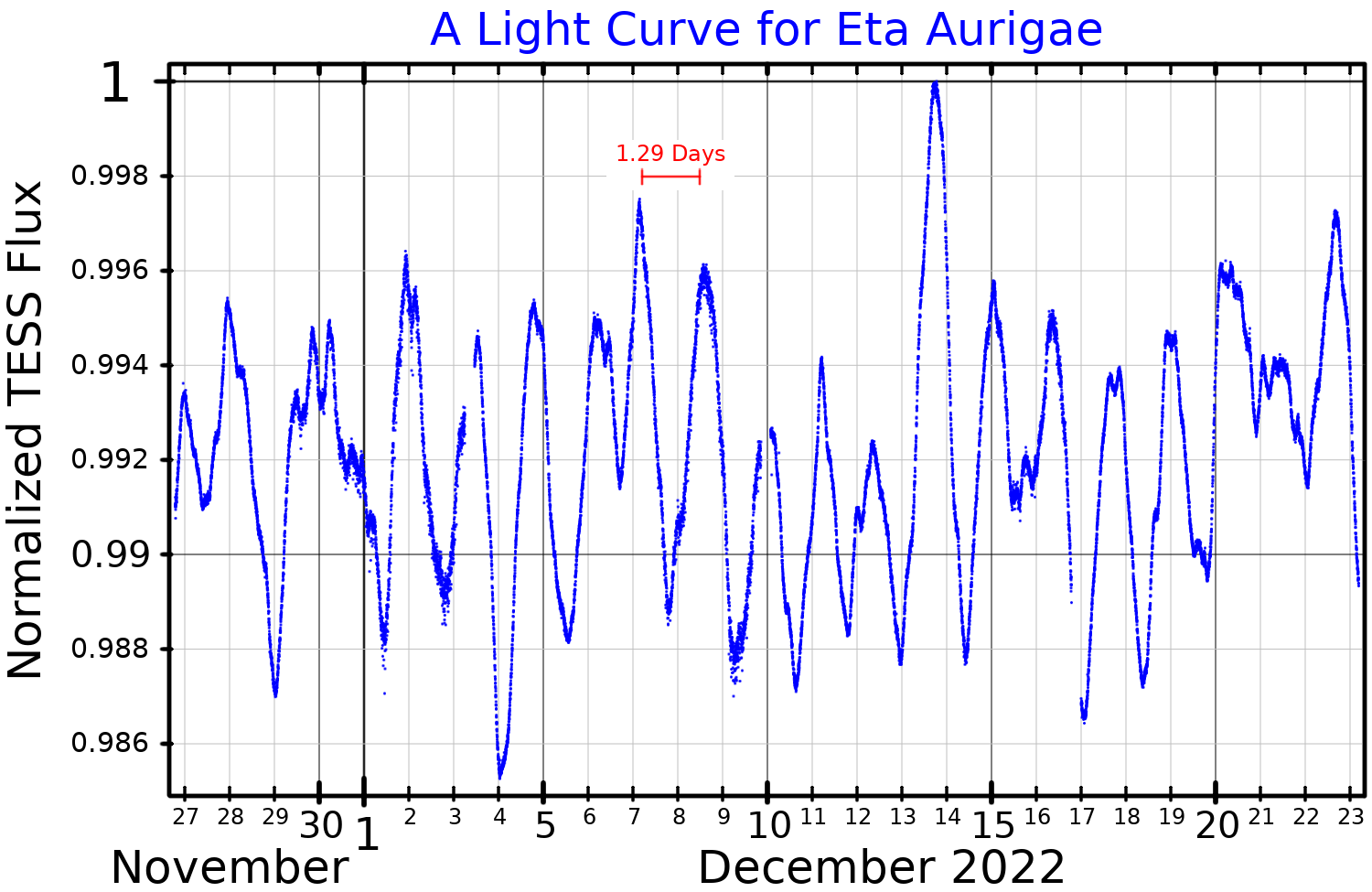
A light curve for Eta Aurigae, plotted from TESS data. The 1.29 day primary period is marked in red.

Since 1943, the spectrum of Eta Aurigae has served as one of the stable anchor points by which other stars are classified.

Eta Aurigae is larger than the Sun, with more than five times the Sun's mass and over three times its radius. The spectrum of this star matches a stellar classification of B3 V, which is a B-type main-sequence star that is generating its energy through the nuclear fusion of hydrogen at its core. It is a chemically peculiar star and a slowly pulsating B-type star with a primary period of 1.29 days. This star is radiating 1,450 times the Sun's luminosity from its photosphere at an effective temperature of 18,660 K. Based upon its projected rotational velocity of 95 km/s, it is spinning with a rotation period of only 1.8 days. Eta Aurigae is around 39 million years old.
