= Capella =

Brightest star in the constellation Auriga

- Location of Capella Aa, as the brightest star (circled)

Observation data Epoch J2000.0 Equinox J2000.0 (ICRS)
- Constellation: Auriga
- Pronunciation: /kəˈpɛlə/
- A
- Right ascension: 05^{h} 16^{m} 41.35871^{s} (Note: Pertains to the center of mass of the Capella Aa/Ab binary system. See Volume 1, The Hipparcos and Tycho Catalogues Archived 2018-09-01 at the Wayback Machine, European Space Agency, 1997, §2.3.4, and the entry Archived 2016-03-03 at the Wayback Machine in the Hipparcos catalogue (CDS ID I/239 Archived 2016-03-03 at the Wayback Machine.))
- Declination: +45° 59′ 52.7693″
- Apparent magnitude (V): +0.08 (+0.03 – +0.16)
- H
- Right ascension: 05^{h} 17^{m} 23.728^{s}
- Declination: +45° 50′ 22.97″
- Apparent magnitude (V): 10.16
- L
- Right ascension: 05^{h} 17^{m} 23.943^{s}
- Declination: +45° 50′ 19.84″
- Apparent magnitude (V): 13.7

Characteristics

A
- Spectral type: G3III:
- U−B color index: +0.44
- B−V color index: +0.80
- V−R color index: −0.3
- R−I color index: +0.44
- Variable type: RS CVn (suspected)

Aa
- Evolutionary stage: Red clump
- Spectral type: G8III

Ab
- Evolutionary stage: Subgiant
- Spectral type: G0III

H
- Evolutionary stage: Main sequence (red dwarf)
- Spectral type: M2.5 V
- U−B color index: 1.24
- B−V color index: 1.50
- R−I color index: 0.91

L
- Evolutionary stage: Main sequence (red dwarf)
- Spectral type: M4:

Astrometry

A
Radial velocity (R_{v})	+29.9387±0.0032 km/s
Proper motion (μ)	RA: 75.52 mas/yr Dec.: −427.11 mas/yr
Parallax (π)	76.20±0.46 mas
Distance	42.919±0.049 ly (13.159±0.015 pc)

Aa
Absolute magnitude (M_{V})	+0.296

Ab
Absolute magnitude (M_{V})	+0.167

HL
Radial velocity (R_{v})	31.63±0.14 km/s

H
Proper motion (μ)	RA: 88.57 mas/yr Dec.: −428.91 mas/yr
Parallax (π)	74.9521±0.0188 mas
Distance	43.52 ± 0.01 ly (13.342 ± 0.003 pc)
Absolute magnitude (M_{V})	9.53

L
Proper motion (μ)	RA: 54.1 mas/yr Dec.: −417.5 mas/yr
Parallax (π)	75.1838±0.0534 mas
Distance	43.38 ± 0.03 ly (13.301 ± 0.009 pc)
Absolute magnitude (M_{V})	13.1

Orbit
Primary	Aa
Secondary	Ab
Period (P)	104.02128±0.00016 d
Semi-major axis (a)	0.056442±0.000023" (0.74272±0.00069 AU)
Eccentricity (e)	0.00089±0.00011
Inclination (i)	137.156±0.046°
Longitude of the node (Ω)	40.522±0.039°
Periastron epoch (T)	2,448,147.6±2.6 JD
Argument of periastron (ω) (primary)	342.6±9.0 JD°
Semi-amplitude (K_{1}) (primary)	25.9611±0.0044 km/s
Semi-amplitude (K_{2}) (secondary)	26.860±0.0017 km/s

Orbit
Primary	H
Secondary	L
Period (P)	300 yr
Semi-major axis (a)	3.5" (40 AU)
Eccentricity (e)	0.75
Inclination (i)	52°
Longitude of the node (Ω)	288°
Periastron epoch (T)	2,220
Argument of periastron (ω) (secondary)	88°

Details

Aa
Mass	2.5687±0.0074 M_{☉}
Radius	11.98±0.57 R_{☉}
Luminosity (bolometric)	78.7±4.2 L_{☉}
Surface gravity (log g)	2.691±0.041 cgs
Temperature	4,970±50 K
Metallicity [Fe/H]	−0.04±0.06 dex
Rotation	104±3 days
Rotational velocity (v sin i)	4.1±0.4 km/s
Age	590–650 Myr

Ab
Mass	2.4828±0.0067 M_{☉}
Radius	8.83±0.33 R_{☉}
Luminosity (bolometric)	72.7±3.6 L_{☉}
Surface gravity (log g)	2.941±0.032 cgs
Temperature	5,730±60 K
Metallicity [Fe/H]	−0.04±0.06 dex
Rotation	8.5±0.2 days
Rotational velocity (v sin i)	35.0±0.5 km/s
Age	590–650 Myr

H
Mass	0.57 M_{☉}
Radius	0.54±0.03 R_{☉}
Luminosity (bolometric)	0.05 L_{☉}
Surface gravity (log g)	4.75±0.05 cgs
Temperature	3,700±150 K
Metallicity [Fe/H]	+0.1 dex

L
Mass	0.53 M_{☉}

Other designations
- Alhajoth, Hokulei, α Aurigae, 13 Aurigae, BD+45 1077, FK5 193, GC 6427, HD 34029, HIP 24608, HR 1708, SAO 40186, PPM 47925, ADS 3841, CCDM J05168+4559, WDS 05167+4600, LTT 11619, NLTT 14766
- A: GJ 194
- HL: GJ 195
- H: PPM 47938, G 96-29, LTT 11622, NLTT 14788, 2MASS J05172386+4550229
- L: 2MASS J05172394+4550198

Database references
SIMBAD	Capella
- Capella H
- Capella L

Capella is the brightest star in the northern constellation of Auriga. It has the Bayer designation α Aurigae, which is Latinised to Alpha Aurigae and abbreviated Alpha Aur or α Aur. Capella is the sixth-brightest star in the night sky, and the third-brightest in the northern celestial hemisphere after Arcturus and Vega. A prominent object in the northern sky, it is circumpolar to observers north of 44°N. Its name meaning "little goat" in Latin, Capella depicted the goat Amalthea that suckled Zeus in classical mythology. Capella is relatively close, at 42.9 light-years (13.2 parsecs). It is one of the brightest X-ray sources in the sky, thought to come primarily from the corona of Capella Aa.

Although it appears to be a single star to the naked eye, Capella is actually a quadruple star system consisting of two pairs of binary stars: the primary pair Capella Aa and Capella Ab, and the secondary pair Capella H and Capella L. The primaries are two bright-yellow giant stars, both of which are around 2.5 solar masses. The secondary pair, are around 10,000 astronomical units (AU) (Note: the distance between the Earth and the Sun is one astronomical unit) from the first. They are faint, small and relatively cool red dwarfs.

Capella Aa and Capella Ab have exhausted their core hydrogen, and cooled and expanded, moving off the main sequence. They are in a very tight circular orbit about 0.74 AU apart, and orbit each other every 104 days. Capella Aa is the cooler and more luminous of the two with spectral class G8III; it is 78.7±4.2 times the Sun's luminosity and 11.98±0.57 times its radius. An aging red clump star, it is fusing helium to carbon and oxygen in its core. Capella Ab is slightly smaller and hotter and of spectral class G0III; it is 72.7±3.6 times as luminous as the Sun and 8.83±0.33 times its radius. It is in the Hertzsprung gap, corresponding to a brief subgiant evolutionary phase as it expands and cools to become a red giant. Several other stars in the same visual field have been catalogued as companions but are physically unrelated.

== Nomenclature ==
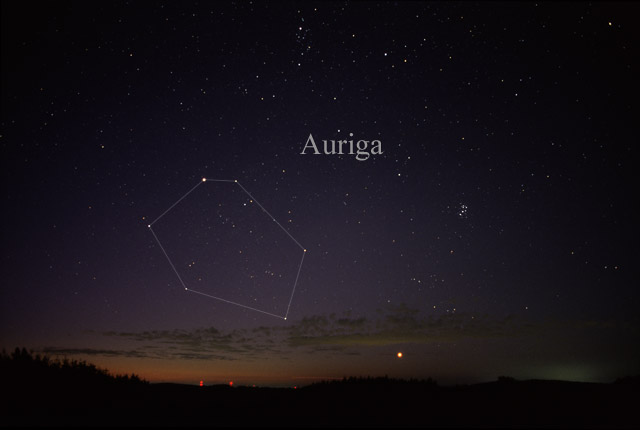
Capella is the brightest star in the constellation of Auriga (upper left).

α Aurigae (Latinised to Alpha Aurigae) is the star system's Bayer designation. It also has the Flamsteed designation 13 Aurigae. It is listed in several multiple star catalogues as ADS 3841, CCDM J05168+4559, and WDS J05167+4600. As a relatively nearby star system, Capella is listed in the Gliese-Jahreiss Catalogue with designations GJ 194 for the bright pair of giants and GJ 195 for the faint pair of red dwarfs.

The traditional name Capella is Latin for (small) female goat; the alternative name Capra was more commonly used in classical times. It is the translation of the Greek star name Aἴξ (aix) meaning "the Goat". As the sound of the Greek term for the goat (aἴξ) is similar to the sound of the name for the Aegaean Sea, this star has been used for weather rules and determining the seasonal wind direction. In 2016, the International Astronomical Union organized a Working Group on Star Names (WGSN) to catalogue and standardize proper names for stars. The WGSN's first bulletin of July 2016 included a table of the first two batches of names approved by the WGSN; which included Capella for this star. It is now so entered in the IAU Catalog of Star Names. The catalogue of star names lists Capella as applying to the star α Aurigae Aa.

== Observational history ==
Capella was the brightest star in the night sky from 210,000 years ago to 160,000 years ago, at about −1.8 in apparent magnitude. At −1.1, Aldebaran was brightest before this period; it and Capella were situated rather close to each other in the sky and approximated boreal pole stars at the time.

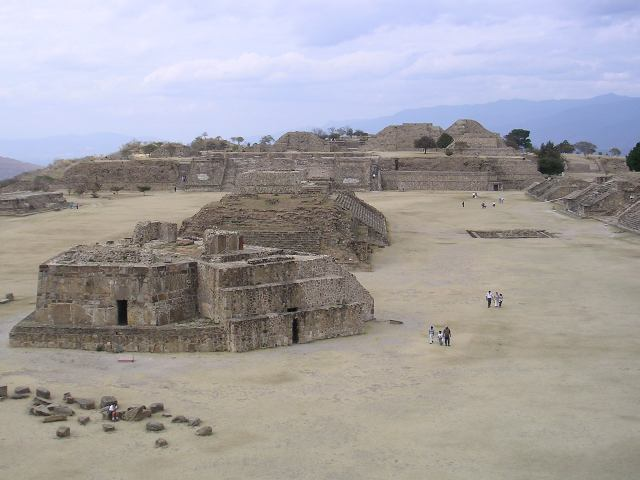
Building J (foreground) at Monte Albán

Capella is thought to be mentioned in an Akkadian inscription dating to the 20th century BC. Its goat-associated symbolism dates back to Mesopotamia as a constellation called "GAM", "Gamlum" or "MUL.GAM" in the 7th-century BC document MUL.APIN. GAM represented a scimitar or crook and may have represented the star alone or the constellation of Auriga as a whole. Later, Bedouin astronomers created constellations that were groups of animals, where each star represented one animal. The stars of Auriga comprised a herd of goats, an association also present in Greek mythology. It is sometimes called the Shepherd's Star in English literature. Capella was seen as a portent of rain in classical times.

Building J of the pre-Columbian site Monte Albán in Oaxaca state in Mexico was built around 275 BC, at a different orientation to other structures in the complex. Its steps are aligned perpendicular to the rising of Capella at that time, so that a person looking out a doorway on the building would have faced it directly. Capella is significant as its heliacal rising took place within a day of the Sun passing directly overhead over Monte Albán.

=== Multiple status ===
Professor William Wallace Campbell of the Lick Observatory announced that Capella was binary in 1899, based on spectroscopic observations—he noted on photographic plates taken from August 1896 to February 1897 that a second spectrum appeared superimposed over the first, and that there was a doppler shift to violet in September and October and to red in November and February—showing that the components were moving toward and away from the Earth (and hence orbiting each other). Almost simultaneously, British astronomer Hugh Newall had observed its composite spectrum with a four prism spectroscope attached to a 25-inch (64 cm) telescope at Cambridge in July 1899, concluding that it was a binary star system.

Many observers tried to discern the component stars without success. Known as "The Interferometrist's Friend", it was first resolved interferometrically in 1919 by John Anderson and Francis Pease at Mount Wilson Observatory, who published an orbit in 1920 based on their observations. This was the first interferometric measurement of any object outside the Solar System. A high-precision orbit was published in 1994 based on observations by the Mark III Stellar Interferometer, again at Mount Wilson Observatory. Capella also became the first astronomical object to be imaged by a separate element optical interferometer when it was imaged by the Cambridge Optical Aperture Synthesis Telescope in September 1995.

In 1914, Finnish astronomer Ragnar Furuhjelm observed that the spectroscopic binary had a faint companion star, which, as its proper motion was similar to that of the spectroscopic binary, was probably physically bound to it. In February 1936, Carl L. Stearns observed that this companion appeared to be double itself; this was confirmed in September that year by Gerard Kuiper. This pair are designated Capella H and L.

=== X-ray source ===
Two Aerobee-Hi rocket flights on September 20, 1962, and March 15, 1963, detected and confirmed an X-ray source in Auriga at RA 05^{h} 09^{m} Dec +45°, identified as Capella. A major milestone in stellar X-ray astronomy happened on April 5, 1974, with the detection of the strongest emission of X-rays up to that time from Capella, measured at more than 10,000 times the x-ray luminosity of the Sun. A rocket flight on that date briefly calibrated its attitude control system when a star sensor pointed the payload axis at Capella. During this period, X-rays in the range 0.2–1.6 keV were detected by an X-ray reflector system co-aligned with the star sensor.

The X-ray luminosity (L_{x}) of ~10^{24} W (10^{31} erg/s) is four orders of magnitude above the Sun's X-ray luminosity. Capella's X-rays are thought to be primarily from the corona of the most massive star. Capella is ROSAT X-ray source 1RXS J051642.2+460001. The high temperature of Capella's corona as obtained from the first coronal X-ray spectrum of Capella using HEAO 1 would require magnetic confinement, unless it is a free-flowing coronal wind.

== Observation ==
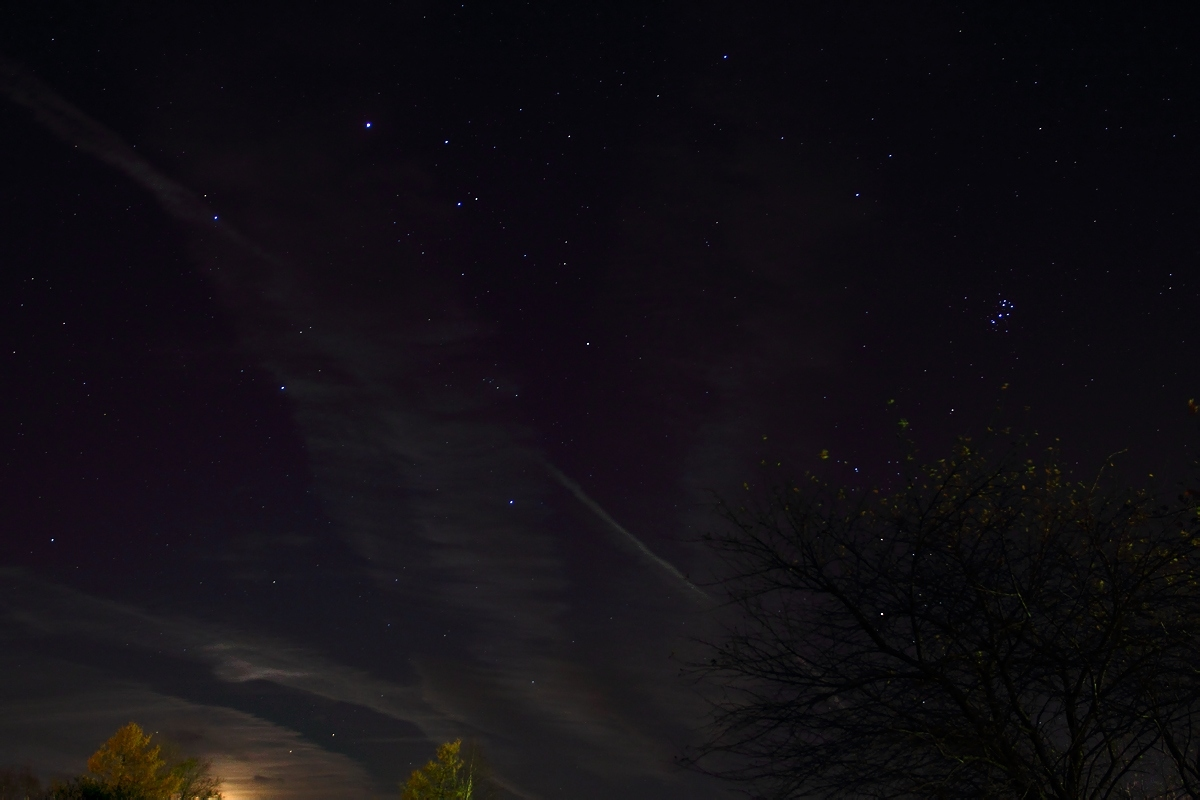
Annotated night sky image showing Auriga and the Pleiades—Capella is the brightest star, towards top left

With an average apparent magnitude of +0.08, Capella is the brightest object in the constellation Auriga, the sixth-brightest star in the night sky, the third-brightest in the northern celestial hemisphere (after Arcturus and Vega), and the fourth-brightest visible to the naked eye from the latitude 40°N. It appears to be a rich yellowish-white colour, although the yellow colour is more apparent during daylight observation with a telescope, due to the contrast against the blue sky.

Capella is closer to the north celestial pole than any other first-magnitude star. (Note: Polaris is only second magnitude.) Its northern declination is such that it is actually invisible south of latitude 44°S—this includes southernmost New Zealand, Argentina and Chile as well as the Falkland Islands. Conversely it is circumpolar north of 44°N: for the whole of the United Kingdom and Canada (except for part of Southern Ontario), most of Europe, and the northernmost fringes of the contiguous United States, the star never sets. Capella and Vega are on opposite sides of the pole, at about the same distance from it, such that an imaginary line between the two stars will nearly pass through Polaris. Visible halfway between Orion's Belt and Polaris, Capella is at its highest in the night sky at midnight in early December and is regarded as a prominent star of the northern winter sky.

A few degrees to the southwest of Capella lie three stars, Epsilon Aurigae, Zeta Aurigae and Eta Aurigae, the latter two of which are known as "The Kids", or Haedi. The four form a familiar pattern, or asterism, in the sky.

== Distance ==
Based on an annual parallax shift of 76.20 milliarcseconds (with a margin of error of 0.46 milliarcseconds) as measured by the Hipparcos satellite, this system is estimated to be 42.8 light-years (13.12 parsecs) from Earth, with a margin of error of 0.3 light-year (0.09 parsec). An alternative method to determine the distance is via the orbital parallax, which gives a distance of 42.92 light-years (13.159 parsecs) with a margin of error of only 0.1%. Capella is estimated to have been a little closer to the Solar System in the past, passing within 29 light-years distant around 237,000 years ago. At this range, it would have shone at apparent magnitude −0.82, comparable to Canopus today.

In a 1960 paper, American astronomer Olin J. Eggen concluded that Capella was a member of the Hyades moving group, a group of stars moving in the same direction as the Hyades cluster, after analysing its proper motion and parallax. Members of the group are of a similar age, and those that are around 2.5 times as massive as the Sun have moved off the main sequence after exhausting their core hydrogen reserves and are expanding and cooling into red giants.

== Stellar system ==
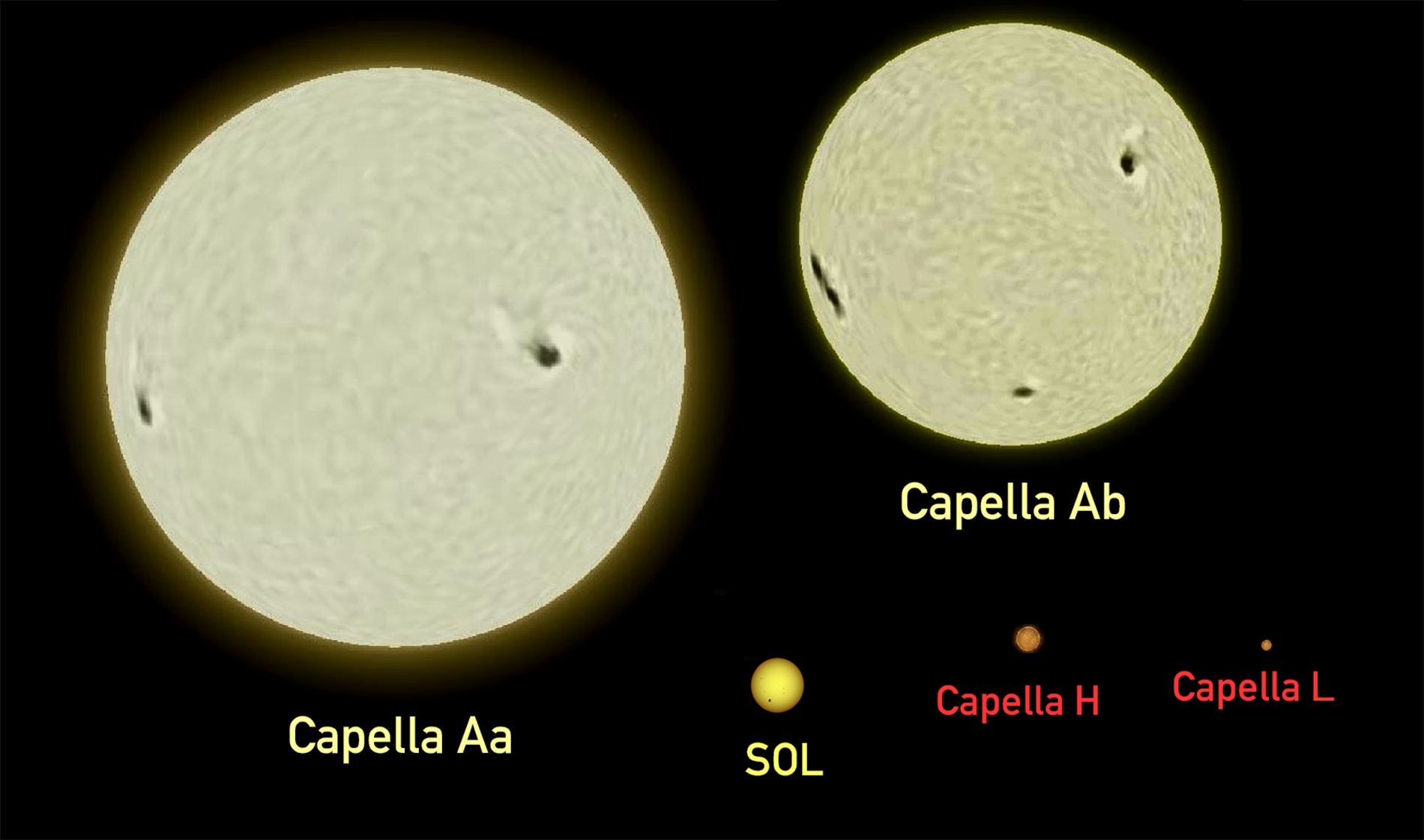
Capella components compared with the Sun

There are several stars within a few arcminutes of Capella and some have been listed as companions in various multiple star catalogues. The Washington Double Star Catalog lists components A, B, C, D, E, F, G, H, I, L, M, N, O, P, Q, and R, with A being the naked-eye star. Most are only line-of-sight companions, but the close pair of red dwarfs H and L are at the same distance as the bright component A and moving through space along with it. Capella A is itself a spectroscopic binary with components Aa and Ab, both giant stars. The pair of giants is separated from the pair of red dwarfs by 723".

American astronomer Robert Burnham Jr. described a scale model of the system where Capella A was represented by spheres 13 and 7 inches across, separated by ten feet. The red dwarfs were then each 0.7 inch across and they were separated by 420 feet. At this scale, the two pairs are 21 miles apart.

=== Capella A ===
Hertzsprung–Russell diagram showing an evolutionary track for a star of approximately the mass of the two Capella giants. The current states of Capella Aa and Ab are marked.

Capella A consists of two yellow evolved stars that have been calculated to orbit each other every 104.02128±0.00016 days, with a semimajor axis of 111.11±0.10 million km (0.74272±0.00069 AU), roughly the distance between Venus and the Sun. The pair is not an eclipsing binary—that is, as seen from Earth, neither star passes in front of the other. The orbit is known extremely accurately and can be used to derive an orbital parallax with far better precision than the one measured directly. The stars are not near enough to each other for the Roche lobe of either star to have been filled and any significant mass transfer to have taken place, even during the red giant stage of the primary star.

Modern convention designates the more luminous cooler star as component Aa and its spectral type has been usually measured between G2 and K0. The hotter secondary Ab has been given various spectral types of late (cooler) G or early (warmer) F. The MK spectral types of the two stars have been measured a number of times, and they are both consistently assigned a luminosity class of III indicating a giant star. The composite spectrum appears to be dominated by the primary star due to its sharper absorption lines; the lines from the secondary are broadened and blurred by its rapid rotation. The composite spectral class is given as approximately G3III, but with a specific mention of features due to a cooler component. The most recent specific published types are K0III and G1III, although older values are still widely quoted such as G5IIIe + G0III from the Bright Star Catalogue or G8III + G0III by Eggen. Where the context is clear, these two components have been referred to as A and B.

The individual apparent magnitudes of the two component stars cannot be directly measured, but their relative brightness has been measured at various wavelengths. They have very nearly equal brightness in the visible light spectrum, with the hotter secondary component generally being found to be a few tenths of a magnitude brighter. A 2016 measurement gives the magnitude difference between the two stars at a wavelength of 700 nm as 0.00±0.1.

The physical properties of the two stars can be determined with high accuracy. The masses are derived directly from the orbital solution, with Aa being 2.5687±0.0074 M_{☉} and Ab being 2.4828±0.0067 M_{☉}. Their angular radii have been directly measured; in combination with the very accurate distance, this gives 11.98±0.57 R_{☉} and 8.83±0.33 R_{☉} for Aa and Ab, respectively. Their surface temperatures can be calculated by comparison of observed and synthetic spectra, direct measurement of their angular diameters and brightnesses, calibration against their observed colour indices, and disentangling of high resolution spectra. Weighted averages of these four methods give 4,970±50 K for Aa and 5,730±60 K for Ab. Their bolometric luminosities are most accurately derived from their apparent magnitudes and bolometric corrections, but are confirmed by calculation from the temperatures and radii of the stars. Aa is 78.7±4.2 times as luminous as the Sun and Ab 72.7±3.6 times as luminous, so the star defined as the primary component is the more luminous when all wavelengths are considered but very slightly less bright at visual wavelengths.

Estimated to be 590 to 650 million years old, the stars were probably at the hot end of spectral class A during their main-sequence lifetime, similar to Vega. They have now exhausted their core hydrogen and evolved off the main sequence, their outer layers expanding and cooling. Despite the giant luminosity class, the secondary component is very clearly within the Hertzsprung gap on the Hertzsprung–Russell diagram, still expanding and cooling towards the red giant branch, making it a subgiant in evolutionary terms. The more massive primary has already passed through this stage, when it reached a maximum radius of 36 to 38 times that of the Sun. It is now a red clump star which is fusing helium to carbon and oxygen in its core, a process that has not yet begun for the less massive star. Detailed analysis shows that it is nearing the end of this stage and starting to expand again which will lead it to the asymptotic giant branch. Isotope abundances (Note: The lithium abundance, C_{12}/C_{13} ratio and C/N ratio have all declined in Capella Aa but not in Capella Ab.) and spin rates confirm this evolutionary difference between the two stars. Heavy element abundances are broadly comparable to those of the Sun and the overall metallicity is slightly less than the Sun's.

The rotational period of each star can be measured by observing periodic variations in the doppler shifts of their spectral lines. The absolute rotational velocities of the two stars are known from their inclinations, rotation periods, and sizes, but the projected equatorial rotational velocities measured using doppler broadening of spectral lines are a standard measure and these are generally quoted. Capella Aa has a projected rotational velocity of 4.1±0.4 km/s, taking 104±3 days to complete one rotation, while Capella Ab spins much more rapidly at 35.0±0.5 km/s, completing a full rotation in only 8.5±0.2 days. Rotational braking occurs in all stars when they expand into giants, and binary stars are also tidally braked. Capella Aa has slowed until it is rotationally locked to the orbital period, although theory predicts that it should still be rotating more quickly from a starting point of a rapidly-spinning main sequence A star.

Capella has long been suspected to be slightly variable. Its amplitude of about 0.1 magnitudes means that it may at times be brighter or fainter than Rigel, Betelgeuse and Vega, which are also variable. The system has been classified as an RS Canum Venaticorum variable, a class of binary stars with active chromospheres that cause huge starspots, but it is still only listed as a suspected variable in the General Catalogue of Variable Stars. Unusually for RS CVn systems, the hotter star, Capella Ab, has the more active atmosphere because it is located in the Hertzsprung gap—a stage where it is changing its angular momentum and deepening its convection zone.

The active atmospheres and closeness of these stars means that they are among the brightest X-ray sources in the sky. However the X-ray emission is due to stable coronal structures and not eruptive flaring activity. Coronal loops larger than the Sun and with temperatures of several million kelvin are likely to be responsible for the majority of the X-rays.

=== Capella HL ===
The seventh companion published for Capella, component H, is physically associated with the bright primary star. It is a red dwarf separated from the pair of G-type giants by a distance of around 10,000 AU. It has its own close companion, an even fainter red dwarf that was 1.8″ away when it was discovered in 1935. It is component L in double star catalogues. In 2015 the separation had increased to 3.5″, which was sufficient to allow tentative orbital parameters to be derived, 80 years after its discovery. The Gliese-Jahreiss Catalogue of nearby stars designates the binary system as GJ 195. The two components are then referred to individually as GJ 195 A and B.

The two stars are reported to have a 3.5-visual-magnitude difference (2.3 mag in the passband of the Gaia spacecraft) although the difference is much smaller at infrared wavelengths. This is unexpected and may indicate further unseen companions.

The mass of the stars can, in principle, be determined from the orbital motion, but uncertainties in the orbit have led to widely varying results. In 1975, an eccentric 388-year orbit gave masses of 0.65 M_{☉} and 0.13 M_{☉}. A smaller near-circular orbit published in 2015 had a 300-year orbit, benefitting from mass constraints of 0.57 M_{☉} and 0.53 M_{☉}, respectively, for GJ 195 A and B, based on their infrared magnitudes.

=== Visual companions ===
Six visual companions to Capella were discovered before Capella H and are generally known only as Capella B through G. None are thought to be physically associated with Capella, although all appear closer in the sky than the HL pair.

Multiple/double star designation: WDS 05167+4600
Component	Primary	Right ascension (α) Equinox J2000.0	Declination (δ) Equinox J2000.0	Epoch of observed separation	Angular distance from primary	Position angle (relative to primary)	Apparent magnitude (V)	Database reference
B	A	05^{h} 16^{m} 42.7^{s}	+46° 00′ 55″	1898	46.6″	23°	17.1	
C	A	05^{h} 16^{m} 35.9^{s}	+46° 01′ 12″	1878	78.2″	318°	15.1	
D	A	05^{h} 16^{m} 40.1^{s}	+45° 58′ 07″	1878	126.2″	183°	13.6	
E	A	05^{h} 16.5^{m}	+46° 02′	1908	154.1″	319°	12.1	
F	A	05^{h} 16^{m} 48.748^{s}	+45° 58′ 30.84″	1999	112.0″	137°	10.21	SIMBAD
G	A	05^{h} 16^{m} 31.852^{s}	+46° 08′ 27.42″	2003	522.4″	349°	8.10	SIMBAD

Component B is passing through the Hertzsprung gap and cooling down to a yellow giant; Capella A has recently reached the end of this process.

Component F is also known as TYC 3358-3142-1. It is listed with a spectral type of K although it is included in a catalogue of OB stars as a distant luminous star.

Component G is BD+45 1076, with a spectral type of F0, at a distance of 401 light-years (123 parsecs). It is identified as a variable member of the Guide Star Catalogue from Chandra observations although it is not known what type of variability. It is known to be an X-ray source with an active corona.

Several other stars have also been catalogued as companions to Capella. Components I, Q and R are 13th-magnitude stars at distances of 92″, 133″ and 134″. V538 Aurigae and its close companion HD 233153 are red dwarfs ten degrees away from Capella; they have very similar space motions but the small difference makes it possible that this is just a coincidence. Two faint stars have been discovered by speckle imaging in the Capella HL field, around 10″ distant from that pair. These have been catalogued as Capella O and P. It is not known whether they are physically associated with the red dwarf binary.

== Etymology and culture ==
Capella traditionally marks the left shoulder of the constellation's eponymous charioteer, or, according to the 2nd-century astronomer Ptolemy's Almagest, the goat that the charioteer is carrying. In Bayer's 1603 work Uranometria, Capella marks the charioteer's back. The two Haedi had been identified as a separate constellation by Pliny the Elder and Manilius, and were called Capra, Caper, or Hircus, all of which relate to its status as the "goat star". Ptolemy merged the Charioteer and the Goats in the 2nd-century Almagest.

In Greek mythology, the star represented the goat Amalthea that suckled Zeus. It was this goat whose horn, after accidentally being broken off by Zeus, was transformed into the cornucopia, or "horn of plenty", which would be filled with whatever its owner desired. Though most often associated with Amalthea, Capella has sometimes been associated with Amalthea's owner, a nymph. The myth of the nymph says that the goat's hideous appearance, resembling a Gorgon, was partially responsible for the Titans' defeat, after Zeus skinned the goat and wore it as his aegis.

In medieval accounts, it bore the uncommon name Alhajoth (also spelled Alhaior, Althaiot, Alhaiset, Alhatod, Alhojet, Alanac, Alanat, Alioc), which (especially the last) may be a corruption of its Arabic name, العيوق, al-^{c}ayyūq. ^{c}Ayyūq has no clear significance in Arabic, but may be an Arabized form of the Greek αίξ aiks "goat"; cf. the modern Greek Αίγα Aiga, the feminine of goat. To the Bedouin of the Negev and Sinai, Capella al-'Ayyūq ath-Thurayyā "Capella of the Pleiades", from its role as pointing out the position of that asterism. Another name in Arabic was Al-Rākib "the driver", a translation of the Greek.

To the ancient Balts, Capella was known as Perkūno Ožka "Thunder's Goat", or Tikutis. Conversely in Slavic Macedonian folklore, Capella was Jastreb "the hawk", flying high above and ready to pounce on Mother Hen (the Pleiades) and the Rooster (Nath).

Astrologically, Capella portends civic and military honors and wealth. In the Middle Ages, it was considered a Behenian fixed star, with the stone sapphire and the plants horehound, mint, mugwort and mandrake as attributes. Cornelius Agrippa listed its kabbalistic sign with the name Hircus (Latin for goat).

In Hindu mythology, Capella was seen as the heart of Brahma, Brahma Hṛdaya. In traditional Chinese astronomy, Capella was part of the asterism 五車 (Wŭ chē; English: Five Chariots), which consisted of Capella together with Beta Aurigae, Theta Aurigae and Iota Aurigae, as well as Beta Tauri. Since it was the second star in this asterism, it has the Chinese name 五車二 (Wŭ chē èr; English: Second of the Five Chariots). Capella's name in the Persian astronomy is "Soroush".

In Quechua it was known as Colça; the Incas held the star in high regard. The Hawaiians saw Capella as part of an asterism Ke Kā o Makaliʻi ("The canoe bailer of Makali'i") that helped them navigate at sea. Called Hoku-lei "star wreath" (or "star that rises like a cloud"), it formed this asterism with Procyon, Sirius, Castor and Pollux. In Tahitian folklore, Capella was Tahi-ari'i, the wife of Fa'a-nui (Auriga) and mother of prince Ta'urua (Venus) who sails his canoe across the sky. In the Marshall Islands, this star is Lōktañūr, the mother of ten sons represented by other stars.

In Inuit astronomy, Capella, along with Menkalinan (Beta Aurigae), Pollux (Beta Geminorum) and Castor (Alpha Geminorum), formed a constellation Quturjuuk, "collar-bones", the two pairs of stars denoting a bone each. Used for navigation and time-keeping at night, the constellation was recognised from Alaska to western Greenland. The Gwich'in saw Capella and Menkalinan has forming shreets'ą įį vidzee, the right ear of the large circumpolar constellation Yahdii, which covered much of the night sky, and whose orientation facilitated navigation and timekeeping.

In Australian Aboriginal mythology for the Boorong people of Victoria, Capella was Purra, the kangaroo, pursued and killed by the nearby Gemini twins, Yurree (Castor) and Wanjel (Pollux). The Wardaman people of northern Australia knew the star as Yagalal, a ceremonial fish scale, related to Guwamba the barramundi (Aldebaran).

=== Namesakes ===
- USS Capella (AK-13) and USNS Capella (T-AKR-293), both U.S. Navy ships
- Mazda Capella, a model of automobile manufactured by Mazda

== See also ==
- List of brightest stars
- List of nearest bright stars
- Historical brightest stars
- List of nearest giant stars

== Sources ==
- Allen, Richard Hinckley (2013) [1899]. Star Names: Their Lore and Meaning (Reprint ed.). Courier Corporation. ISBN 978-0-486-13766-7.
- Burnham, Robert Jr. (1978). Burnham's Celestial Handbook: An Observer's Guide to the Universe Beyond the Solar System, Volume One: Andromeda-Cetus (Revised & Enlarged ed.). Dover Publications. ISBN 978-0-486-23567-7.
- Ridpath, Ian; Tirion, Wil (2001). Stars and Planets Guide. Princeton University Press. ISBN 978-0-691-08913-3.
- Brosch, Noah (2008). Sirius Matters. Springer Science & Business Media. ISBN 978-1-4020-8319-8.
- Schaaf, Fred (2008). The Brightest Stars: Discovering the Universe through the Sky's Most Brilliant Stars. Wiley. ISBN 978-0-470-24917-8.
- Winterburn, Emily (2009). The Stargazer's Guide: How to Read Our Night Sky. Harper Perennial. ISBN 978-0-06-178969-4.
