= Beta Tauri =

Star in the constellation Taurus

β Tauri
- Location of β Tauri in Taurus (circled)

Observation data Epoch J2000 Equinox ICRS
- Constellation: Taurus
- Pronunciation: /ɛlˈnæθ/ or /ˈɛlnæθ/
- Right ascension: 05^{h} 26^{m} 17.51312^{s}
- Declination: +28° 36′ 26.8262″
- Apparent magnitude (V): 1.65

Characteristics
- Spectral type: B7III
- U−B color index: −0.49
- B−V color index: −0.13

Astrometry
Radial velocity (R_{v})	9.2 km/s
Proper motion (μ)	RA: +22.76 mas/yr Dec.: −173.58 mas/yr
Parallax (π)	24.36±0.34 mas
Distance	134 ± 2 ly (41.1 ± 0.6 pc)
Absolute magnitude (M_{V})	−1.42

Details
Mass	5.0±0.1 M_{☉}
Radius	4.79±0.13 R_{☉}
Luminosity	564±20 L_{☉}
Surface gravity (log g)	3.63 cgs
Temperature	13,600±100 K
Metallicity [Fe/H]	+0.2 dex
Rotational velocity (v sin i)	59 km/s
Age	100±10 Myr

Other designations
- Elnath, El Nath, Alnath, β Tauri, Gamma Aurigae, 112 Tauri, BD+28°795, FK5 202, GC 6681, HD 35497, HIP 25428, HR 1791, SAO 77168, CCDM 05263+2836, WDS J05263+2836A

Database references
SIMBAD	data

Beta Tauri is the second-brightest star in the constellation of Taurus. It has the official name Elnath; Beta Tauri is the current Bayer designation, which is Latinised from β Tauri and abbreviated Beta Tau or β Tau. The original designation of Gamma Aurigae is now rarely used. It is a chemically peculiar B7 giant star, 134 light years away from the Sun with an apparent magnitude of 1.65.

== Nomenclature ==
This star has two Bayer designations: β Tauri (Latinised to Beta Tauri) and γ Aurigae (Latinised to Gamma Aurigae). Ptolemy considered the star to be shared by Auriga, and Johann Bayer assigned it a designation in both constellations. When the modern constellation boundaries were fixed in 1930, the designation γ Aurigae largely dropped from use.

The traditional name Elnath, variously El Nath or Alnath, comes from the Arabic word النطح an-naţħ, meaning "the butting" (i.e. the bull's horns). As in many other Arabic star names, the article ال is transliterated literally as el, yet overwhelmingly in Arabic pronunciation it is assimilated to the n, meaning it is omitted. In 2016, the International Astronomical Union organized a Working Group on Star Names (WGSN) to catalog and standardize proper names for stars. The WGSN's first bulletin of July 2016 included a table of the first two batches of names approved by the WGSN; which included Elnath for this star.

In Chinese, 五車 (Wǔ Chē), meaning Five Chariots, refers to an asterism consisting of β Tauri, ι Aurigae, Capella, β Aurigae and θ Aurigae. Consequently, the Chinese name for β Tauri itself is 五車五 (Wǔ Chē Wǔ; English: Fifth of the Five Chariots.)

== Physical properties ==
The absolute magnitude of Beta Tauri is −1.34, similar to another star in Taurus, Maia in the Pleiades star cluster. Like Maia, β Tauri is a B-class giant with a luminosity 700 times solar (L_{☉}). It has evolved to become a giant star, larger and cooler than when it was on the main sequence. However, being approximately 130 light-years distant compared to Maia's estimated 360 light-years, β Tauri ranks as the second-brightest star in the constellation.

It is a mercury-manganese star, a type of non-magnetic chemically peculiar star with unusually large signatures of some heavy elements in its spectrum. Relative to the Sun, β Tauri is notable for a high abundance of manganese, but little calcium and magnesium. However, the lack of strong mercury signatures, together with notably high levels of silicon and chromium, have led some authors to give other classifications, including as a "SrCrEu star" or even an Ap star. Its limb-darkened angular diameter has been measured at 1.085±0.026 mas. At a distance of 41.1 pc, this corresponds to a linear radius of 4.79±0.13 R_{☉}.

At the southern edge of the narrow plane of the Milky Way Galaxy a few degrees west of the galactic anticenter, β Tauri figures (appears) as a foreground object south of many nebulae and star clusters such as M36, M37, and M38. It is 5.39 degrees north of the ecliptic, still few enough to be occultable by the Moon. Such occultations occur when the Moon's ascending node is near the March equinox, as in 2007. Most are visible only in the Southern Hemisphere, because the star is at the northern edge of the lunar occultation zone – but rarely as far north as southern California.

== Companions ==
A faint star is, angularly from our viewpoint, close enough for astronomers to consider, and guides to mention, the pair as a double star. This visual companion, BD+28°795B, has a position angle of 239 degrees and is separated from the main star by 33.4 arcseconds (″). Six angularly closer, even fainter stars have been found in a search for brown dwarf and planetary companions – all considered background objects.

A very close companion was reported from lunar occultation measurements at a distance of 0.1″, but not confirmed by other observers. Radial velocity measurements indicate that Beta Tauri is a single-lined spectroscopic binary, but there is no published information about the companion or orbit.
