= T Aurigae =

Nova seen in 1891

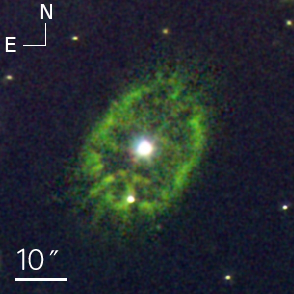
- RGB composite color image of the shell surrounding the nova T Aurigae, made from three narrow band images: Blue = 4800Å, green = Hα at 6563 Å and red = [NII] at 6583 Å. From Santamaria et al. 2020

Observation data Epoch J2000.0 Equinox J2000.0 (ICRS)
- Constellation: Auriga
- Right ascension: 05^{h} 31^{m} 59.118^{s}
- Declination: +30° 26′ 45.03″
- Apparent magnitude (V): 4.5Max. 15Min.

Astrometry
Proper motion (μ)	RA: 1.326±0.041 mas/yr Dec.: −6.386±0.029 mas/yr
Parallax (π)	1.1940±0.0388 mas
Distance	880+46 −35 pc

Characteristics
- Apparent magnitude (G): 15.12
- Variable type: Classical Nova, Eclipsing Binary

Other designations
- Nova Aur 1891, GCRV 56251, Lan 652, SBC9 326, BD+30° 923a, HD 36294, CDS 507, HR 1841, AAVSO 0525+30, Gaia DR2 3446266197646225536, Gaia DR3 3446266197646225536

Database references
SIMBAD	data

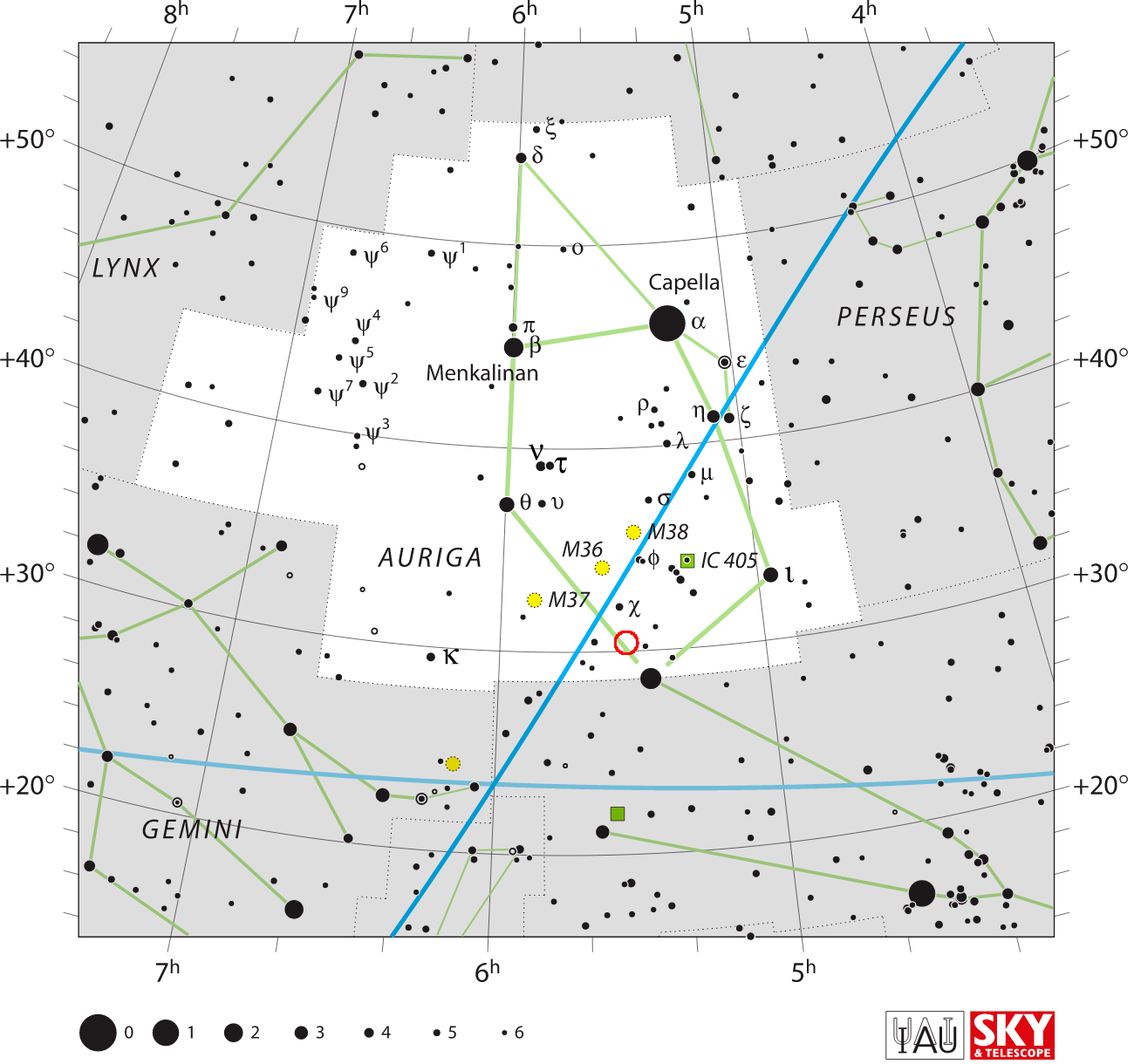
Location of T Aurigae (circled in red)

T Aurigae (or Nova Aurigae 1891) was a nova, which lit up in the constellation Auriga in 1891. Thomas David Anderson, an amateur astronomer in Edinburgh, reported that he was "almost certain" he saw the nova at 02:00 UT on 24 January 1892, when it was slightly brighter than χ Aurigae (apparent magnitude 4.74). He mistook the star for 26 Aurigae, although he noted to himself that it seemed brighter than he remembered it being. He saw it twice more during the following week. On 31 January 1892 he realized his mistake, and wrote a note to Ralph Copeland (the Astronomer Royal of Scotland) reporting his discovery. Professor Copeland immediately reported the discovery via telegram to William Huggins, who made the first spectroscopic observations of T Aurigae on 2 February 1892, when the star was a magnitude 4.5 object. T Aurigae was the first nova to be observed spectroscopically.

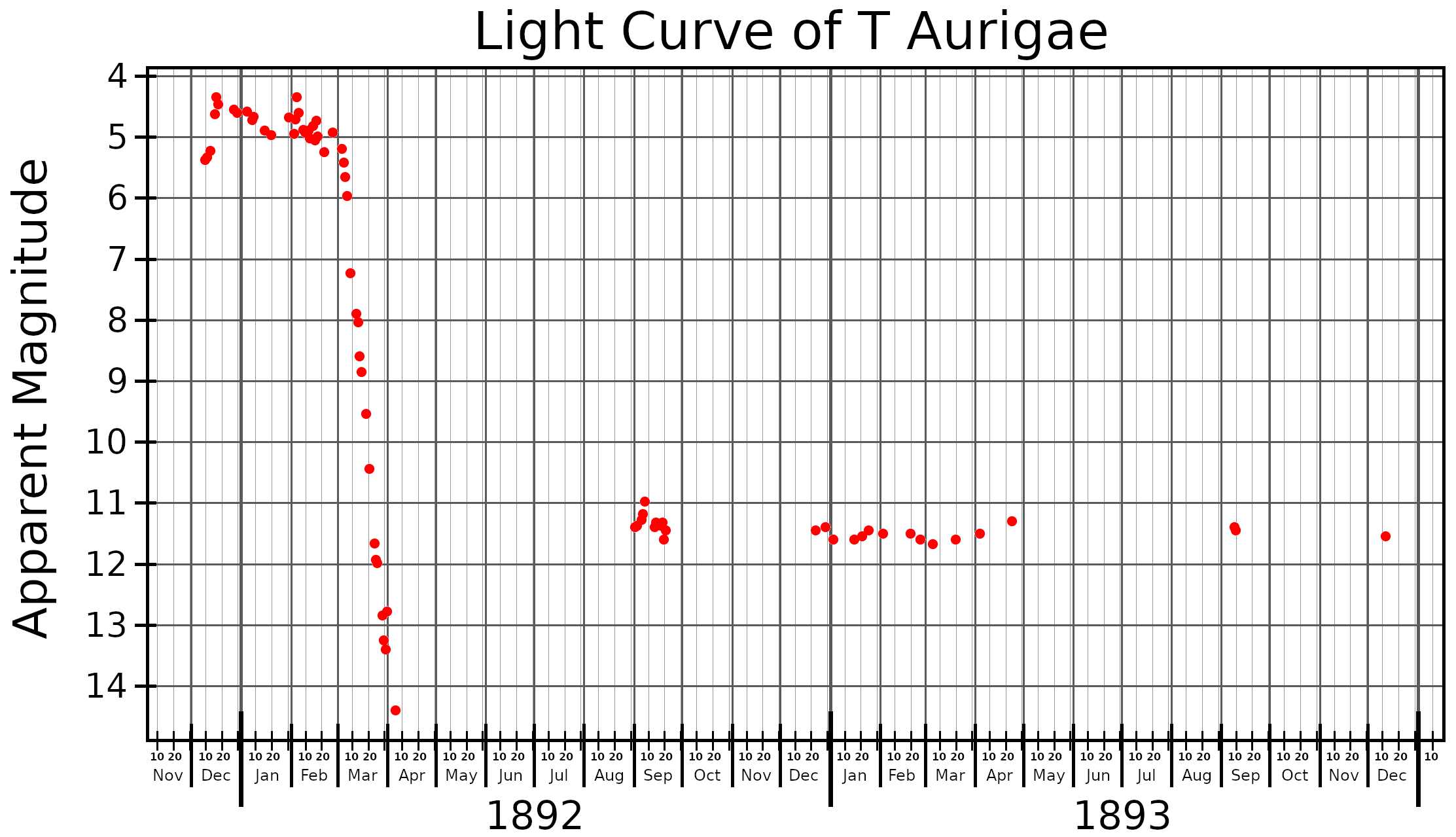
The light curve of T Aurigae, plotted from photographic magnitude data tabulated by Shapley. Data values listed with identical times were averaged before being plotted.

Strope and Schaefer report that the peak brightness of T Aurigae was magnitude 4.5,. Pre-discovery images on photographic plates allowed a light curve beginning in late 1891 to be constructed. AAVSO data shows that T Aurigae's quiescent magnitude is 15.3.

In 1958 observations of the stars forming T Aurigae with the Crossley telescope showed that it is an eclipsing binary, with a period of 4.9 hours, and an eclipse depth of 0.18 magnitudes. T Aurigae was the third nova that was discovered to be a short-period eclipsing binary, and that discovery led to increased speculation that the nova phenomenon was connected to close binary star pairs. Today it is believed that all novae are binary stars, with a "donor" star orbiting a white dwarf. The stars are so close to each other that matter is transferred from the donor star to the white dwarf.

== Nebula ==
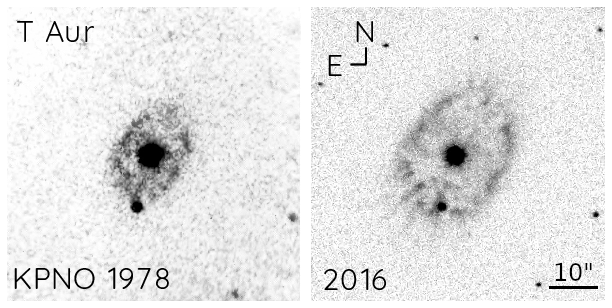
Two images of the shell surrounding T Aurigae taken 38 years apart, showing the nebula's expansion. Both were taken with Hα filters, left at the Kitt Peak National Observatory, and right with the Nordic Optical Telescope.

T Aurigae is surrounded by an emission nebula (shell) which is roughly elliptical (25 arc seconds by 19 arc seconds in size) and resembles a planetary nebula. Its 3-dimensional shape is similar to a prolate ellipsoid, but it has a central waist, making it shaped somewhat like a peanut. Santamaria et al. obtained images of this shell from 2016 through 2019 and by comparing those images to archival images dating back to 1956, they were able to determine that the shell is expanding at about 0.01 arc seconds per year, corresponding to an expansion velocity of about 350 km/sec.
