= HD 32188 =

Star in the constellation Auriga

- Location of HD 32188 (circled)

Observation data Epoch J2000 Equinox ICRS
- Constellation: Auriga
- Right ascension: 05^{h} 03^{m} 18.63^{s}
- Declination: +41° 26′ 29.9″
- Apparent magnitude (V): 6.08

Characteristics
- Spectral type: A2IIIshe
- U−B color index: +0.22
- B−V color index: +0.21
- Variable type: Suspected

Astrometry
Radial velocity (R_{v})	−0.7 km/s
Proper motion (μ)	RA: −0.227 mas/yr Dec.: −1.820 mas/yr
Parallax (π)	1.0065±0.0294 mas
Distance	3,240 ± 90 ly (990 ± 30 pc)
Absolute magnitude (M_{V})	−2.87

Details
Mass	3.1 M_{☉}
Radius	40 R_{☉}
Luminosity	5,370 L_{☉}
Surface gravity (log g)	cgs
Temperature	8,665 K
Rotation	0.41 days
Rotational velocity (v sin i)	23 km/s

Other designations
- NSV 1810, BD+41°1044, HD 32188, HIP 23511, HR 1615, SAO 39979

Database references
SIMBAD	data

HD 32188 is suspected variable star in the northern constellation of Auriga, and is positioned roughly in between Eta and Zeta Aurigae. It has a white hue and is just barely visible to the naked eye with an apparent visual magnitude that fluctuates around 6.08. The distance to this star is approximately 3,240 light years, based on parallax. It has an absolute magnitude of −2.87.

This object is an A-type giant star with a stellar classification of A2IIIshe. The suffix notation indicates this is a shell star, which means it has a peculiar spectrum indicating there is a circumstellar disk of gas around the star's equator. While the spectral luminosity class is III, analysis of its colour and brightness suggest it more closely resembles a supergiant star. HD 32188 has expanded to 40 times the radius of the Sun and it is spinning with a projected rotational velocity of 23 km/s. It is radiating 5,370 times the luminosity of the Sun from its enlarged photosphere at an effective temperature of 8,665 K.
