= Five Chariots =

Chinese constellation

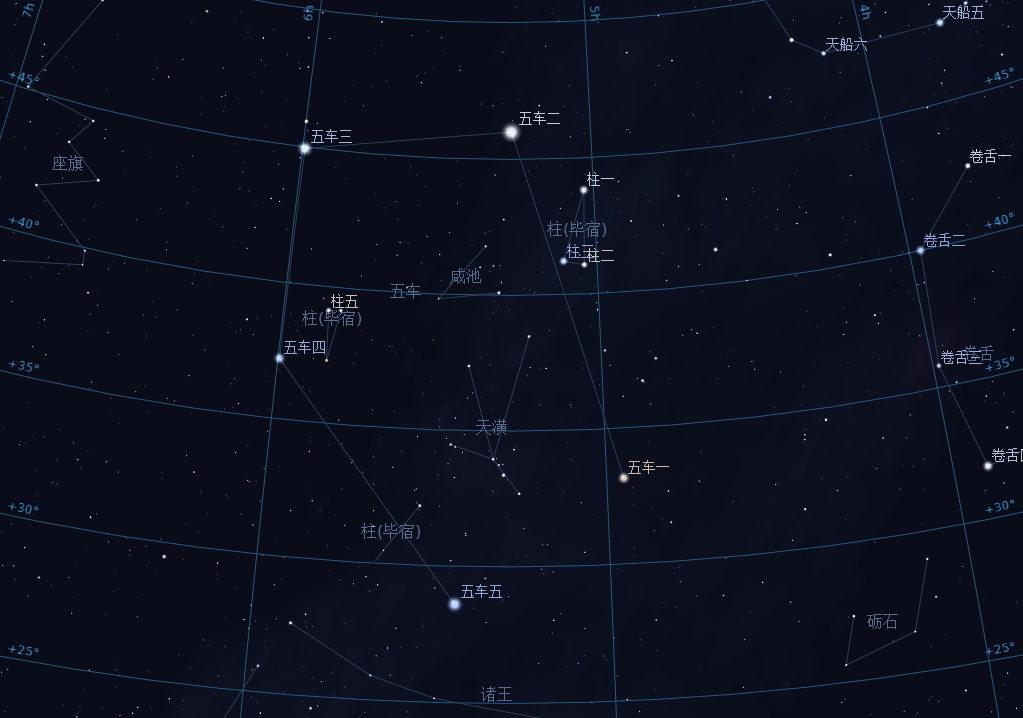

Five Chariots (五車, pinyin: Wǔ Ju) is a Chinese constellation equivalent to Auriga, minus Delta Aurigae. It is known in Japanese as Gosha (五車).

== Stars ==
- Iota Aurigae
- Alpha Aurigae
- Beta Aurigae
- Theta Aurigae
- Gamma Aurigae

== Characteristics ==
The Five Chariots is a constellation that borders Taurus. The constellation is named as such due to the five main stars, representing the Five Emperors. The constellation appears within the region of the sky dominated by the White Tiger of the West.

== Five Emperors ==
The Five Emperors represent the five elements. Four of them represent the four seasons, but the fifth represents the center. The Eastern Emperor represents wood, the Northern Emperor represents fire, and the Southern Emperor represents water. The one in the middle, Shaohao, represents earth. The Western Emperor, the Yellow Emperor, represents metal. These emperors were in control of life and death, and as such people regularly made sacrifices or gave offerings to them.
