= Ke Kā o Makaliʻi =

Hawaiian constellation

Ke Kā o Makaliʻi (lit. 'The Canoe-Bailer of Makali‘i') is a Hawaiian constellation consisting of five stars in a curving formation in the shape of a bailer surrounding the western constellation Orion, although not including any stars from it. The constellation is seen to rise in the east like a cup and set in the west pouring onto the western horizon.

Ke Kā o Makali‘i comprises five stars:

- Capella (Hawaiian: Hoku-lei, lit. 'Star-Wreath')
- Gemini (Hawaiian: Na Mahoe, lit. 'The Twins', or Nana-mua-ma, lit. 'Nana-mua and associate'),
  - Castor (Hawaiian: Nana-mua, lit. 'Look forward')
  - Pollux (Hawaiian: Nana-hope, lit. 'Look behind')
- Procyon (Hawaiian: Puana, lit. 'Blossom')
- Sirius (Hawaiian: ‘A‘a, lit. 'Burning brightly')
