= Beta Aurigae =

Binary star system in the northern constellation of Auriga

β Aurigae
- Location of β Aurigae (circled)

Observation data Epoch J2000.0 Equinox ICRS
- Constellation: Auriga
- Right ascension: 05^{h} 59^{m} 31.72293^{s}
- Declination: +44° 56′ 50.7573″
- Apparent magnitude (V): 1.89–1.98 (2.602 + 2.705)

Characteristics
- Evolutionary stage: Main sequence
- Spectral type: A1m IV + A1m IV
- U−B color index: +0.05
- B−V color index: +0.03
- R−I color index: −0.01
- Variable type: Algol variable

Astrometry
Radial velocity (R_{v})	−18.2 km/s
Proper motion (μ)	RA: −56.44 mas/yr Dec.: −0.95 mas/yr
Parallax (π)	40.82+0.16 −0.14 mas
Distance	79.253 ± 0.049 ly (24.299±0.015 pc)
Absolute magnitude (M_{V})	0.674 / 0.777

Orbit
Period (P)	3.960046633+0.000000251 −0.000000230 days
Semi-major axis (a)	(3.3651±0.0002)×10^{−3}" (17.583±0.011 R_{☉}, 0.08177±0.000051 au)
Eccentricity (e)	0.00162±0.00004
Inclination (i)	76.7875±0.0020°
Longitude of the node (Ω)	295.1466±0.0056°
Periastron epoch (T)	53,827.205±0.003
Argument of periastron (ω) (secondary)	90.83±0.24°
Semi-amplitude (K_{1}) (primary)	108.053±0.099 km/s
Semi-amplitude (K_{2}) (secondary)	110.911±0.098 km/s

Details

β Aur Aa
Mass	2.359±0.005 M_{☉}
Radius	2.752±0.002 R_{☉}
Luminosity	46.7+5.7 −5.1 L_{☉}
Surface gravity (log g)	3.93 cgs
Temperature	8,985 K
Rotational velocity (v sin i)	33 km/s
Age	400–500 Myr

β Aur Ab
Mass	2.293±0.004 M_{☉}
Radius	2.622±0.002 R_{☉}
Luminosity	40+10 −8 L_{☉}
Temperature	8,760 K
Rotational velocity (v sin i)	34 km/s
Age	400–500 Myr

Other designations
- Menkalinan, β Aurigae, 34 Aurigae, BD+44 1328, FK5 227, GC 7543, HD 40183, HIP 28360, HR 2088, SAO 40750, PPM 48617, ADS 4556, WDS J05595+4457Aa,Ab

Database references
SIMBAD	data

Beta Aurigae is a binary star system in the northern constellation of Auriga. Its identifier is a Bayer designation that is Latinized from β Aurigae, and abbreviated Beta Aur or β Aur. This star has the official name Menkalinan, pronounced /mɛŋˈkælɪnæn/. The combined apparent visual magnitude of the system is 1.9, making it the second-brightest member of the constellation after Capella. Dynamical parallax measurements yield a distance of 24.299 ± 0.015 parsecs (79.253 ± 0.049 light-years). It is drifting closer to the Sun with a radial velocity of −18 km/s.

Along their respective orbits around the Milky Way, Beta Aurigae and the Sun are closing in on each other, so that in around one million years it will become the brightest star in the night sky. It is predicted to come as close as 31.7 ly (9.72 pc) in 1.31 million years.

== Nomenclature ==
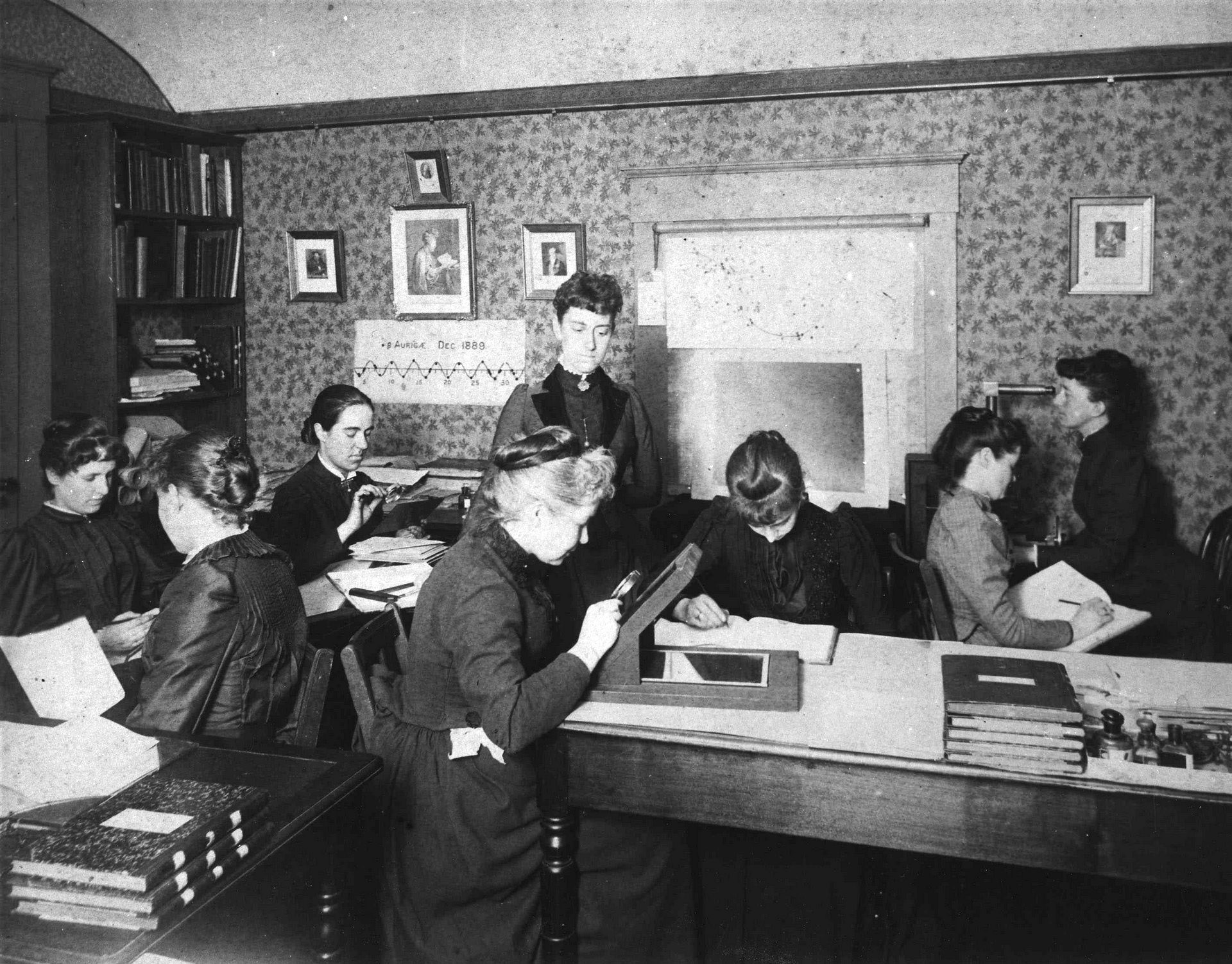
Women computers at the Harvard College Observatory; on the wall is a graph of β Aurigae's varying brightness in December 1889.

β Aurigae is the star system's Bayer designation. The traditional name Menkalinan is derived from the Arabic منكب ذي العنان mankib ðī-l-‘inān "shoulder of the rein-holder". In 2016, the International Astronomical Union organized a Working Group on Star Names (WGSN) to catalog and standardize proper names for stars. The WGSN's first bulletin of July 2016 included a table of the first two batches of names approved by the WGSN; which included Menkalinan for Beta Aurigae Aa.

It is known as 五車三 (the Third Star of the Five Chariots) in traditional Chinese astronomy.

== Properties ==
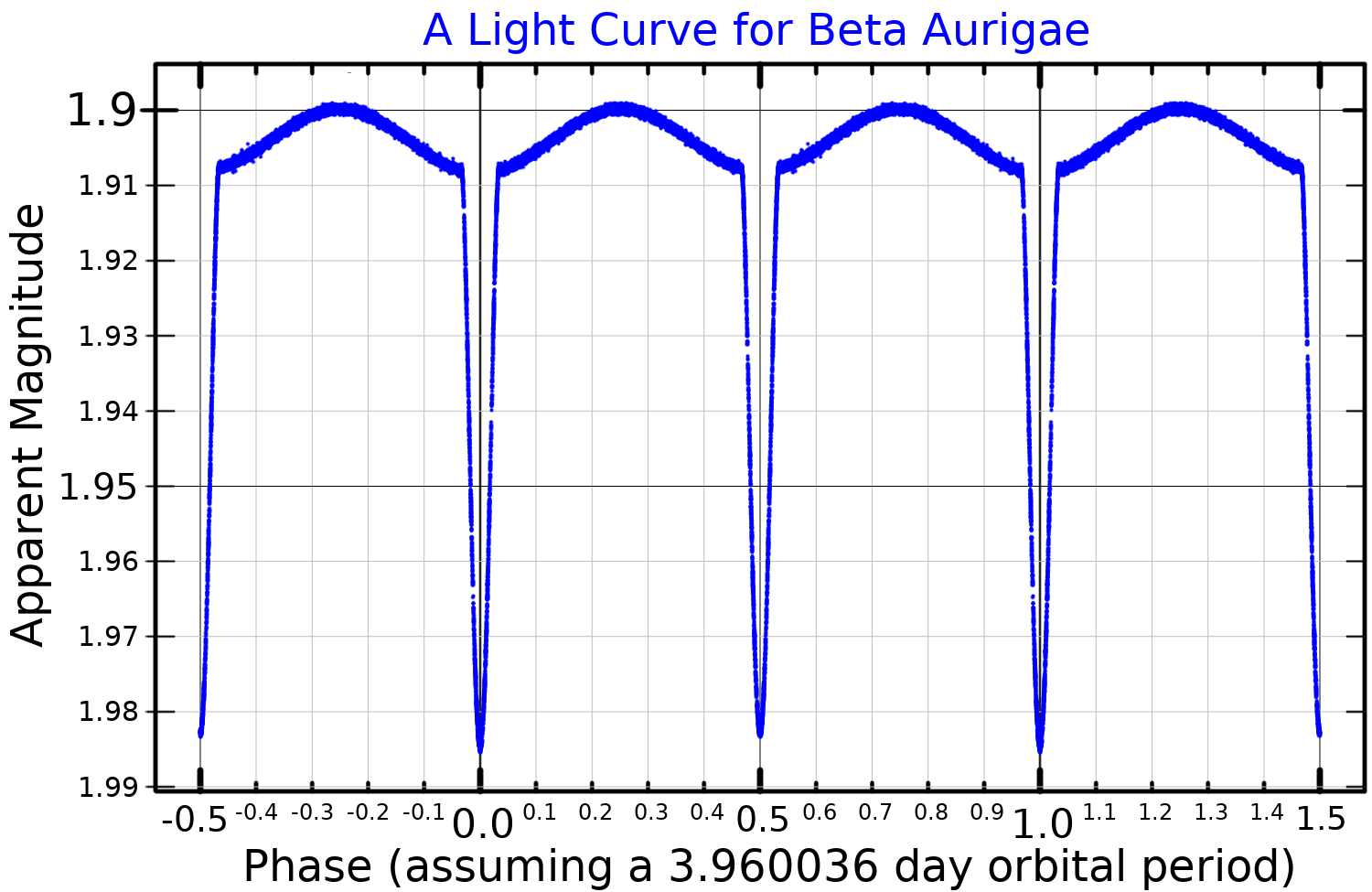
A light curve for Beta Aurigae, plotted from data published by Southworth et al. (2007)

Beta Aurigae is a binary star system, but it appears as a single star in the night sky. The two stars are metallic-lined stars belonging to the A-type stellar classification. Although the spectra have the luminosity class of a subgiant (IV), the components are still on the main sequence stage of evolution. This discrepancy arises from their nature as Am stars, which make them larger and more luminous than a "normal" star. A-type stars are hot and release a white hued light; these two stars burn brighter and with more heat than the Sun, which is a G2-type main sequence star. The pair constitute an eclipsing spectroscopic binary; the combined apparent magnitude varies over a period of 3.96 days between +1.89 and +1.94, as every 47.5 hours one of the stars partially eclipses the other from Earth's perspective. The two stars are designated Aa and Ab in modern catalogues, but have also been referred to as components 1 and 2 or A and B.

There is an 11th magnitude optical companion with a separation of 187″ as of 2011, but increasing. It is also an A-class subgiant, but is an unrelated background star.

At an angular separation of 13.9±0.3 arcseconds along a position angle of 155° is a companion star that is 8.5 magnitudes fainter than the primary. It may be the source of the X-ray emission from the vicinity. The Beta Aurigae system is believed to be a stream member of the Ursa Major Moving Group.

== See also ==
- Algol
- Capella
- Alsephina
