= Ragnar Furuhjelm =

Finnish politician and astronomer (1879–1944)

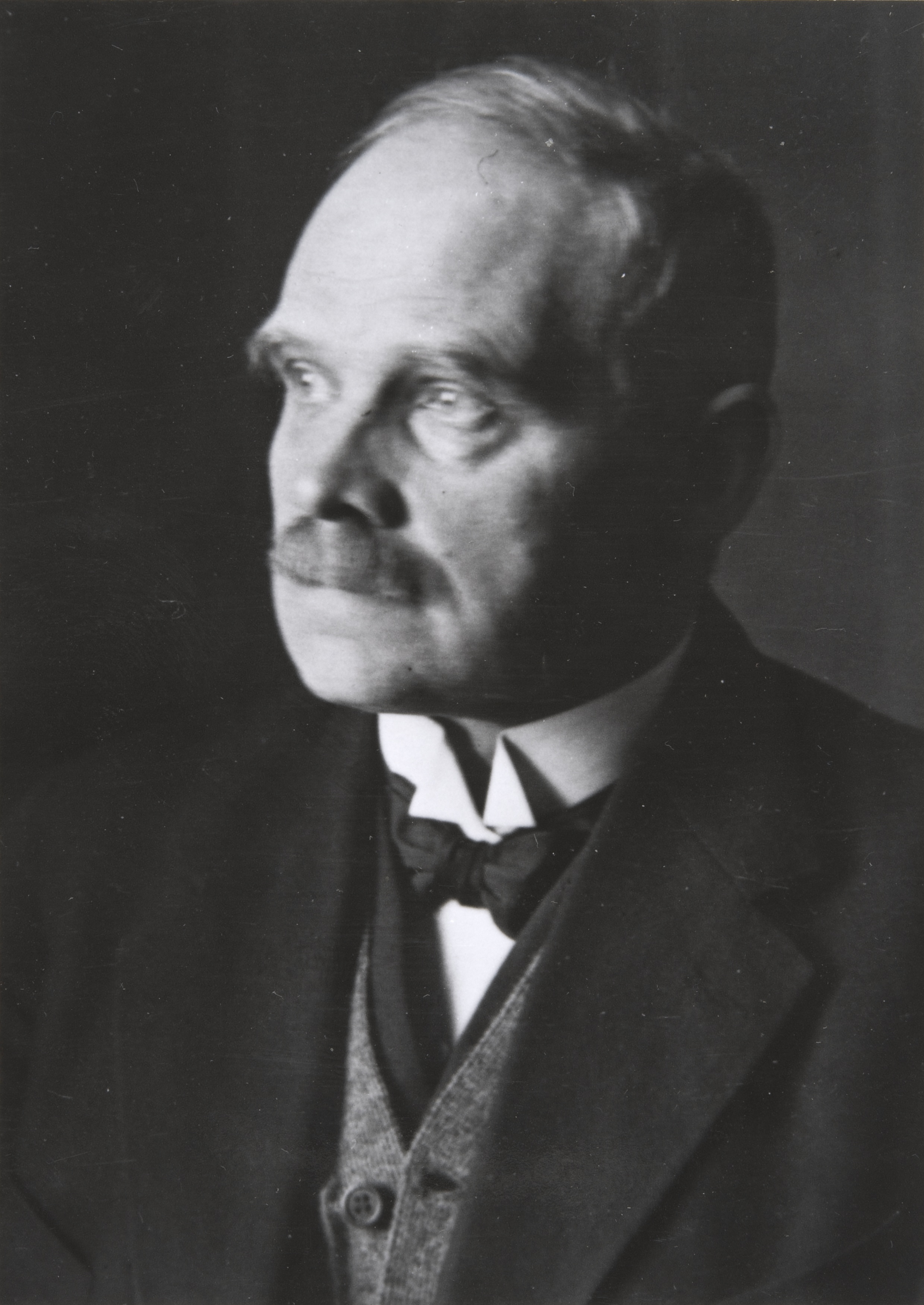
Ragnar Furuhjelm in the early 1930s.

Elis Ragnar Furuhjelm (12 October 1879 – 15 November 1944) was a Finnish astronomer and politician, born in Oulu. He was Deputy Minister of Finance from 14 December 1932 to 21 April 1933. He was a member of the Parliament of Finland from 1917 until his death in Helsinki in 1944, representing the Swedish People's Party of Finland (SFP). During the Continuation War, he was one of the signatories of the "Petition of the Thirty-three", which was presented to President Ryti by members of the Peace opposition on 20 August 1943.

He married Estrid Runeberg; their family included Mirjam Furuhjelm ( 1908-08-15 — 2003-05-19), who became a physician and professor of gynaecology.
