= V538 Aurigae =

Star in constellation Auriga

- Location of V538 Aurigae (circled in red)

Observation data Epoch J2000 Equinox ICRS
- Constellation: Auriga
- Right ascension: 05^{h} 41^{m} 20.33568^{s}
- Declination: +53° 28′ 51.8088″
- Apparent magnitude (V): 6.19 - 6.25

Characteristics
- Evolutionary stage: Main sequence
- Spectral type: K1 V
- U−B color index: 0.50
- B−V color index: 0.84
- Variable type: BY Dra

Astrometry
Radial velocity (R_{v})	0.9 km/s
Proper motion (μ)	RA: +2.804 mas/yr Dec.: −523.477 mas/yr
Parallax (π)	81.4987±0.0253 mas
Distance	40.02 ± 0.01 ly (12.270 ± 0.004 pc)
Absolute magnitude (M_{V})	5.75

Details
Mass	0.871 M_{☉}
Radius	0.82+0.02 −0.03 R_{☉}
Luminosity	0.478±0.001 L_{☉}
Surface gravity (log g)	4.55 cgs
Temperature	5,303+100 −63 K
Metallicity [Fe/H]	+0.16 dex
Rotation	11 days
Rotational velocity (v sin i)	2.80 km/s
Age	3.76 Gyr

Other designations
- V538 Aur, BD+53°934, GJ 211, HD 37394, HIP 26779, HR 1925, WDS J05413+5329A

Database references
SIMBAD	data

V538 Aurigae is a single star in the northern constellation of Auriga. With an apparent visual magnitude of about 6.2, this star requires good dark sky conditions to view with the naked eye. It is located at a distance of 40.0 light-years (12.3 pc) from Sun based on parallax. The star is drifting further away with a radial velocity of 0.9 km/s. It is a member of the Local Association, and is most likely a thin disk star.

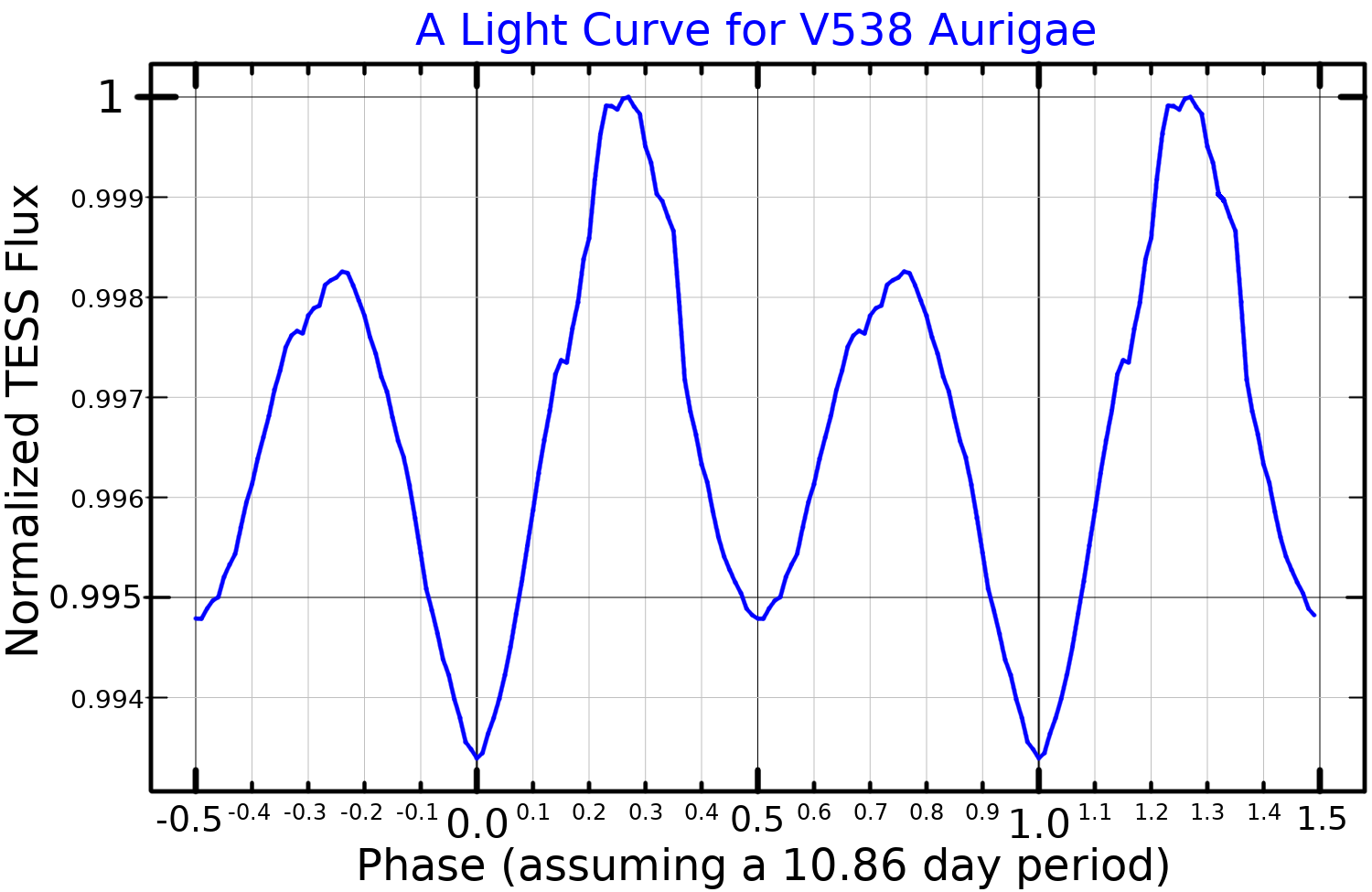
A light curve for V538 Aurigae, plotted from TESS data. The data was folded with the period of 10.86 days which was published by Gaidos et al. (2000).

Eric Gaidos et al. discovered that V538 Aurigae is a variable star based on observations by robotic telescopes at Fairborn Observatory from 1993 through 1999, and they announced their discovery in 2000. The star was given its variable star designation in 2006. This is a BY Draconis variable, which means it undergoes changes in luminosity because regions of pronounced surface magnetic activity are moved into and out of the line of sight from the Earth as the star rotates (once every 11 days). It has a spectral class of K1 V, indicating that it is a K-type main sequence star. The star has 87% of the mass of the Sun and 82% of the Sun's radius. It is an estimated 3.76 billion years old. The star is radiating 48% of the Sun's luminosity from its photosphere at an effective temperature of 5,303 K.

It has a common proper motion companion designated Vys 465 (HD 233153), which is a red dwarf with a class of M0.5V and a visual magnitude of 9.87. Their projected separation is 1,204 AU.
