= Tau Aurigae =

Star in the constellation of Auriga

τ Aurigae
- Location of τ Aurigae (circled)

Observation data Epoch J2000 Equinox ICRS
- Constellation: Auriga
- Right ascension: 05^{h} 49^{m} 10.438^{s}
- Declination: +39° 10′ 51.86″
- Apparent magnitude (V): 4.505

Characteristics
- Evolutionary stage: horizontal branch
- Spectral type: G8IIIb Fe-1
- U−B color index: +0.692
- B−V color index: +0.956
- R−I color index: 0.49

Astrometry
Radial velocity (R_{v})	−19.32±0.19 km/s
Proper motion (μ)	RA: −28.265 mas/yr Dec.: −25.064 mas/yr
Parallax (π)	15.5486±0.1215 mas
Distance	210 ± 2 ly (64.3 ± 0.5 pc)
Absolute magnitude (M_{V})	0.50

Details
Mass	2.55 M_{☉}
Radius	11 R_{☉}
Luminosity	63 L_{☉}
Surface gravity (log g)	2.7 cgs
Temperature	4,887 K
Metallicity [Fe/H]	−0.27 dex
Rotational velocity (v sin i)	3.8 km/s
Age	660 to 890 Myr

Other designations
- τ Aur, 29 Aurigae, BD+39 1418, HD 38656, HIP 27483, HR 1995, SAO 58465

Database references
SIMBAD	data

Tau Aurigae is a star in the northern constellation Auriga. Its name is a Bayer designation that is Latinized from τ Aurigae, and abbreviated Tau Aur or τ Aur. This star is visible to the naked eye with an apparent visual magnitude of 4.5 and is positioned about a half degree west of the brighter star Nu Aurigae. Based on parallax measurements, it is approximately 210 light-years (64 parsecs) distant from Earth. The star is drifting closer to the Sun with a radial velocity of −19 km/s.

Tau Aurigae is an evolved giant star with a stellar classification of G8IIIb Fe-1, which indicates it has exhausted the supply of hydrogen at its core and expanded off the main sequence of Sun-like stars. The 'Fe-1' notation indicates that the stellar spectrum has anomalously weak lines of iron. This star is an estimated 660–890 million years old and is spinning with a projected rotational velocity of 3.8 km/s. With 2.6 times the mass of the Sun, it has 11 times the Sun's radius and shines with 63 times the Sun's luminosity. This energy is radiated into outer space from the photosphere at an effective temperature of 4,887 K. This heat gives it the yellow-hued glow of a G-type star.
