= Theta Aurigae =

Binary star in the constellation Auriga

θ Aurigae
- Location of θ Aurigae (circled)

Observation data Epoch J2000 Equinox ICRS
- Constellation: Auriga
- Right ascension: 05^{h} 59^{m} 43.27012^{s}
- Declination: +37° 12′ 45.3047″
- Apparent magnitude (V): 2.62–2.70

Characteristics
- Spectral type: A0pSi + F2-5V
- U−B color index: −0.18
- B−V color index: −0.08
- R−I color index: −0.06
- Variable type: α^{2} CVn

Astrometry
Radial velocity (R_{v})	+29.5 km/s
Proper motion (μ)	RA: +43.63 mas/yr Dec.: −73.79 mas/yr
Parallax (π)	19.70±0.16 mas
Distance	166 ± 1 ly (50.8 ± 0.4 pc)
Absolute magnitude (M_{V})	−1.05

Details
Mass	3.24 M_{☉}
Radius	4.68 R_{☉}
Luminosity	214 L_{☉}
Surface gravity (log g)	3.61 cgs
Temperature	10,220 K
Rotation	3.6187 days
Rotational velocity (v sin i)	55 km/s
Age	288 Myr

Other designations
- Mahasim, 37 Aurigae, BD+37°1380, HD 40312, HIP 28380, HR 2095, SAO 58636, ADS 4566, WDS 05597+3713

Database references
SIMBAD	data

Theta Aurigae is a binary star system in the constellation of Auriga. Its name is a Bayer designation that is Latinized from θ Aurigae, and abbreviated Theta Aur or θ Aur. This is a variable star with an apparent visual magnitude that varies from 2.62 to 2.70, which is bright enough to be seen with the naked eye. Based upon parallax measurements, the distance to this system is about 166 light-years (51 parsecs). It is drifting further away from the Sun with a mean radial velocity of +29.5 km/s.

The two components are designated Theta Aurigae A and B. The former star is the primary and has the proper name Mahasim.

== Nomenclature ==
θ Aurigae (Latinised to Theta Aurigae) is the system's Bayer designation. The designations of the two components as Theta Aurigae A and B derive from the convention used by the Washington Multiplicity Catalog (WMC) for multiple star systems, and adopted by the International Astronomical Union (IAU).

Some authors state that Theta Aurigae had no traditional name,although Richard Hinckley Allen makes a passing reference about the name Mahasim, as a name also used, with various spellings, for Eta Aurigae and Lambda Herculis, from the Arabic المِعْصَم al-miʽşam "the wrist" (of the charioteer). In 2016, the IAU organized a Working Group on Star Names (WGSN) to catalog and standardize proper names for stars. The WGSN decided to attribute proper names to individual stars rather than entire multiple systems. It approved the name Mahasim for the component Theta Aurigae A on 30 June 2017 and it is now so included in the List of IAU-approved Star Names.

It is known as 五車四 (the Fourth Star of the Five Chariots) in Chinese

== Properties ==
The primary component, Theta Aurigae A, is a large star with more than three times the mass of the Sun and nearly five times the Sun's radius. It is radiating 214 times the Sun's luminosity from its outer atmosphere at an effective temperature of 10,220 K, giving it the white hue of an A-type star. The star has a stellar classification of A0pSi, with the 'pSi' suffix indicating it is a chemically peculiar star with an abnormal abundance of silicon.

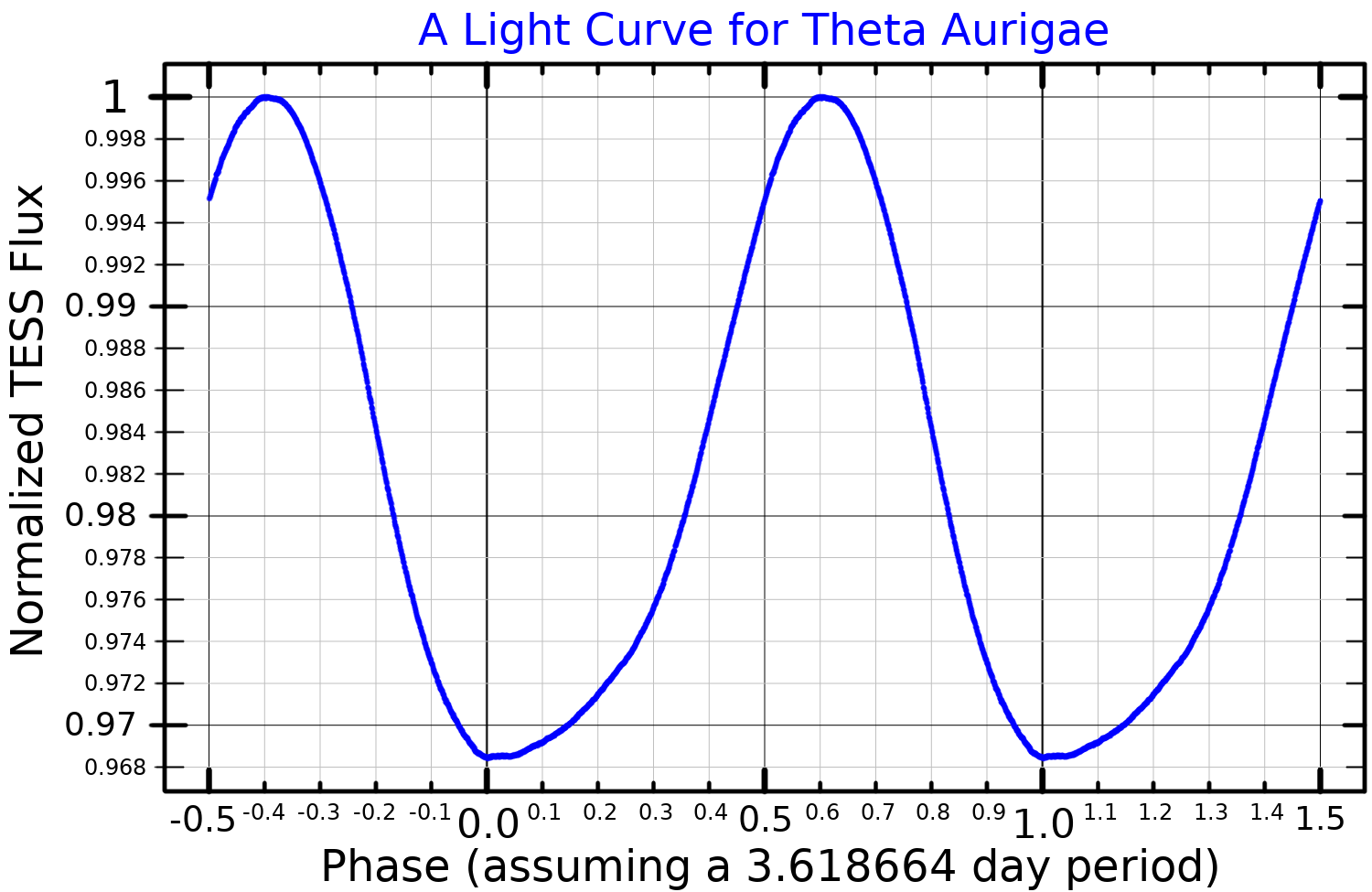
A light curve for Theta Aurigae, plotted from TESS data

The primary is classified an Alpha2 Canum Venaticorum type variable star and has a surface magnetic field of about 1 kG. Its projected rotational velocity is 55 km s^{−1}, with the star completing a rotation in only 3.6 days. The axis of rotation is inclined by an angle of 51°±6° to the line of sight from the Earth.

The secondary, Theta Aurigae B, is a +7.2 magnitude companion, 4.5 magnitudes fainter than the primary, located at an angular separation of 3.91 arcseconds along a position angle of 304.9° as of 2002. This is an F-type main sequence star with a stellar classification in the range F2-5 V.

The mean combined apparent magnitude of the system is +2.65 but the variation of the primary causes the system's brightness to range from magnitude +2.62 to +2.70 with a period of 1.37 days. The system is an X-ray source with a luminosity of 9.49×10^{26} erg s^{−1}.
