= Upsilon Aurigae =

Star in the constellation Auriga

υ Aurigae
- Location of υ Aurigae (circled)

Observation data Epoch J2000 Equinox ICRS
- Constellation: Auriga
- Right ascension: 05^{h} 51^{m} 02.437^{s}
- Declination: +37° 18′ 20.05″
- Apparent magnitude (V): 4.74

Characteristics
- Evolutionary stage: Asymptotic giant branch
- Spectral type: M0 III
- U−B color index: +1.93
- B−V color index: +1.62
- R−I color index: 1.07
- Variable type: Suspected

Astrometry
Radial velocity (R_{v})	+37.62±0.34 km/s
Proper motion (μ)	RA: +36.426 mas/yr Dec.: −45.606 mas/yr
Parallax (π)	5.7358±0.2055 mas
Distance	570 ± 20 ly (174 ± 6 pc)
Absolute magnitude (M_{V})	−1.28

Details
Mass	1.64±0.22 M_{☉}
Radius	80.46±2.66 R_{☉}
Luminosity	1,165±250 L_{☉}
Surface gravity (log g)	1.16+0.04 −0.08 cgs
Temperature	3,912±52 K
Age	1.98±0.68 Gyr

Other designations
- υ Aur, 31 Aurigae, NSV 2661, BD+37 1336, FK5 2440, GC 7322, HD 38944, HIP 27639, HR 2011, SAO 58496, PPM 70915

Database references
SIMBAD	data

Upsilon Aurigae is a single star in the northern constellation of Auriga. Its name is a Bayer designation that is Latinised from υ Aurigae, and abbreviated Upsilon Aur or υ Aur. This star has an apparent visual magnitude of 4.74, which means it is bright enough to be seen with the naked eye. Based upon parallax measurements, this star is approximately 570 light-years (170 parsecs) distant from the Earth. It is drifting further away with a radial velocity of +37 km/s.

This is an evolved red giant star with a stellar classification of M0 III. It is a suspected variable star and is currently on the asymptotic giant branch, which means it is generating energy through the fusion of helium along a shell surrounding a small, inert core of carbon and oxygen. The star is two billion years old with 1.64 times the mass of the Sun and has expanded to 80 times the Sun's radius. It is radiating 1,165 times the Sun's luminosity from its photosphere at an effective temperature of 3,912 K.
