= Iota Aurigae =

Star in the constellation Auriga

ι Aurigae
- Location of ι Aurigae (circled)

Observation data Epoch J2000 Equinox ICRS
- Constellation: Auriga
- Right ascension: 04^{h} 56^{m} 59.620^{s}
- Declination: +33° 09′ 57.94″
- Apparent magnitude (V): 2.69

Characteristics
- Evolutionary stage: horizontal branch
- Spectral type: K3 II–III
- U−B color index: +1.78
- B−V color index: +1.53
- R−I color index: +0.82
- Variable type: Suspected

Astrometry
Radial velocity (R_{v})	+17.78 km/s
Proper motion (μ)	RA: +3.817 mas/yr Dec.: −17.786 mas/yr
Parallax (π)	7.2491±0.3819 mas
Distance	450 ± 20 ly (138 ± 7 pc)
Absolute magnitude (M_{V})	−3.20

Details
Mass	7.1±0.7 M_{☉}
Radius	126 R_{☉}
Luminosity	3,897±327 L_{☉}
Temperature	4,059±125 K
Metallicity [Fe/H]	−0.11 dex
Rotational velocity (v sin i)	8 km/s
Age	39.8±4.9 Myr

Other designations
- Hassaleh, Kabdhilinan, ι Aur, 3 Aurigae, BD+32°855, FK5 181, GC 6029, HD 31398, HIP 23015, HR 1577, SAO 57522

Database references
SIMBAD	data

Iota Aurigae is a star in the northern constellation of Auriga. Its name is a Bayer designation that is Latinized from ι Aurigae, abbreviated Iota Aur or ι Aur. The star has the official name Hassaleh, pronounced /ˈhæsəleɪ/. It has an apparent visual magnitude of 2.7, which is bright enough to be readily visible to the naked eye. Parallax measurements give a distance estimate of roughly 450 light-years (140 parsecs) from the Sun. It is drifting further away with a radial velocity of +18 km/s.

== Nomenclature ==
ι Aurigae (Latinised to Iota Aurigae) is the star's Bayer designation.

It bore the traditional name Al Kab, short for Kabdhilinan /kæbˈdɪlɪnæn/, from the Arabic كعب ذي العنان kaʽb ðīl-ʽinān "the ankle of the rein holder (charioteer)". Under the name Alkab, this star is a marker on the astrolabe described by Geoffrey Chaucer in his Treatise on the Astrolabe in 1391.

It bore the novel name Hassaleh in Antonín Bečvář's 1951 atlas. The origin and meaning of the name have not been discovered despite extensive search, and no connection to any language has been discovered. The IAU Working Group on Star Names (WGSN) has approved the proper name Hassaleh for this star.

It is known as 五車一 (the First Star of the Five Chariots) in Chinese.

== Properties ==
At Iota Aurigae's distance, extinction from interstellar dust is causing a magnitude reduction of about 0.6. Examination of the spectrum yields a stellar classification of K3 II–III, with the luminosity class of 'II–III' indicating this is a evolved hybrid giant star. Since 1943, the spectrum of this star has served as one of the stable anchor points by which other stars are classified. The effective temperature of the outer envelope is 4,160 K, which is cooler than the Sun's effective temperature and gives Iota Aurigae the orange hue of a K-type star.

It is a weak X-ray emitter with an X-ray luminosity of about 1.8×10^{27} ergs s^{−1}. This emission is most likely coming from transient loops of plasma in Iota Aurigae's outer atmosphere, which have a temperature of around 3 million K. This is a suspected variable star.

During the Extreme Solar Systems conference held on June 25–29, 2007, in Santorini, Greece, Reffert et al. announced the detection of two substellar objects orbiting Iota Aurigae in 2:1 resonance. Such companions would be brown dwarfs with orbital periods of approximately 2 and 4 years. No minimum mass for the candidates was provided. As of 2008, the detection has not been confirmed, though Hekker et al. (2008) listed significant radial velocity variations at periods of 767 and 1586 days. It may instead be an oscillating star undergoing non-radial pulsations with a period of about four years.
