= Chi Aurigae =

Binary star system in the constellation Auriga

- The location of χ Aurigae (circled)

Observation data Epoch J2000 Equinox ICRS
- Constellation: Auriga
- Right ascension: 05^{h} 32^{m} 43.67437^{s}
- Declination: +32° 11′ 31.2805″
- Apparent magnitude (V): 4.74

Characteristics
- Spectral type: B5 Iab
- U−B color index: −0.44
- B−V color index: +0.32

Astrometry
Radial velocity (R_{v})	7.27±5.21 km/s
Proper motion (μ)	RA: −0.812 mas/yr Dec.: −3.15 mas/yr
Parallax (π)	0.9087±0.1906 mas
Distance	3,910±420 ly (1,200±130 pc)
Absolute magnitude (M_{V})	−6.4

Orbit
Period (P)	676.85 ± 0.21 d
Eccentricity (e)	0.116 ± 0.048
Longitude of the node (Ω)	181.7° ± 24.3°
Periastron epoch (T)	2422754.2 ± 46.1 HJD
Semi-amplitude (K_{1}) (primary)	22.0 ± 2.9 km/s

Details
Mass	21.1±0.2 M_{☉}
Radius	68±8 R_{☉}
Luminosity	190,500+49,300 −39,200 L_{☉}
Surface gravity (log g)	2.11±0.06 cgs
Temperature	14,600±300 K
Rotational velocity (v sin i)	40 km/s
Age	8.7 Myr

Other designations
- χ Aur, 25 Aurigae, BD+32°1024, GC 6849, HD 36371, HIP 25984, HR 1843, SAO 58164, PPM 70517

Database references
SIMBAD	data

Chi Aurigae is a binary star system in the northern constellation of Auriga. Its name is a Bayer designation that is Latinized from χ Aurigae, and abbreviated Chi Aur or χ Aur. This star is visible to the naked eye with an apparent visual magnitude of 4.74. The brightness of the star is diminished by 1.26 in magnitude from extinction caused by intervening gas and dust. It is a member of the Aur OB1 association of co-moving stars.

Chi Aurigae is a single-lined spectroscopic binary with an orbital period of 676.85 d and an eccentricity of 0.116. The primary component of this system is a supergiant star with a stellar classification of B5 Iab. It is over 190,000 times more luminous, around 20 times more massive and around 70 times larger than the Sun. The photosphere has an effective temperature of 14,600 K. Its stellar wind is causing mass loss at the rate of (0.38–0.46)×10^{−9} solar masses per year, or the equivalent of the Sun's mass every 2.4 billion years.

The distance of Chi Aurigae is determined at 3,900 light-years based on spectroscopic observations. Parallax measurements by the Hipparcos spacecraft were unsuccessful because the parallax error was bigger than the value itself, while the Gaia spacecraft measured the parallax with a 22% error, giving a distance of 3,590±750 ly.
