= 26 Aurigae =

Star in the constellation Auriga

Observation data Epoch J2000 Equinox ICRS
- Constellation: Auriga
- Right ascension: 05^{h} 38^{m} 38.08510^{s}
- Declination: +30° 29′ 32.7054″
- Apparent magnitude (V): 5.406 (6.29 / 6.21)

Characteristics
- Spectral type: G8III + A1IV or B9.5V
- U−B color index: +0.25
- B−V color index: +0.45
- Variable type: suspected

Astrometry
| Proper motion (μ) | RA: −21.32 mas/yr Dec.: −10.10 mas/yr |
| Distance | 163 pc |
| Absolute magnitude (M_{V}) | −0.29 |

Orbit
| Primary | 26 Aur A |
| Name | 26 Aur B |
| Period (P) | 52.735±0.156 yr |
| Semi-major axis (a) | 0.154±0.001" (21.1+3.2 −2.4 AU) |
| Eccentricity (e) | 0.653±0.002 |
| Inclination (i) | 124.22±0.29° |
| Longitude of the node (Ω) | 127.08±0.38° |
| Periastron epoch (T) | 1974.927±0.026 |
| Argument of periastron (ω) (secondary) | 309.07±0.14° |

Details

26 Aur A
| Mass | 2.1 ± 1.0 M_{☉} |

26 Aur B
| Mass | 3.0 ± 0.4 M_{☉} |

Other designations
- 26 Aur, BD+30°963, GC 7002, HD 37269, HIP 26536, HR 1914, SAO 58280, PPM 70656, ADS 4229, WDS J05386+3030, GSC 02404-01350

Database references
| SIMBAD | data |

26 Aurigae is a binary star system in the northern constellation of Auriga. It is visible to the naked eye as a faint star with an apparent visual magnitude of 5.41.

The distance to this system remains poorly constrained. The new Hipparcos reduction gives a parallax of 5.76±6.42. The original Hipparcos parallax was given as 7.29±0.96, leading to a distance of 137.2+20.8
−16.0 pc being assumed in many texts. A distance of 163 pc has been derived from fitting the spectrum.

26 Aurigae is a visual binary system, and the two stars orbit each other every 52.735 years with an ellipticity of 0.653 and an angular separation 0.154″. The system is made of a magnitude 6.29 G-type red giant, and a hotter magnitude 6.21 star that has been classified as an early B-type main-sequence star to an A-type subgiant star. Component A is the cool giant star, the brighter but less massive of the pair. The hotter star is sometimes listed as the primary on the basis of its stronger showing in the blended spectrum.
