= Nu Aurigae =

Variable star in the constellation Auriga

ν Aurigae
- Location of ν Aurigae (circled)

Observation data Epoch J2000 Equinox J2000
- Constellation: Auriga
- Right ascension: 05^{h} 51^{m} 29.36946^{s}
- Declination: +39° 08′ 54.6861″
- Apparent magnitude (V): 3.957

Characteristics
- Evolutionary stage: red clump
- Spectral type: G9.5 III Fe1 Ba0.2 + wd
- U−B color index: +1.084
- B−V color index: +1.138
- R−I color index: 0.56

Astrometry
Radial velocity (R_{v})	+9.92±0.14 km/s
Proper motion (μ)	RA: +7.958 mas/yr Dec.: +0.713 mas/yr
Parallax (π)	16.1414±0.4427 mas
Distance	202 ± 6 ly (62 ± 2 pc)
Absolute magnitude (M_{V})	−0.27

Details
Mass	2.12 M_{☉}
Radius	17.85+0.51 −0.53 R_{☉}
Luminosity	126±8 L_{☉}
Surface gravity (log g)	2.4 cgs
Temperature	4,576±50 K
Metallicity [Fe/H]	−0.14 dex
Rotational velocity (v sin i)	5.0 km/s
Age	1.11 Gyr

Other designations
- ν Aur, 32 Aurigae, BD+39 1429, FK5 221, GC 7334, HD 39003, HIP 27673, HR 2012, SAO 58502, PPM 70925, ADS 4440, WDS J05515+3909A

Database references
SIMBAD	data

Nu Aurigae is a star in the northern constellation of Auriga. Its name is a Bayer designation that is Latinised from ν Aurigae, and abbreviated Nu Aur or ν Aur. This star is visible to the naked eye with an apparent visual magnitude of 3.96. Based on parallax measurements, it is approximately 202 light-years (62 parsecs) distant from the Earth. The star is drifting further away from the Sun with a radial velocity of +10 km/s.

This is an evolved giant star with a stellar classification of G9.5 III. At 1.1 billion years of age, it is a red clump star that is generating energy through the fusion of helium at its core. Its outer envelope has expanded to 18 times the radius of the Sun and cooled to 4,576 K, giving it the characteristic yellow-hued glow of a G-type star. It shines with 126 times the luminosity of the Sun and has 2.12 times the Sun's mass.

This is an astrometric binary with a suspected white dwarf companion. Radial velocity variations suggest an orbital period of 20.18 ± 0.85 yr (7,370 ± 310 d) with a large eccentricity of 0.71. A 10th-magnitude star 54.6 arcseconds away is an optical companion.

== See also ==
- NO Aurigae
