= List of brightest natural objects in the sky =

This list contains most natural objects with an apparent magnitude of 4 or above. All objects are listed by their visual magnitudes, and objects too close together to be distinguished are listed jointly. Objects are listed by their proper names or their most commonly used stellar designation. This list does not include transient objects such as comets, or supernovae.

== List ==
| Apparent magnitude (V) | | Name/designation | Object type | Notes |
| Average | Maximum | Name/designation | Object type | Notes |
|---|---|---|---|---|
| −26.74 | −26.78 (Note: Maximum brightness derived from the average magnitude (−26.74), taking into account the Earth's orbital eccentricity (0.0167) as per the formula: $-26.78\approx-2.5\log_{10}\frac{10^{-26.74\cdot-0.4}}{(1-0.0167)^2}$) | Sun | Star | Brightest star |
| −10.79 (Note: Average brightness derived from the magnitude of the average full moon (−12.74), assuming a quarter Moon is one-sixth as bright as the average full moon, as per the formula: $-10.79\approx-2.5\log_{10}\frac{10^{-12.74\cdot-0.4}}{6}$) | −12.90 (Note: Maximum brightness derived from the magnitude of the average full moon (−12.74), taking into account the Earth's orbital eccentricity (0.0167) and the Moon's orbital eccentricity (0.0554) as per the formula: $-12.90\approx-2.5\log_{10}\frac{10^{-12.74\cdot-0.4}}{(1-0.0167)^{2}\left(1-0.0554\right)^{2}}$) | Moon | Natural satellite | Brightest natural satellite |
| −4.14 | −4.92 | Venus | Planet | Brightest planet |
| −2.20 | −2.94 | Jupiter | Planet | |
| −1.46 | | Sirius | Binary star system | Brightest night star |
| −0.74 | | Canopus | Star | |
| −0.29 | | Alpha Centauri AB | Binary star system | Part of a triple star system with Proxima Centauri |
| −0.05 | | Arcturus | Star | Brightest Population II star |
| 0.03 | −0.02 | Vega | Star | |
| 0.08 | 0.03 | Capella | Quadruple star system | Brightest quadruple star system |
| 0.13 | 0.05 | Rigel | Quadruple star system | |
| 0.13 | | Large Magellanic Cloud | Galaxy | Brightest galaxy |
| 0.23 | −2.48 | Mercury | Planet | |
| 0.37 | | Procyon | Binary star system | |
| 0.42 | 0.0 | Betelgeuse | Binary star system | |
| 0.46 | −0.55 | Saturn | Planet | Includes rings |
| 0.46 | 0.40 | Achernar | Binary star system | |
| 0.61 | | Beta Centauri (Hadar) | Triple star system | Slightly variable |
| 0.71 | −2.94 | Mars | Planet | |
| 0.77 | | Altair | Star | Slightly variable |
| 0.79 | | Acrux | Quintuple star system | Brightest quintuple star system |
| 0.86 | 0.75 | Aldebaran | Star | |
| 0.91 | 0.88 | Antares | Binary star system | |
| 0.97 | 0.96 | Spica | Binary star system | |
| 1.14 | | Pollux | Star | |
| 1.16 | | Fomalhaut | Star | Part of a Triple star system with TW Piscis Austrini and Fomalhaut C |
| 1.25 | 1.21 | Deneb | Star | |
| 1.25 | 1.23 | Mimosa | Binary star system | |
| 1.40 | | Regulus | Quadruple star system | |
| 1.50 | | Epsilon Canis Majoris | Binary star system | |
| 1.58 | | Castor | Sextenary star system | Brightest sextuple star system |
| 1.62 | | Lambda Scorpii (Shaula) | Triple star system | |
| 1.64 | 1.59 | Bellatrix | Star | |
| 1.64 | | Gacrux | Star | |
| 1.65 | | Beta Tauri (Elnath) | Star | |
| 1.69 | 1.64 | Alnilam | Star | |
| 1.69 | | Beta Carinae (Miaplacidus) | Star | |
| 1.71 (Note: Combined magnitude derived from adding the magnitudes of Gamma^{2} Velorum (1.83) and Gamma^{1} Velorum (4.173 ± 0.009) as per the formula: $1.71\approx-2.5\log_{10}\left(10^{-0.4\cdot1.83}+10^{-0.4\cdot4.173}\right)$) | 1.69 (Note: Combined magnitude from adding the magnitudes of Gamma^{2} Velorum (1.81 maximum) and Gamma^{1} Velorum (4.173 ± 0.009) as per the formula: $1.69\approx-2.5\log_{10}\left(10^{-0.4\cdot1.81}+10^{-0.4\cdot4.173}\right)$) | Gamma Velorum | Double star | |
| 1.71 | | Alpha Gruis (Alnair) | Star | |
| 1.77 | 1.75 | Alioth | Star | |
| 1.77 | | Alnitak | Triple star system | |
| 1.79 | | Alpha Persei (Mirfak) | Star | |
| 1.79 | | Dubhe | Binary star system | |
| 1.84 | | Delta Canis Majoris (Wezen) | Star | |
| 1.85 | | Epsilon Sagittarii (Kaus Australis) | Binary star system | |
| 1.85 | | Theta Scorpii | Binary star system | |
| 1.86 | | Alkaid | Star | |
| 1.86 | | Epsilon Carinae (Avior) | Binary star system | |
| 1.87 | | Small Magellanic Cloud | Galaxy | |
| 1.88 | | Alpha Trianguli Australis (Atria) | Star | |
| 1.90 | 1.89 | Beta Aurigae (Menkalinan) | Binary star system | |
| 1.918 | | Alpha Pavonis (Peacock) | Binary star system | |
| 1.92 | | Gamma Geminorum (Alhena) | Binary star system | |
| 1.95 | | Delta Velorum | Triple star system | Maximum brightness; 96% chance of being a quadruple star system |
| 1.97 | 1.87 | Beta Canis Majoris (Mirzam) | Star | |
| 1.97 | | Alphard | Star | |
| 2.00 | 1.84 | Gamma Leonis | Binary star system | |
| 2.01 | | Hamal | Star | |
| 2.01 | | Beta Ceti (Diphda) | Star | |
| 2.01 (Note: Combined magnitude derived from adding the magnitudes of Mizar A (2.220 ±0.003) and Mizar B (3.88) as per the formula: $2.01\approx-2.5\log_{10}\left(10^{-0.4\cdot2.220}+10^{-0.4\cdot3.88}\right)$) | | Mizar | Quadruple star system | |
| 2.02 | 1.86 | Polaris | Triple star system | |
| 2.05 | 2.01 | Mirach | Star | |
| 2.05 | | Theta Centauri (Menkent) | Star | |
| 2.06 | 2.02 | Alpheratz | Binary star system | |
| 2.06 | 2.04 | Saiph | Star | |
| 2.067 | | Sigma Sagittarii (Nunki) | Star | |
| 2.07 | | Alpha Ophiuchi (Rasalhague) | Binary star system | |
| 2.08 | | Kochab | Star | |
| 2.10 | | Gamma Andromedae | Quadruple star system | |
| 2.11 | 2.0 | Beta Gruis (Tiaki) | Star | |
| 2.12 | | Algol | Triple star system | Maximum brightness |
| 2.14 | 2.115 | Denebola | Star | |
| 2.17 | | Gamma Centauri | Binary star system | |
| 2.21 | 2.14 | Lambda Velorum (Suhail) | Star | |
| 2.23 | | Gamma Cygni (Sadr) | Star | Suspected variable star |
| 2.23 | | Alpha Cassiopeiae (Schedar) | Star | |
| 2.230 | | Gamma Draconis (Eltanin) | Star | |
| 2.24 | 2.21 | Alpha Coronae Borealis (Alphecca) | Binary star system | |
| 2.25 | 2.24 | Zeta Puppis (Naos) | Star | |
| 2.26 | 2.23 | Iota Carinae (Aspidiske) | Star | |
| 2.27 | 2.25 | Beta Cassiopeiae (Caph) | Star | |
| 2.29 | | Epsilon Scorpii (Larawag) | Star | Suspected variable star |
| 2.30 | 2.29 | Epsilon Centauri | Star | |
| 2.30 | 2.29 | Alpha Lupi (Uridim) | Star | |
| 2.31 | 2.30 | Eta Centauri | Star | |
| 2.32 | 1.86 | Delta Scorpii (Dschubba) | Binary star system | |
| 2.37 | | Merak | Star | |
| 2.38 | | Alpha Phoenicis (Ankaa) | Binary star system | |
| 2.39 | 1.6 | Gamma Cassiopeiae (Tiansi) | Binary star system | |
| 2.39 | 2.29 | Epsilon Pegasi (Enif) | Star | Normal maximum brightness is 2.29; magnitude 0.7 once observed |
| 2.39 | | Epsilon Boötis | Binary star system | |
| 2.41 | 2.14 | Mintaka | Triple star system | |
| 2.41 | | Kappa Scorpii | Binary star system | Maximum brightness |
| 2.42 | 2.31 | Beta Pegasi (Scheat) | Star | |
| 2.42 | | Eta Ophiuchi | Binary star system | |
| 2.440 | | Phecda | Binary star system | |
| 2.45 | 2.38 | Eta Canis Majoris (Aludra) | Star | |
| 2.46 | | Alpha Cephei (Alderamin) | Star | Suspected variable star |
| 2.473 | | Kappa Velorum (Markeb) | Binary star system | |
| 2.48 | | Alpha Pegasi (Markab) | Star | |
| 2.480 | | Epsilon Cygni | Binary star system | |
| 2.50 | | Beta Scorpii (Acrab) | Sextenary star system | |
| 2.52 | 2.51 | Delta Centauri | Star | |
| 2.53 | | Alpha Ceti (Menkar) | Star | |
| 2.53 | | Delta Leonis (Zosma) | Star | |
| 2.55 | | Zeta Centauri (Leepwal) | Binary star system | |
| 2.56 | | Zeta Ophiuchi | Star | Maximum brightness |
| 2.57 | | Alpha Leporis (Arneb) | Star | |
| 2.58 | | Gamma Corvi | Binary star system | |
| 2.59 | | Zeta Sagittarii | Triple star system | |
| 2.62 | 2.60 | Beta Librae (Zubeneschemali) | Star | |
| 2.63 | | Alpha Serpentis (Unukalhai) | Star | |
| 2.64 | 2.60 | Beta Corvi (Kraz) | Star | |
| 2.65 | 2.62 | Theta Aurigae | Binary star system | |
| 2.65 | | Alpha Columbae (Phact) | Star | |
| 2.65 | | Beta Arietis (Sheratan) | Binary star system | |
| 2.65 | | Upsilon Scorpii (Lesath) | Star | |
| 2.668 | | Delta Sagittarii (Kaus Media) | Star | |
| 2.68 | | Beta Lupi | Star | |
| 2.68 | | Eta Boötis | Binary star system | |
| 2.68 | | Andromeda Galaxy | Galaxy | |
| 2.68 | | Delta Cassiopeiae | Binary star system | |
| 2.69 | 2.68 | Alpha Muscae | Star | |
| 2.69 | | Iota Aurigae (Hassaleh) | Star | Suspected variable star |
| 2.69 | | Mu Velorum | Binary star system | |
| 2.72 | | Gamma Aquilae (Tarazed) | Star | |
| 2.73 | | Iota Centauri (Kulou) | Star | |
| 2.75 | | Delta Ophiuchi (Yed Prior) | Star | Suspected variable star |
| 2.74 | | Gamma Virginis (Porrima) | Binary star system | |
| 2.74 | | Eta Draconis | Binary star system | |
| 2.75 | | Alpha^{2} Librae (Zubenelgenubi) | Binary star system | |
| 2.75 | | Beta Ophiuchi (Cebalrai) | Star | Maximum brightness |
| 2.76 | | Theta Carinae | Binary star system | |
| 2.765 | | Gamma Lupi | Triple star system | |
| 2.77 | 2.76 | Beta Herculis (Kornephoros) | Binary star system | |
| 2.77 | 2.76 | Iota Orionis | Quadruple star system | |
| 2.79 | 2.72 | Beta Eridani (Cursa) | Star | |
| 2.79 (Note: Combined magnitude derived from adding the magnitudes of Alpha^{2} Canum Venaticorum (2.88) and Alpha^{1} Canum Venaticorum (5.60) as per the formula: $2.79\approx-2.5\log_{10}\left(10^{-0.4\cdot2.88}+10^{-0.4\cdot5.60}\right)$) | 2.76 (Note: Combined magnitude derived from adding the magnitudes of Alpha^{2} Canum Venaticorum (2.84 maximum) and Alpha^{1} Canum Venaticorum (5.60) as per the formula: $2.76\approx-2.5\log_{10}\left(10^{-0.4\cdot2.84}+10^{-0.4\cdot5.60}\right)$) | Cor Caroli | Binary star system | |
| 2.79 | 2.78 | Delta Crucis (Imai) | Star | |
| 2.79 | | Epsilon Virginis (Vindemiatrix) | Star | |
| 2.79 | | Beta Hydri | Star | |
| 2.800 | | Zeta Herculis (Tianji) | Binary star system | |
| 2.80 | | Pi Puppis | Star | Maximum brightness |
| 2.81 | 2.68 | Rho Puppis (Tureis) | Star | |
| 2.81 | | Beta Draconis | Binary star system | |
| 2.81 | | Tau Scorpii (Paikauhale) | Star | |
| 2.81 | | Lambda Sagittarii (Kaus Borealis) | Star | |
| 2.82 | | Alpha Tucanae (Lang-Exster) | Binary star system | |
| 2.83 | 2.81 | Delta Capricorni | Quadruple star system | |
| 2.84 | 2.78 | Gamma Pegasi (Algenib) | Star | |
| 2.84 | | Beta Leporis (Nihal) | Star | |
| 2.84 | | Alpha Hydri | Star | |
| 2.85 | | Beta Arae | Star | |
| 2.85 | | Zeta Persei | Star | |
| 2.85 | | Beta Trianguli Australis | Star | |
| 2.87 | 2.75 | Mu Geminorum (Tejat) | Star | |
| 2.87 | | Delta Cygni | Triple star system | Suspected variable star |
| 2.87 | | Alcyone | Triple star system | |
| 2.88 | | Pi Sagittarii | Triple star system | |
| 2.88 | | Theta Eridani (Acamar) | Binary star system | |
| 2.89 | 2.84 | Beta Canis Minoris (Gomeisa) | Star | |
| 2.89 | 2.86 | Sigma Scorpii | Quadruple star system | |
| 2.89 | 2.88 | Epsilon Persei (Áldu) | Binary star system | |
| 2.89 | | Gamma Trianguli Australis | Star | |
| 2.89 | | Beta Aquarii (Sadalsuud) | Star | |
| 2.91 | 2.82 | Pi Scorpii | Triple star system | |
| 2.93 | 2.91 | Gamma Persei | Binary star system | |
| 2.93 | | Tau Puppis | Binary star system | |
| 2.94 | 2.88 | Gamma Eridani (Zaurak) | Star | |
| 2.94 | | Delta Corvi (Algorab) | Star | |
| 2.94 | | Alpha Aquarii (Sadalmelik) | Star | |
| 2.95 | 2.79 | Alpha Arae | Star | |
| 2.95 | | Eta Pegasi (Matar) | Binary star system | |
| 2.98 | 2.94 | Mu^{1} Scorpii | Binary star system | |
| 2.98 | 2.95 | Epsilon Leonis | Star | |
| 2.98 | | Epsilon Corvi | Star | |
| 2.98 | | Epsilon Geminorum (Mebsuta) | Star | |
| 2.99 | 2.92 | Epsilon Aurigae | Triple star system | |
| 2.99 | | Zeta Aquilae | Binary star system | |
| 2.99 | | Gamma^{2} Sagittarii (Alnasl) | Star | |
| 2.99 | | Upsilon Carinae | Binary star system | |
| 2.99 | | Zeta Canis Majoris (Furud) | Binary star system | Suspected variable star |
| 2.992 | | Iota^{1} Scorpii | Star | |
| 3.00 | | Gamma Hydrae (Naga) | Star | |
| 3.00 | | Beta Trianguli (Alaybasan) | Binary star system | |
| 3.002 | | Pherkad | Star | |
| 3.01 | | Delta Persei (Sarvvis) | Star | |
| 3.01 | | Psi Ursae Majoris | Star | |
| 3.01 | | Gamma Gruis (Aldhanab) | Star | |
| 3.01 (Note: Combined magnitude derived from adding the magnitudes of Beta^{1} Capricorni (3.08) and Beta^{2} Capricorni (6.10) as per the formula: $3.01\approx-2.5\log_{10}\left(10^{-0.4\cdot3.08}+10^{-0.4\cdot6.10}\right)$) | | Beta Capricorni | Quintuple star system | |
| 3.02 | 2.97 | Omicron^{2} Canis Majoris | Star | |
| 3.03 | 2.88 | Zeta Tauri | Binary star system | |
| 3.04 | 3.02 | Gamma Boötis | Binary star system | |
| 3.04 | | Beta Muscae | Binary star system | |
| 3.05 | | Mu Ursae Majoris (Tania Australis) | Binary star system | Suspected variable star |
| 3.07 | | Delta Draconis (Altais) | Star | |
| 3.076 | | Zeta Arae | Star | |
| 3.08 | 2.74 | Alpha Herculis (Rasalgethi) | Triple star system | |
| 3.08 | | Albireo | Double star | |
| 3.10 | | Zeta Hydrae | Star | |
| 3.11 | 3.05 | Eta Sagittarii | Binary star system | |
| 3.11 | | Alpha Indi | Star | |
| 3.11 | | Nu Hydrae | Star | |
| 3.11 | | Kappa Centauri | Binary star system | |
| 3.12 | | Beta Columbae (Wazn) | Star | |
| 3.13 | | Delta Herculis | Binary star system | |
| 3.139 | 3.12 | HR 3803 | Star | |
| 3.14 | 3.12 | Alpha Lyncis | Star | |
| 3.14 | | Lambda Centauri | Star | |
| 3.14 | | Iota Ursae Majoris (Talitha) | Quadruple star system | |
| 3.140 | | Phi Sagittarii | Star | |
| 3.17 | 3.16 | Nu Puppis (Pipit) | Star | Suspected variable star |
| 3.17 | | Zeta Draconis | Binary star system | |
| 3.18 | | Eta Aurigae (Haedus) | Star | |
| 3.18 | | Epsilon Leporis (Ping) | Star | |
| 3.18 | | Theta Ursae Majoris | Star | Suspected variable star |
| 3.18 | | Pi Herculis (Nüchuang) | Star | Slightly variable |
| 3.19 | 3.18 | Alpha Circini (Xami) | Star | |
| 3.190 | | Pi^{3} Orionis (Tabit) | Star | |
| 3.20 | | Kappa Ophiuchi | Star | Suspected variable star |
| 3.21 | 3.18 | Gamma Cephei | Binary star system | |
| 3.21 | 3.20 | Sigma Librae (Brachium) | Star | |
| 3.21 | | G Scorpii (Fuyue) | Star | |
| 3.21 | | Zeta Cygni (Tianjinnan) | Binary star system | |
| 3.22 | 3.20 | Delta Lupi | Star | |
| 3.22 | | Theta Aquilae (Antinous) | Binary star system | |
| 3.23 | 3.16 | Beta Cephei | Binary star system | |
| 3.23 | | Epsilon Ophiuchi (Yed Posterior) | Star | |
| 3.25 | 3.23 | Sigma Puppis | Binary star system | |
| 3.25 | | Eta Serpentis | Star | |
| 3.250 | | Gamma Lyrae (Sulafat) | Star | |
| 3.26 | 3.22 | Gamma Hydri | Star | |
| 3.26 | 3.25 | Theta Ophiuchi | Triple star system | |
| 3.27 | 3.24 | PP Carinae | Star | |
| 3.28 | 3.15 | Eta Geminorum | Triple star system | |
| 3.28 | 3.26 | Alpha Doradus | Binary star system | |
| 3.28 | | Delta Aquarii (Skat) | Star | |
| 3.28 | | Pi Hydrae | Star | |
| 3.28 | | Delta Andromedae | Binary star system | |
| 3.29 | 2.97 | Mu Leporis (Bade) | Star | |
| 3.29 | | Iota Draconis (Edasich) | Star | Suspected variable star |
| 3.30 | | Alpha Pictoris | Star | |
| 3.30 | | Beta Phoenicis | Binary star system | |
| 3.30 | | Xi Puppis | Triple star system | |
| 3.31 | | Tau Sagittarii | Star | |
| 3.320 | | Megrez | Star | |
| 3.33 | | Eta Scorpii | Star | |
| 3.33 | | Omega Carinae | Star | |
| 3.34 | | Gamma Arae | Star | |
| 3.34 | | Nu Ophiuchi | Star | |
| 3.35 | 3.17 | V337 Carinae | Star | |
| 3.35 | 3.31 | Eta Orionis | Quadruple star system | |
| 3.35 | | Theta Leonis (Chertan) | Star | |
| 3.35 | | Omicron Ursae Majoris (Muscida) | Star | |
| 3.35 | | Zeta Cephei | Star | Suspected variable star |
| 3.36 | | Xi Geminorum (Alzirr) | Star | |
| 3.36 | | Delta Aquilae (Guqi) | Binary star system | Maximum brightness |
| 3.36 | | Alpha Reticuli (Rhombus) | Star | |
| 3.366 | 3.36 | Epsilon Lupi | Binary star system | |
| 3.37 | | Epsilon Cassiopeiae (Segin) | Star | Slightly variable |
| 3.38 | 3.32 | Delta Virginis (Minelauva) | Star | |
| 3.38 | | Epsilon Hydrae | Quintuple star system | |
| 3.38 | | Zeta Virginis | Binary star system | Slightly variable |
| 3.386 | 3.38 | Nu Centauri (Heng) | Binary star system | |
| 3.39 | 3.30 | Rho Persei | Star | |
| 3.39 | | Meissa | Double star | |
| 3.408 | | Beta Pavonis | Star | |
| 3.410 | 3.35 | Theta^{2} Tauri | Binary star system | |
| 3.41 | 3.37 | Lambda Tauri (Bibing) | Triple star system | |
| 3.41 | 3.39 | Gamma Phoenicis | Binary star system | |
| 3.41 | | Zeta Pegasi (Homam) | Star | |
| 3.41 | | Zeta Lupi | Star | |
| 3.41 | | Eta Cephei | Star | |
| 3.41 | | Eta Lupi | Triple star system | |
| 3.41 | | Zeta Leonis (Adhafera) | Double star | |
| 3.42 | 3.25 | Beta Lyrae (Sheliak) | Triple star system | |
| 3.42 | 3.41 | Alpha Trianguli | Binary star system | |
| 3.42 | | Mu Herculis | Quadruple star system | |
| 3.43 | 2.92 | Mu Centauri | Star | |
| 3.43 | 3.41 | V357 Carinae | Binary star system | |
| 3.43 | | Lambda Aquilae | Star | |
| 3.431 | | Chi Carinae | Star | |
| 3.44 | | Eta Cassiopeiae | Binary star system | Suspected variable star |
| 3.45 | | Lambda Ursae Majoris (Tania Borealis) | Star | |
| 3.45 | | Eta Ceti | Star | |
| 3.466 | | Epsilon Gruis | Star | |
| 3.47 | 3.41 | Sigma Canis Majoris (Nganurganity) | Star | |
| 3.47 | | Gamma Sagittae (Telum) | Star | |
| 3.47 | | Gamma Ceti | Triple star system | |
| 3.48 | | Eta Leonis | Multiple star system | |
| 3.48 | | Mu Pegasi (Sadalbari) | Star | |
| 3.49 | 3.47 | Beta Boötis (Nekkar) | Star | |
| 3.49 | | Alpha Telescopii | Star | Suspected variable star |
| 3.49 | | Nu Ursae Majoris (Alula Borealis) | Star | |
| 3.49 | | Delta Boötis (Qigong) | Double star | |
| 3.50 | | Tau Ceti | Star | |
| 3.50 | | Eta Herculis | Star | |
| 3.51 | | Xi^{2} Sagittarii | Star | |
| 3.519 | | Xi Serpentis | Triple star system | |
| 3.52 | | Beta Cancri (Tarf) | Binary star system | Suspected variable star |
| 3.52 | | Phi Velorum | Star | |
| 3.52 | | Omicron Leonis | Binary star system | |
| 3.53 | | Epsilon Tauri (Ain) | Star | |
| 3.53 | | Mu Serpentis | Binary star system | |
| 3.53 | | Delta Geminorum (Wasat) | Triple star system | |
| 3.54 | | Iota Cephei | Star | |
| 3.54 | | Xi Hydrae | Star | |
| 3.54 | | Delta Eridani (Rana) | Star | Suspected variable star |
| 3.54 | | Iota Lupi | Star | Maximum brightness |
| 3.546 | | Phi^{1} Lupi | Star | |
| 3.55 | 3.54 | Iota Ceti | Star | |
| 3.55 | | Theta Pegasi (Biham) | Binary star system | |
| 3.55 | | Kappa Ursae Majoris | Binary star system | |
| 3.559 | | Lambda Geminorum | Triple star system | |
| 3.56 | | Upsilon^{4} Eridani | Binary star system | |
| 3.56 | | Delta Pavonis | Star | |
| 3.56 | | Delta Crateris | Star | |
| 3.56 | | Mu^{2} Scorpii (Pipirima) | Star | |
| 3.57 | | Epsilon Crucis (Ginan) | Star | |
| 3.57 | | Phi Eridani | Star | |
| 3.57 | | Kappa Geminorum | Binary star system | |
| 3.57 | | 51 Andromedae (Nembus) | Star | |
| 3.58 | | Alpha^{2} Capricorni (Algedi) | Triple star system | |
| 3.580 | | Chi Draconis | Binary star system | |
| 3.581 | | Eta Pavonis | Star | |
| 3.589 | | Upsilon Librae | Star | |
| 3.59 | | Rho Boötis (Kalasungsang) | Star | |
| 3.59 | | Tau Orionis | Star | |
| 3.59 | | Theta Ceti | Star | |
| 3.60 | | Gamma Leporis | Star | |
| 3.60 | | Theta Geminorum | Star | |
| 3.60 | | Psi Velorum | Binary star system | |
| 3.60 | | Beta Virginis (Zavijava) | Star | |
| 3.600 | | Omicron Tauri | Binary star system | |
| 3.61 | | Lambda Hydrae | Binary star system | |
| 3.61 | | Delta Muscae | Binary star system | |
| 3.61 | | HD 63032 | Binary star system | |
| 3.62 | | Delta Arae | Star | |
| 3.620 | | Eta Piscium | Binary star system | |
| 3.63 | 3.55 | Omicron Velorum | Star | |
| 3.63 | | Beta Delphini | Binary star system | |
| 3.76 | 3.73 | Nu Octantis | Binary Star System | |
| 3.82 | 3.5 | Beta Doradus | Star | |
| 3.87 | 3.480 | Eta Aquilae (Pagru) | Triple star system | |
| 3.88 | –1 | Eta Carinae | Binary star system | |
| 3.89 | 3.42 | Kappa Canis Majoris | Star | |
| 3.9 | | Omega Centauri | Globular cluster | |
| 3.92 | | Alpha Fornacis | Triple star system | |
| 3.97 | | Delta Volantis | Star | |
| 3.97 | | 98 Aquarii | Star | |
| 3.99 | | Gamma Tucanae | Star or binary star system | |
| 4 | | Alpha Volantis | Binary star system | |
| 4.04 | 3.98 | Tau^{2} Aquarii | Star | |
| 4.06 | 3.35 | HD 84810 | Star | |
| 4.07 | 3.48 | Delta Cephei | Quadruple star system | |
| 4.24 | 3.3 | Chi Cygni | Star | |
| 4.97 | 3.5 | R Hydrae | Star | |
| 5.47 | 5.42 | Sigma Octantis | Star | |
| 5.68 | 5.38 | Uranus | Planet | |
| 6.53 | 2.0 | Mira | Binary star system | |
| 6.79 | 5.1 | 4 Vesta | Asteroid | |

== See also ==
- Apparent magnitude
- Bayer designation
- Extraterrestrial sky
- Historical brightest stars
- List of brightest stars
- List of nearest bright stars
- List of nearest stars and brown dwarfs
