= Zeta Geminorum =

Star in the constellation Gemini

ζ Geminorum
- Location of ζ Geminorum (circled)

Observation data Epoch J2000 Equinox ICRS
- Constellation: Gemini
- Right ascension: 07^{h} 04^{m} 06.53079^{s}
- Declination: +20° 34′ 13.0739″
- Apparent magnitude (V): 3.93 (3.68 to 4.16)

Characteristics
- Spectral type: F7Ib to G3Ib
- U−B color index: +0.55
- B−V color index: 0.88
- Variable type: Classical Cepheid

Astrometry
Radial velocity (R_{v})	+6.7 km/s
Proper motion (μ)	RA: −7.29 mas/yr Dec.: −0.41 mas/yr
Parallax (π)	2.78±0.18 mas
Distance	1,120 ly (368 pc)
Absolute magnitude (M_{V})	-3.99

Details
Mass	7.7 ± 0.3 M_{☉}
Radius	72±3 R_{☉}
Luminosity	4,413±332 L_{☉}
Surface gravity (log g)	1.51–1.57 cgs
Temperature	5,222–5,765 K
Metallicity [Fe/H]	0.16 dex
Rotational velocity (v sin i)	19 km/s
Age	70 ± 25 Myr

Other designations
- Mekbuda, ζ Gem, 43 Gem, BD+20°1687, FK5 269, HD 52973, HIP 34088, HR 2650, SAO 79031, WDS J07041+2034A

Database references
SIMBAD	data

Zeta Geminorum (ζ Geminorum, abbreviated Zeta Gem, ζ Gem) is a bright star with cluster components, distant optical components and a likely spectroscopic partner in the zodiac constellation of Gemini — in its south, on the left 'leg' of the twin Pollux. It is a classical Cepheid variable star, of which over 800 have been found in our galaxy. As such its regular pulsation and luminosity (proven in its class to correspond) and its relative proximity means the star is a useful calibrator in computing the cosmic distance ladder. Based on parallax measurements, it is approximately 1,200 light-years from the Sun.

Zeta Geminorum is the primary or 'A' component of a multiple star system designated WDS J07041+2034. It bears the traditional name Mekbuda, usually anglicised to /mɛkˈbjuːdə/.

== Nomenclature ==
ζ Geminorum (Latinised to Zeta Geminorum) is the star's Bayer designation. WDS J07041+2034 A is its designation in the Washington Double Star Catalog. The designations of the two components as WDS J03158-0849 Aa and Ab derive from the convention used by the Washington Multiplicity Catalog (WMC) for multiple star systems, and adopted by the International Astronomical Union (IAU).

Zeta Geminorum bore the traditional name Mekbuda, from an Arabic phrase meaning "the lion's folded paw" (Zeta and Epsilon Geminorum (Mebsuta) were the paws of a lion). In 2016, the International Astronomical Union organized a Working Group on Star Names (WGSN) to catalogue and standardize proper names for stars. The WGSN decided to attribute proper names to individual stars rather than entire multiple systems. It approved the name Mekbuda for the component WDS J07041+2034 Aa on 12 September 2016 and it is now so included in the List of IAU-approved Star Names.

In Chinese, 井宿 (Jǐng Su), meaning Well (asterism) consists of eight stars in Gemini: Zeta, Mu, Gamma, Nu, Xi, Epsilon, 36 and Lambda. Zeta is 井宿七 (Jǐng Su qī, English: the Seventh Star of Well).

== Observation history ==
In 1844, German astronomer Julius Schmidt discovered that Zeta Geminorum varies in brightness with a period of about 10 days, although it had been suspected of variability as early as 1790. It was recognised as being related to the Cepheid class of variable stars, although was often treated as the prototype of its own class, the Geminids, because of its symmetrical light curve.

In 1899, American astronomer W. W. Campbell announced the star to have a variable radial velocity. (This variation was independently discovered by Russian astronomer Aristarkh Belopolsky, published in 1901.) Based on his observations, Campbell later published orbital elements for the binary. However, he found that the curve departed from a keplerian orbit and even suggested that it was a triple star system to explain the irregularities. The periodic variation in radial velocity of the Cepheid variables was later explained as being due to pulsations in the atmosphere of the star.

The periodicity of the star is itself variable, a trend first noted by German astronomer Paul Guthnick in 1920, who suspected that the period change was the result of an orbiting companion. In 1930, Danish astronomer Axel Nielsen suggested that the change was instead the result in a steady decrease of about 3.6 seconds per year in the period.

== Companions ==
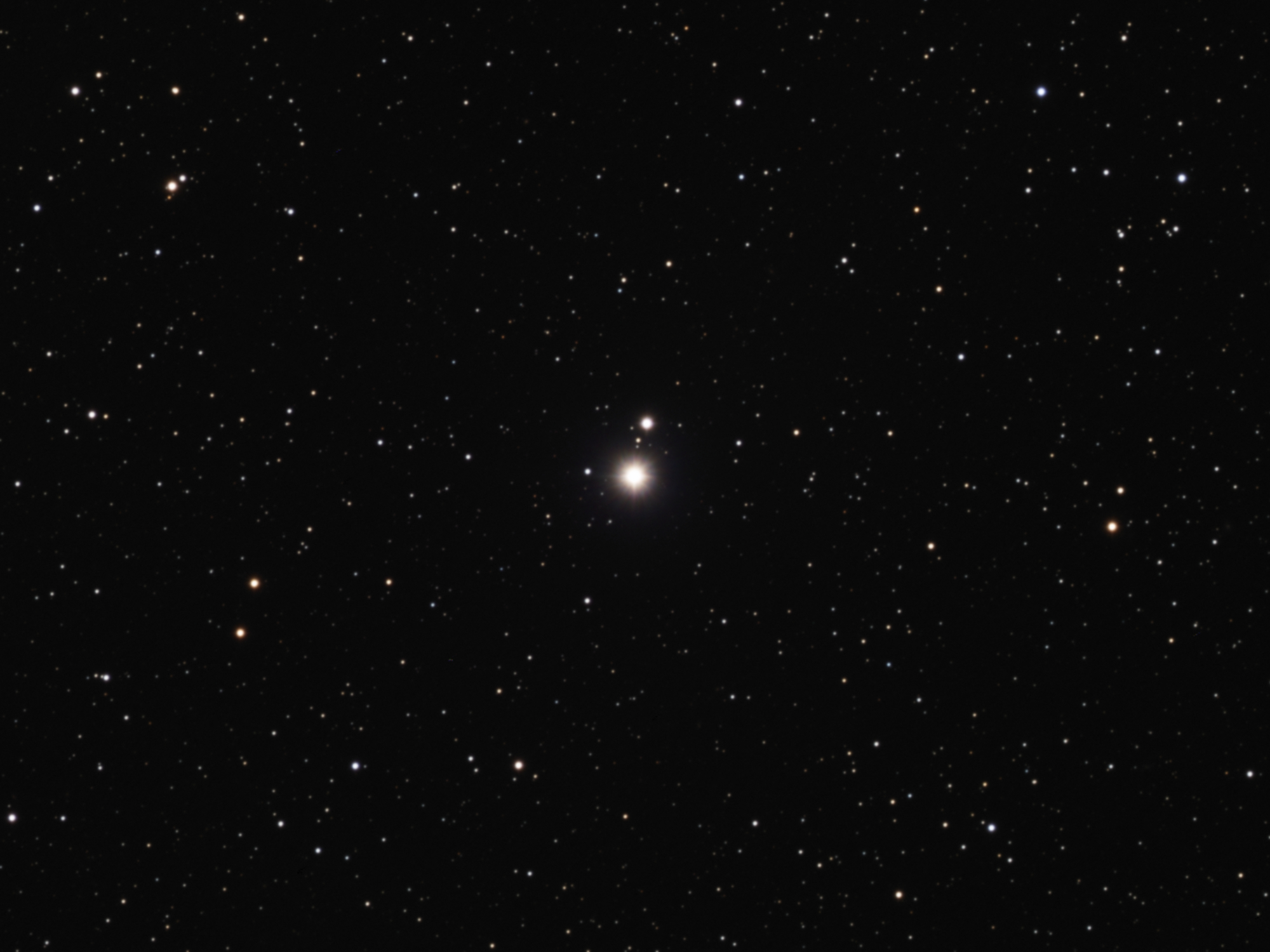
ζ Geminorum in optical light, with the companions B, C, and D visible close by

Zeta Geminorum has three visible companions known since the 19th century and listed in the Washington Double Star Catalog as B, C, and D. More recently, a possible spectroscopic companion has been listed, further faint stars close by have been catalogued, and a diffuse cluster has been identified as including Zeta Geminorum.

The brightest nearby star, WDS J07041+2034 C, is the magnitude 7.6 HD 268518, 91.9" away when discovered in 1779 and 101.3" distant in 2008. It is a foreground object, only a tenth the distance of Zeta Geminorum and a high proper motion star moving rapidly compared to the more distant stars. It is a G1 main sequence star very similar to the sun.

The closest visible companion is WDS J07041+2034 D, a 12th magnitude star measured to be 67.8" away in 2008. It was 80" distant when first measured in 1905. It appears on the sky between Zeta Geminorum and component C, but is a more distant object than either.

WDS J07041+2034 B is an 11th magnitude star, 76.0" distant in 1831 and 87.4" in 2008. It is itself a spectroscopic binary, although little is known about the two components. The combined spectrum is of an F4 main sequence star. It is thought to be physically associated with the supergiant primary and a member of a loose cluster of stars around Zeta Geminorum.

A combination of photometry, spectroscopy, and astrometry has identified 26 stars approximately 355 parsecs away, which are likely to be members of the birth cluster of Zeta Geminorum. The brightest are late B and early A giant stars such as the 7th magnitude stars HD 49381 and HD 50634, while the faintest detected cluster members are 12th magnitude class F main sequence stars including WDS J07041+2034 B.

== Properties ==
Zeta Geminorum has been reported to be a spectroscopic binary on the basis of lunar occultation observations, but this has not been confirmed by other methods.

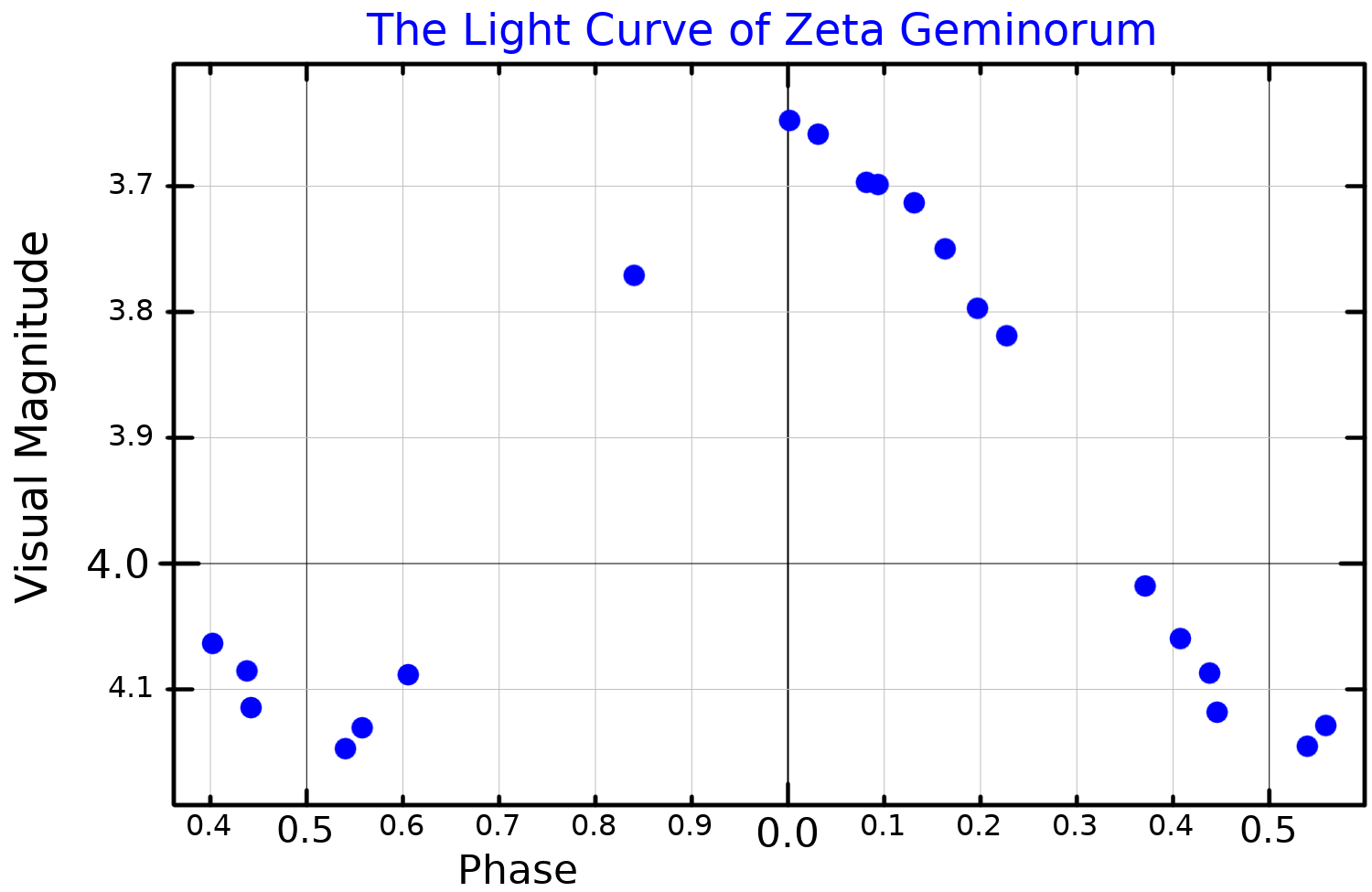
A visual band light curve for Zeta Geminorum, adapted from Kiss (1998)

Zeta Geminorum's primary (WDS J07041+2034 Aa) is a Classical Cepheid variable that undergoes regular, periodic variation in brightness because of radial pulsations. In the V band, the apparent magnitude varies between a high of 3.68 and a low of 4.16 (with a mean of 3.93) over a period of 10.148 days. This period of variation is decreasing at the rate of 3.1 seconds per year, or 0.085 seconds per cycle. The spectral classification varies between F7Ib and G3Ib over the course of a pulsation cycle. Likewise the effective temperature of the outer envelope varies between 5,765 K and 5,222 K, while the radius varies from 61 to 69 times the Sun's radius. On average, it is radiating about 2,900 times the luminosity of the Sun.

Membership of a cluster provides independent validation of distances determined using recent Hubble Space Telescope and Hipparcos parallaxes. This strongly constrains the star's distance: 363 ± 9(σ_{x̄}) ± 26(σ) parsecs. Zeta Geminorum is thus an important calibrator for the Cepheid period–luminosity relation used for establishing the cosmic distance ladder. The Gaia Data Release 2 parallax of 2.2497±0.3006 mas suggests the distance is towards the top end of this range, and has a comparable margin of error.
