= Epsilon Geminorum =

Star in the constellation Gemini

ε Geminorum
- Location of ε Geminorum (circled)

Observation data Epoch J2000 Equinox ICRS
- Constellation: Gemini
- Right ascension: 06^{h} 43^{m} 55.927^{s}
- Declination: +25° 07′ 52.06″
- Apparent magnitude (V): +3.06

Characteristics
- Spectral type: G8 Ib
- U−B color index: +1.46
- B−V color index: +1.40

Astrometry
Radial velocity (R_{v})	+8.09±0.14 km/s
Proper motion (μ)	RA: −4.835 mas/yr Dec.: −11.78 mas/yr
Parallax (π)	3.748±0.184 mas
Distance	861+52 −39 ly (264+16 −12 pc)
Absolute magnitude (M_{V})	−4.33±0.10

Details
Mass	5.29±0.04 – 8.2±0.82 M_{☉}
Radius	136.39±6.33 R_{☉}
Luminosity	6,980 L_{☉}
Surface gravity (log g)	0.76–1.38 cgs
Temperature	4,591±11 K
Metallicity [Fe/H]	0.15±0.07 dex
Rotational velocity (v sin i)	9.08 km/s
Age	100 Myr

Other designations
- Epsilon Gem, ε Gem, 27 Geminorum, FK5 254, HD 48329, HIP 32246, HR 2473, SAO 78682

Database references
SIMBAD	data

Epsilon Geminorum or ε Geminorum, formally named Mebsuta /mɛbˈsuːtə/, is a star in the constellation of Gemini, on the outstretched right 'leg' of the twin Castor. The apparent visual magnitude of +3.06 makes it one of the brighter stars in this constellation. The distance to this star is determined at 860 light-years (260 parsecs).

== Nomenclature ==
ε Geminorum (Latinised to Epsilon Geminorum) is the star's Bayer designation. It bore the traditional names Mebsuta, Melboula or Melucta. Mebsuta has its roots in an ancient Arabian view where it and the star Mekbuda (Zeta Geminorum) were the paws of a huge lion extending over many present-day constellations. Mebsuta ('Mabsūṭah' مبسوطة) comes from a phrase referring to the outstretched paw. In 2016, the International Astronomical Union organized a Working Group on Star Names (WGSN) to catalog and standardize proper names for stars. The WGSN's first bulletin of July 2016 included a table of the first two batches of names approved by the WGSN; which included Mebsuta for this star.

In Chinese, 井宿 (Jǐng Su), meaning Well (asterism), refers to an asterism consisting of ε Geminorum, μ Geminorum, ν Geminorum, γ Geminorum, ξ Geminorum, 36 Geminorum, ζ Geminorum and λ Geminorum. Consequently, ε Geminorum itself is known as 井宿五 (Jǐng Su wǔ, English: the Fifth Star of Well.)

== Properties ==
At Epsilon Geminorum's distance, extinction from interstellar dust is causing a magnitude reduction of 0.27. The spectrum of this star matches a stellar classification of G8 Ib, where the luminosity class of Ib indicates this is a lower luminosity supergiant star. Alternatively, it may be a star that has passed through the asymptotic giant branch stage and possesses a detached shell of dust. It has 5.3 times the mass of the Sun and it is estimated to be 100 million years old. Since 1943, the spectrum of this star has served as one of the stable anchor points by which other stars are classified.

The radius of Epsilon Geminorum has been directly measured using interferometry with the CHARA Array, which yields a result of 137±6 times the radius of the Sun at the star's distance. It is radiating around 7,000 times the luminosity of the Sun from its outer atmosphere at an effective temperature of 4,591 K. It is this temperature that gives it the yellow-hued glow of a G-type star. A surface magnetic field with a strength of −0.14±0.19 G has been detected on this star. This topologically complex field is most likely generated by a dynamo formed from the deep convection zone in the star's outer envelope.

== Occultations ==
Epsilon Geminorum lies near the ecliptic, so it can be occulted by the Moon or a planet. Such an occultation took place on April 8, 1976 by Mars, which allowed the oblateness of the planet's outer atmosphere to be measured. Epsilon Geminorum was occulted by Mercury on June 10, 1940, and on September 3, 2015 it was occulted by the asteroid 112 Iphigenia.

== In culture ==
USS Melucta (AK-131) was a United States Navy Crater-class cargo ship named after the star.
