= USS Propus =

Liberty ship of WWII

History

United States
- Name: Frederick Tresca
- Namesake: Frederick Tresca
- Owner: War Shipping Administration (WSA)
- Ordered: as a type (EC2-S-C1) hull, MC hull 2471
- Awarded: 23 April 1943
- Builder: St. Johns River Shipbuilding Company, Jacksonville, Florida
- Cost: $1,124,835
- Yard number: 35
- Way number: 5
- Laid down: 31 January 1944
- Launched: 29 March 1944
- Sponsored by: Lt. Virginia P. Tresca
- Completed: 10 April 1944
- Fate: Transferred to US Navy, 10 April 1944

United States
- Name: Propus
- Namesake: The star Propus
- Acquired: 10 April 1944
- Commissioned: 22 June 1944
- Decommissioned: 20 November 1945
- Stricken: 5 December 1945
- Identification: Hull symbol: AK-132; Call sign: NHEH
- Fate: Sold for commercial use, 3 February 1947, removed from fleet, 17 February 1947
- Notes: Name reverted to Frederick Tresca when laid up in Reserve Fleet

Greece
- Name: Nicolaou Georgios
- Owner: Nicolas G. Nicolaou
- Fate: Abandoned, 24 May 1951

Italy
- Name: Gabbiano
- Owner: Achille Lauro
- Acquired: 1951
- Fate: Scrapped, 1969

General characteristics
- Class & type: Crater-class cargo ship
- Displacement: 4,023 long tons (4,088 t) (standard); 14,550 long tons (14,780 t) (full load)
- Length: 441 ft 6 in (134.57 m)
- Beam: 56 ft 11 in (17.35 m)
- Draft: 28 ft 4 in (8.64 m)
- Installed power: 2 × Oil fired 450 °F (232 °C) boilers, operating at 220 psi (1,500 kPa) , (manufactured by Combustion Engineering); 2,500 shp (1,900 kW)
- Propulsion: 1 × Vertical triple-expansion reciprocating steam engine, (manufactured by General Machinery Corp., Hamilton, Ohio); 1 × screw propeller
- Speed: 12.5 kn (23.2 km/h; 14.4 mph)
- Capacity: 7,800 t (7,700 long tons) DWT; 444,206 cu ft (12,578.5 m^{3}) (non-refrigerated)
- Complement: 206
- Armament: 1 × 5 in (127 mm)/38 caliber dual-purpose (DP) gun; 1 × 3 in (76 mm)/50 caliber DP gun; 2 × 40 mm (1.57 in) Bofors anti-aircraft (AA) gun mounts; 6 × 20 mm (0.79 in) Oerlikon cannon AA gun mounts

USS Propus (AK-132) was a Crater-class cargo ship, converted from a Liberty Ship, commissioned by the US Navy for service in World War II. She was first named after Frederick Tresca, a French-born lighthouse keeper, sea captain, pioneer shipping man, and Union blockade runner in Florida. She was renamed and commissioned after Propus, a star in the constellation Gemini. She was responsible for delivering troops, goods and equipment to locations in the war zone.

== Construction ==
Frederick Tresca was laid down 31 January 1944, under Maritime Commission (MARCOM) contract, MC hull 2471, by the St. Johns River Shipbuilding Company, Jacksonville, Florida; she was sponsored by Lieutenant Virginia P. Tresca, the great-granddaughter of the namesake, and launched 29 March 1944; chartered by the US Navy, 10 April 1944; she was converted by Merrill-Stevens Drydock & Repair Co., Jacksonville; and commissioned 22 June 1944.

== Service history ==
Following shakedown in Chesapeake Bay, Propus proceeded via the Panama Canal, to the Pacific Ocean. In 1944, she operated at San Francisco, California, in September; Pearl Harbor and San Francisco, in October; and San Pedro, in December. In 1945, her cargo duties took her to Noumea and Espiritu Santo, in January; Pearl Harbor, San Francisco, and back to sea in February and March; Eniwetok, Saipan, and Tinian in April; San Francisco in May; Manus in June; Emirau and Manus in July; Pearl Harbor in August; San Francisco in September; and Norfolk, Virginia, in October 1945.

== Decommissioning ==
Decommissioned 20 November 1945, she was redelivered to the War Shipping Administration 21 November, and struck from the Naval Vessel Register 5 December. Her name reverted to Frederick Tresca, and she entered the James River Reserve Fleet, in Lee Hall, Virginia. She was struck from the Navy List 5 December 1945. She was sold for commercial use to Nicolas G. Nicolaou, 17 March 1947, for $544,506. She was withdrawn from the fleet on 20 March 1947.

== Merchant service ==
Frederick Tresca was renamed Nicolaou Georgios and reflagged in Greece. She was abandoned in the Red Sea, on 24 May 1951, because of a fire. She was towed to Suez by SS Montebello Hills and declared a total loss. Achille Lauro bought her in 1951, and had her towed to Italy, for repair and to be re-engined at Trieste. She was refitted with a 3,000 bhp (2,200 kW) Babcock & Wilcox diesel engine that had been built by Harland and Wolff in 1940. Nicolaou Gerogios was renamed Gabbiano and reflagged in Italy. She was scrapped in 1970.

== Military awards and honors ==
No battle stars are indicated for Propus in current Navy accounts. However, her crew was eligible for the following medals:

- American Campaign Medal
- Asiatic-Pacific Campaign Medal
- World War II Victory Medal

== Bibliography ==
- "St. John's River Shipbuilding, Jacksonville FL". www.ShipbuildingHistory.com. 16 October 2010.
- Maritime Administration. "Frederick Tresca". Ship History Database Vessel Status Card. U.S. Department of Transportation, Maritime Administration.
- "USS Propus (AK-132)". NavSource. 11 July 2014.
- "Propus". Dictionary of American Naval Fighting Ships. Naval History and Heritage Command. 25 August 2015. This article incorporates text from this source, which is in the public domain.
- "SS Frederick Tresca".
