= Beta Cancri b =

Gas giant exoplanet orbiting Beta Cancri

Discovery
- Discovered by: B-C Lee et al.
- Discovery date: 2014
- Detection method: Doppler spectroscopy (Radial velocity)

Orbital characteristics
- Semi-major axis: 1.7±0.1 AU
- Eccentricity: 0.08±0.02
- Orbital period (sidereal): 605.2±4.0 days 1.66 years
- Star: Beta Cancri

Physical characteristics
- Mean radius: 1.12 R_{J} (estimate)
- Mass: ≥7.8±0.8 M_{J}

Beta Cancri b is a gas giant exoplanet that orbits the K-type giant Beta Cancri. Its mass is 7.8 Jupiter masses, it takes 1.7 years to complete one orbit of its star, and is 1.7 astronomical units from its star, on a nearly circular orbit.

== Discovery ==
How the radial velocity method works

First evidence for a planet around Beta Cancri was presented in 2008, when variations of the host star's radial velocity with a period of 673 days, but at that time an explanation to the radial velocity variations (such as a planet) wasn't presented. In 2014, Lee et al. found further evidence for the planet's existence, finding a different period of 605.2 days. After ruling out alternative explanations for the radial velocity variations, such as stellar variability, its existence could be confirmed.

Beta Cancri b was discovered with doppler spectroscopy, also known as the radial velocity method, which consists on observing small variations in the star's spectrum, which are radial velocity variations and happen because the planet is able to gravitationally pull its host star.

== Host star ==
Beta Cancri (Altarf), the brightest star in Cancer, is one of the largest stars known to host exoplanets. It is a K-type giant with 70% more mass than the Sun but a diameter 50 times larger. It cooled to an effective temperature of 4,100 K, which is 1,700 degrees cooler than the Sun, but is 700 times more luminous than the Sun. It can be seen close to Procyon, which outshine it.

== See also ==
- Hamal, Beta Ursae Minoris, Mu Leonis and Gamma^{1} Leonis, other giant stars with exoplanets
