= USS Melucta =

Liberty ship of WWII

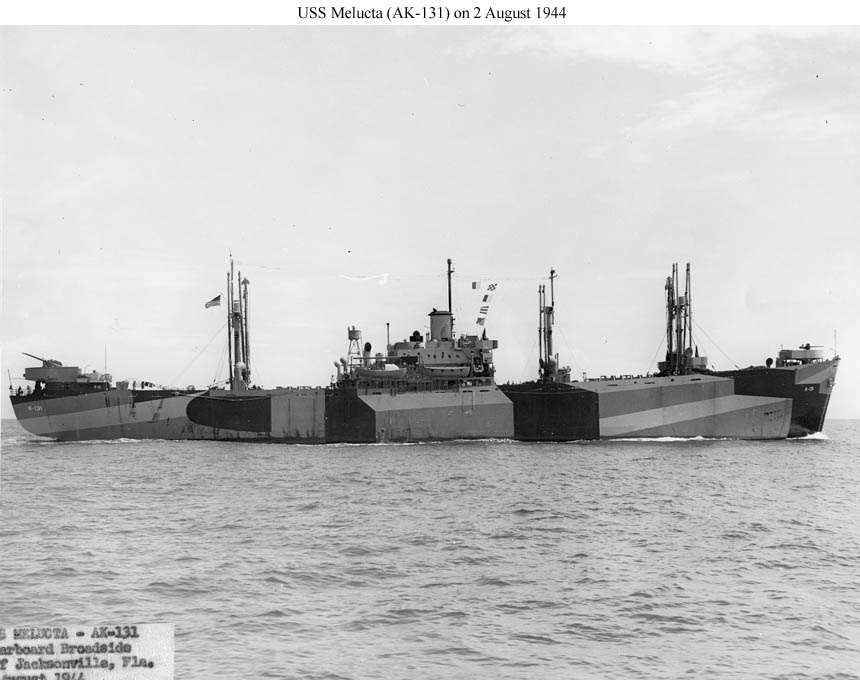
- USS Melucta (AK-131) underway, 2 August 1944, off Jacksonville, Florida.

History

United States
- Name: Thomas A. McGinley
- Namesake: Thomas A. McGinley
- Owner: War Shipping Administration (WSA)
- Ordered: as a type (EC2-S-C1) hull, MC hull 2470
- Awarded: 23 April 1943
- Builder: St. Johns River Shipbuilding Company, Jacksonville, Florida
- Cost: $1,156,379
- Yard number: 34
- Way number: 4
- Laid down: 21 January 1944
- Launched: 20 March 1944
- Sponsored by: Mrs. McGinley
- Completed: 31 March 1944
- Fate: Transferred to US Navy, 31 March 1944

United States
- Name: Melucta
- Namesake: The star Melucta
- Acquired: 31 March 1944
- Commissioned: 22 July 1944
- Decommissioned: 13 December 1945
- Stricken: 3 January 1946
- Identification: Hull symbol: AK-131; Call sign: NHCO
- Fate: Sold for scrapping, 24 March 1970, removed from fleet, 20 July 1970
- Notes: Name reverted to Thomas A. McGinley when laid up in Reserve Fleet

General characteristics
- Class & type: Crater-class cargo ship
- Displacement: 4,023 long tons (4,088 t) (standard); 14,550 long tons (14,780 t) (full load)
- Length: 441 ft 6 in (134.57 m)
- Beam: 56 ft 11 in (17.35 m)
- Draft: 28 ft 4 in (8.64 m)
- Installed power: 2 × Oil fired 450 °F (232 °C) boilers, operating at 220 psi (1,500 kPa) , (manufactured by Combustion Engineering); 2,500 shp (1,900 kW)
- Propulsion: 1 × triple-expansion steam engine, (manufactured by Filer and Stowell, Milwaukee, Wisconsin); 1 × screw propeller
- Speed: 12.5 kn (23.2 km/h; 14.4 mph)
- Capacity: 7,800 t (7,700 long tons) DWT; 444,206 cu ft (12,578.5 m^{3}) (non-refrigerated)
- Complement: 213
- Armament: 1 × 5 in (130 mm)/38-caliber dual-purpose gun; 1 × 3 in (76 mm)/50-caliber dual-purpose gun; 6 × 20 mm (0.79 in) Oerlikon cannons anti-aircraft gun mounts

USS Melucta (AK-131) was a Crater-class cargo ship, converted from a Liberty Ship, commissioned by the US Navy for service in World War II. She was first named after Thomas A. McGinley, the president of the Duff-Norton Manufacturing Co., and inventor of an improved high-speed screw jack and lifting machinery. She was renamed and commissioned after Melucta, a star in the constellation Gemini. She was responsible for delivering troops, goods and equipment to locations in the war zone.

== Construction ==
Thomas A. McGinley was laid down on 21 January 1944, under Maritime Commission (MARCOM) contract, MC hull 2470, by the St. Johns River Shipbuilding Company, Jacksonville, Florida; she was sponsored by Mrs. Thomas A. McGinley, the widow of the namesake, and launched 20 March 1944. She was acquired by the US Navy as Melucta from WSA under bareboat charter 31 March 1944; converted from a freighter by Gibbs Gas Engine Co., Jacksonville; and commissioned 22 July 1944.

== Service history ==
Following shakedown off Norfolk, Virginia, Melucta, was assigned to Naval Transportation Service, 17 August, for cargo carrying duties along the U.S. East Coast into the fall. By 10 November, she was en route to the Marshalls, towing USS Cinnabar (IX-163) to Pearl Harbor, before continuing on to Ebon Atoll.

The cargo ship operated in the South Pacific Ocean for the next year. Melucta steamed to San Francisco, California, in May 1945, for repairs and reloading, departing the first week of June. In mid October she got underway for the U.S. East Coast via the Panama Canal Zone, arriving Norfolk, Virginia, 28 November.

== Decommissioning ==
Melucta was decommissioned there 13 December, and was delivered to War Shipping Administration 5 days later. Her name reverted to Thomas A. McGinley, and she entered the James River Reserve Fleet, in Lee Hall, Virginia. She was struck from the Navy List 3 January 1946. She was sold for scrapping to Revalorizacion de Materiales, SA, on 24 March 1970, for $106,500. She was withdrawn from the fleet on 20 July 1970.

== Military awards and honors ==
No battle stars are indicated for Melucta in current Navy accounts. However, her crew was eligible for the following medals:

- American Campaign Medal
- Asiatic-Pacific Campaign Medal
- World War II Victory Medal

== Bibliography ==
- "St. John's River Shipbuilding, Jacksonville FL". www.ShipbuildingHistory.com. 16 October 2010.
- Maritime Administration. "Thomas A. McGinley". Ship History Database Vessel Status Card. U.S. Department of Transportation, Maritime Administration.
- "USS Melucta (AK-131)". NavSource. 11 July 2014.
- "Melucta". Dictionary of American Naval Fighting Ships. Naval History and Heritage Command. 7 August 2015. This article incorporates text from this source, which is in the public domain.
- "SS Thomas A. McGinley".
