= Xi Geminorum =

Star in the constellation Gemini

ξ Geminorum
- Location of ξ Geminorum (circled in red)

Observation data Epoch J2000.0 Equinox J2000.0 (ICRS)
- Constellation: Gemini
- Right ascension: 06^{h} 45^{m} 17.36432^{s}
- Declination: +12° 53′ 44.1311″
- Apparent magnitude (V): 3.35

Characteristics
- Spectral type: F5 IV-V
- U−B color index: +0.06
- B−V color index: +0.43

Astrometry
Radial velocity (R_{v})	+25.6 km/s
Proper motion (μ)	RA: −115.73 mas/yr Dec.: −190.55 mas/yr
Parallax (π)	55.56±0.19 mas
Distance	58.7 ± 0.2 ly (18.00 ± 0.06 pc)
Absolute magnitude (M_{V})	2.14

Details
Mass	1.706±0.012 M_{☉}
Radius	2.710±0.021 R_{☉}
Luminosity	11.574±0.238 L_{☉}
Surface gravity (log g)	3.81±0.02 cgs
Temperature	6,480±39 K
Metallicity [Fe/H]	0.00±0.01 dex
Rotational velocity (v sin i)	66.1±3.3 km/s
Age	1.5 Gyr

Other designations
- Alzirr, ξ Gem, 31 Gem, BD+13 1396, FK5 256, GJ 242, HD 48737, HIP 32362, HR 2484, SAO 96074

Database references
SIMBAD	data

Xi Geminorum (ξ Geminorum, abbreviated Xi Gem, ξ Gem), formally named Alzirr /ˈælzər/, is a star in the zodiac constellation of Gemini. It forms one of the four feet of the outline demarcating the Gemini twins. The star has an apparent visual magnitude of 3.35, which is bright enough for it to be seen with the naked eye. From stellar parallax measurements, its distance from the Sun can be estimated as 58.7 light-years (18.0 parsecs).

== Nomenclature ==
ξ Geminorum (Latinised to Xi Geminorum) is the star's Bayer designation.

It bore the traditional name of Al Zirr or Alzirr, from the Arabic الزِرّ al-zirr "the button". In 2016, the IAU organized a Working Group on Star Names (WGSN) to catalog and standardize proper names for stars. The WGSN approved the name Alzirr for this star on 30 June 2017 and it is now so included in the List of IAU-approved Star Names.

This star, along with Gamma Geminorum (Alhena), Mu Geminorum, Nu Geminorum and Eta Geminorum were al-hanʽah "the brand" (on the neck of the camel). They also were associated in al-nuḥātai, the dual form of al-nuḥāt, "the camel's hump".

In Chinese, 井宿 (Jǐng Su), meaning Well (asterism), refers to an asterism consisting of Xi Geminorum, Mu Geminorum, Nu Geminorum, Gamma Geminorum, Epsilon Geminorum, 36 Geminorum, Zeta Geminorum and Lambda Geminorum. Consequently, Xi Geminorum itself is known as 井宿四 (Jǐng Su sì, English: the Fourth Star of Well.)

== Properties ==
Although generally considered a single star, there is some evidence that Xi Geminorum may instead be a spectroscopic binary system consisting of two component stars of equal mass.

Xi Geminorum has a stellar classification of F5 IV-V, which is subgiant star that is in the process of evolving away from the main sequence of stars like the Sun. It has about 162% of the Sun's mass and is radiating more than 11 times the luminosity of the Sun. This energy is being emitted from the outer envelope of the star at an effective temperature of 6,464 K. This causes the star to take on the yellow-white hue common to F-type stars.

X-ray emission has been detected from this star, which has an estimated X-ray luminosity of 1.06×10^{29} erg/s. It has the spectroscopic signature of a rapidly rotating star, with a projected rotational velocity of about 66 km/s.
