= Mu Geminorum =

Star in the constellation Gemini

μ Geminorum
- Location of μ Geminorum (circled)

Observation data Epoch J2000.0 Equinox ICRS
- Constellation: Gemini
- Right ascension: 06^{h} 22^{m} 57.62686^{s}
- Declination: +22° 30′ 48.8979″
- Apparent magnitude (V): 2.75 - 3.02

Characteristics
- Evolutionary stage: AGB
- Spectral type: M3 III
- U−B color index: +1.924
- B−V color index: +1.643
- Variable type: LB

Astrometry
Radial velocity (R_{v})	+54.38±0.24 km/s
Proper motion (μ)	RA: +56.39 mas/yr Dec.: −110.03 mas/yr
Parallax (π)	14.08±0.71 mas
Distance	230 ± 10 ly (71 ± 4 pc)
Absolute magnitude (M_{V})	−1.42

Details
Mass	1.9±0.5 M_{☉}
Radius	107.7 R_{☉}
Luminosity	1,692 L_{☉}
Surface gravity (log g)	0.82±0.09 cgs
Temperature	3,643 K
Metallicity [Fe/H]	−0.03±0.03 dex
Rotational velocity (v sin i)	8.4 km/s

Other designations
- Tejat, Mu Gem, μ Gem, 13 Geminorum, BD+22°1304, FK5 241, HD 44478, HIP 30343, HR 2286, SAO 78297, ADS 4990A, CCDM J06230+2230A, WDS J06230+2231A

Database references
SIMBAD	data

Mu Geminorum or μ Geminorum, formally named Tejat (/ˈtiːdʒət/), is a single star in the northern constellation of Gemini. From parallax measurements obtained during the Hipparcos mission, it is roughly 230 light-years (71 parsecs) distant from the Sun. The position of the star near the ecliptic means that it is subject to lunar occultations.

Mu Geminorum, together with UCAC2 39641417 nearly two arc-minutes away, form a double star designated WDS J06230+2231. UCAC2 39641417 is itself a binary pair, with the two stars less than an arc-second apart.

== Nomenclature ==
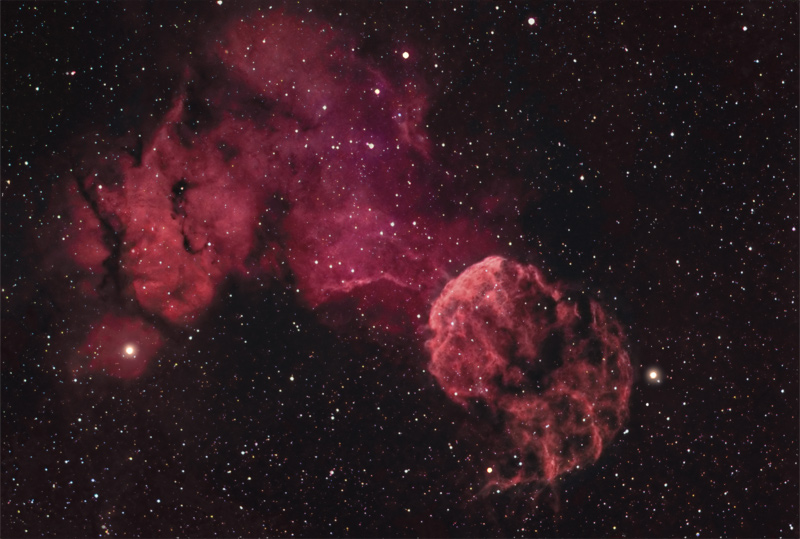
μ Gem is the star on the left, surrounded by the S249 nebula. The bright star on the right, near the IC 443 supernova remnant, is η Gem.

μ Geminorum (Latinised to Mu Geminorum) is the star's Bayer designation. WDS J06230+2231A is the star's designation in the Washington Double Star Catalog. The designations of the double star's components as WDS J06230+2231A and BC derive from the convention used by the Washington Multiplicity Catalog (WMC) for multiple star systems, and adopted by the International Astronomical Union (IAU). The BC binary is an unrelated background star. Further faint companions D, E, and F are also listed, also all distant background objects.

Mu Geminorum bore the traditional name of Tejat (or more precisely, Tejat Posterior), from an old southern Arabic word of unknown meaning, tiḥyāt. The name Tejat Posterior was formerly applied to an asterism consisting of this star, along with Gamma Geminorum (Alhena), Nu Geminorum, Eta Geminorum (Propus), and Xi Geminorum (Alzirr). In 2016, the International Astronomical Union organized a Working Group on Star Names (WGSN) to catalogue and standardize proper names for stars. The WGSN decided to attribute proper names to individual stars rather than entire multiple systems. It approved the name Tejat for Mu Geminorum on February 1, 2017 and it is now so included in the List of IAU-approved Star Names.

The names Calx (Latin, meaning 'heel'), Pish Pai (from the Persian پیش‌پای ('pīshpāy', meaning 'foreleg'), and Nuhatai (from Arabic 'Al Nuḥātai', the dual form of 'Al Nuḥāt', 'a Camel's Hump') have also been applied to Mu Geminorum.

In Chinese, 井宿 (Jǐng Su), meaning Well (asterism), refers to an asterism consisting of Mu Geminorum, Gamma Geminorum, Nu Geminorum, Xi Geminorum, Epsilon Geminorum, 36 Geminorum, Zeta Geminorum and Lambda Geminorum. Consequently, Mu Geminorum itself is known as 井宿一 (Jǐng Su yī, English: the First Star of Well).

== Properties ==
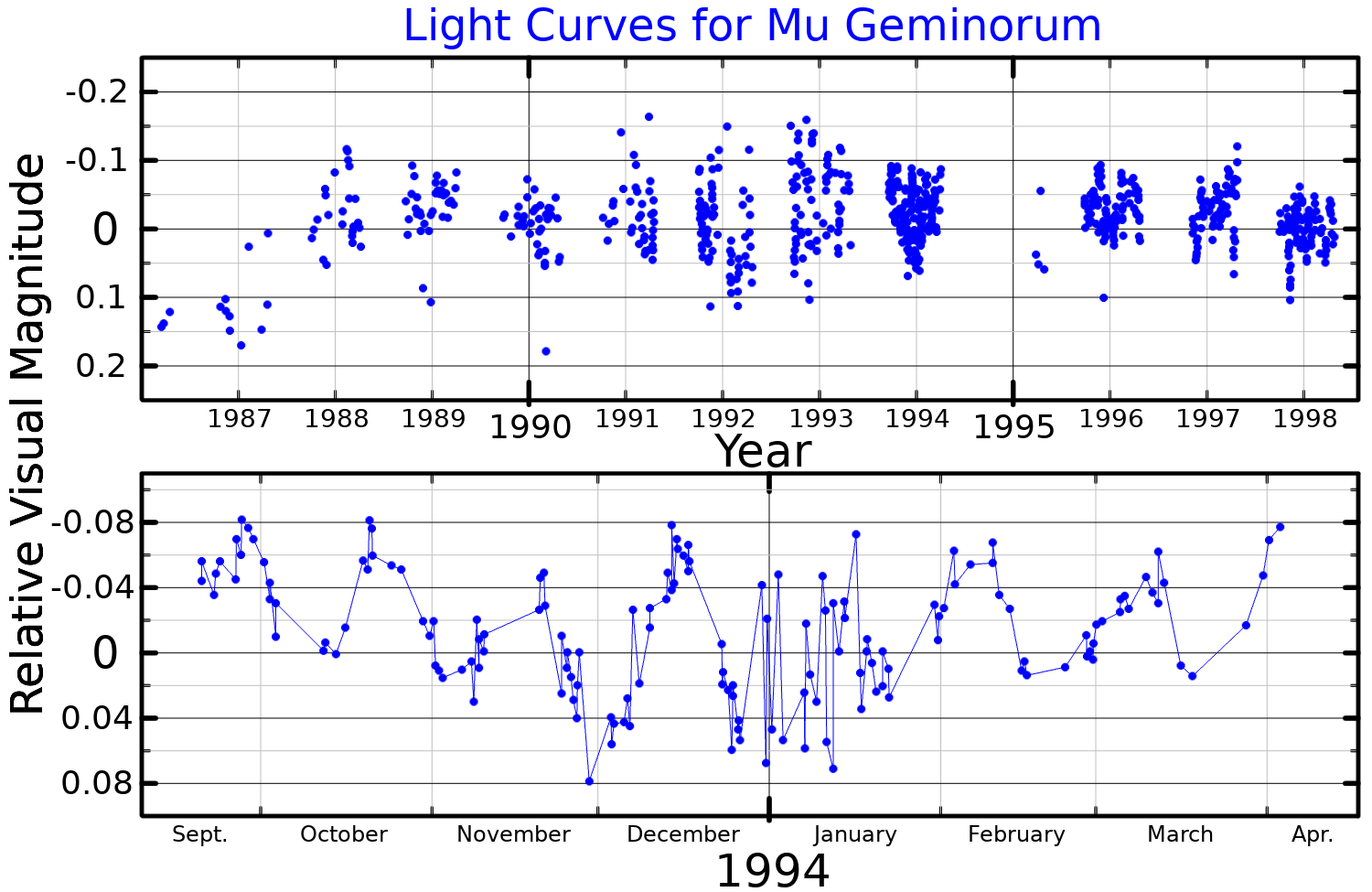
Visual band light curves for Mu Geminorum, adapted from Percy et al. (2001). The 27 day periodicity is visible in the lower plot.

Mu Geminorum has an average apparent visual magnitude of about 2.9, which makes it the fourth-brightest member of Gemini. It is 0.8 degrees south of the ecliptic, so it is subject to occultations by the Moon and, rarely, by planets. Seen from Earth, its brightness is reduced by 0.07 magnitudes by extinction from intervening gas and dust.

It is a slow irregular variable of type LB. Its brightness varies between magnitude +2.75 and +3.02 over a 72-day period, along with a 2,000-day period of long term variation. It is a red giant at a stellar classification of M3 III, with a surface temperature of 3,773 K, meaning it is considerably cooler than the Sun. Despite being cooler than the Sun, it is over 1,500 times as luminous as it has expanded to more than 100 times the size of the Sun.

Mu Geminorum is currently on the asymptotic giant branch and is generating energy through the nuclear fusion of hydrogen and helium along concentric shells surrounding an inert core of carbon and oxygen.
