= Gamma Geminorum =

Star in the constellation Gemini

γ Geminorum
- Location of γ Geminorum (circled)

Observation data Epoch J2000 Equinox ICRS
- Constellation: Gemini
- Right ascension: 06^{h} 37^{m} 42.71050^{s}
- Declination: +16° 23′ 57.4095″
- Apparent magnitude (V): 1.915

Characteristics
- Evolutionary stage: subgiant
- Spectral type: A1IV + G
- U−B color index: +0.137
- B−V color index: +0.005

Astrometry
Radial velocity (R_{v})	−12.5 km/s
Proper motion (μ)	RA: +13.81 mas/yr Dec.: −54.96 mas/yr
Parallax (π)	29.84±2.23 mas
Distance	109 ± 8 ly (34 ± 3 pc)
Absolute magnitude (M_{V})	−0.68

Orbit
Period (P)	4,614.51 days
Semi-major axis (a)	0.2732″
Eccentricity (e)	0.8933±0.0013
Periastron epoch (T)	244399.13±0.77
Argument of periastron (ω) (secondary)	312.60±0.60°
Semi-amplitude (K_{1}) (primary)	11.881±0.068 km/s

Details

γ Gem A
Mass	3.4±0.8 M_{☉}
Radius	6.06+0.43 −0.49 R_{☉}
Luminosity	207.3+37.2 −31.5 L_{☉}
Surface gravity (log g)	3.56±0.08 cgs
Temperature	9,190±130 K
Metallicity [Fe/H]	−0.12 dex
Rotation	8.975±0.05 d
Rotational velocity (v sin i)	10.7±0.2 km/s

γ Gem B
Mass	1.4±0.3 M_{☉}

Other designations
- Alhena, 24 Geminorum, BD+16°1223, FK5 251, GCTP1539.00, HIP 31681, HD 47105, HR 2421, SAO 95912

Database references
SIMBAD	data

Gamma Geminorum (γ Geminorum, abbreviated Gamma Gem, γ Gem), formally named Alhena /ælˈhiːnə/, is the third-brightest object in the constellation of Gemini. It has an apparent visual magnitude of 1.9, making it easily visible to the naked eye even in urban regions. Based upon parallax measurements with the Hipparcos satellite, it is located at a distance of roughly 109 light-years (33 parsecs).

== Properties ==
Alhena is an evolving star that is exhausting the supply of hydrogen at its core and has entered the subgiant stage. The spectrum matches a stellar classification of A0 IV. Compared to the Sun it has 3.4 times the mass and six times the radius. It is radiating around 200 times the luminosity of the Sun from its outer envelope at an effective temperature of 9,190 K. This gives it a white hue typical of an A-class star.

Alhena is a spectroscopic binary system with a period of 12.6 years (4,614.51 days) in a highly eccentric Keplerian orbit. The secondary, with 1.4 times the mass of the Sun, is likely a G-type main-sequence star.

== Etymology ==
γ Geminorum (Latinised to Gamma Geminorum) is the star's Bayer designation. The traditional name Alhena is derived from the Arabic الهنعة Al Han'ah, 'the brand' (on the neck of the camel), whilst the alternate name Almeisan is from the Arabic المیسان Al Maisan, 'the shining one.' Al Hanʽah was the name of star association consisting of this star, along with Mu Geminorum (Tejat Posterior), Nu Geminorum, Eta Geminorum (Tejat Prior) and Xi Geminorum (Alzirr). They also were associated in Al Nuḥātai, the dual form of Al Nuḥāt, 'a Camel's Hump'. In 2016, the International Astronomical Union organized a Working Group on Star Names (WGSN) to catalog and standardize proper names for stars. The WGSN's first bulletin of July 2016 included a table of the first two batches of names approved by the WGSN; which included Alhena for this star.

In the catalogue of stars in the Calendarium of Al Achsasi Al Mouakket, this star was designated Nir al Henat, which was translated into Latin as Prima του al Henat, meaning 'the brightest of Al Henat'.

In Chinese, 井宿 (Jǐng Su), meaning Well (asterism), refers to an asterism consisting of γ Geminorum, ε Geminorum, ζ Geminorum, λ Geminorum, μ Geminorum, ν Geminorum, ξ Geminorum and 36 Geminorum. Consequently, γ Geminorum itself is known as 井宿三 (Jǐng Su sān, English: the Third Star of Well.)

== Conjunctions ==
Gamma Geminorum is 6° south of the ecliptic, far enough so that the Moon never occults it. Similarly, planets in conjunction with this star almost always pass several degrees to the north, but Venus will have a series of close conjunctions with Gamma Geminorum starting in August 2143, and continuing every eight years after over the remainder of that century.

The Sun passes Gamma Geminorum on or around June 30 every year.

== In culture ==
Alhena was the name of a Dutch ship that rescued many people from an Italian cruise liner, the SS Principessa Mafalda, in October 1927. In addition, the American attack cargo ship USS Alhena (AKA-9) was named after the star.
