= Sigma Puppis =

Star in the constellation Puppis

- Location of σ Puppis (circled)

Observation data Epoch J2000 Equinox ICRS
- Constellation: Puppis
- Right ascension: 07^{h} 29^{m} 13.83263^{s}
- Declination: −43° 18′ 05.1674″
- Apparent magnitude (V): 3.25

Characteristics
- Spectral type: K5 III
- U−B color index: +1.77
- B−V color index: +1.52

Astrometry
Radial velocity (R_{v})	+87.3 km/s
Proper motion (μ)	RA: +199.39 mas/yr Dec.: −61.828 mas/yr
Parallax (π)	17.0234±0.5614 mas
Distance	192 ± 6 ly (59 ± 2 pc)
Absolute magnitude (M_{V})	−0.50

Orbit
Period (P)	257.8 days
Eccentricity (e)	0.17
Periastron epoch (T)	20418.6
Argument of periastron (ω) (secondary)	349.3°
Semi-amplitude (K_{1}) (primary)	18.6 km/s

Details

σ Pup A
Mass	1.65 M_{☉}
Radius	43.7 R_{☉}
Luminosity	344 L_{☉}
Surface gravity (log g)	1.51 cgs
Temperature	4,077±4 K
Rotational velocity (v sin i)	3.0 km/s

Other designations
- σ Pup, Sigma Pup, CD−43 3260, CPD−43 1499, FK5 1194, GC 10040, HD 59717, HIP 36377, HR 2878, SAO 218755, WDS J07292-4318A

Database references
SIMBAD	data

Sigma Puppis, Latinized from σ Puppis, is a binary star system in the southern constellation Puppis. It has an apparent visual magnitude of 3.25, which is bright enough to be visible to the naked eye at night from the Southern Hemisphere. Through a telescope, it appears as a bright, orange-hued star with a nearby white companion. Parallax measurements indicate this star is located at a distance of about 192 light-years (59 parsecs) from Earth.

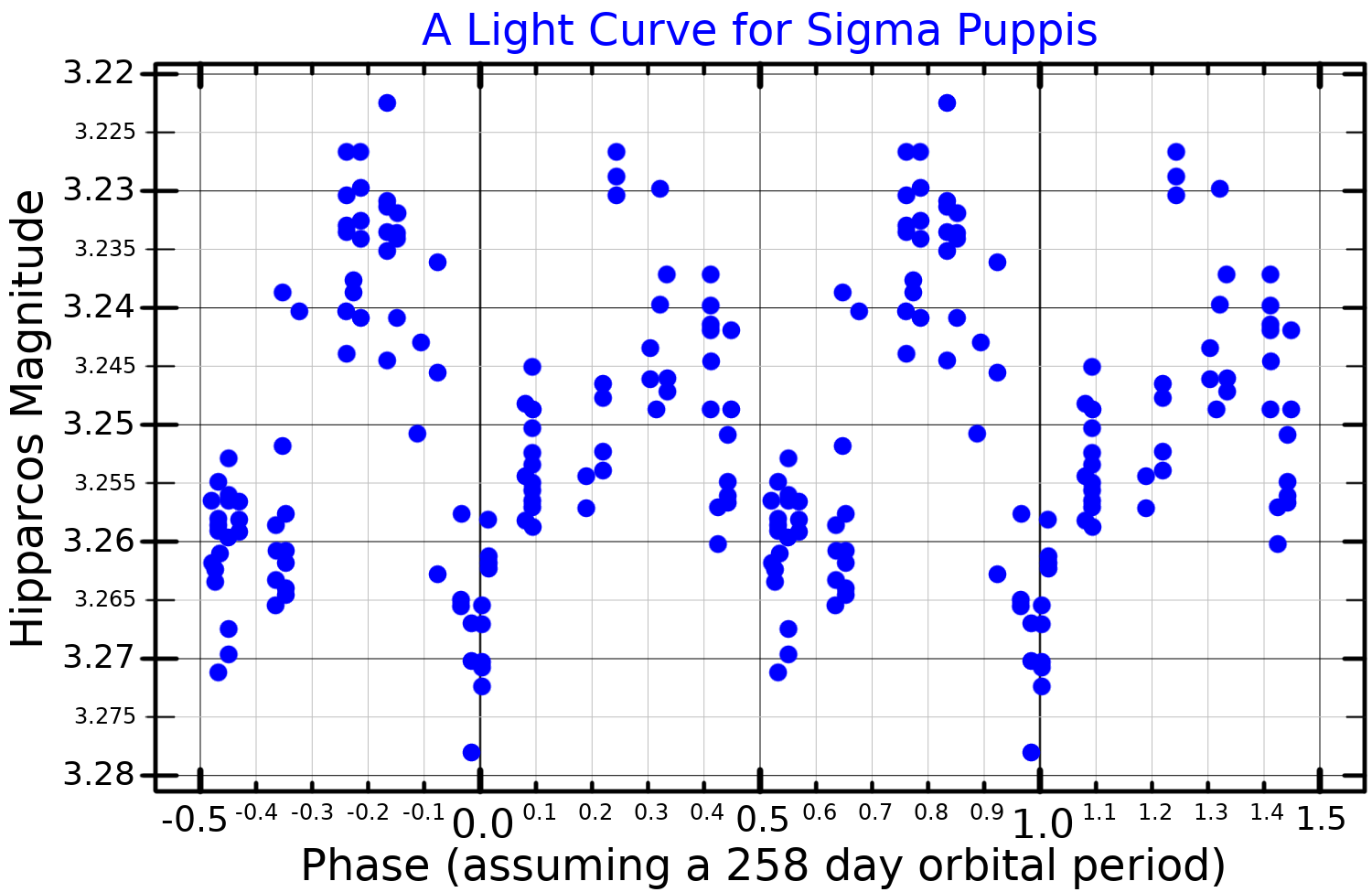
A light curve for Sigma Puppis, adapted from Otero (2007)

This is a spectroscopic binary system, consisting of an orbiting pair of stars that have not been individually resolved with a telescope. Their orbital period is 257.8 days and the eccentricity is 0.17. The pair form an eclipsing binary of the Beta Lyrae type and a period of 130.5 days, or one half of their orbital period. The eclipse of the primary component causes a decline of 0.04 of a magnitude, while the secondary eclipse reduces the magnitude by 0.03.

The combined stellar classification is K5 III, which matches the spectrum of a giant star. The primary is 44 times larger than the Sun and 340 times more luminous. Its surface has an effective temperature of 4,077 K, giving it the orange hue of a K-type star. It shows the behavior of a slow irregular variable.

In addition to its binary components, Sigma Puppis has a more distant companion that has a matching proper motion, suggesting that it may be gravitationally bound to the binary. This magnitude 8.5 star is at an angular separation of 22.4 arcseconds with a position angle of 74° from Sigma Puppis, which is equivalent to a projected separation of 1,200 AU. In 1970, American astronomer Olin J. Eggen suggested that Sigma Puppis belonged to a moving group of stars that share a similar motion through space, and thereby a common origin. It served as the eponym for this, the σ Puppis group. The existence of this group was later brought into question.
