= Alpha Aquarii =

Star in the constellation Aquarius

- Location of α Aquarii (circled)

Observation data Epoch J2000 Equinox ICRS
- Constellation: Aquarius
- Right ascension: 22^{h} 05^{m} 47.03555^{s}
- Declination: −00° 19′ 11.4634″
- Apparent magnitude (V): 2.942

Characteristics
- Evolutionary stage: Yellow supergiant
- Spectral type: G2 Ib
- U−B color index: +0.699
- B−V color index: +0.971
- R−I color index: +0.49

Astrometry
Radial velocity (R_{v})	7.5 km/s
Proper motion (μ)	RA: +18.59 mas/yr Dec.: −10.45 mas/yr
Parallax (π)	4.9451±0.4296 mas
Distance	691.1+37.8 −56.1 ly (211.9+11.6 −17.2 pc)
Absolute magnitude (M_{V})	−3.882

Details
Mass	6.31 M_{☉}
Radius	70 R_{☉}
Luminosity	3,917 L_{☉}
Surface gravity (log g)	1.4 cgs
Temperature	5,190±50 K
Metallicity [Fe/H]	+0.17 dex
Rotational velocity (v sin i)	6.7±1.5 km/s
Age	53 Myr

Other designations
- El Melik, Rucbah, Saad el Melik, Sadalmelek, Sadalmelik, Sadlamulk, α Aqr, Alpha Aquarii, Alpha Aqr, 34 Aquarii, 34 Aqr, BD−01 4246, FK5 827, HD 209750, HIP 109074, HR 8414, SAO 145862

Database references
SIMBAD	data

Alpha Aquarii is a yellow supergiant star in the constellation of Aquarius. Its identifier is a Bayer designation that is Latinized from α Aquarii, and is abbreviated Alf Aqr or α Aqr, respectively. This star has the official name Sadalmelik, pronounced /ˌsædəlˈmɛlɪk/. At an apparent visual magnitude of 2.94, it is the second-brightest star in Aquarius, just marginally fainter than Beta Aquarii. Based upon parallax measurements made by the Gaia spacecraft, it is located at a distance of roughly 690 light-years (210 parsecs). It is drifting further away from the Sun with a radial velocity of 7.5 km/s.

== Nomenclature ==
α Aquarii (Latinised to Alpha Aquarii) is the star's Bayer designation. WDS J22058-0019 A is its designation in the Washington Double Star Catalog.

It bore the traditional name Sadalmelik, which derived from an Arabic expression سعد الملك (sa‘d al-malik), meaning "the lucky [star] of the king". The name Rucbah had also been applied to this star; though it shared that name with Delta Cassiopeiae. It is only one of two stars with ancient proper names to lie within a degree of the celestial equator. The origin of the Arabic name is lost to history. In 2016, the International Astronomical Union organized a Working Group on Star Names (WGSN) to catalogue and standardize proper names for stars. The WGSN approved the name Sadalmelik for Alpha Aquarii (WDS J22058-0019 A) on 21 August 2016, and it is now so included in the List of IAU-approved Star Names (Delta Cassiopeiae was given the name Ruchbah).

In Chinese, 危宿 (Wēi Xiù), meaning Rooftop (asterism), refers to an asterism consisting of Alpha Aquarii, Theta Pegasi and Epsilon Pegasi. Consequently, the Chinese name for Alpha Aquarii itself is 危宿一 (Wēi Xiù yī, English: the First Star of Rooftop).

== Properties ==
With an age of 53 million years, Alpha Aquarii has evolved into a supergiant with a stellar classification of G2 Ib. It lies within the Cepheid instability strip of the Hertzsprung–Russell diagram, near the red (cooler) edge, but is not classified as a variable star. However, variable cores have been detected in the hydrogen lines, which are originating in a circumstellar envelope. The star has a massive stellar wind that reaches supersonic velocity in the chromosphere.

There is some uncertainty about Alpha Aquarii's distance. The original Hipparcos catalog gave a parallax of 4.3±0.83 mas, which translates to a distance of 233±45 parsecs, or 760 light-years. However, the 2007 Hipparcos reduction give a parallax that implies a distance of 161±5 pc, or 520 light-years. The third Gaia data release (Gaia DR3) give a parallax of 4.94±0.43 mas, translating to a distance of 202±17 pc, or 660 light-years.

Alpha Aquarii's angular diameter has been measured at 3.066±0.036 mas. This diameter, at its estimated distance, translates to a radius of 70 times the radius of the Sun. With insufficient mass to explode as a supernova, it will most likely become a massive white dwarf similar to Sirius B. It is radiating 3,900 times as much luminosity as the Sun from its outer atmosphere at an effective temperature of 5,190 K. At this heat, the star glows with the yellow hue of a G-type star. Examination of this star with the Chandra X-ray Observatory shows it to be significantly X-ray deficient compared to G-type main-sequence stars. This deficit is a common feature of early G-type giant stars.

Alpha Aquarii has a visual companion, UCAC2 31789179, of magnitude 12.2. It is at an angular separation of 110.4 arcseconds from Alpha Aquarii along a position angle of 40°. However, the pair is only a visual double, with UCAC2 31789179 being a background star.
