= Omicron Tauri =

Star in the constellation Taurus

- Location of ο Tauri (circled)

Observation data Epoch J2000.0 Equinox ICRS
- Constellation: Taurus
- Right ascension: 03^{h} 24^{m} 48.79832^{s}
- Declination: +09° 01′ 43.9306″
- Apparent magnitude (V): 3.61

Characteristics
- Spectral type: G6 III
- B−V color index: +0.887±0.019

Astrometry
Radial velocity (R_{v})	−19.79±0.06 km/s
Proper motion (μ)	RA: −67.04 mas/yr Dec.: −78.04 mas/yr
Parallax (π)	12.11±0.87 mas
Distance	270 ± 20 ly (83 ± 6 pc)
Absolute magnitude (M_{V})	−1.23

Orbit
Period (P)	1,653.49±0.41 days
Semi-major axis (a)	4.037±0.021 au
Eccentricity (e)	0.2966±0.0014
Periastron epoch (T)	51,288.6±1.2
Argument of periastron (ω) (secondary)	145.18±0.08°
Semi-amplitude (K_{1}) (primary)	4.4172±0.0071 km/s

Details

ο Tauri A
Mass	3.21±0.12 M_{☉}
Radius	20.28±3.66 R_{☉}
Luminosity	302 L_{☉}
Surface gravity (log g)	2.43±0.06 cgs
Temperature	5,094±15 K
Metallicity [Fe/H]	−0.13±0.02 dex
Rotational velocity (v sin i)	3.29±0.61 km/s
Age	324+39 −35 Myr

ο Tauri B
Mass	≥0.568±0.015 M_{☉}

Other designations
- ο Tau, 1 Tauri, BD+08°511, FK5 121, HD 21120, HIP 15900, HR 1030, SAO 111172

Database references
SIMBAD	data

ο Tauri, Latinized as Omicron Tauri, is a binary star system in the constellation Taurus, near the constellation border with Cetus. It has a yellow hue and is visible to the naked eye with an apparent visual magnitude of 3.61. It is approximately 270 light years from the Sun based on parallax, but is drifting closer with a radial velocity of −20 km/s. As the westernmost bright point of light in Taurus, this system has the Flamsteed designation 1 Tauri; Omicron Tauri is the Bayer designation.

This is a single-lined spectroscopic binary system with the two components orbiting each other over a period of 4.5270 years with an eccentricity of 0.2966. The primary component, ο Tau A, is an aging G-type giant with a stellar classification of G6 III. This star has three times the mass of the Sun and 18 to 20 times the Sun's radius. Based on the former, interferometry-measured radius, it is rotating once every 533 days. It is radiating 302 times the luminosity of the Sun from its photosphere at an effective temperature of 5,094 K. The secondary component, ο Tau B, has a minimum mass of 0.568 solar masses.
