= Phi Velorum =

Star in the constellation Vela

φ Velorum
- Location of φ Velorum (circled)

Observation data Epoch J2000 Equinox ICRS
- Constellation: Vela
- Right ascension: 09^{h} 56^{m} 51.742^{s}
- Declination: −54° 34′ 04.04″
- Apparent magnitude (V): 3.53

Characteristics
- Spectral type: B5 Ib
- U−B color index: −0.62
- B−V color index: −0.08

Astrometry
Radial velocity (R_{v})	13.9 km/s
Proper motion (μ)	RA: −13.08 ± 0.10 mas/yr Dec.: 3.55 ± 0.10 mas/yr
Parallax (π)	2.05±0.11 mas
Distance	1,590 ± 90 ly (490 ± 30 pc)
Absolute magnitude (M_{V})	−5.4

Details
Mass	10.1 M_{☉}
Radius	31 R_{☉}
Luminosity	28,200 L_{☉}
Surface gravity (log g)	2.55 cgs
Temperature	14,600 K
Rotational velocity (v sin i)	17 km/s
Age	22.6 Myr

Other designations
- Tseen Ke, HR 3940, HD 86440, SAO 237522, CD−53°3251, FK5 375, GC 13711, HIP 48774, 2MASS J09565173-5434041, IRAS 09550-5419, WDS J09569-5434, CCDM 09569-5434

Database references
SIMBAD	data

Phi Velorum (φ Vel, φ Velorum) is a star in the constellation Vela. It is a blue-white B-type supergiant with an apparent magnitude of +3.53. It is approximately 1,590 light years from Earth.

== Nomenclature ==
φ Velorum (Latinised to Phi Velorum, abbreviated to φ Vel) is the Bayer designation for this star. It is also listed as HR 3940 in the Bright Star Catalogue and HD 86440 in the Henry Draper Catalogue. It has the traditional name Tseen Ke, from Chinese 天紀 (Mandarin tiānjì) "star chart". (lit. "Record of Heaven").

== Properties ==
φ Velorum has a temperature of 14,600 K. Combined with a radius of 31 R_{☉}, it has a luminosity of 28,200 L_{☉}. It has exhausted its core hydrogen and left the main sequence to become a supergiant. It has a current mass of about 10 M_{☉}.

== Companion ==
φ Velorum has an optical companion 39" away. It is a 12th magnitude K0 giant star.
