= Mu Velorum =

Binary star in the constellation Vela

μ Velorum
- Location of μ Velorum (circled)

Observation data Epoch J2000 Equinox J2000
- Constellation: Vela
- Right ascension: 10^{h} 46^{m} 46.17877^{s}
- Declination: −49° 25′ 12.9244″
- Apparent magnitude (V): 2.69 (2.7 + 6.4)

Characteristics

A
- Evolutionary stage: Giant star
- Spectral type: G5III
- U−B color index: +0.57
- B−V color index: +0.90

B
- Spectral type: F4/5V

Astrometry
Radial velocity (R_{v})	+6.2 km/s
Proper motion (μ)	RA: +63.22 mas/yr Dec.: −54.21 mas/yr
Parallax (π)	27.84±0.38 mas
Distance	117 ± 2 ly (35.9 ± 0.5 pc)
Absolute magnitude (M_{V})	−0.06

Orbit
Period (P)	138±5 yr
Semi-major axis (a)	1.40″±0.17″ (50.3 AU (Note: Calculated from angular semi-major axis of 1.40″±0.17″ and distance of 35.9 parsecs.))
Eccentricity (e)	0.938±0.016
Inclination (i)	42±10°
Longitude of the node (Ω)	101±16°
Periastron epoch (T)	1948.4±1.4
Argument of periastron (ω) (secondary)	127±18°

Details

μ Vel A
Mass	3.30 M_{☉}
Radius	13 R_{☉}
Luminosity	107 L_{☉}
Surface gravity (log g)	2.75 cgs
Temperature	5,047 K
Rotational velocity (v sin i)	6.4 km/s
Age	360 Myr

μ Vel B
Mass	~1.5 M_{☉}

Other designations
- CD−48°5913, HD 93497, HIP 52727, HR 4216, SAO 222321

Database references
SIMBAD	data

Mu Velorum (μ Vel, μ Velorum) is a binary star system in the southern constellation Vela. The pair have a combined apparent visual magnitude of 2.69, making the system readily visible to the naked eye. From parallax measurements, the distance to this system is measured at 117 light-years (36 parsecs).

== Characteristics ==
The two stars orbit each other with a period of 138 years and a very high eccentricity of 0.94. Their semi-major axis is of 50 astronomical units, but due to this high eccentricity the separation at periastron is just 3.1 au, while at the apoastron their separation is about 100 au. (Note: From a(1−e) and a(1+e)) The system is about 360 million years old.

The primary component is a giant star with an apparent magnitude of 2.7 and a stellar classification of G5 III. It is radiating about 107 times the luminosity of the Sun from an expanded atmosphere about 13 times the Sun's radius. The mass of this star is 3.3 times that of the Sun. In 1998, the Extreme Ultraviolet Explorer space telescope detected a strong flare that released an X-ray emission nearly equal to the output of the entire star. The quiescent X-ray luminosity of Mu Velorum A is about 1.7 × 10^{30} erg s^{−1}.

The fainter companion, Mu Velorum B, is a main sequence star with an apparent magnitude of 6.4 and an assigned stellar classification of G2V. However, this classification is suspect. Closer examination of the spectrum suggests the star may actually have a classification of F4V or F5V, which suggests a mass of about 1.5 times the mass of the Sun. Such stars typically do not show a marked level of magnetic activity.
