= Epsilon Pegasi =

Star in the northern constellation of Pegasus

ε Pegasi
- Location of ε Pegasi (circled)

Observation data Epoch J2000 Equinox ICRS
- Constellation: Pegasus
- Right ascension: 21^{h} 44^{m} 11.15614^{s}
- Declination: +09° 52′ 30.0311″
- Apparent magnitude (V): 2.37–2.45

Characteristics
- Evolutionary stage: Red supergiant
- Spectral type: K2 Ib–II
- U−B color index: +1.722
- B−V color index: +1.527
- Variable type: LC

Astrometry
Radial velocity (R_{v})	3.39±0.06 km/s
Proper motion (μ)	RA: +26.92 mas/yr Dec.: +0.4 mas/yr
Parallax (π)	4.73±0.17 mas
Distance	690 ± 20 ly (211 ± 8 pc)
Absolute magnitude (M_{V})	−4.142

Details
Mass	11–12 M_{☉}
Radius	183+6 −7 R_{☉}
Luminosity	8,508±596 L_{☉}
Luminosity (visual, L_{V})	3,895 L_{☉}
Surface gravity (log g)	1.01 cgs
Temperature	4,100±37 K
Metallicity [Fe/H]	−0.04 dex
Rotational velocity (v sin i)	8 km/s
Age	20.0±4.5 Myr

Other designations
- Enif, 8 Pegasi, BD+09°4891, FK5 815, HD 206778, HIP 107315, HR 8308, SAO 127029

Database references
SIMBAD	data

Epsilon Pegasi (Latinised from ε Pegasi, abbreviated Epsilon Peg, ε Peg), formally named Enif /ˈiːnɪf/, is the brightest star in the northern constellation of Pegasus.

With an average apparent visual magnitude of 2.4, this is a second-magnitude star that is readily visible to the naked eye. The distance to this star can be estimated using parallax measurements from the Hipparcos astrometry satellite, yielding a value of around 690 light-years (210 parsecs).

== Nomenclature ==
ε Pegasi (Latinised to Epsilon Pegasi) is the star's Bayer designation.

It bore the traditional name Enif derived from the Arabic word for 'nose', due to its position as the muzzle of Pegasus. In 2016, the International Astronomical Union organized a Working Group on Star Names (WGSN) to catalog and standardize proper names for stars. The WGSN's first bulletin of July 2016 included a table of the first two batches of names approved by the WGSN; which included Enif for this star.

Other traditional names for the star include Fom al Feras, Latinised to Os Equi. In Chinese, 危宿 (Wēi Sù), meaning Rooftop (asterism), refers to an asterism consisting of Epsilon Pegasi, Alpha Aquarii and Theta Pegasi. Consequently, the Chinese name for Epsilon Pegasi itself is 危宿三 (Wēi Sù sān, English: the Third Star of Rooftop.)

== Physical characteristics ==
Epsilon Pegasi is a red supergiant star, as indicated by the stellar classification of K2 Ib. It is estimated to be between 11 and 12 times the Sun's mass and has an enormous size of 183 times the radius of the Sun. From this expanded envelope, it is radiating roughly 8,500 times the luminosity of the Sun at an effective temperature of 4,100 K. This temperature is cooler than the Sun, giving it the orange-hued glow of a K-type star.

Epsilon Pegasi is a slow irregular variable star that usually has a brightness between magnitudes 2.37 and 2.45. However, it was once observed very briefly at magnitude 0.7, giving rise to the theory that it (and possibly other supergiants) erupt in massive flares that dwarf those of the Sun. It has also been observed as faint as magnitude 3.5.

The spectrum shows an overabundance of the elements strontium and barium, which may be the result of the s-process of nucleosynthesis in the outer atmosphere of the star. It has a relatively high peculiar velocity of 21.6 km/s.

== Evolution ==
Epsilon Pegasi has exhausted its core hydrogen and expanded away from the main sequence. It is almost certainly on the horizontal branch fusing helium in its core. If it loses more mass in the supergiant phase in its evolution, it may shed its outer layers and leave behind an unusual high mass oxygen–neon white dwarf near the Chandrasekhar limit, otherwise it may be able to produce a supernova, albeit an electron capture supernova.

Based on its position on the color-magnitude diagram, Enif may have evolved from a whitish-yellow color to its current red color in the last 2,000 years, though there is currently no historical record supporting this.

== Pulfrich effect ==
Epsilon Pegasi is a fine example to observe the Pulfrich effect. This optical phenomenon is described on page 1372 of Burnham's Celestial Handbook. According to John Herschel: The apparent pendulum-like oscillation of a small star in the same vertical as the large one, when the telescope is swung from side to side.

== See also ==
- List of nearest bright stars
- Lists of stars
- Historical brightest stars
