= Beta Cancri =

Star in the constellation Cancer

β Cancri
- β Cancri is the bottom right star in the "crab"

Observation data Epoch J2000 Equinox ICRS
- Constellation: Cancer
- Right ascension: 08^{h} 16^{m} 30.92099^{s}
- Declination: +09° 11′ 07.9582″
- Apparent magnitude (V): 3.50 to 3.58

Characteristics
- Spectral type: K4III Ba1
- U−B color index: +1.77
- B−V color index: +1.48
- Variable type: Suspected

Astrometry
Radial velocity (R_{v})	22.94 km/s
Proper motion (μ)	RA: −46.82 mas/yr Dec.: −49.24 mas/yr
Parallax (π)	10.75±0.19 mas
Distance	303 ± 5 ly (93 ± 2 pc)
Absolute magnitude (M_{V})	−1.218

Details
Mass	1.7±0.1 M_{☉}
Radius	51.7±1 R_{☉}
Luminosity	677±41 L_{☉}
Surface gravity (log g)	1.28±0.04 cgs
Temperature	4,094±53 K
Metallicity [Fe/H]	−0.29±0.06 dex
Rotational velocity (v sin i)	3.7±0.8 km/s
Age	1.85±0.34 Gyr

Other designations
- Tarf, β Cancri, 17 Cancri, BD+09°1917, FK5 312, GC 11254, HD 69267, HIP 40526, HR 3249, SAO 116569, ADS 6704, CCDM 08165+0911, WDS J08165+0911A

Database references
SIMBAD	data

Beta Cancri is the brightest star in the zodiacal constellation of Cancer. The star has the proper name Tarf, pronounced /ˈtɑːrf/; Beta Cancri is its Bayer designation. It is visible to the naked eye with an apparent visual magnitude of +3.5, and has an absolute magnitude of −1.2. Based on parallax measurements, it is 303 light-years distant from the Solar System. It is drifting further away with a line of sight velocity of 23 km/s. An exoplanet, designated Beta Cancri b, is believed to be orbiting the star.

Beta Cancri has a visual companion listed and together they are designated WDS J08165+0911. However, it is not certain if the companion is gravitationally bound or not. As the primary, Beta Cancri bears the designation WDS J08165+0911A. The companion is designated WDS J08165+0911B.

== Nomenclature ==
β Cancri (Latinised to Beta Cancri) is the star's Bayer designation. This designation is Latinized from β Cancri and is abbreviated Beta Cnc or β Cnc. WDS J08165+0911A is its designation in the Washington Double Star Catalog.

The star bore the traditional name of Al Tarf (anglicized as Altarf), which can be translated from the Arabic as "end" or "edge". In 2016, the IAU organized a Working Group on Star Names (WGSN) to catalog and standardize proper names for stars. The WGSN approved the name Tarf for Beta Cancri on 1 June 2018 and it is now so included in the List of IAU-approved Star Names.

== Properties ==
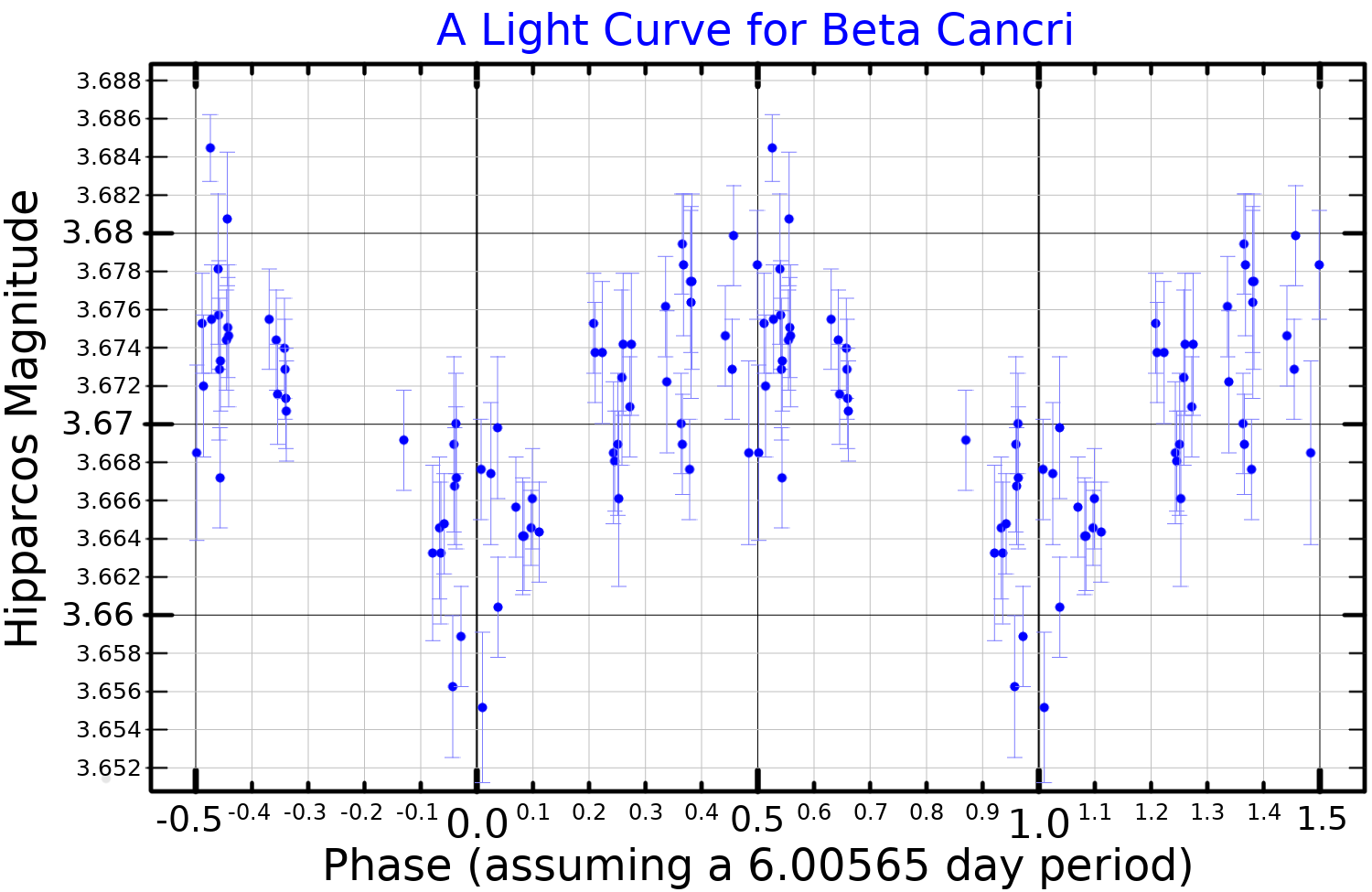
A light curve for Beta Cancri, plotted from Hipparcos data

Beta Cancri is an orange K-type giant with a stellar classification of K4III Ba1. The suffix notation indicates this is a Barium star, a type of cool giant showing enhanced abundances of barium. At an estimated age of 1.9 billion years, it has 1.7 times the mass of the Sun and has expanded to 52 times the Sun's radius. The star is radiating around 677 times the luminosity of the Sun from its photosphere at an effective temperature of 4,094 K.

This star is suspected to vary slightly in brightness. Koen and Laurent analyzed the Hipparcos data for Beta Cancri and found in that data set its brightness varied with an amplitude of 0.0054 magnitudes over a period of 6.00565 days.

The co-moving companion is a red dwarf of the fourteenth magnitude. From its angular separation of 29.5 arcseconds, the companion's distance from Beta Cancri is at least 2,740 AU. If they form a binary system, then the orbital period is at least 76,000 years.

== Planetary system ==
In 2014 evidence was presented of a planet orbiting Beta Cancri. Using radial velocity data from repeated observations of the star, the planet is estimated to have a minimum mass of approximately 7.8 times that of Jupiter, and an orbital period of 605 days.

The Beta Cancri planetary system
Companion (in order from star)	Mass	Semimajor axis (AU)	Orbital period (days)	Eccentricity	Inclination (°)	Radius
b	7.8±0.8 M_{J}	1.7±0.1	605.2±4.0	0.08±0.02	—	—

== See also ==
- Alphard, a similar giant
- Procyon, which lies close to Beta Cancri in the sky
- Gamma^{1} Leonis, another giant with an exoplanet
