= Nu Geminorum =

Star system in the constellation Gemini

ν Geminorum
- Location of ν Geminorum (circled in red)

Observation data Epoch J2000.0 Equinox J2000.0 (ICRS)
- Constellation: Gemini
- Right ascension: 06^{h} 28^{m} 57.78613^{s}
- Declination: +20° 12′ 43.6856″
- Apparent magnitude (V): 4.16

Characteristics
- Spectral type: B6 III + B8 III
- U−B color index: −0.47
- B−V color index: −0.13

Astrometry
Radial velocity (R_{v})	+39.4 km/s
Proper motion (μ)	RA: −6.82 mas/yr Dec.: −13.10 mas/yr
Parallax (π)	5.99±0.28 mas
Distance	540 ± 30 ly (167 ± 8 pc)
Absolute magnitude (M_{V})	−2.2 + −1.2

Orbit
Primary	ν Gem Aa
Name	ν Gem Ab
Period (P)	53.7722 ± 0.0008 d
Semi-major axis (a)	2.82 ± 0.02 mas
Eccentricity (e)	0.056 ± 0.003
Inclination (i)	0.98 ± 0.03°
Longitude of the node (Ω)	78.9 ± 0.2°
Periastron epoch (T)	MJD 51011.8 ± 0.1
Argument of periastron (ω) (secondary)	6.7 ± 2.0°
Semi-amplitude (K_{1}) (primary)	51.6 ± 0.6 km/s
Semi-amplitude (K_{2}) (secondary)	52.5 ± 1.1 km/s

Orbit
Primary	ν Gem A
Name	ν Gem B
Period (P)	6977.3 ± 6.1
Semi-major axis (a)	82.8 ± 1.3 mas
Eccentricity (e)	0.241 ± 0.002
Inclination (i)	75.9 ± 0.2°
Longitude of the node (Ω)	121.0 ± 0.1°
Periastron epoch (T)	MJD 48810.3 ± 13.0
Argument of periastron (ω) (secondary)	226.9 ± 0.4°
Semi-amplitude (K_{1}) (primary)	8.0 ± 0.1 km/s
Semi-amplitude (K_{2}) (secondary)	15.9 ± 0.1 km/s

Details

ν Gem Aa
Mass	3.34 M_{☉}
Luminosity	1,380 L_{☉}
Temperature	14,100 K
Rotational velocity (v sin i)	160 km/s

ν Gem Ab
Mass	3.28 M_{☉}

ν Gem B
Mass	3.33 M_{☉}

Other designations
- ν Gem, 18 Geminorum, BD+20°1441, FK5 1173, HD 45542, HIP 30883, HR 2343, SAO 78423, WDS 06290+2013

Database references
SIMBAD	data

Nu Geminorum, Latinized from ν Geminorum, is a triple star system in the constellation Gemini. It has an apparent visual magnitude of 4.16, which is bright enough to be visible to the naked eye on a dark night. Based upon an annual parallax shift of 5.99 mas, it is located at a distance of roughly 540 light years from the Sun. The position of this system near the ecliptic means it is subject to lunar occultations.

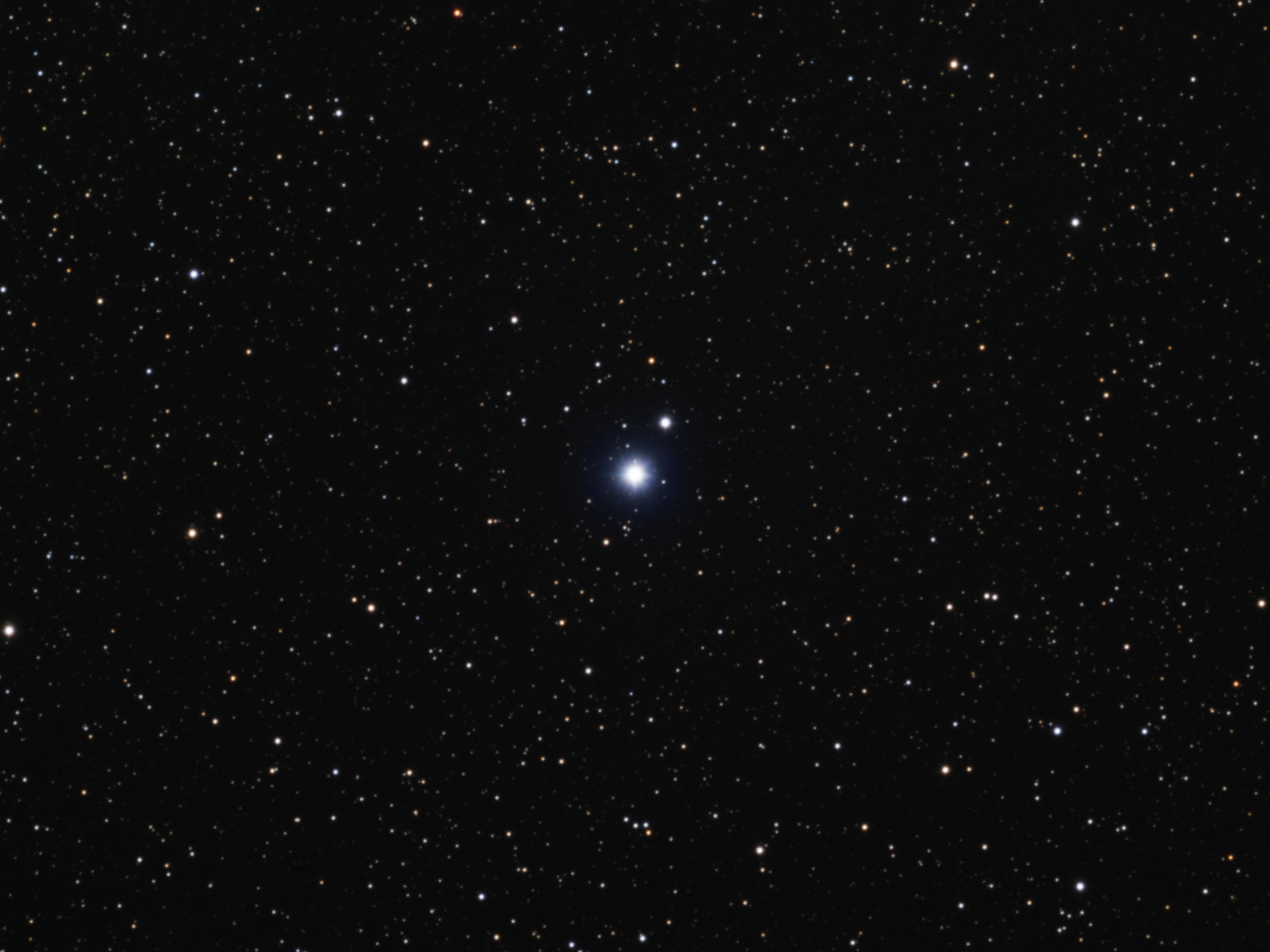
ν Geminorum in optical light

The inner components of this multiple star system have an orbital period of about 54 days and a nearly circular orbit with an eccentricity of 0.056. There is some uncertainty in the spectral type, with classifications ranging from a main sequence star to a giant. Orbiting the inner pair is a classical Be star, with an orbital period of 19.1 years and an eccentricity of 0.24. The two orbits are co-directional and roughly coplanar. The system is overall dynamically stable, and shows no signs of Kozai-Lidov cycles. The outer Be star appears to be single.

ν Gem together with γ Gem (Alhena), η Gem (Propus), μ Gem (Tejat), and ξ Gem (Alzirr) formed the Arabic asterism Al Nuḥātai, the Camel's Hump; ν Gem being the only one of these stars that is otherwise unnamed. Based on this, the catalogue of stars in the Technical Memorandum 33-507 - A Reduced Star Catalog Containing 537 Named Stars listed ν Gem with the name Nucatai.

On 15 August 2028, it will be occulted by Venus over Southern Africa and Madagascar.
