= Lambda Geminorum =

Star in the constellation Gemini

λ Geminorum
- Location of λ Geminorum (circled)

Observation data Epoch J2000.0 Equinox ICRS
- Constellation: Gemini
- Right ascension: 07^{h} 18^{m} 05.58012^{s}
- Declination: +16° 32′ 25.3964″
- Apparent magnitude (V): 3.571

Characteristics
- Evolutionary stage: main sequence
- Spectral type: A3V
- U−B color index: +0.167
- B−V color index: +0.113
- Variable type: Constant

Astrometry
Radial velocity (R_{v})	–7.40 km/s
Proper motion (μ)	RA: –44.43 mas/yr Dec.: –36.61 mas/yr
Parallax (π)	32.33±0.20 mas
Distance	100.9 ± 0.6 ly (30.9 ± 0.2 pc)
Absolute magnitude (M_{V})	+1.13

Details
Mass	2.098 M_{☉}
Radius	2.7773±0.0469 R_{☉}
Luminosity	27.3901±0.3416 L_{☉}
Temperature	7,932±62 K
Metallicity [Fe/H]	−0.04±0.04 dex
Rotational velocity (v sin i)	154 km/s
Age	0.8 Gyr; 0.5 Gyr

Other designations
- λ Gem, 54 Geminorum, NSV 3512, BD+16 1443, FK5 277, HD 56537, HIP 35350, HR 2763, SAO 96746, WDS J07181+1632A

Database references
SIMBAD	data

Lambda Geminorum, Latinized from λ Geminorum, is a candidate multiple star system in the constellation Gemini. It is visible to the naked eye at night with a combined apparent visual magnitude of 3.57. The distance to this system is 101 light years based on parallax, and it is drifting closer with a radial velocity of –7.4 km/s. It is a member of what is suspected to be a trailing tidal tail of the Hyades Stream.

Components A and B of this system form a wide binary. The secondary, component B, is a magnitude 10.7 stellar companion at an angular separation of 9.29″ from the primary along a position angle of 35.72°, as of 2009. The primary was identified as a spectroscopic binary by E. B. Frost in 1924. This companion was confirmed during a lunar occultation with a separation of 14.1±0.7 mas and magnitude 6.8.

The primary, designated component A, typically has been assigned a stellar classification of A3V, which indicates this is an A-type main-sequence star that generates energy from core hydrogen fusion. However, in 1970 D. C. Barry classed it as A4IV, suggesting this may be a subgiant star that has begun evolving into a giant star. It was catalogued a suspected variable star, but is now confirmed as constant.

This star is less than a billion years in age with a rapid spin, showing a projected rotational velocity of 154 km/s It is larger and hotter than the Sun, with twice the Sun's mass and 2.8 times the radius of the Sun. The star is radiating 27 times the Sun's luminosity from its photosphere at an effective temperature of 7,932 K.

The primary displays a significant infrared excess in the K-band, which indicates an orbiting circumstellar disk of dust. A model fit to the data shows an inner radius between 0.08 AU and 0.14 AU, and an outer radius of up to 0.65 AU.
