= NGC 5749 =

Open cluster in the constellation Lupus

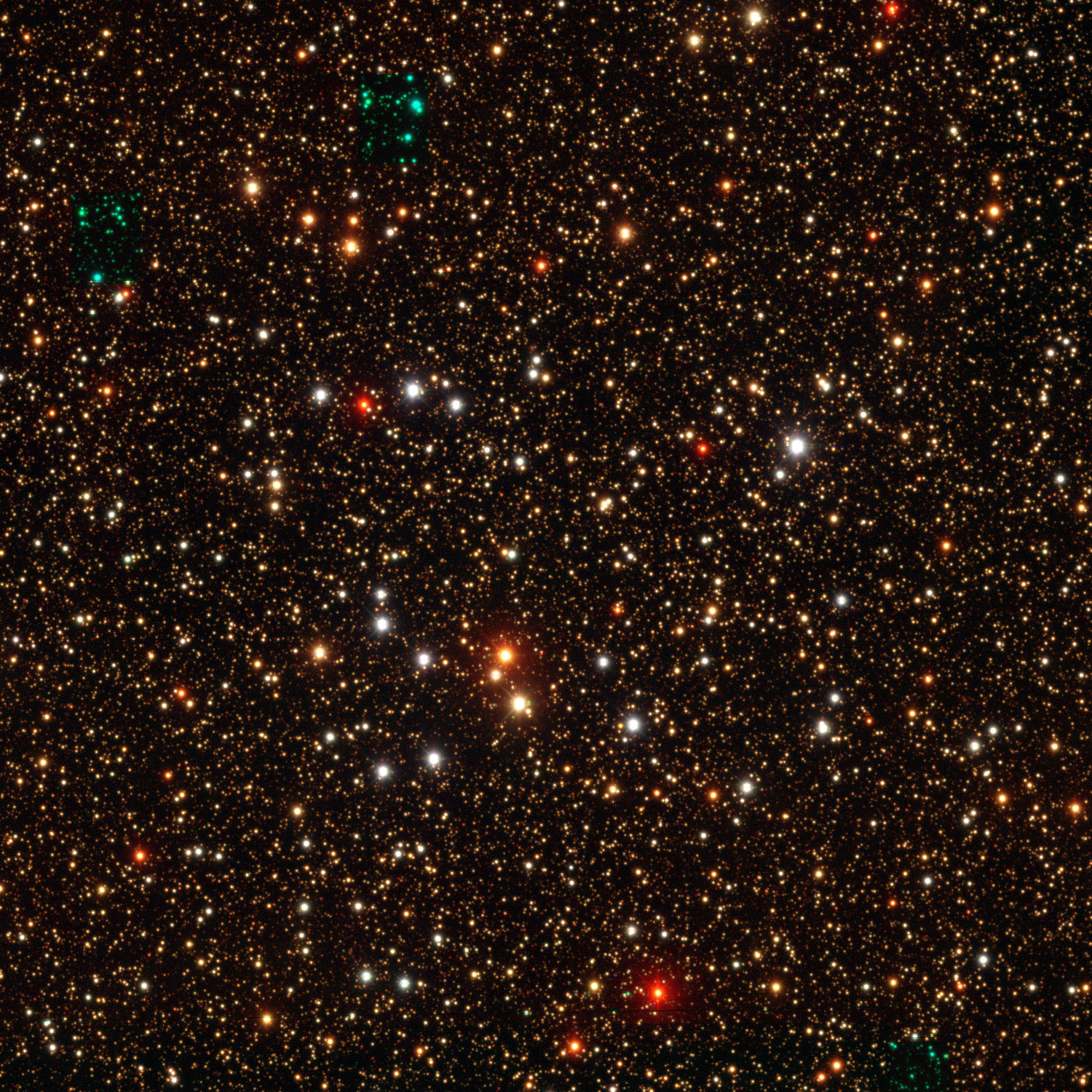
- NGC 5749 with DECaPS

Observation data (J2000 epoch)
- Right ascension: 14^{h} 48^{m} 49.(0)^{s}
- Declination: −54° 30′ 0(7)″
- Distance: 3,548 ly (1,087.9 pc)
- Apparent magnitude (V): 11.23
- Apparent dimensions (V): 16.7′

Physical characteristics
- Mass: 20.8+24.0 −11.2 M_{☉} M_{☉}
- Radius: 11.7 ± 2.9 ly (3.6 ± 0.9 pc) (tidal)
- Estimated age: 27.0 Myr
- Other designations: NGC 5749, Cr 287, ESO 176-SC 004

Associations
- Constellation: Lupus

NGC 5749 is an open cluster of stars positioned near the southwest border of the southern constellation of Lupus. It is located at a distance of 3,548 light years from the Sun. This is a poorly populated cluster that shows a low level of concentration; the Trumpler class is IV1p. There are 112 stars brighter than magnitude 14.4 within an angular radius of ~15′ of the cluster center, but only about 30% of these are members. NGC 5749 is 27 million years old with a tidal radius of 11.7 light years and a mass of ~21 M_{☉}. Polarization measurements suggest there is a dust cloud within the cluster.
