= Gacrux =

Star in the constellation Crux

γ Crucis
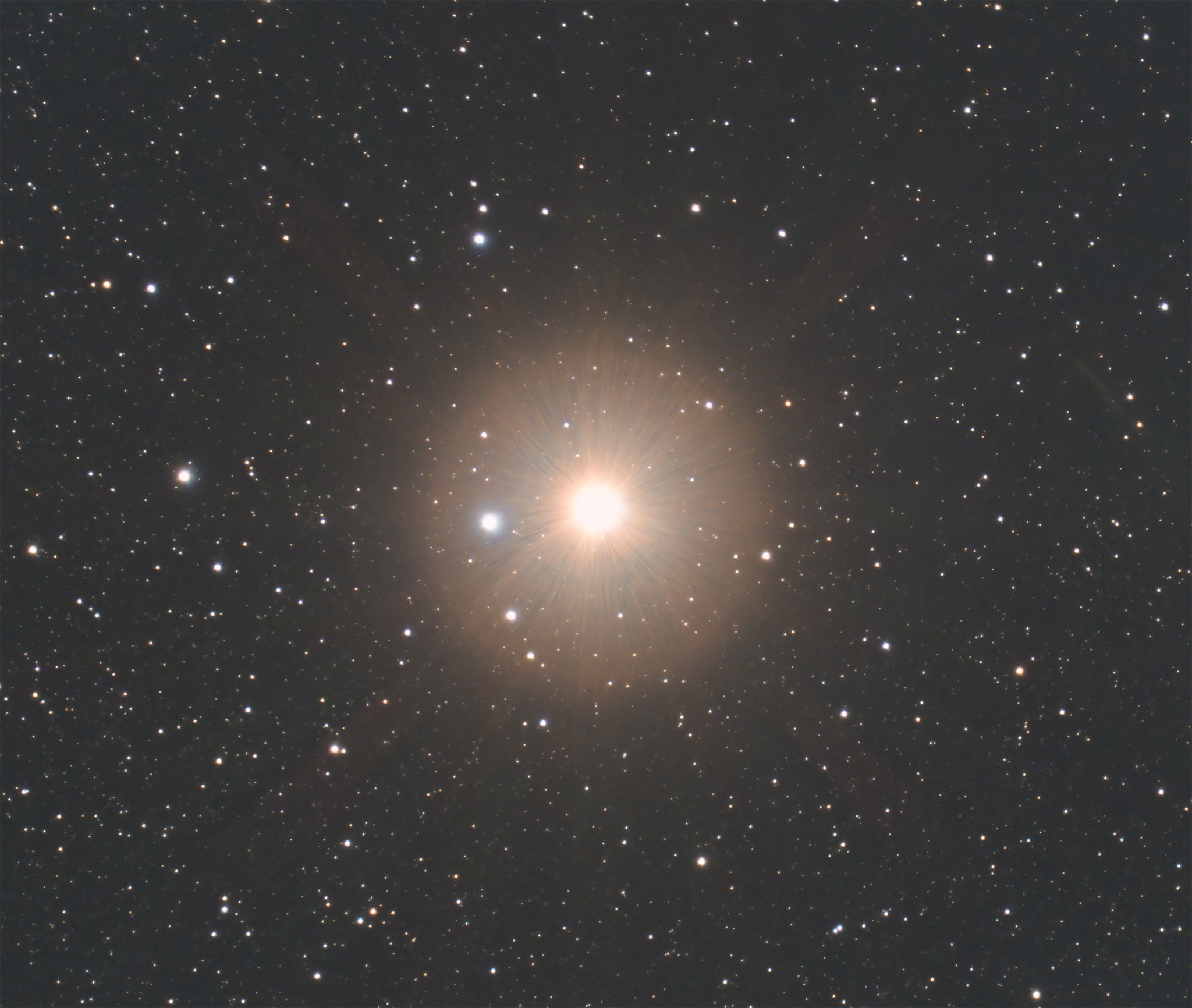
- Gacrux, γ Crucis

Observation data Epoch J2000.0 Equinox J2000.0
- Constellation: Crux
- Right ascension: 12^{h} 31^{m} 09.960^{s}
- Declination: −57° 06′ 47.57″
- Apparent magnitude (V): +1.64

Characteristics
- Evolutionary stage: Red giant branch
- Spectral type: M3.5 III
- Apparent magnitude (J): −1.99
- U−B color index: +1.78
- B−V color index: +1.59
- Variable type: SRV

Astrometry
Radial velocity (R_{v})	+20.6 km/s
Proper motion (μ)	RA: +28.23 mas/yr Dec.: −265.08 mas/yr
Parallax (π)	36.83±0.18 mas
Distance	88.6 ± 0.4 ly (27.2 ± 0.1 pc)
Absolute magnitude (M_{V})	−0.68±0.01

Details
Mass	1.5±0.2 M_{☉}
Radius	73 R_{☉}
Luminosity	830 L_{☉}
Surface gravity (log g)	0.75±0.02 cgs
Temperature	3,689±125 K

Other designations
- Gacrux, γ Crucis, CD−56 4504, GJ 470, HD 108903, HIP 61084, HR 4763, SAO 240019, LTT 4752

Database references
SIMBAD	data

Gacrux is the third-brightest star in the southern constellation of Crux, the Southern Cross. It has the Bayer designation Gamma Crucis, which is Latinised from γ Crucis and abbreviated Gamma Cru or γ Cru. With an apparent visual magnitude of +1.63, it is the 26th brightest star in the night sky. A line from the two "Pointers", Alpha Centauri through Beta Centauri, leads to within 1° north of this star. Using parallax measurements made during the Hipparcos mission, it is 88.6 light-years (27.2 parsecs) distant. It is the nearest M-type red giant star.

== Nomenclature ==
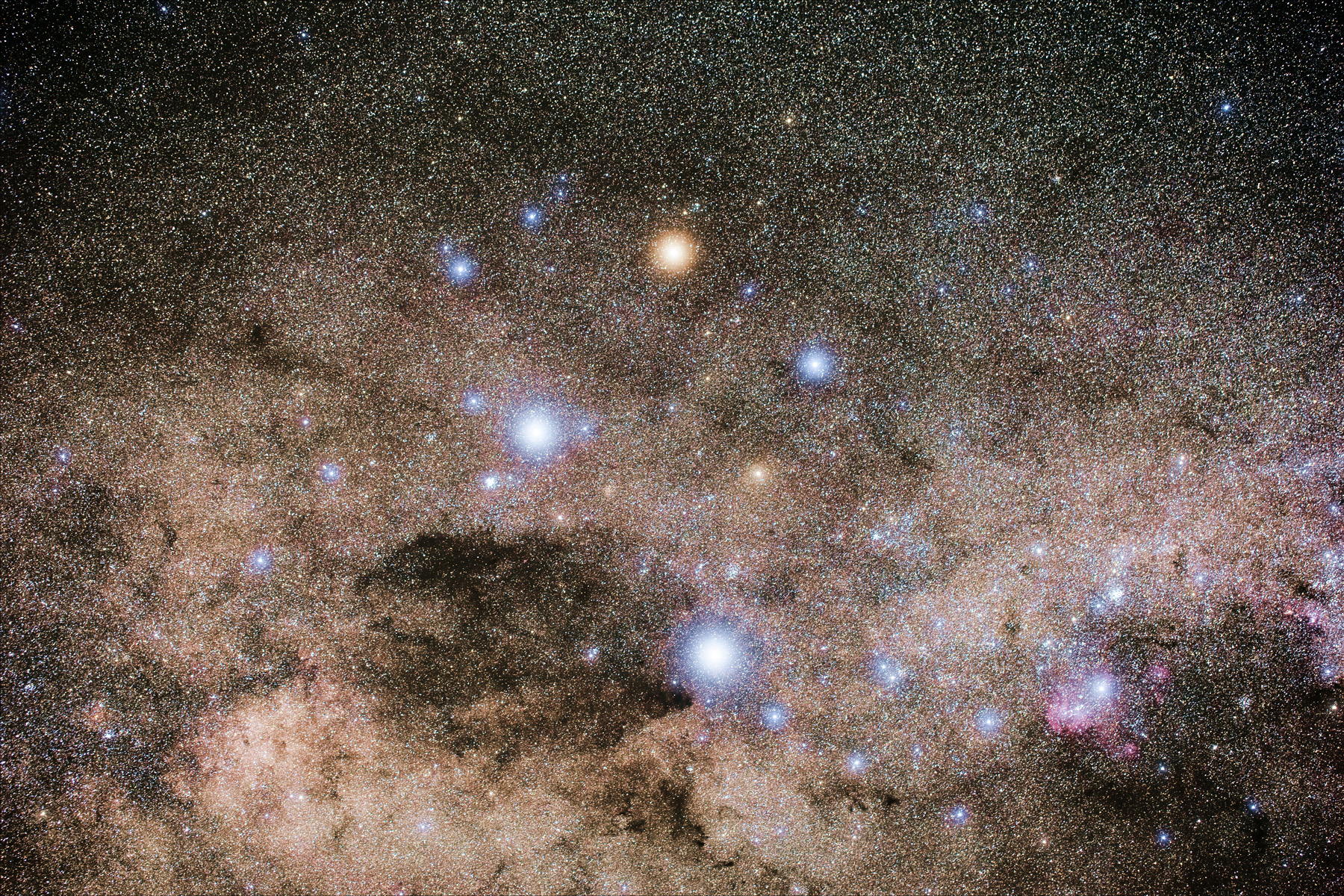
The constellation Crux, with the reddish star Gacrux at the top of the constellation (north) in this image

γ Crucis (Latinised to Gamma Crucis) is the star's Bayer designation. Gacrux is currently at roughly 60° south declination. It was known and visible to the ancient Greeks and Romans as it was visible north of 40° latitude because of the precession of equinoxes. It lacked a Western traditional name. The astronomer Ptolemy counted it as part of the constellation of Centaurus. The name Gacrux was coined by modern navigators as a contraction of the Bayer designation no later than the 1940s. In 2016, the International Astronomical Union organized a Working Group on Star Names (WGSN) to catalog and standardize proper names for stars. The WGSN's first bulletin of July 2016 included a table of the first two batches of names approved by the WGSN, which included Gacrux for this star.

In Chinese astronomy, Gamma Crucis is known as 十字架一 (Shí Zì Jià yī, English: the First Star of Cross).

The people of Aranda and Luritja tribe around Hermannsburg, Central Australia named Iritjinga, "The Eagle-hawk", a quadrangular arrangement comprising Gacrux, Delta Crucis (Imai), Gamma Centauri (Muhlifain) and Delta Centauri (Ma Wei). To the Boorong clan of the Wergaia, Gacrux is known as Bunya.

Among Portuguese-speaking peoples, especially in Brazil, it is also named Rubídea (or Ruby-like), in reference to its colour.

== Physical properties ==
Pulsation Periods
Period (days)	Amplitude (magnitude)
12.1	0.016
15.1	0.027
16.5	0.016
54.8	0.026
82.7	0.015
104.9	0.016

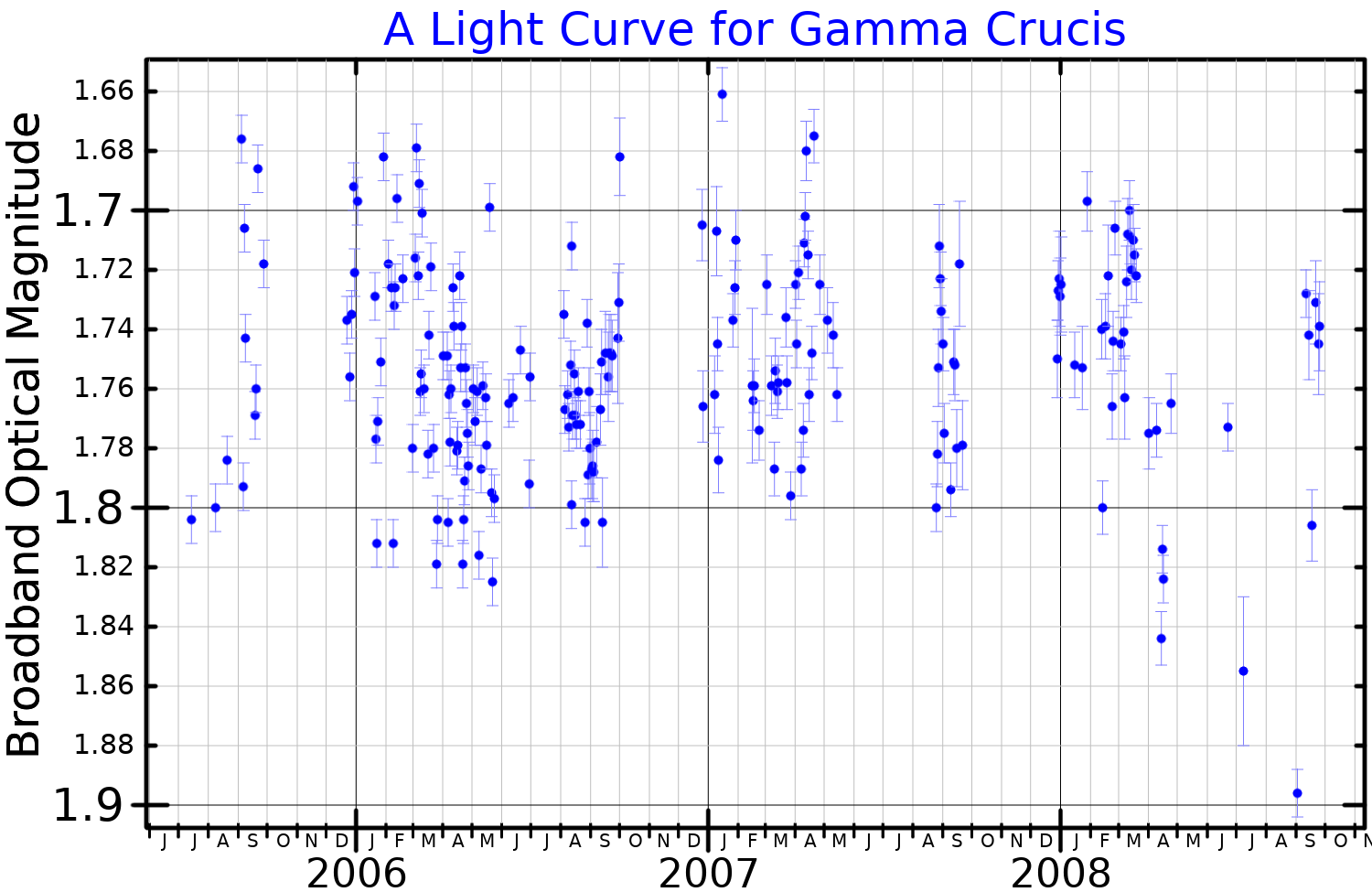
A light curve for Gamma Crucis, plotted from data published by Tabur et al.

Gacrux has the MK system stellar classification of M3.5 III. It has evolved off of the main sequence to become a red giant star, but is most likely on the red giant branch rather than the asymptotic giant branch. Although only 50% more massive than the Sun, at this stage the star has expanded to 73 times the Sun's radius. It is radiating roughly 830 times the luminosity of the Sun from its expanded outer envelope. With an effective temperature of 3,689 K, the colour of Gacrux is a prominent reddish-orange, well in keeping with its spectral classification. It is a semi-regular variable with multiple periods. (See table at left.)

The atmosphere of this star is enriched with barium, which is usually explained by the transfer of material from a more evolved companion. Typically this companion will subsequently become a white dwarf. However, no such companion has yet been detected. A +6.4 magnitude companion star named HD 108925 (A3IVn) lies about 2 arcminutes away at a position angle of 128° from the main star, and can be observed with binoculars. But it is only an optical companion, which is about 400 light years distant from Earth.

== In culture ==
Gacrux is represented in the flags of Australia, New Zealand, Samoa, and Papua New Guinea as one of five stars (four in the case of New Zealand) that compose the Southern Cross.

It is also featured on the flag of Brazil, along with 26 other stars, each of which represents a state. Gacrux represents the State of Bahia. The position of the line passing through Gacrux and Acrux marks the local meridian of the sky observed from Rio de Janeiro, at 8:30 am on 15 November 1889, the time when the republic was formally ratified.

== See also ==
- Aldebaran – a prominent red giant
- Betelgeuse – a prominent red giant
- Mimosa (star) – Star in the constellation Crux
