= RV Moana Wave =

Gyre-class oceanographic research ship of the United States Navy

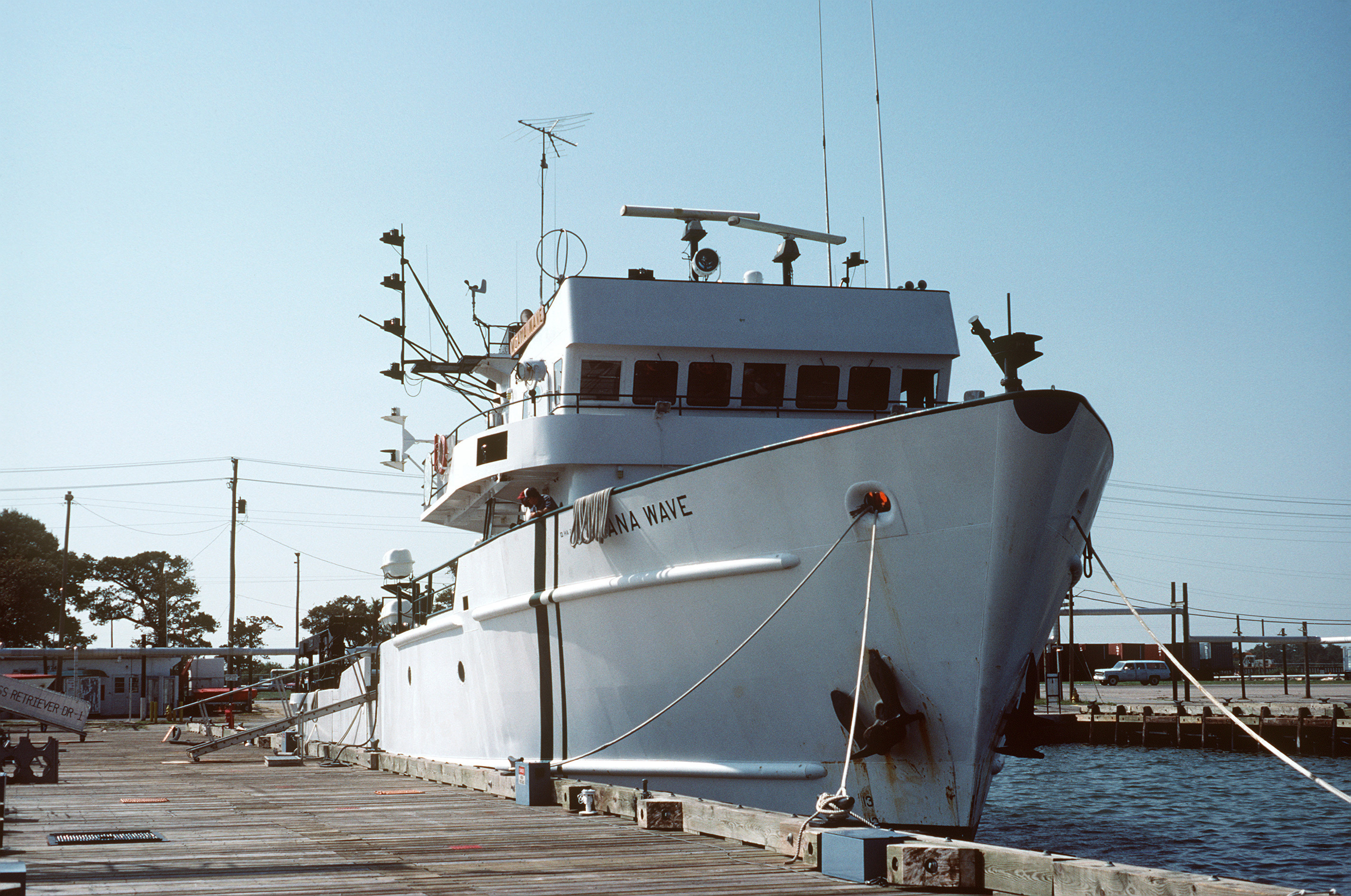
- RV Moana Wave

History

United States
- Name: Moana Wave
- Namesake: Moana Wave
- Owner: United States Navy (1974–1999); Ahtna Inc. (1999–2011); University of São Paulo (2011–present)
- Builder: Halter Marine Corporation
- Laid down: 10 October 1972
- Launched: 18 June 1973
- Acquired: 6 January 1974
- Renamed: Alpha Crucis (2011–present)
- Stricken: 30 May 1999
- Identification: IMO number: 7319008; MMSI number: 710000435; Callsign: PQ3082; Hull number: AGOR-22
- Status: Operational in Santos

General characteristics
- Class & type: Gyre-class research ship
- Displacement: 900 t (886 long tons), light; 950 t (935 long tons), full
- Length: 165 ft 0 in (50.29 m)
- Beam: 36 ft 0 in (10.97 m)
- Draft: 15 ft 0 in (4.57 m)
- Propulsion: 2 × Caterpillar 398D diesel engines
- Speed: 11 knots (20 km/h; 13 mph)
- Range: 8,000 nmi (9,200 mi; 15,000 km)
- Endurance: 60 days
- Capacity: 500,000 barrels petroleum
- Complement: 10 mariners and 23 researchers

RV Moana Wave (AGOR-22), (former USNS Moana Wave (AGOR-22)), is the second ship of the Gyre-class oceanographic research ship built in 1973.

== Construction and commissioning ==
The ship was laid down on 10 October 1972 and launched on 18 June 1973 by Halter Marine Corporation, New Orleans, Louisiana. Later acquired by the United States Navy on 6 January 1974 and later leased to the Hawaii Institute of Geophysics of the University of Hawaiʻi.

In February 1974, Moana Wave replaced the aging RV Teritu after joining RV Kana Keoki at their homeport at the Marine Expeditionary Center at Pier 18 in Honolulu Harbor. In 1977, the ship operated for six years out of Fort Lauderdale and Little Creek after reaching an agreement with Naval Electronics System Command. The agreement included the testing of Moana Wave with the newly developed Navy's Surveillance Towed Array Sensor System (SURTASS).

Moana Wave then underwent overhaul and refit which added a 9-m section towards her amidships in 1984. Returned to Honolulu later in September of that same year. Throughout 1987 and 1988, she had nearly 100,000 nautical miles (190,000 km; 120,000 mi) and 633 days at sea. The start of the Hawaii Ocean Time-series (HOT) project extended the ship's time at sea with its inaugural cruise in October 1988.

At 08:00 on 28 May 1999, Moana Wave departed Honolulu for her last voyage. In the early morning of 30 May, the lei-draped ship lowered her flag for the last time outside the university's Marine Center. She was later sold to Ahtna Inc. and overhauled again to be used in the underwater mapping and fiber optic cable industries.

In 2011, the University of São Paulo bought the ship and renamed as N/Oc Alpha Crucis. She is named after the star Alpha Crucis in the constellation Crux. Alpha Crucis was acquired through the Multiuser Equipment Program (EMU), one of the modalities of the Research Infrastructure Support Program in the State of São Paulo, maintained by FAPESP since 1995.
