= First-magnitude star =

Brightest star in the night sky

First-magnitude stars are the brightest stars in the night sky, with apparent magnitudes lower (i.e. brighter) than +1.50. Hipparchus, in the 1st century BC, introduced the magnitude scale. He allocated the first magnitude to the 20 brightest stars and the sixth magnitude to the faintest stars visible to the naked eye.

In the 19th century, this ancient scale of apparent magnitude was logarithmically defined, so that a star of magnitude 1.00 is exactly 100 times as bright as one of 6.00. The scale was also extended to even brighter celestial bodies such as Sirius (-1.5), Venus (-4), the full Moon (-12.7), and the Sun (-26.7).

== Hipparchus ==
Hipparchus ranked his stars in a very simple way. He listed the brightest stars as "of the first magnitude", which meant "the biggest." Stars less bright Hipparchus called "of the second magnitude", or second biggest. The faintest stars visible to the naked eye he called "of the sixth magnitude".

== Naked-eye magnitude system ==
During a series of lectures given in 1736 at the University of Oxford, John Keill, its then Professor of Astronomy explainedː

The fixed stars appear to be of different bignesses, not because they really are so, but because they are not all equally distant from us. Those that are nearest will excel in Lustre and Bigness; the more remote Stars will give a fainter Light, and appear smaller to the Eye. Hence arise the Distribution of Stars, according to their Order and Dignity, into Classes; the first Class containing those which are nearest to us, are called Stars of the first Magnitude; those that are next to them, are Stars of the second Magnitude ... and so forth, 'till we come to the Stars of the sixth Magnitude, which comprehend the smallest Stars that can be discerned with the bare Eye. For all the other Stars, which are only seen by the Help of a Telescope [...]

And even among those stars which are reckoned of the brightest class, there appears a variety of magnitude; for Sirius or Arcturus are each of them brighter than Aldebaran [...] And there are some Stars of such an intermedial Order, that the Astronomers have differed in classing of them; some putting the same Stars in one class, others in another. For Example: The little Dog was by Tycho placed among the Stars of the second Magnitude, which Ptolemy reckoned among the stars of the first class [...]

== Distribution in the sky ==
In the modern scale, the 20 brightest stars of Hipparchos have magnitudes between -1.5 (Sirius) and +1.6 (Bellatrix, γ Orionis). The table below shows 22 stars brighter than +1.5 magnitude, but 5 of them the Greek astronomers probably didn't know for their far southern position.

Epsilon Canis Majoris has an apparent magnitude of almost exactly 1.5, so it may be considered a first magnitude sometimes due to minor variations.

12 of the 22 brightest stars are in the actual Northern sky, with the other 10 in the Southern sky. However, in the seasonal evening sky, they are unevenly distributed: In Europe and the United States, 12–13 stars are visible in winter, but only 6–7 in summer. 9 of the brightest winter stars are part of the Winter Hexagon or surrounded by it.

== Table of the 22 first-magnitude stars ==
Of the 22 1st-magnitude stars, only 18 of them were visible in Hipparchos' Greece.

	V Mag.	Bayer designation	Proper name	Distance (ly)	Spectral class	SIMBAD
1	−1.46	α CMa	Sirius	8.6	A1 V	Sirius A
2	−0.74	α Car	Canopus	310	A9 II	Canopus
3	−0.27	α Cen AB (α^{1,2} Cen)	Alpha Centauri	4.4	G2 V + K1 V	Alpha Centauri
4	−0.05 var	α Boo	Arcturus	37	K1.5 III	Arcturus
5	0.03	α Lyr	Vega	25	A0 V	Vega
6	0.08	α Aur	Capella	42	G8 III + G0 III	Capella
7	0.12	β Ori	Rigel	860	B8 Iab	Rigel
8	0.34	α CMi	Procyon	11	F5 IV-V	Procyon
9	0.42 var	α Ori	Betelgeuse	640	M2 Iab	Betelgeuse
10	0.50	α Eri	Achernar	140	B3 Vpe	Achernar
11	0.60	β Cen	Hadar	350	B1 III	Hadar
12	0.77	α Aql	Altair	17	A7 V	Altair
13	0.77	α Cru	Acrux	320	B1 V	Acrux A
14	0.85 var	α Tau	Aldebaran	65	K5 III	Aldebaran
15	1.04	α Vir	Spica	260	B1 III-IV + B2 V	Spica
16	1.09 var	α Sco	Antares	600	M1.5 Iab-b	Antares
17	1.15	β Gem	Pollux	34	K0 IIIb	Pollux
18	1.16	α PsA	Fomalhaut	25	A3 V	Fomalhaut
19	1.25	α Cyg	Deneb	2,600	A2 Ia	Deneb
20	1.30	β Cru	Mimosa	350	B0.5 IV	Mimosa
21	1.39	α Leo	Regulus	77	B8 IV	Regulus
22	1.50	ε CMa	Adhara	430	B2 II	Adhara

== First-magnitude deep-sky objects ==
Beside stars there are also deep-sky objects that are first-magnitude objects, accumulatively brighter than +1.50, such as the Large Magellanic Cloud, Milky Way, Carina Nebula, Hyades, Pleiades, and the Alpha Persei Cluster (with Eta Carinae, Theta Tauri, Alcyone, and Mirfak as the brightest stars of the latter four, respectively).

== See also ==
- Absolute magnitude
- List of brightest stars

== Literature ==
- Jeffrey Bennett et al., 2010: Astronomie. Die kosmische Perspektive (Ed. Harald Lesch), Chapter 15.1 (p. 735–737). Pearson Studium Verlag, München, ISBN 978-3-8273-7360-1
- H.Bernhard, D.Bennett, H.Rice, 1948: New Handbook of the Heavens, Chapter 5 (Stars of the Southern Sky). MaGraw-Hill, New York
- Patrick Moore, 1996: Brilliant Stars Cassell Publishers Limited ISBN 978-0-3043-4903-6
- James. B Kahler, "First Magnitude: A Book of the Bright Sky". World Scientific, 2013. 239 pages. ISBN 9814417424, 9789814417426
