= Alpha Crucis (research vessel) =

Research vessel built in 1974

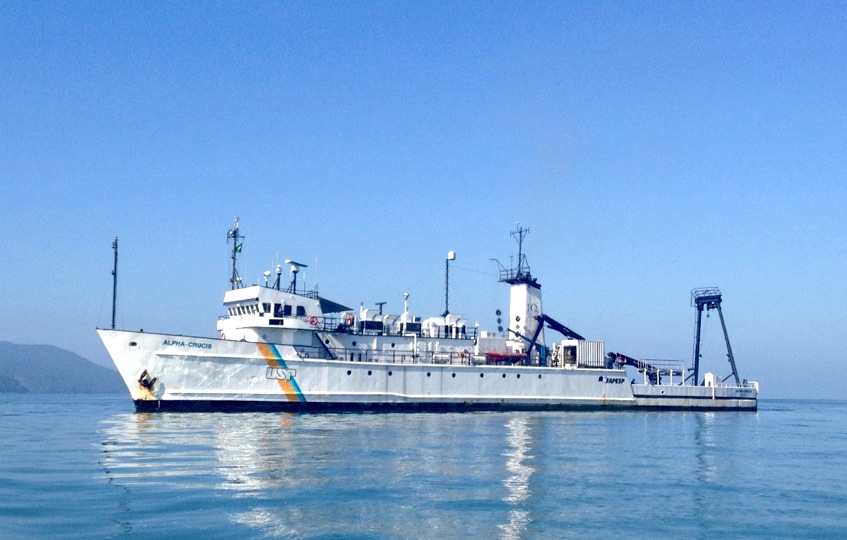
- Alpha Crucis

History
- Name: Moana Wave; Alpha Crucis
- Owner: University of Hawaii; Foundation for Research Support of the State of São Paulo
- Completed: 1974

General characteristics
- Type: Research vessel
- Length: 64 m (210 ft)
- Beam: 11 m (36 ft 1 in)
- Endurance: 40 days

Alpha Crucis is the most recent oceanographic research vessel in Brazil, replacing the older Wladimir Besnard research vessel. It is named after the Alpha Crucis star system that represents São Paulo state in the Brazilian flag. It is 64 metres (210 ft) long and 11 metres (36 ft 1 in) wide, and has capacity for 25 researchers and is capable of remaining 40 days without being resupplied.

== Acquisition ==
The vessel was built in 1974, and was originally called Moana Wave. It was firstly owned by the University of Hawaii. In 2010, the Foundation for Research Support of the State of São Paulo funded the acquisition of Alpha Crucis after a fire in 2008 rendered RV Wladimir Besnard inoperable. It is now administered by the University of São Paulo.

== Projects ==
The vessel is being used for several research projects in Brazil, in topics such as global climate change and biodiversity.
