= Delta Crucis =

Star in the constellation Crux

- Location of δ Crucis (circled)

Observation data Epoch J2000 Equinox ICRS
- Constellation: Crux
- Right ascension: 12^{h} 15^{m} 08.71673^{s}
- Declination: −58° 44′ 56.1369″
- Apparent magnitude (V): 2.78 to 2.84

Characteristics
- Spectral type: B2 IV
- U−B color index: −0.921
- B−V color index: −0.235
- Variable type: β Cep

Astrometry
Radial velocity (R_{v})	+22.2 km/s
Proper motion (μ)	RA: −35.81 mas/yr Dec.: −10.36 mas/yr
Parallax (π)	9.45±0.15 mas
Distance	345 ± 5 ly (106 ± 2 pc)
Absolute magnitude (M_{V})	−3.2

Details
Mass	8.9±0.1 M_{☉}
Radius	7.21 ± 0.75 (Note: Calculated, using the Stefan-Boltzmann law and the star's effective temperature and luminosity, with respect to the solar nominal effective temperature of 5,772 K: $$\sqrt{\biggl(\frac{5,772}{10^{4.31}}\biggr)^4 \cdot 10^{3.91}} = 7.21\ R_\odot.$$) R_{☉}
Luminosity	8,100+1,900 −1,500 L_{☉}
Surface gravity (log g)	3.88 cgs
Temperature	20,400 K
Rotational velocity (v sin i)	210 km/s
Age	18.1±3.2 Myr

Other designations
- Imai, Delta Cru, δ Cru, CD−58 4466, FK5 455, HD 106490, HIP 59747, HR 4656, SAO 239791

Database references
SIMBAD	data

Delta Crucis is a star in the southern constellation of Crux. It has the proper name Imai, pronounced /ˈiːmaɪ/, which was adopted by the International Astronomical Union on 10 August 2018. This is the faintest of the four bright stars that form the prominent asterism known as the Southern Cross. It is visible to the naked eye with an apparent visual magnitude of 2.8. Imai is a massive, hot and rapidly rotating star that is in the process of evolving into a giant. It is located at a distance of about 345 light-years (106 parsecs) from the Sun.

== Nomenclature ==
δ Crucis (Latinised to Delta Crucis) is the star's Bayer designation. It is abbreviated Delta Cru or δ Cru.

The International Astronomical Union Working Group on Star Names (WGSN) approved the name Imai for this star on 10 August 2018 and it is in the list of IAU-approved star names. Imai is the name given to this star by the Mursi people of modern-day Ethiopia. The star Imai has some significance as when it "ceases to appear in the evening sky at dusk (around the end of August), it is said that the Omo River rises high enough to flatten the imai grass that grows along its banks, and then subsides." The Mursi use a series of southern stars to mark their calendar to track seasonal flooding of the Omo River: Imai along with β Crucis (Thaadoi), β Centauri (Waar), and α Centauri (Sholbi).

It is sometimes called Pálida (Pale [one]) in Portuguese.

In Chinese, 十字架 (Shí Zì Jià), meaning Cross, refers to an asterism consisting of δ Crucis, γ Crucis, α Crucis and β Crucis. Consequently, δ Crucis itself is known as 十字架四 (Shí Zì Jià sì, English: the Fourth Star of Cross).

The Aranda and Luritja people around Hermannsburg, Central Australia named Iritjinga, "The Eagle-hawk", a quadrangular arrangement comprising this star, γ Cru (Gacrux), γ Cen (Muhlifain) and δ Cen (Ma Wei).

== Properties ==
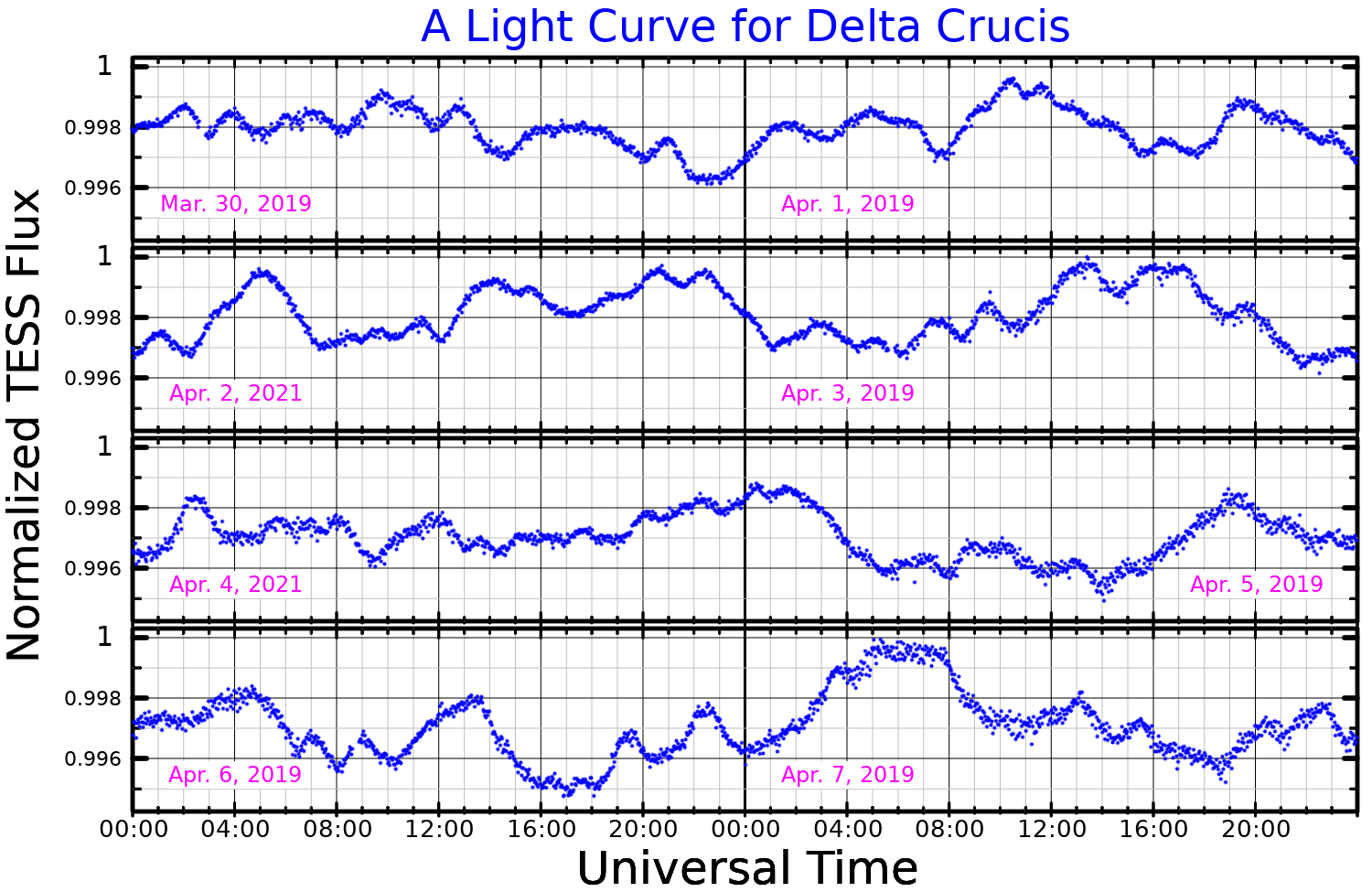
A light curve for Delta Crucis, plotted from TESS data

This star has a stellar classification of B2 IV, which suggests it is a subgiant star that is in the process of evolving away from the main sequence and becoming a red giant. Presently it is radiating around 8,100 times the luminosity of the Sun from its outer atmosphere at an effective temperature of 20,400 K, causing it to glow with a blue-white hue. Delta Crucis is a strong candidate Beta Cephei variable. However, this is disputed. Its rotation is very fast, with a projected rotational velocity of 210 km s^{−1}.

Delta Crucis is a member of the Lower Centaurus Crux (LCC) component of the Scorpius–Centaurus association, which is an OB association of massive stars that share a common origin and motion through space. This is the nearest OB association to the Sun, with the LCC component having an age in the range of 16–20 million years.

== In culture ==
δ Cru is represented in the flags of Australia, New Zealand, Samoa and Papua New Guinea as one of the stars comprising the Southern Cross. It is also featured in the flag of Brazil, along with 26 other stars, each of which represents a state. δ Cru represents the state of Minas Gerais.
