= Beta Centauri =

Triple star system in the constellation Centaurus

β Centauri/Hadar
- Location of β Centauri (circled)

Observation data Epoch J2000 Equinox ICRS
- Constellation: Centaurus
- Right ascension: 14^{h} 03^{m} 49.40535^{s}
- Declination: −60° 22′ 22.9266″
- Apparent magnitude (V): 0.61

Characteristics
- Evolutionary stage: main sequence
- Spectral type: B1 III
- U−B color index: −0.98
- B−V color index: −0.23
- Variable type: β Cep/SPB

Astrometry
Radial velocity (R_{v})	+9.59+0.23 −0.21 km/s
Proper motion (μ)	RA: −33.27 mas/yr Dec.: −23.16 mas/yr
Parallax (π)	9.04±0.04 mas
Distance	361 ± 2 ly (110.6 ± 0.5 pc)
Absolute magnitude (M_{V})	−4.9±0.2

Orbit
Primary	β Cen Aa
Secondary	β Cen Ab
Period (P)	356.915±0.015 d (0.97720±0.00004 yr)
Semi-major axis (a)	0.02515+0.09 −0.08″
Eccentricity (e)	0.8245±0.006
Inclination (i)	67.68±0.12°
Longitude of the node (Ω)	108.80+0.14 −0.15°
Periastron epoch (T)	2452000.15202
Argument of periastron (ω) (secondary)	60.87+0.26 −0.25°
Semi-amplitude (K_{1}) (primary)	62.9 km/s
Semi-amplitude (K_{2}) (secondary)	72.35 km/s

Orbit
Primary	β Cen A
Secondary	β Cen B
Period (P)	288.267 yr
Semi-major axis (a)	0.870″

Details

β Cen Aa
Mass	12.02±0.13 M_{☉}
Radius	9.16 (Note: Radius calculated using angular diameters (0.77 and 0.72 milliarcseconds) and a parallax of 9.04 milliarcseconds via the equation R/R_{☉} = (107.5 • 𝜃)/π, where 𝜃 is the angular diameter and π is the parallax. Sources: Angular diameters—J Davis et al. (2006) Parallax—Pigulski et al. 2016) R_{☉}
Luminosity	31,600+18,500 −11,700 L_{☉}
Surface gravity (log g)	3.55±0.11 cgs
Temperature	25,000±2,000 K
Rotational velocity (v sin i)	190±20 km/s
Age	14.1±0.6 Myr

β Cen Ab
Mass	10.58±0.18 M_{☉}
Radius	8.56 R_{☉}
Luminosity	25,100+14,700 −9,300 L_{☉}
Surface gravity (log g)	3.55±0.11 cgs
Temperature	23,000±2,000 K
Rotational velocity (v sin i)	75±15 km/s
Age	14.1±0.6 Myr

β Cen B
Mass	4.61 M_{☉}
Age	14.1±0.6 Myr

Other designations
- Hadar, Agena, CD−59°5054, CPD−59°5365, FK5 518, GC 18971, HD 122451, HIP 68702, HR 5267, SAO 252582, CCDM J14038-6022

Database references
SIMBAD	data

Beta Centauri is a triple star system in the southern constellation of Centaurus. It is officially called Hadar (/ˈheɪdɑːr/). The Bayer designation of Beta Centauri is Latinised from β Centauri, and abbreviated Beta Cen or β Cen. The system's combined apparent visual magnitude of 0.61 makes it the second-brightest object in Centaurus and the eleventh brightest star in the night sky. According to dynamical parallax measurements, the distance to this system is about 361 light-years (111 parsecs).

== Nomenclature ==
β Centauri (Latinised to Beta Centauri) is the star system's Bayer designation.

It bore the traditional names Hadar and Agena. Hadar comes from the Arabic حضار (the root's meaning is "to be present" or "on the ground" or "settled, civilized area"), while the name Agena /əˈdʒiːnə/ is thought to be derived from the Latin genua, meaning "knees", from the star's position on the left knee of the centaur depicted in the constellation Centaurus. In 2016, the International Astronomical Union organized a Working Group on Star Names (WGSN) to catalog and standardize proper names for stars. The WGSN approved the name Hadar for the star β Centauri Aa on 21 August 2016 and it is now so entered in the IAU Catalog of Star Names.

The Chinese name for the star is 马腹一 (Mandarin: mǎ fù yī, "the First Star of the Horse's Abdomen").

The Boorong people indigenous to what is now northwestern Victoria, Australia named it Bermbermgle (together with α Centauri), two brothers who were noted for their courage and destructiveness, and who spear and kill Tchingal, "The Emu" (Coalsack Nebula). The Wotjobaluk people name the two brothers Bram-bram-bult.

The Mursi people of Ethiopia call this star Waar; it forms an asterism with δ Crucis (Imai), β Crucis (Thaadoi), and α Centauri (Sholbi).

== Visibility ==
Beta Centauri is one of the brightest stars in the sky at magnitude 0.61. Its brightness varies by a few hundredths of a magnitude, too small to be noticeable to the naked eye. Because of its spectral type and the detection of pulsations, the Aa component has been classified as a β Cephei variable.

Beta Centauri is well known in the Southern Hemisphere as the inner of the two "Pointers" to the constellation Crux, popularly known as the Southern Cross. A line made from the other pointer, Alpha Centauri, through Beta Centauri leads to within a few degrees of Gacrux, the star at the north end of the cross. Using Gacrux, a navigator can draw a line with Acrux at the south end to effectively determine south.

== Stellar system ==
The Beta Centauri system is made up of three stars: Beta Centauri Aa, Beta Centauri Ab, and Beta Centauri B. All the spectral lines detected are consistent with a B1-type star, with only the line profiles varying, so it is thought that all three stars have the same spectral type.

In 1935, Joan Voûte identified Beta Centauri B, giving it the identifier VOU 31. The companion is separated from the primary by 1.3 arcseconds, and has remained so since the discovery, although the position angle has changed six degrees since. Beta Centauri B is a B1 dwarf with an apparent magnitude of 4.

In 1967, Beta Centauri's observed variation in radial velocity suggested that Beta Centauri A is a binary star. This was confirmed in 1999. It consists of a pair of stars, β Centauri Aa and β Centauri Ab, of similar mass that orbit each other over a period of 357 days with a large eccentricity of about 0.8245.

The pair were calculated to be separated by a mean distance of roughly 4 astronomical units (based on a distance to the system of 161 parsecs) in 2005.

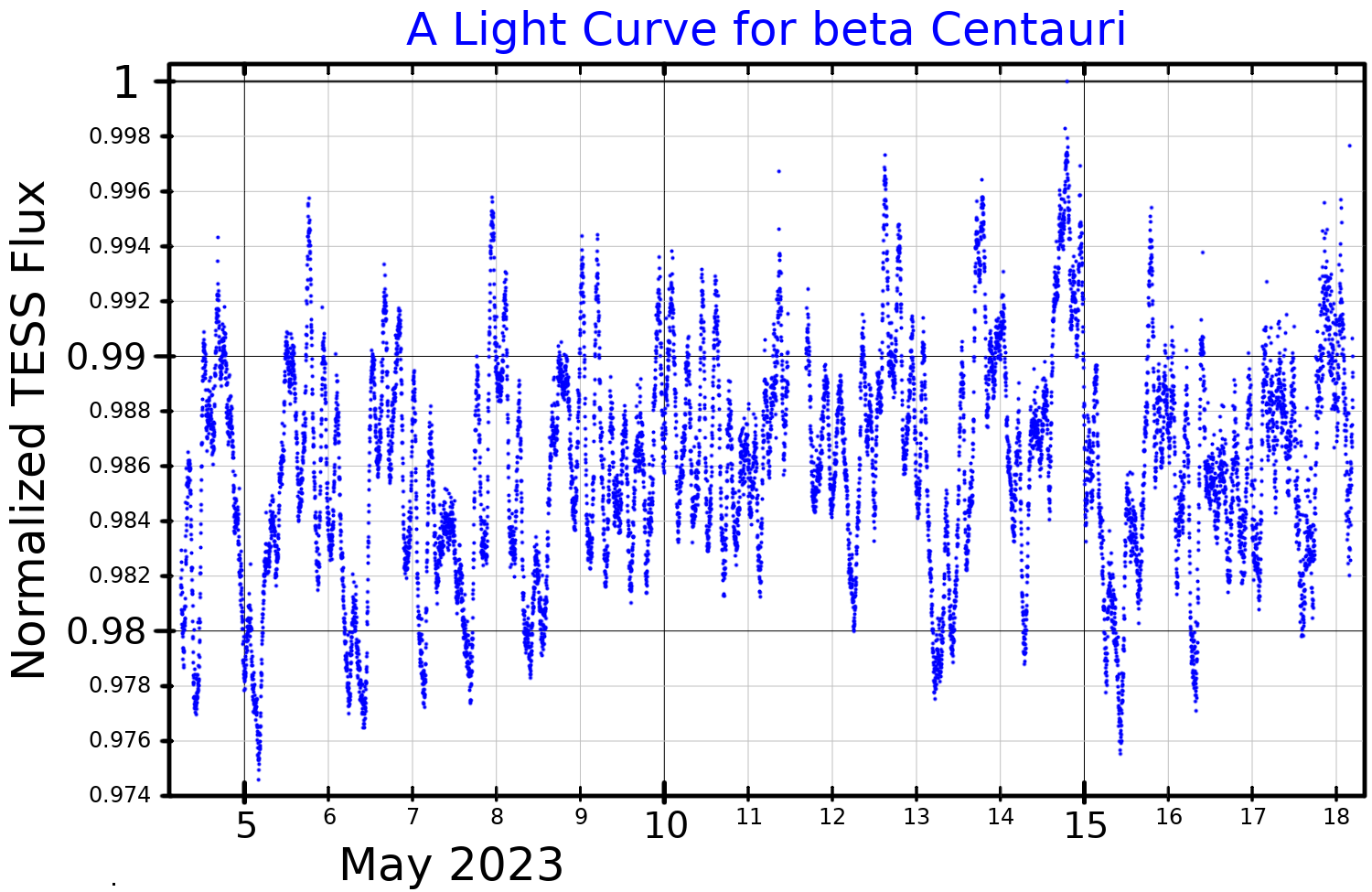
A light curve for Beta Centauri, plotted from TESS data.

Both Aa and Ab apparently have a stellar classification of B1 III, with the luminosity class of III indicating giant stars that are evolving away from the main sequence. Component Aa rotates much more rapidly than Ab, causing its spectral lines to be broader, and so the two components can be distinguished in the spectrum. Component Ab, the slow-rotating star, has a strong magnetic field although no detected abundance peculiarities in its spectrum. Multiple pulsations modes have been detected in component Aa, some of which correspond to brightness variations, so this star is considered to be variable. The detected pulsation modes correspond to those for both β Cephei variables and slowly pulsating B stars. Similar pulsations have not been detected in component Ab, but it is possible that it is also a variable star.

Aa is 12.02 times as massive as the Sun, while Ab is 10.58 times as massive. The angular diameter of Aa is estimated at 0.77 milliarcseconds; at the system's distance of 110.6±0.5 pc that gives a radius of 9.2 solar radii. That of Ab is 0.72, for a radius of 8.6.

Aa and Ab both have sufficient mass to explode as supernovas, while component B will become a white dwarf after a red giant phase.
