= Acrux =

Septuple star system in the constellation Crux

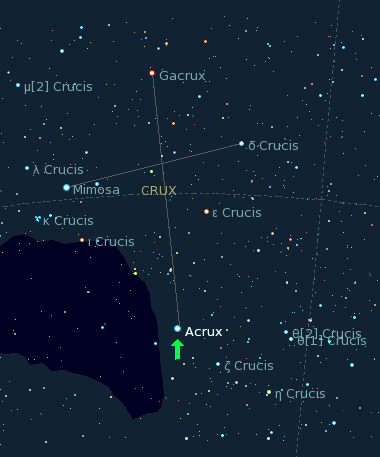
- The position of Acrux

Observation data Epoch J2000 Equinox ICRS
- Constellation: Crux
- Pronunciation: /ˈeɪkrʌks/
- α Crucis AB
- Right ascension: 12^{h} 26^{m} 35.89522^{s}
- Declination: −63° 05′ 56.7343″
- Apparent magnitude (V): 0.76 (combined); 1.33 (A) + 1.75 (B)
- α Crucis C
- Right ascension: 12^{h} 26^{m} 30.8829^{s}
- Declination: −63° 07′ 20.047″
- Apparent magnitude (V): 4.86 (Ca + Cb); 13.36 (D)

Characteristics
- Spectral type: B0.5 IV (Aa); B1 V (B); B5 V (Ca); M0 V (D)
- U−B color index: −0.59 (C)
- B−V color index: −0.26 (AB) −0.12 (C)
- Variable type: β Cep + β Cep (Note: It is not known if the variability is coming from the α Crucis A or the α Crucis B system; more data is needed to uncover which one is the pulsator.)

Astrometry

α Crucis AB
| Radial velocity (R_{v}) | +19.2±0.8 km/s |
| Proper motion (μ) | RA: −35.83 mas/yr Dec.: −14.86 mas/yr |
| Parallax (π) | 10.13±0.50 mas |
| Distance | 348±5 ly (106.7±1.5 pc) |
| Absolute magnitude (M_{V}) | −3.77 |

α Crucis C
| Radial velocity (R_{v}) | +27 km/s |
| Proper motion (μ) | RA: −39.548 mas/yr Dec.: −13.760 mas/yr |
| Parallax (π) | 9.3964±0.1289 mas |
| Distance | 348±5 ly (106.7±1.5 pc) |
| Absolute magnitude (M_{V}) | −0.98 |

Orbit
| Primary | α Crucis Aa |
| Secondary | α Crucis Ab |
| Period (P) | 75.7469±0.0017 d |
| Semi-major axis (a) | (9.48±0.30)×10^{−3}" (1.01±0.04 au) |
| Eccentricity (e) | 0.369±0.015 |
| Inclination (i) | 66.2±1.4° |
| Longitude of the node (Ω) | 225.0±2.0° |
| Periastron epoch (T) | 2,458,183.1±0.4 JD |
| Argument of periastron (ω) (secondary) | 229.5±2.2° |
| Semi-amplitude (K_{1}) (primary) | 40.6±0.9 km/s |

Orbit (Note: While the orbit listed below is the best possibility, a second set of orbits implying a smaller orbital period among other different elements cannot be ruled out yet by the observations.)
| Primary | α Crucis Ba |
| Secondary | α Crucis Bb |
| Period (P) | 405.4+0.4 −0.3 d |
| Semi-major axis (a) | (28.2±0.8)×10^{−3}" (3.0 au) |
| Eccentricity (e) | 0.36+0.45 −0.07 |
| Inclination (i) | 94.4+2.6 −0.3° |
| Longitude of the node (Ω) | 86.0+3.4 −6.1° |
| Periastron epoch (T) | 2,458,099+258 −145 JD |
| Argument of periastron (ω) (secondary) | 105.2+32.1 −55.3° |

Orbit
| Primary | α Crucis Ca |
| Secondary | α Crucis Cb |
| Period (P) | 1.225155±0.000005 d |
| Semi-major axis (a) | ≥1.044 R_{☉} |
| Eccentricity (e) | 0.024±0.014 |
| Periastron epoch (T) | 2438903.314±0.003 JD |
| Argument of periastron (ω) (secondary) | 314±34° |
| Semi-amplitude (K_{1}) (primary) | 43.1±0.6 km/s |

Details

α Crucis Aa
| Mass | 17.2±1.2 M_{☉} |
| Radius | 6.8 R_{☉} |
| Luminosity | 31,110+3,190 −2,910 L_{☉} |
| Temperature | 28,950 K |
| Rotational velocity (v sin i) | 84 km/s |
| Age | 7.1 Myr |

α Crucis Ab
| Mass | 6.8±0.3 M_{☉} |
| Radius | 3.2 R_{☉} |
| Luminosity | 1,400 (Note: Derived from known radius and surface temperature of star.) L_{☉} |
| Temperature | 19,750 K |
| Age | 7.1 Myr |

α Crucis Ba
| Mass | 12.4 M_{☉} |
| Radius | 5.4 R_{☉} |
| Luminosity | 14,000 L_{☉} |
| Surface gravity (log g) | 4.00 cgs |
| Temperature | 26,950 K |
| Rotational velocity (v sin i) | 200 km/s |
| Age | 7.1 Myr |

α Crucis Bb
| Mass | 9.8 M_{☉} |
| Radius | 4.4 R_{☉} |
| Luminosity | 6,100 L_{☉} |
| Temperature | 24,350 K |
| Age | 7.1 Myr |

α Crucis Ca
| Mass | 4.5 M_{☉} |
| Radius | 2.5 R_{☉} |
| Luminosity | 380 L_{☉} |
| Surface gravity (log g) | 4.05 cgs |
| Temperature | 15,900 K |
| Rotational velocity (v sin i) | 131 km/s |
| Age | 7.1 Myr |

α Crucis Cb
| Mass | ≥0.64 M_{☉} |
| Age | 7.1 Myr |

α Crucis D
| Mass | 0.5 M_{☉} |
| Age | 7.1 Myr |

Other designations
- α Crucis, CPD−62°2745, HIP 60718, CCDM J12266-6306, WDS J12266-6306
- α Cru A: Acrux, α^{1} Crucis, 26 G. Crucis, FK5 462, GC 16952, HD 108248, HR 4730
- α Cru B: α^{2} Crucis, 27 G. Crucis, GC 16953, HD 108249, HR 4731, 2MASS J12263615-6305571
- α Cru C: 25 G. Crucis, CPD−62°2742, GC 16951, HD 108250, HR 4729

Database references
| SIMBAD | α Cru |
- α Crucis A
- α Crucis B
- α Crucis C

Acrux is a multiple star system and the brightest star in the southern constellation of Crux. It has the Bayer designation α Crucis, which is Latinised to Alpha Crucis and abbreviated Alpha Cru or α Cru. With a combined visual magnitude of +0.76, it is the 13th-brightest star in the night sky. It is the most southerly star of the asterism known as the Southern Cross and is the southernmost first-magnitude star, 2.3 degrees more southerly than Alpha Centauri. This system is located at a distance of 348 light-years (106.7 parsecs) from the Sun.

To the naked eye Acrux appears as a single star, but it is actually a multiple star system containing seven components. Through optical telescopes, Acrux appears as a triple star, whose two brightest components are visually separated by about 4 arcseconds and are known as α Cru A and α Cru B, α^{1} Crucis and α^{2} Crucis, or α Crucis A and α Crucis B. Both components are B-type stars, and are many times more massive and luminous than the Sun. This system was the second ever to be recognized as a binary, in 1685 by a Jesuit priest. α^{1} and α^{2} Crucis are close binaries themselves, with components designated α Crucis Aa (officially named Acrux, historically the name of the entire system), α Crucis Ab, α Crucis Ba, and α Crucis Bb.

α Cru C, also known as HR 4729, is a more distant companion, forming a triple star through small telescopes. C is a spectroscopic binary and has a faint companion, which brings the total number of stars in the system to seven.

== Nomenclature ==
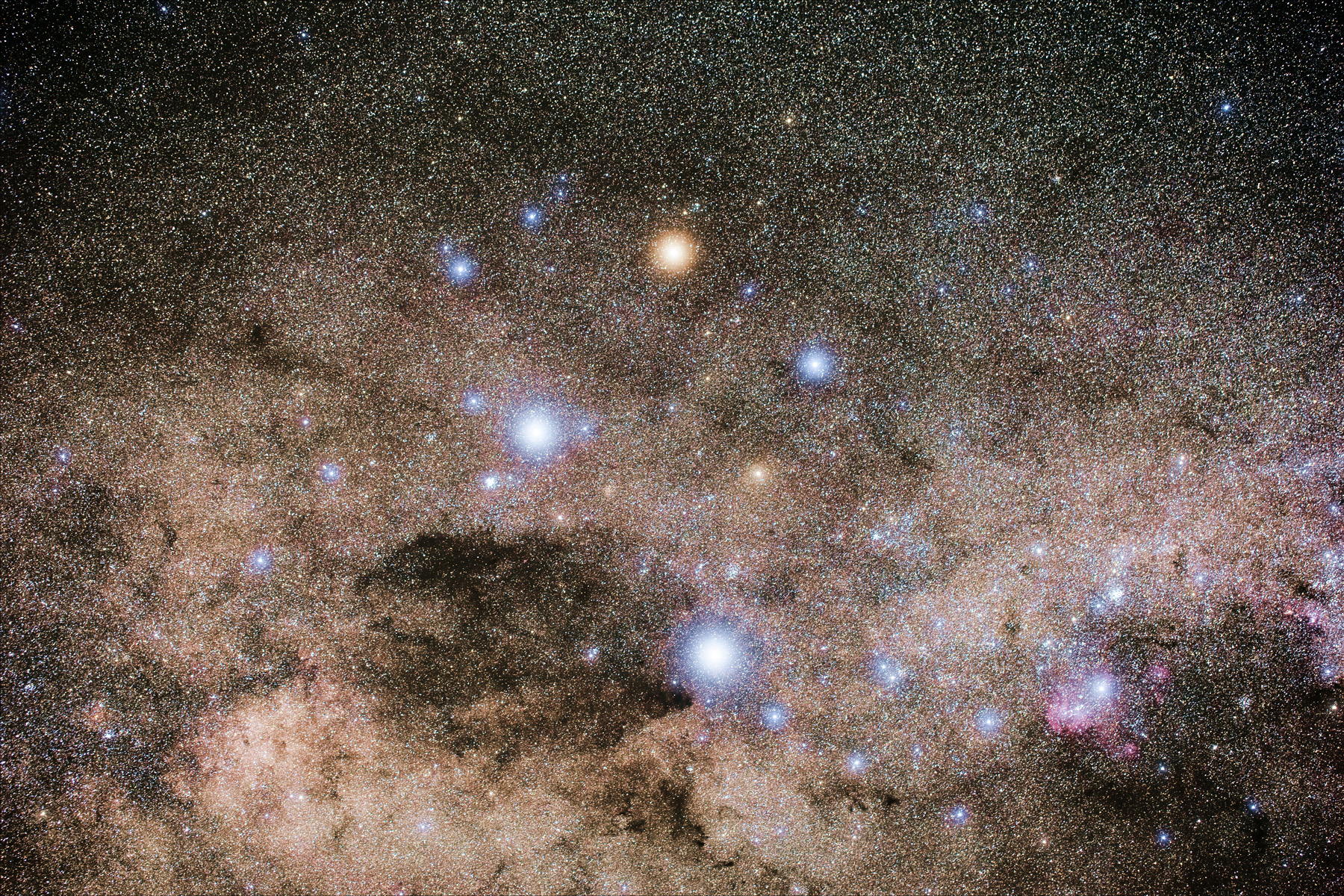
The constellation Crux. Acrux is the star at the foot of the cross.

α Crucis (Latinised to Alpha Crucis) is the system's Bayer designation, assigned by Lacaille in 1756; it was originally designated ζ Centauri by Bayer, which now refers to a different star. α^{1} and α^{2} Crucis refer to its two main component stars. The designations of these two constituents as α Cru A and α Cru B and those of A's components—α Cru Aa and α Cru Ab—derive from the convention used by the Washington Multiplicity Catalog (WMC) for multiple star systems, and adopted by the International Astronomical Union (IAU).

The name Acrux for α Crucis was coined in the 19th century by American astronomer Elijah Hinsdale Burritt as a contraction of its Bayer designation. In 2016, the International Astronomical Union organized a Working Group on Star Names (WGSN) to catalog and standardize proper names for stars. The WGSN states that in the case of multiple stars the name should be understood to be attributed to the brightest component by visual brightness. The WGSN approved the name Acrux for the star α Cru Aa on 20 July 2016 and it is now so entered in the IAU Catalog of Star Names.

Since Acrux is at −63° declination, making it the southernmost first-magnitude star, it is only visible south of latitude 27° North. It barely rises from cities such as Miami, United States, or Karachi, Pakistan (both around 25°N) and not at all from New Orleans, United States, or Cairo, Egypt (both about 30°N). Because of Earth's axial precession, the star was visible to ancient Hindu astronomers in India who named it Tri-shanku. It was also visible to the ancient Romans and Greeks, who regarded it as part of the constellation of Centaurus.

In Chinese, 十字架 (Shí Zì Jià, "Cross"), refers to an asterism consisting of Acrux, Mimosa, Gamma Crucis and Delta Crucis. Consequently, Acrux itself is known as 十字架二 (Shí Zì Jià èr, "the Second Star of Cross").

This star is known as Estrela de Magalhães ("Star of Magellan") in Portuguese.

== Stellar properties ==
| Aa |
| Period = 75.75 d |
| Ab |
| Period ≈ 1,300 yr |
| Ba |
| Period = 405 d |
| Bb |
| Period ≈ 130,000 yr |
| Ca |
| Period = 1.22 d |
| Cb |
| Period ≈ 1,500 yr |
| D |

Hierarchy of orbits in the system

=== α Crucis AB ===
The two innermost visual components of Acrux are α Crucis A (α^{1} Crucis) and α Crucis B (α^{2} Crucis), separated by 3.9". α^{1} is magnitude 1.33 whereas α^{2} is magnitude 1.75. Spectral types of B0.5 IV and B1 V have been assigned for the components, showing that they are hot B-type stars. They orbit over such a long period that motion is only barely seen. From their projected separation of 430 astronomical units, the period is estimated to be around 1,300 years. α^{1} and α^{2} are binaries themselves, with α^{1} being a single-lined spectroscopic binary and α^{2} an interferometric binary.

The components of α^{1} have masses of 17 and 6.8 times that of the Sun (M_{☉}), estimated radii of 6.8 and 3.2 R_{☉}, and effective temperatures of approximately 29,000 and 20,000 K. They take 75.747 days to complete an orbit around each other at a semi-major axis of almost exactly one astronomical unit (au), with a considerable orbital eccentricity of 0.37. The mass of α^{1} Crucis A suggest that it is going to expand into a red supergiant (similar to Betelgeuse and Antares) before exploding as supernovae. Component Ab may perform electron capture in the degenerate O+Ne+Mg core and trigger a supernova explosion, otherwise it will become a massive white dwarf.

The components of α^{2} have masses estimated at 12.4 and 9.8 M_{☉}, radii at 5.4 and 4.4 R_{☉}, and effective temperatures at 26,950 and 24,350 K, respectively. Their orbit is not so well-constrained, with a likely orbital period of 405.4 days, semi-major axis of 3.0 au and eccentricity of 0.40, although an orbital period of 202.9 days coupled with a higher eccentricity of 0.64 and a semi-major axis of 1.90 au is still possible. The orbits of the α^{1} and α^{2} systems are significantly misaligned with each other, indicating that the system was initially an unstable multiple system which underwent dynamical unfolding.

Photometry with the TESS satellite has shown that one of the stars in the α Crucis system is a β Cephei variable, although α^{1} and α^{2} Crucis are too close for TESS to resolve and determine which one is the pulsator.

Rizzuto and colleagues determined in 2011 that the α Crucis system was 66% likely to be a member of the Lower Centaurus–Crux sub-group of the Scorpius–Centaurus association. It was not previously seen to be a member of the group. A bow shock is present around α Crucis, and is visible in the infrared spectrum, but is not aligned with α Crucis; the bow shock likely formed from large-scale motions in the interstellar matter.

=== α Crucis C ===
α Crucis C, also known as HD 108250 and HR 4729, has an apparent magnitude of 4.79 and lies 90 arcseconds away from triple star system α Crucis AB. It shares common proper motion with α Cru AB, and it is therefore generally assumed to be physically associated. The projected separation between both systems is 9,600 astronomical units (au), which together with the components' masses, implies an orbital period of 130,000 years. It was first observed in 1829, as a companion to α Crucis, by James Dunlop from Paramatta in New South Wales.

α Crucis C is itself a single-lined spectroscopic binary system, initially uncovered in 1916, although the orbital elements were not known until 1979. The two components orbit around each other with an orbital period of roughly 1.225 days. The primary is a B-type star with a spectral class of B5 V. It is estimated to be 4.5 times more massive than the Sun and 2.5 times larger. Nothing is known about the secondary but a lower limit on its mass of 0.64 M_{☉}.

=== α Crucis D ===
A close companion to α Crucis C, α Crucis D is magnitude 13.36 red dwarf star with a spectral type of M0V and half the mass of the Sun. It has been first identified in 1999 using adaptive optics at infrared wavelengths, and is located at only 2.836" from α Crucis C. Given the projected separation of 225 au, the orbital period between it and α Crucis C is thought to be 1,500 years. It has been named α Crucis P (in order of discovery), or α Crucis D (as the fourth visible member of the system).

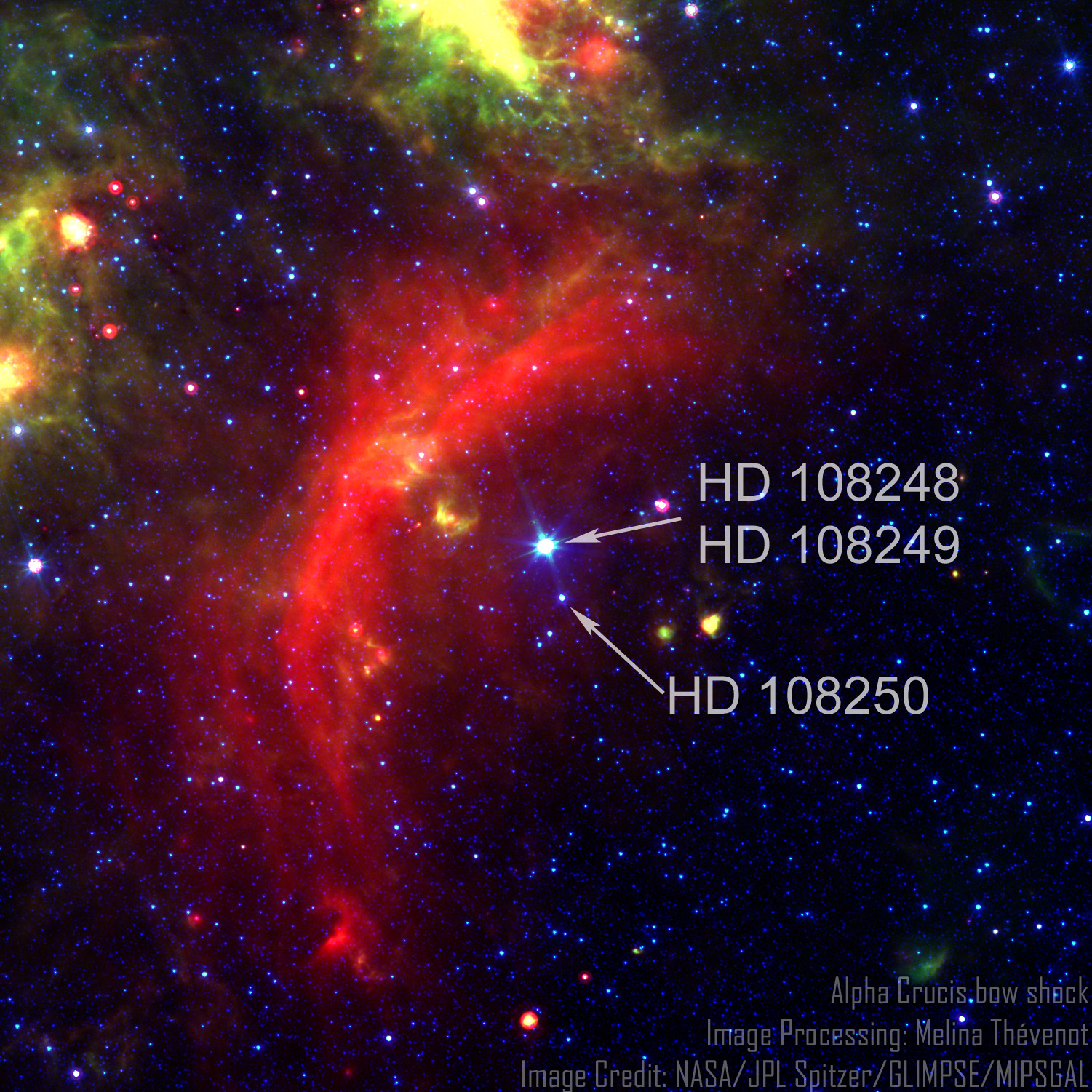
Image of α Crucis (HD 108248/9), α Crucis C (HD 108250), and the bow shock nebula from the Spitzer Space Telescope

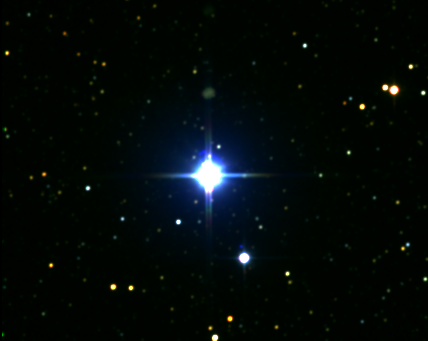
α Crucis AB and α Crucis C (the 2nd-brightest star)

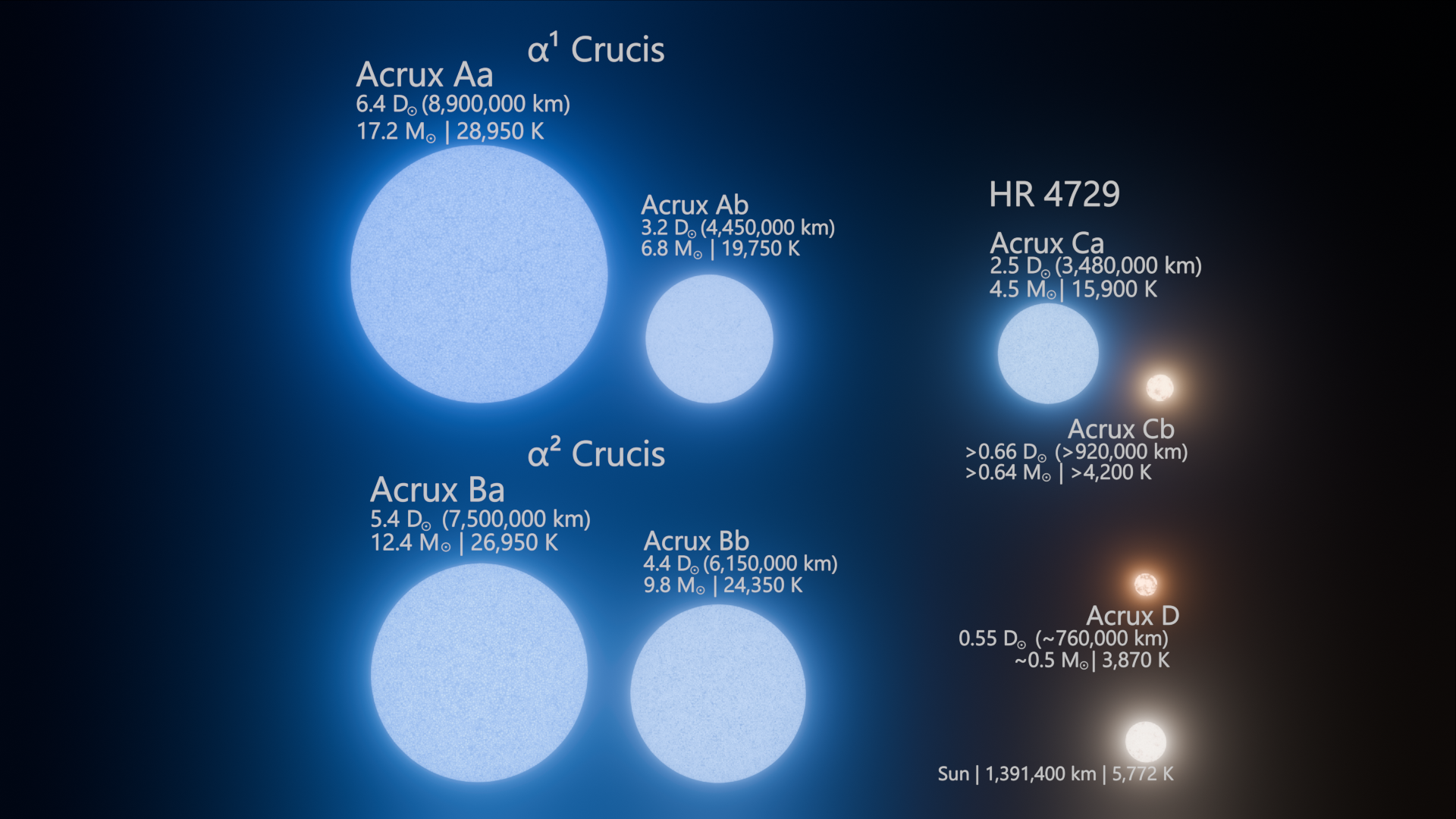
Artist's impression of the stellar components compared to the Sun

== In culture ==
Acrux is represented in the flags of Australia, New Zealand, Samoa, and Papua New Guinea as one of five stars that compose the Southern Cross. It is also featured in the flag of Brazil, along with 26 other stars, each of which represents a state; Acrux represents the state of São Paulo. As of 2015, it is also represented on the cover of the Brazilian passport.

The Brazilian oceanographic research vessel Alpha Crucis is named after the star.
