= List of stars in Chamaeleon =

This is the list of notable stars in the constellation Chamaeleon, sorted by decreasing brightness.

Name	B	Var	HD	HIP	RA	Dec	vis. mag.	abs. mag.	Dist. (ly)	Sp. class	Notes
α Cha	α		71243	40702	08^{h} 18^{m} 31.27^{s}	−76° 55′ 11.9″	4.05	2.60	63	F5III	
γ Cha	γ		92305	51839	10^{h} 35^{m} 28.22^{s}	−78° 36′ 28.1″	4.11	−1.40	413	M0III	suspected variable
β Cha	β		106911	60000	12^{h} 18^{m} 20.94^{s}	−79° 18′ 44.2″	4.24	−0.36	271	B5Vn	suspected variable
θ Cha	θ		71701	40888	08^{h} 20^{m} 38.89^{s}	−77° 29′ 04.5″	4.34	0.97	154	K0III-IV	double star
δ^{2} Cha	δ^{2}		93845	52633	10^{h} 45^{m} 47.14^{s}	−80° 32′ 24.7″	4.45	−0.79	363	B2.5IV	
ε Cha	ε		104174	58484	11^{h} 59^{m} 37.69^{s}	−78° 13′ 18.5″	4.88	−0.36	364	B9Vn	double star
κ Cha	κ		104902	58905	12^{h} 04^{m} 46.66^{s}	−76° 31′ 09.0″	5.04	−0.61	441	K4III	variable star, ΔV = 0.005^{m}, P = 3.89651 d
ζ Cha	ζ		83979	46928	09^{h} 33^{m} 53.51^{s}	−80° 56′ 28.7″	5.07	−1.02	539	B5V	β Cep variable, V_{max} = 5.06^{m}, V_{min} = 5.17^{m}, P = 1.07964 d
ι Cha	ι		82554	46107	09^{h} 24^{m} 09.73^{s}	−80° 47′ 13.9″	5.34	1.58	184	F3/F5IV	
ν Cha	ν		85396	47956	09^{h} 46^{m} 20.42^{s}	−76° 46′ 33.5″	5.43	1.59	191	G8III	
η Cha	η		75416	42637	08^{h} 41^{m} 19.60^{s}	−78° 57′ 48.3″	5.46	0.53	316	B9IV	
δ^{1} Cha	δ^{1}		93779	52595	10^{h} 45^{m} 16.38^{s}	−80° 28′ 10.3″	5.46	0.28	354	K0III	double star
μ¹ Cha	μ		87971	49065	10^{h} 00^{m} 43.90^{s}	−82° 12′ 53.1″	5.53	0.09	399	A0IV	
π Cha	π		101132	56675	11^{h} 37^{m} 15.94^{s}	−75° 53′ 47.5″	5.64	2.52	137	F1III	
HD 72922			72922	41191	08^{h} 24^{m} 20.38^{s}	−80° 54′ 53.0″	5.67	1.23	252	G8III	
HD 76236			76236	43012	08^{h} 45^{m} 55.23^{s}	−79° 30′ 16.5″	5.79	−0.38	559	K5III	variable star, ΔV = 0.008^{m}, P = 53.70569 d
HD 114533			114533	64587	13^{h} 14^{m} 17.36^{s}	−78° 26′ 50.8″	5.84	−2.94	1863	F8Ib	
HD 120213			120213	68009	13^{h} 55^{m} 38.99^{s}	−82° 39′ 58.1″	5.95	−1.19	872	K2/K3III:p	
DR Cha		DR	93237	52340	10^{h} 41^{m} 51.58^{s}	−79° 46′ 59.9″	5.97	−1.46	1000	B5IV	Algol variable, V_{max} = 5.97^{m}, V_{min} = 6.06^{m}, P = 19.4436 d; emission-line star
RS Cha		RS	75747	42794	08^{h} 43^{m} 12.31^{s}	−79° 04′ 12.5″	6.05	1.10	319	A7V	Algol variable and δ Sct variable, V_{max} = 6.02^{m}, V_{min} = 6.68^{m}, P = 1.66987 d
HD 80194			80194	45166	09^{h} 12^{m} 12.27^{s}	−76° 39′ 46.5″	6.13	0.89	364	K1III	
HD 92209			92209	51835	10^{h} 35^{m} 24.80^{s}	−76° 18′ 32.4″	6.29	0.29	517	K2III	
HD 101782			101782	56996	11^{h} 41^{m} 01.60^{s}	−83° 05′ 59.9″	6.32	1.20	344	K0III	double star
DY Cha		DY	118285	66607	13^{h} 39^{m} 12.04^{s}	−75° 41′ 01.6″	6.32	−0.95	929	B8IV	long-period pulsating variable
HD 106248			106248	59647	12^{h} 13^{m} 56.48^{s}	−78° 34′ 26.0″	6.34	1.17	353	K2/K3IIICN.	
HD 115088			115088	64951	13^{h} 18^{m} 48.34^{s}	−79° 58′ 33.5″	6.34	0.67	444	B9.5/A0V	
HD 98617			98617	55225	11^{h} 18^{m} 34.21^{s}	−79° 40′ 07.0″	6.35	2.30	210	A8IIIm...	
HD 94717			94717	53151	10^{h} 52^{m} 28.67^{s}	−79° 33′ 34.0″	6.36	−2.20	1680	K2II/III	
HD 101917			101917	57137	11^{h} 42^{m} 54.53^{s}	−79° 18′ 22.9″	6.38	2.65	182	K0III/IV	
HD 99015			99015	55497	11^{h} 21^{m} 57.11^{s}	−77° 36′ 30.1″	6.43	2.07	243	A5III/IV	
HD 113694			113694	64108	13^{h} 08^{m} 20.52^{s}	−78° 26′ 45.5″	6.43	0.73	449	A0V	double star
HD 86320			86320	48320	09^{h} 51^{m} 00.80^{s}	−80° 03′ 39.9″	6.47	−0.20	703	B8IV	
μ^{2} Cha	μ^{2}		88351	49326	10^{h} 04^{m} 07.37^{s}	−81° 33′ 56.2″	6.60	0.41	564	G6/G8III	suspected variable
HD 104237		DX	104237	58520	12^{h} 00^{m} 05.08^{s}	−78° 11′ 34.6″	6.70		374	K4Ve	T Tau star, V_{max} = 6.7^{m}, V_{min} = 10.28^{m}, P = 2.45 d
RZ Cha		RZ	93486	52381	10^{h} 42^{m} 24.10^{s}	−82° 02′ 14.2″	8.09		606	F4V	Algol variable
HD 97048		CU	97048	54413	11^{h} 08^{m} 03.32^{s}	−77° 39′ 17.4″	8.38		517	A0pshe	Orion variable, V_{max} = 8.38^{m}, V_{min} = 8.48^{m}
HD 116852			116852	65890	13^{h} 30^{m} 23.52^{s}	−78° 51′ 20.5″	8.47		9300	O9III	Obscuring line of highly ionized gas on a line of sight with Earth
HD 97300			97300	54557	11^{h} 09^{m} 50.02^{s}	−76° 37′ 40.7″	9.20		574	B9V	T Tau star in IC 2631
HD 63454			63454	37284	07^{h} 39^{m} 21.85^{s}	−78° 16′ 44.3″	9.37	6.60	117	K4V	Ceibo, has a planet (b)
R Cha		R	71793		08^{h} 21^{m} 46.42^{s}	−76° 21′ 18.5″	10.55			M4.5e	Mira variable, V_{max} = 7.5^{m}, V_{min} = 14.5^{m}, P = 338 d
Z Cha		Z			08^{h} 07^{m} 27.75^{s}	−76° 32′ 00.7″	11.50			M5.5	SU UMa and Algol variable, V_{max} = 11.5^{m}, V_{min} = 16.23^{m}, P = 0.074499315 d; possible planetary companion
T Cha		T		58285	11^{h} 57^{m} 13.55^{s}	−79° 21′ 31.54″	11.56		534	K0e	Orion variable, V_{max} = 10.09^{m}, V_{min} = 14.5^{m}, P = 3.253 d; possible planetary companion
CS Cha		CS			11^{h} 02^{m} 25^{s}	−77° 33′ 36″	11.69		575	K2Ve	T Tauri star, orbited by accreting stellar companion (B)
CT Cha		CT			11^{h} 04^{m} 09^{s}	−76° 27′ 19″	12.36		538	K7	has a planet (b); Orion variable, V_{max} = 11.7^{m}, V_{min} = 12.9^{m}
ChaHα8					11^{h} 07^{m} 46.10^{s}	−77° 40′ 08.9″	20.1	522		M5.75	binary brown dwarf system
DK Cha		DK			12^{h} 53^{m} 17.20^{s}	−77° 07′ 10.73″				F0	Orion variable
OTS 44					11^{h} 10^{m} 11.5^{s}	−76° 32′ 13″				M9.5	One of the smallest known brown dwarfs
Table legend: • Name = Proper name • B = Bayer designation • F or/and G. = Flamsteed designation or Gould designation • Var = Variable star designation • HD = Henry Draper Catalogue designation number • HIP = Hipparcos Catalogue designation number • RA = Right ascension for the Epoch/Equinox J2000.0 • Dec = Declination for the Epoch/Equinox J2000.0 • vis. mag. = visual magnitude (m or m_{v}), also known as apparent magnitude • abs. mag. = absolute magnitude (M_{v}) • Dist. (ly) = Distance in light-years from Earth • Sp. class = Spectral class of the star in the stellar classification system • Notes = Common name(s) or alternate name(s); comments; notable properties [for example: multiple star status, range of variability if it is a variable star, exoplanets, etc.]

== See also ==
- List of stars by constellation
- DI Cha, a star system (not a star) where 4 stars orbit each other
