= Chamaeleon in Chinese astronomy =

The modern constellation Chamaeleon is not included in the Three Enclosures and Twenty-Eight Mansions system of traditional Chinese uranography because its stars are too far south for observers in China to know about them prior to the introduction of Western star charts. Based on the work of Xu Guangqi and the German Jesuit missionary Johann Adam Schall von Bell in the late Ming Dynasty, this constellation has been classified as one of the 23 Southern Asterisms (近南極星區, Jìnnánjíxīngōu) under the name Little Dipper (小斗, Xiǎodǒu).

The name of the western constellation in modern Chinese is 蝘蜓座 (yǎn tíng zuò), meaning "the flying gecko constellation".

== Stars ==
The map of Chinese constellation in constellation Chamaeleon area consists of :

Four Symbols	Mansion (Chinese name)	Romanization	Translation	Asterisms (Chinese name)	Romanization	Translation	Western star name	Chinese star name	Romanization	Translation
-	近南極星區 (non-mansions)	Jìnnánjíxīngōu (non-mansions)	The Southern Asterisms (non-mansions)	小斗	Xiǎodǒu	Little Dipper				
-	近南極星區 (non-mansions)	Jìnnánjíxīngōu (non-mansions)	The Southern Asterisms (non-mansions)	小斗	Xiǎodǒu	Little Dipper	β Cha	小斗一	Xiǎodǒuyī	1st star
-	近南極星區 (non-mansions)	Jìnnánjíxīngōu (non-mansions)	The Southern Asterisms (non-mansions)	小斗	Xiǎodǒu	Little Dipper	ε Cha	小斗二	Xiǎodǒuèr	2nd star
-	近南極星區 (non-mansions)	Jìnnánjíxīngōu (non-mansions)	The Southern Asterisms (non-mansions)	小斗	Xiǎodǒu	Little Dipper	γ Cha	小斗三	Xiǎodǒusān	3rd star
-	近南極星區 (non-mansions)	Jìnnánjíxīngōu (non-mansions)	The Southern Asterisms (non-mansions)	小斗	Xiǎodǒu	Little Dipper	δ^{2} Cha	小斗四	Xiǎodǒusì	4th star
-	近南極星區 (non-mansions)	Jìnnánjíxīngōu (non-mansions)	The Southern Asterisms (non-mansions)	小斗	Xiǎodǒu	Little Dipper	ζ Cha	小斗五	Xiǎodǒuwu	5th star
-	近南極星區 (non-mansions)	Jìnnánjíxīngōu (non-mansions)	The Southern Asterisms (non-mansions)	小斗	Xiǎodǒu	Little Dipper	ι Cha	小斗六	Xiǎodǒuliù	6th star
-	近南極星區 (non-mansions)	Jìnnánjíxīngōu (non-mansions)	The Southern Asterisms (non-mansions)	小斗	Xiǎodǒu	Little Dipper	η Cha	小斗七	Xiǎodǒuqī	7th star
-	近南極星區 (non-mansions)	Jìnnánjíxīngōu (non-mansions)	The Southern Asterisms (non-mansions)	小斗	Xiǎodǒu	Little Dipper	θ Cha	小斗八	Xiǎodǒubā	8th star
-	近南極星區 (non-mansions)	Jìnnánjíxīngōu (non-mansions)	The Southern Asterisms (non-mansions)	小斗	Xiǎodǒu	Little Dipper	α Cha	小斗九	Xiǎodǒujiǔ	9th star

== See also ==
- Chinese astronomy
- Traditional Chinese star names
- Chinese constellations
