= Mu Chamaeleontis =

The Bayer designation μ Chamaeleontis (Mu Chamaeleontis) is shared by two stars, in the constellation Chamaeleon:

- μ^{1} Chamaeleontis
- μ^{2} Chamaeleontis
