= Delta Chamaeleontis =

Set index of articles associated with the same name

The Bayer designation Delta Chamaeleontis (δ Cha / δ Chamaeleontis) is shared by two star systems, in the constellation Chamaeleon:

- δ^{1} Chamaeleontis
- δ^{2} Chamaeleontis
