= HD 104237 =

Multiple star system in the constellation of Chamaeleon

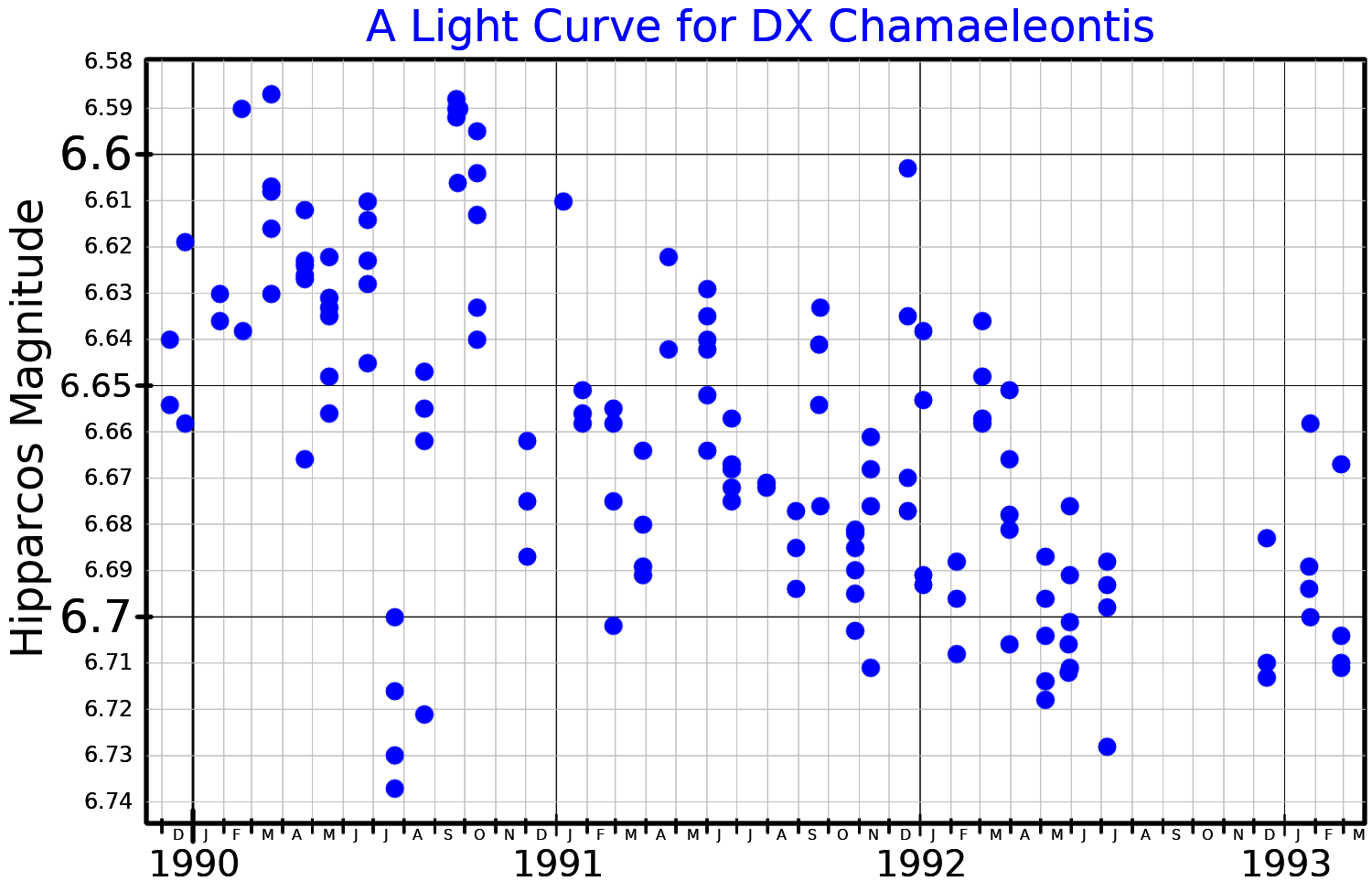
- A light curve for DX Chamaeleontis, plotted from Hipparcos data

Observation data Epoch J2000.0 Equinox ICRS
- Constellation: Chamaeleon
- Right ascension: 12^{h} 00^{m} 05.087^{s}
- Declination: −78° 11′ 34.57″
- Apparent magnitude (V): 6.59 to 6.70

Characteristics
- Evolutionary stage: Pre-main sequence
- Spectral type: A7.5Ve–A8Ve
- B−V color index: 0.241±0.008
- Variable type: Irregular

Astrometry
Proper motion (μ)	RA: −39.284 mas/yr Dec.: −5.784 mas/yr
Parallax (π)	9.3805±0.0427 mas
Distance	348 ± 2 ly (106.6 ± 0.5 pc)
Absolute magnitude (M_{V})	1.34

Orbit
Period (P)	19.856±0.002 d
Semi-major axis (a)	0.22±0.06 AU
Eccentricity (e)	0.643±0.006
Inclination (i)	17+12 −9°
Periastron epoch (T)	2,451,647.539±0.003 HJD
Semi-amplitude (K_{1}) (primary)	17.8±0.2 km/s

Details

HD 104237 A
Mass	2.2±0.2 M_{☉}
Radius	2.7±0.2 R_{☉}
Luminosity	31 L_{☉}
Temperature	8,450 K
Rotation	4.33717±0.00316 d
Rotational velocity (v sin i)	12±2 km/s
Age	2 Myr

HD 104237 B
Mass	1.4±0.3 M_{☉}

Other designations
- DX Cha, CD−77°528, GC 16412, HD 104237, HIP 58520, SAO 256895, PPM 371328, WDS J11596-7813C, WDS J12001-7812

Database references
SIMBAD	data

HD 104237 is a candidate multiple star system in the southern constellation of Chamaeleon. It has the variable star designation DX Chamaeleontis, abbreviated DX Cha; HD 104237 is the stellar designation from the Henry Draper Catalogue. The system is dimly visible to the naked eye with an apparent visual magnitude that ranges from 6.59 down to 6.70. It is located at a distance of approximately 348 light-years from the Sun based on parallax measurements. The system is positioned just 2′ to the north-east of the 5th magnitude star Epsilon Chamaeleontis, and is a member of the ε Cha association of co-moving stars.

N. Houk and A. P. Cowley found a stellar classification of 'B/A peculiar' for this object in 1975. The following year, K. G. Nehize catalogued it as a star displaying emission lines. In 1988, J. Y. Hu and associates found it to be a candidate Herbig Ae/Be star. This is a class of pre-main sequence stars that recently formed from a molecular cloud. In particular, the star displays an infrared excess associated with a dusty circumstellar shell, and its spectrum closely resembles other Herbig Ae/Be stars such as AB Aurigae and HR 5999. No characteristic molecular cloud was detected nearby, although there are small molecular clumps in the vicinity that may be the remains of a dissipating cloud.

This is the optically brightest Herbig star known, making it a useful object for investigation. Delta scuti-like pulsations have been detected with frequencies of 33.29 and 36.61 cycles per day. Analysis of the Hipparcos data showed that the star's brightness is variable. It is an X-ray source with a luminosity of 2.69×10^{30} erg·sec^{−1}, which may originate in a hot corona. DX Cha displays an ultraviolet excess, which indicates the star is still accreting matter at a rate of ≈ 10^{−8} M_{☉}·yr^{−1}. This inflow is generating a pair of jets emerging from the poles of the star. The circumstellar disk is being viewed from nearly edge on.

Infrared observations in 1996 showed evidence of an infrared source located at an angular separation of 1″, now designated component B. In 2003, optical observations combined with the Chandra X-ray Observatory indicated that five low mass, pre-main sequence objects lie within 5″, equivalent to a projected distance of 1,500 AU from the primary, component A. At least two of these are T Tauri stars. It is uncertain whether all of the nearby companions form a gravitationally bound system with the primary. The close A/B pair display radial velocity variation that indicate this is a double-lined spectroscopic binary with a K-type secondary.
