= T Chamaeleontis =

T Tauri star; Chamaeleon

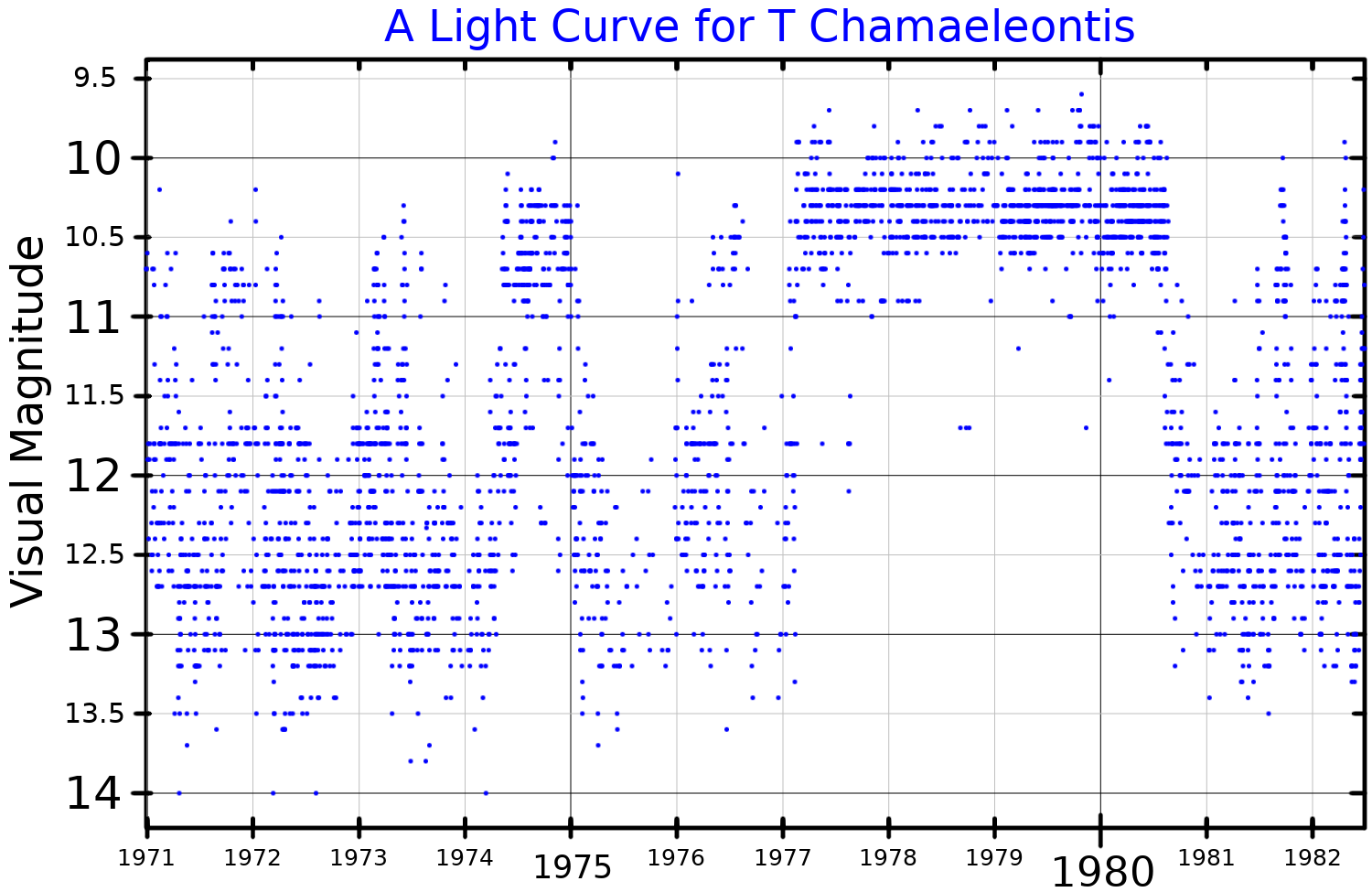
- A visual band light curve for T Chamaeleontis, plotted from AAVSO data

Observation data Epoch J2000.0 Equinox ICRS
- Constellation: Chamaeleon
- Right ascension: 11^{h} 57^{m} 13.52451^{s}
- Declination: −79° 21′ 31.5305″
- Apparent magnitude (V): 10.05 - 14.50

Characteristics
- Evolutionary stage: T Tauri star
- Spectral type: K0e
- U−B color index: +0.63
- B−V color index: +1.14
- J−K color index: +1.67
- Variable type: Orion variable

Astrometry
Radial velocity (R_{v})	13.8±0.1 km/s
Proper motion (μ)	RA: −41.586 mas/yr Dec.: −8.655 mas/yr
Parallax (π)	9.7356±0.0332 mas
Distance	335 ± 1 ly (102.7 ± 0.4 pc)
Absolute magnitude (M_{V})	+6.55

Details
Mass	0.65 M_{☉}
Radius	0.65±0.09 R_{☉}
Luminosity	0.29 L_{☉}
Surface gravity (log g)	4.50 cgs
Temperature	5,111 K
Metallicity [Fe/H]	+0.09±0.15 dex
Rotational velocity (v sin i)	39±3 km/s
Age	12.7 Myr

Other designations
- T Cha, HIP 58285, TYC 9419-1187-1, GSC 09419-01187, 2MASS J11571348-7921313

Database references
SIMBAD	data

T Chamaeleontis (T Cha), also known as HIP 58285, is a T Tauri star located in the southern circumpolar constellation Chamaeleon. It has an apparent magnitude that ranges from 10.05 to 14.50, which is below the limit for naked eye visibility. Gaia DR3 parallax measurements place the object 335 light years away and it is currently receding with a heliocentric radial velocity of 13.8 km/s. At its current distance, T Cha's average brightness is diminished by 0.31 magnitudes due to extinction from interstellar dust. It has an average absolute magnitude of +6.55.

== History ==
The object was first suspected to be a RW Aurigae-type star in 1949. It was categorized as a T-Tauri star in 1975. In the same year, it was suspected to be variable and the variability was confirmed in 1976. A 1993 paper said that it might be a weak-lined YY Orionis star. T Cha might be either a member of the young ε Chamaeleontis association or the slightly older η Chamaeleontis association. T Cha is an Orion variable that fluctuates between 10.05 and 14.5.

== Physical characteristics ==
Computer animated scientific space art depicting T Cha

T Cha has a stellar classification of K0e, indicating that it is a K-type star with emission lines in its spectrum. It is currently on the T Tauri stage, accreting matter at a rate of 3.16×10^{−9} to 1.26×10^{−8} M_{☉}/yr. It has 65% the mass of the Sun but the radius is highly uncertain. Estimates range from 0.65 to 4.36 times the radius of the Sun. It radiates 29% the luminosity of the Sun from its photosphere at an effective temperature of 5,111 K, giving it an orange hue. T Cha has a poorly constrained metallicity of [Fe/H] = +0.09 and it spins modestly with a projected rotational velocity of 39 km/s.
