= HD 99015 =

Star in the constellation Chamaeleon

Observation data Epoch J2000.0 Equinox ICRS
- Constellation: Chamaeleon
- Right ascension: 11^{h} 21^{m} 56.89166^{s}
- Declination: −77° 36′ 30.1275″
- Apparent magnitude (V): 6.42±0.01

Characteristics
- Evolutionary stage: main sequence
- Spectral type: A5 V
- U−B color index: +0.11
- B−V color index: +0.20

Astrometry
Radial velocity (R_{v})	−5.9±2.5 km/s
Proper motion (μ)	RA: −79.623 mas/yr Dec.: −8.231 mas/yr
Parallax (π)	13.3992±0.0202 mas
Distance	243.4 ± 0.4 ly (74.6 ± 0.1 pc)
Absolute magnitude (M_{V})	+2.08

Details
Mass	1.87±0.06 M_{☉}
Radius	1.83±0.09 R_{☉}
Luminosity	12.0^{+0.3}_{−0.2} L_{☉}
Surface gravity (log g)	4.2±0.1 cgs
Temperature	7,859±124 K
Metallicity [Fe/H]	+0.15 dex
Age	854 Myr

Other designations
- 31 G. Chamaeleontis, CD−76°495, CPD−76°662, GC 15628, HD 99015, HIP 55497, HR 4397, SAO 256832

Database references
SIMBAD	data

HD 99015, also known as HR 4397 or rarely 31 G. Chamaeleontis, is a solitary white-hued star located in the southern circumpolar constellation Chamaeleon. It has an apparent magnitude of 6.42, placing it near the limit for naked eye visibility even in ideal conditions. The object is located relatively close at a distance of 243 light years and is drifting closer with a somewhat constrained heliocentric radial velocity of −5.9 km/s. At its current distance, HD 99015's brightness is diminished by 0.31 magnitudes due to interstellar dust. It has an absolute magnitude of +2.08.

This is an ordinary A-type main-sequence star with a stellar classification of A5 V. However, Nancy Houk and A. P. Cowley gave a class of A5 III/IV, indicating that it is instead an evolved A-type star with the luminosity class of a subgiant and giant star. It has 1.87 times the mass of the Sun and 1.83 times the solar radius. It radiates 12 times the luminosity of the Sun from its photosphere at an effective temperature of 7,859 K. HD 99015 is somewhat metal enriched ([Fe/H] = +0.15) and is estimated to be 854 million years old.
