= HD 103197 =

Star in the constellation Centaurus

Observation data Epoch J2000.0 Equinox ICRS
- Constellation: Centaurus
- Right ascension: 11^{h} 52^{m} 52.97819^{s}
- Declination: −50° 17′ 34.1616″
- Apparent magnitude (V): 9.40

Characteristics
- Evolutionary stage: main sequence
- Spectral type: K1V(p)
- Apparent magnitude (B): 10.26
- Apparent magnitude (J): 7.916±0.023
- Apparent magnitude (H): 7.600±0.051
- Apparent magnitude (K): 7.426±0.027
- B−V color index: 0.860±0.023

Astrometry
Radial velocity (R_{v})	−4.37±0.14 km/s
Proper motion (μ)	RA: −80.925 mas/yr Dec.: +7.353 mas/yr
Parallax (π)	17.5507±0.0142 mas
Distance	185.8 ± 0.2 ly (56.98 ± 0.05 pc)
Absolute magnitude (M_{V})	5.79

Details
Mass	0.90 M_{☉}
Radius	0.93 R_{☉}
Luminosity	0.54 L_{☉}
Surface gravity (log g)	4.40±0.11 cgs
Temperature	5,303±58 K
Metallicity [Fe/H]	0.21±0.04 dex
Rotation	51±5 d
Rotational velocity (v sin i)	0.602 km/s
Age	4.872±4.294 Gyr

Other designations
- CD−49°6573, HD 103197, HIP 57931, PPM 769972

Database references
SIMBAD	data
Exoplanet Archive	data

HD 103197 is a star with a planetary companion in the southern constellation of Centaurus. It has an apparent visual magnitude of 9.40, which is too faint to be viewed with the naked eye. Based on parallax measurements, HD 103197 is located at a distance of 187 light years from the Sun. It is drifting closer with a radial velocity of −4.6 km/s.

This is a K-type main-sequence star with a stellar classification of K1V(p). In 1978, N. Houk noted that the cores of the star's H and K lines are weakly in emission; hence the 'p' code indicating a spectral peculiarity. The star is an estimated five billion years old with a projected rotational velocity of approximately 0.6 km/s and it appears to be very inactive. It has 90% of the mass and 95% of the radius of the Sun. Its metal content is five-eighths greater than in the Sun.

In 2009, a gas giant exoplanet companion was discovered using the radial velocity method. This object is orbiting the host star at a distance of 0.249 AU (37.2 Gm) and a period of 47.84 d, with what is assumed to be a circular orbit.

The HD 103197 planetary system
Companion (in order from star)	Mass	Semimajor axis (AU)	Orbital period (days)	Eccentricity	Inclination (°)	Radius
b	≥31.2 ± 2.0 M_{🜨}	0.249 ± 0.004	47.84 ± 0.03	0.0(fixed)	—	—

== See also ==
- List of extrasolar planets
