= HD 72922 =

Star in the constellation Chamaleon

- Location of HD 72922 on the map (circled)

Observation data Epoch J2000 Equinox ICRS
- Constellation: Chamaeleon
- Right ascension: 08^{h} 24^{m} 19.8867^{s}
- Declination: −80° 54′ 51.2175″
- Apparent magnitude (V): 5.67

Characteristics
- Evolutionary stage: horizontal branch
- Spectral type: G8 III
- U−B color index: +0.74
- B−V color index: +1.02

Astrometry
Radial velocity (R_{v})	27.5±0.6 km/s
Proper motion (μ)	RA: −149.123 mas/yr Dec.: +226.547 mas/yr
Parallax (π)	11.8882±0.111 mas
Distance	274 ± 3 ly (84.1 ± 0.8 pc)
Absolute magnitude (M_{V})	+1.27

Details
Mass	0.96±0.04 M_{☉}
Radius	9.65±0.17 R_{☉}
Luminosity	41.2±0.9 L_{☉}
Surface gravity (log g)	2.56±0.12 cgs
Temperature	4,708±34 K
Metallicity [Fe/H]	−0.43±0.03 dex
Rotational velocity (v sin i)	<1 km/s

Other designations
- 6 G. Chamaeleontis, CD−80°290, CPD−80°258, FK5 2664, GC 11625, HD 72922, HIP 41191, HR 3393, SAO 258496

Database references
SIMBAD	data

HD 72922, also known as HR 3393, is a suspected astrometric binary located in the southern circumpolar constellation Chamaeleon. A 1993 paper by Olin J. Eggen lists it as a member of the Milky Way's old disk population.

It has an apparent magnitude of 5.67, making it faintly visible to the naked eye under ideal conditions. Based on parallax measurements from the Gaia satellite, the system is estimated to be 274 light years away from the Solar System. However, it is receding with a heliocentric radial velocity of 27.5 km/s. At its current distance, HD 72922's brightness is diminished by magnitudes due to interstellar dust. It has an absolute magnitude of +1.27.

The visible component is an evolved red giant with a stellar classification of G8 III. It is currently on the horizontal branch, fusing helium at its core. It has 96% the mass of the Sun and an enlarged radius of 9.65 R_{☉}. It radiates 41.2 times the luminosity of the Sun from its photosphere at an effective temperature of 4,708 K, giving it a yellowish hue. HD 72922 is metal poor with a metallicity only 37% that of the Sun; it spins too slowly to be measured.
