= HD 93486 =

Algol variable in the constellation Chamaeleon

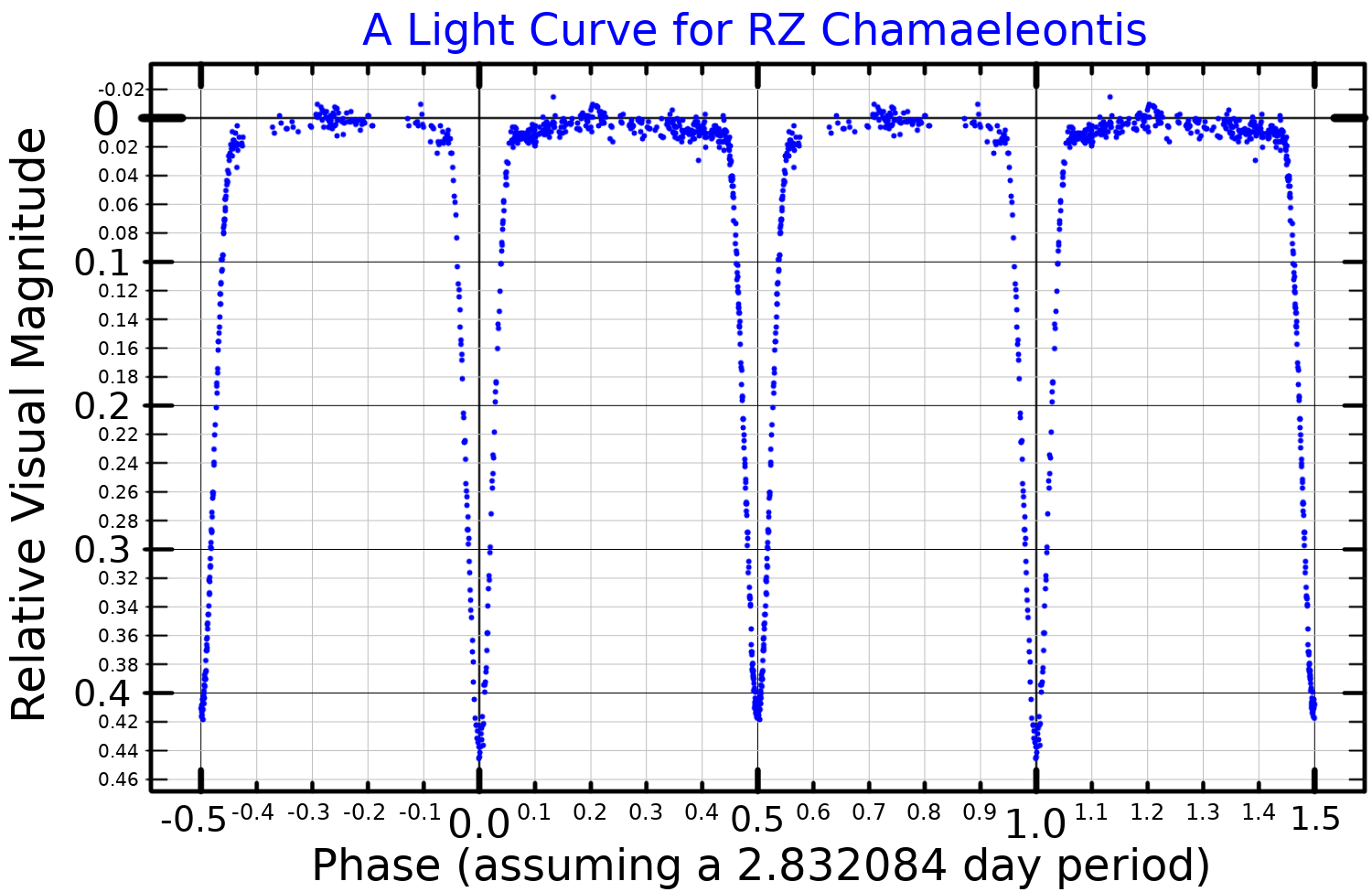
- A visual band light curve for RZ Chamaeleontis, plotted from data published by Jørgensen & Gyldenkerne (1975)

Observation data Epoch J2000.0 Equinox ICRS
- Constellation: Chamaeleon
- Right ascension: 10^{h} 42^{m} 24.10884^{s}
- Declination: −82° 02′ 14.1832″
- Apparent magnitude (V): 8.1 – 8.5

Characteristics
- Spectral type: F5 IV-V + F5 IV-V
- B−V color index: +0.45
- Variable type: Algol

Astrometry
Radial velocity (R_{v})	20±0.6 km/s
Proper motion (μ)	RA: −13.536 mas/yr Dec.: −45.153 mas/yr
Parallax (π)	5.7404±0.0186 mas
Distance	568 ± 2 ly (174.2 ± 0.6 pc)
Absolute magnitude (M_{V})	+1.72 (combined)

Orbit
Primary	RZ Cha A
Name	RZ Cha B
Period (P)	2.8320896±0.0000013 d
Semi-major axis (a)	0.05631 ± 0.00013 AU
Eccentricity (e)	0.00
Inclination (i)	83.292±0.006°
Semi-amplitude (K_{1}) (primary)	107.8±0.4 km/s
Semi-amplitude (K_{2}) (secondary)	108.2±0.4 km/s

Details

RZ Cha A
Mass	1.488±0.011 M_{☉}
Radius	2.1499±0.0058 R_{☉}
Luminosity	7.9 L_{☉}
Surface gravity (log g)	3.9458±0.0018 cgs
Temperature	6,596±150 K
Rotational velocity (v sin i)	38.41±0.10 km/s
Age	2.3 Gyr

RZ Cha B
Mass	1.482±0.011 M_{☉}
Radius	2.2708±0.0058 R_{☉}
Luminosity	8.6 L_{☉}
Surface gravity (log g)	3.8967±0.0017 cgs
Temperature	6,564±150 K
Rotational velocity (v sin i)	40.57±0.10 km/s
Age	2.3 Gyr

Other designations
- RZ Cha, CD−81°391, CPD−81°467, GC 14785, HD 93486, HIP 52381, SAO 258590

Database references
SIMBAD	data

HD 93486, also known as HIP 52381, is a binary star located in the southern circumpolar constellation Chamaeleon near the border with Octans. Its variable star designation is RZ Chamaeleontis (RZ Cha). It has an apparent magnitude ranging from 8.2 to 9.1, which is below the limit for naked eye visibility. Gaia DR3 parallax measurements place the system 568 light years away, and it is currently receding with a heliocentric radial velocity of 20 km/s. At its current distance, HD 93486's average brightness is diminished by 0.53 magnitudes due to interstellar dust. The system has a combined absolute magnitude of +1.72.

In 1964, HD 93486 was discovered to be an eclipsing binary by astronomer W. Strohmeier and colleagues. Four years later, the system was found to be an Algol variable and was given the variable star designation RZ Chamaeleontis in 1974. J. Andersen et al. (1975) calculated a circular orbit of 2.8321 days, which is also its variability period. During this time, RZ Cha drops from photographic magnitude 8.2 to 9.1 when the smaller component is eclipsed, and to 8.8 when the larger one is eclipsed.

Both components have a stellar classification of F5 IV-V, indicating that they are slightly evolved F-type stars with luminosity classes intermediate between a subgiant and a main-sequence star. The primary has 149% the mass of the Sun and 2.15 times the Sun's radius. The secondary has 148% the mass of the Sun and 2.27 times the radius of the Sun. Together, both stars radiate 7.94 times the luminosity of the Sun from their photospheres at an effective temperature of 6,450 K, giving it a combined yellowish-white hue. The system is metal enriched with an iron abundance and is estimated to be 2 to 3 billion years old. Both stars spin modestly, with projected rotational velocities of 38.4 km/s and 40.6 km/s respectively.
