= DR Chamaeleontis =

Binary star in the constellation Chamaeleon

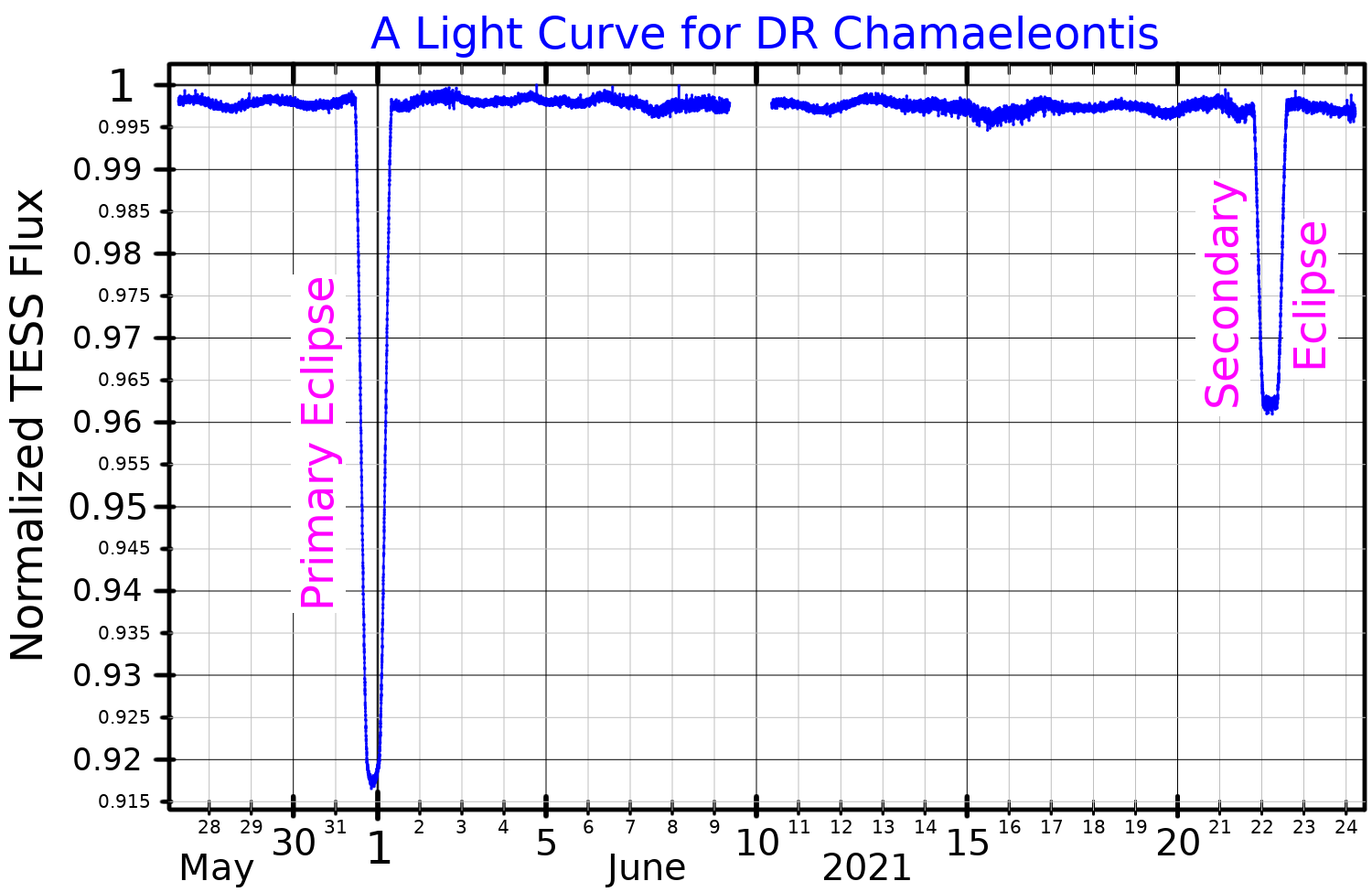
- A light curve for DR Chamaeleontis, plotted from TESS data

Observation data Epoch J2000.0 Equinox ICRS
- Constellation: Chamaeleon
- Right ascension: 10^{h} 41^{m} 51.52042^{s}
- Declination: −79° 46′ 59.8372″
- Apparent magnitude (V): 5.97 (5.97 - 6.06)

Characteristics
- Spectral type: B5 IV or B5 III
- U−B color index: −0.51
- B−V color index: −0.07
- Variable type: Eclipsing binary

Astrometry
Radial velocity (R_{v})	18±10 km/s
Proper motion (μ)	RA: −16.877 mas/yr Dec.: +6.079 mas/yr
Parallax (π)	3.0765±0.0439 mas
Distance	1,060 ± 20 ly (325 ± 5 pc)
Absolute magnitude (M_{V})	−1.28

Details
Mass	6±0.1 M_{☉}
Radius	6.48 R_{☉}
Luminosity (bolometric)	1,587 L_{☉}
Surface gravity (log g)	3.44 cgs
Temperature	12,039±190 K
Metallicity [Fe/H]	+0.08 dex
Rotational velocity (v sin i)	70±7 km/s
Age	50±11 Myr

Other designations
- 24 G. Chamaeleontis, DR Cha, CD−79°439, CPD−79°548, GC 14758, HD 93237, HIP 52340, HR 4206, SAO 256745

Database references
SIMBAD	data

DR Chamaeleontis (DR Cha), also known as HD 93237, is a star located in the southern circumpolar constellation Chamaeleon. The system has an average apparent magnitude of 5.97, allowing it to be faintly visible to the naked eye. DR Cha is located relatively far at a distance of 1,060 light years based on Gaia DR3 parallax measurements, but is receding with a poorly constrained heliocentric radial velocity of 18 km/s.

The visible component has been given several spectral classes over the years. It has been given a luminosity class of a giant star (III), a subgiant (IV), a dwarf star (V), and emission lines. Most sources generally agree that DR Cha is a B5 star. It has 6 times the mass of the Sun and 6.48 times its girth. It shines with a bolometric luminosity 1,587 times that of the Sun from its photosphere at an effective temperature of 12,039 K, giving it a blue hue. The object is estimated to be 50 million years old and spins modestly with a projected rotational velocity of 70 km/s.

In 1982, M. Jaschek listed DR Cha in a catalog of Be stars. The star was discovered to be a variable star when the Hipparcos data was analyzed. It was given its variable star designation, DR Chamaeleontis, in 1999. It has been classified as an Algol-type eclipsing binary, having a period of 19.4436 days. However in 2022, Labadie-Bartz et al. examined the TESS data for this star, and found that the primary and secondary eclipses are separated by "about 20 days", which suggests that the 19.4436 day period published earlier may represent the time interval between primary and secondary eclipse, rather than the full orbital period.
