= HD 86320 =

Binary star in the constellation Chamaeleon

Observation data Epoch J2000.0 Equinox J2000.0 (ICRS)
- Constellation: Chamaeleon
- Right ascension: 09^{h} 51^{m} 00.81459^{s}
- Declination: −80° 03′ 39.7714″
- Apparent magnitude (V): 6.49 (6.69 + 8.62)

Characteristics
- Spectral type: B8 IV
- U−B color index: −0.23
- B−V color index: +0.06

Astrometry
| Radial velocity (R_{v}) | 12.1±2.1 km/s |
| Proper motion (μ) | RA: −7.109 mas/yr Dec.: +8.963 mas/yr |
| Parallax (π) | 3.9544±0.1015 mas |
| Distance | 820 ± 20 ly (253 ± 6 pc) |
| Absolute magnitude (M_{V}) | −0.54 |

Orbit
| Period (P) | 63.52±5.680 yr |
| Semi-major axis (a) | 0.1583±0.0057″ |
| Eccentricity (e) | 0.50 (fixed) |
| Inclination (i) | 34.5±7.0° |
| Longitude of the node (Ω) | 142.3±15.8° |
| Periastron epoch (T) | 2,457,108.1±451.1 JD |
| Argument of periastron (ω) (secondary) | 135.2±20.9° |

Details

A
| Mass | 3.069^{+1.059}_{−1.104} M_{☉} |
| Radius | 4.95±0.25 R_{☉} |
| Luminosity | 332.2^{+16.8}_{−15.5} L_{☉} |
| Surface gravity (log g) | 3.49 cgs |
| Temperature | 10,257±1 K |
| Metallicity [Fe/H] | 0.00 dex |
| Rotational velocity (v sin i) | >250 km/s |
| Age | 346 Myr |

B
| Mass | 1.6 M_{☉} |

Other designations
- 18 G. Chamaeleontis, CPD−79°457, FK5 2791, GC 13624, HD 86320, HIP 48320, SAO 256666, WDS J09510-8004AB

Database references
| SIMBAD | data |

HD 86320 (HIP 48320; 18 G. Chamaeleontis) is a binary star located in the southern circumpolar constellation Chamaeleon. With a combined apparent magnitude of 6.49, the system is a challenge to view with the naked eye, even under ideal conditions. When resolved, the apparent magnitudes of the components are 6.69 and 8.62 respectively. The system is located relatively far at a distance of 820 light years based on Gaia DR3 parallax measurements, and it is drifting away from the Solar System with a heliocentric radial velocity of roughly 12.1 km/s. It has an absolute magnitude of −0.54.

The binary natue of this system was first observed in a 1991 Hipparcos multiple star survey. A preliminary orbit was calculated for the system in 2016. In this solution, the stars take 63.52 years to circle each other in an eccentric orbit at a separation of 0.1583". As of 2021, the 8th magnitude companion is located roughly 0.1" away at a position angle of 344°.

The system has a combined spectral classification of B8 IV, indicating that it is a slightly evolved B-type subgiant that is beginning to cease hydrogen fusion at its core. The primary has 3.07 times the mass of the Sun and 4.95 times the radius of the Sun. It radiates 332.2 times the luminosity of the Sun from its photosphere at an effective temperature of 10,257 K, giving it a bluish-white hue when viewed in the night sky. HD 86320 A has a solar metallicity, and it is estimated to be 346 million years old. It spins rapidly with a projected rotational velocity that is greater than 250 km/s. The companion has 1.6 times the mass of the Sun based on the orbital solution.
