= HD 101917 =

High proper motion star

- Location of HD 101917 on the map (circled)

Observation data Epoch J2000 Equinox J2000
- Constellation: Chamaeleon
- Right ascension: 11^{h} 42^{m} 54.93206^{s}
- Declination: −79° 18′ 23.0075″
- Apparent magnitude (V): 6.38±0.01

Characteristics
- Evolutionary stage: red giant branch
- Spectral type: K0 III/IV
- U−B color index: +0.59
- B−V color index: +0.90

Astrometry
Radial velocity (R_{v})	32.5±0.4 km/s
Proper motion (μ)	RA: +127.152 mas/yr Dec.: −11.599 mas/yr
Parallax (π)	17.64±0.0224 mas
Distance	184.9 ± 0.2 ly (56.69 ± 0.07 pc)
Absolute magnitude (M_{V})	+2.69

Details
Mass	1.26 M_{☉}
Radius	4.01±0.20 R_{☉}
Luminosity	9.04±0.03 L_{☉}
Surface gravity (log g)	3.32±0.06 cgs
Temperature	5,076±19 K
Metallicity [Fe/H]	−0.11±0.02 dex
Rotational velocity (v sin i)	<1.4 km/s
Age	3.87^{+0.41}_{−0.42} Gyr

Other designations
- 34 G. Chamaeleontis, CD−78°476, CPD−78°677, GC 16083, HD 101917, HIP 57137, HR 4509, SAO 256865

Database references
SIMBAD	data

HD 101917, also designated as HR 4509, or rarely 34 G. Chamaeleontis, is a solitary star located in the southern circumpolar constellation Chamaeleon. It has an apparent magnitude of 6.38, placing it near the limit for naked eye visibility. The object is located relatively close at a distance of 185 light years based on Gaia DR3 parallax measurements but is receding with a heliocentric radial velocity of 33 km/s. At its current distance, HD 101917's brightness is diminished by 0.28 magnitudes due to interstellar dust. It has an absolute magnitude of +2.69.

HD 101917 has a stellar classification of K0 III/IV, indicating that it is an evolved K-type star with the blended luminosity class of a subgiant and a giant star. Gaia DR3 models it to be 3.9 billion years old, enough time for it to cool and expand to 4.01 times the radius of the Sun. At present it has 126% the mass of the Sun and now radiates 9.04 times the luminosity of the Sun from its enlarged photosphere at an effective temperature 5,076 K, giving it a yellow hue. HD 101917 has an iron abundance 22% below solar levels, making it slightly metal deficient. It spins slowly with a projected rotational velocity lower than 1.4 km/s.
