= Nu Chamaeleontis =

Star in the constellation Chamaeleon

Observation data Epoch J2000 Equinox ICRS
- Constellation: Chamaeleon
- Right ascension: 09^{h} 46^{m} 20.63010^{s}
- Declination: −76° 46′ 34.0259″
- Apparent magnitude (V): 5.43

Characteristics
- Spectral type: G8III
- U−B color index: +0.57
- B−V color index: +0.89

Astrometry
Radial velocity (R_{v})	11.18±0.14 km/s
Proper motion (μ)	RA: +83.013 mas/yr Dec.: −56.328 mas/yr
Parallax (π)	17.1643±0.048 mas
Distance	190.0 ± 0.5 ly (58.3 ± 0.2 pc)
Absolute magnitude (M_{V})	1.59

Details
Mass	1.64±0.20 M_{☉}
Radius	6.72±0.02 R_{☉}
Luminosity	23.63±0.12 L_{☉}
Surface gravity (log g)	+3.07±0.15 cgs
Temperature	4,985+5 −4 K
Rotational velocity (v sin i)	1.2±1.0 km/s

Other designations
- CPD−76°598, FK5 2784, HD 85396, HIP 47956, HR 3902, SAO 256658

Database references
SIMBAD	data

Nu Chamaeleontis is a single star in the southern circumpolar constellation of Chamaeleon. Its name is a Bayer designation that is Latinized from ν Chamaeleontis, and abbreviated Nu Cha or ν Cha. This is a yellow-hued star, dimly visible to the naked eye, with an apparent visual magnitude of 5.43. It is located at a distance of 190 light-years (58 pc) from the Sun, based on its parallax, and is drifting further away with a radial velocity of +11 km/s. It has an absolute magnitude of 1.59.

This an aging G-type giant star with a stellar classification of G8III. Having exhausted the supply of hydrogen at its core, it has expanded and cooled off the main sequence; at present it has 6.7 times the girth of the Sun. The star has 1.6 times the mass of the Sun and is radiating 24 times the Sun's luminosity from its swollen photosphere at an effective temperature of 4,985 K. These coordinates are a source for X-ray emission, which is most likely (99.3% chance) coming from the star.
