= Pi Chamaeleontis =

Star in the constellation Chamaeleon

π Chamaeleontis
Observation data Epoch J2000 Equinox J2000
- Constellation: Chamaeleon
- Right ascension: 11^{h} 37^{m} 15.642^{s}
- Declination: −75° 53′ 47.520″
- Apparent magnitude (V): 5.64

Characteristics
- Spectral type: A9 IV or F1 III
- U−B color index: −0.01
- B−V color index: +0.35

Astrometry
Radial velocity (R_{v})	−9.8±3.7 km/s
Proper motion (μ)	RA: −129.612 mas/yr Dec.: −3.637 mas/yr
Parallax (π)	22.6009±0.3344 mas
Distance	144 ± 2 ly (44.2 ± 0.7 pc)
Absolute magnitude (M_{V})	2.56

Orbit
Period (P)	223.1845±1.9460 d
Semi-major axis (a)	7.86±0.83 mas
Eccentricity (e)	0.3244±0.1375
Inclination (i)	104.88±5.52°

Details
Mass	1.52 M_{☉}
Radius	2.2 R_{☉}
Luminosity	8 L_{☉}
Surface gravity (log g)	4.08 cgs
Temperature	6,853±80 K
Metallicity [Fe/H]	−0.28 dex
Rotational velocity (v sin i)	50 km/s
Age	1.8±0.1 Gyr

Other designations
- π Cha, CPD−75°744, FK5 438, HD 101132, HIP 56675, HR 4479, SAO 256857

Database references
SIMBAD	data

Pi Chamaeleontis is a binary star system located in the southern circumpolar constellation of Chamaeleon. Its name is a Bayer designation that is Latinized from π Chamaeleontis, and abbreviated Pi Cha or π Cha. This system is dimly visible to the naked eye as a point of light with an apparent visual magnitude of 5.64. Parallax measurements put the system approximately 144 light-years (44.2 pc) away. It is drifting closer with a radial velocity of −10 km/s.

The Hipparcos satellite mission derived a 223 d orbit on the basis of its motion caused by an unseen companion. The visible component is an A-type subgiant or F-type giant star with an effective temperature of about 6,900 K. It has an absolute magnitude of 2.56, a mass of 1.52 M_{☉}, and a radius of 2.2 R_{☉}. It is roughly 1.8 billion years old.
