= HD 94717 =

Distant K-type giant; Chamaeleon

- Location of HD 94717 on the map (circled)

Observation data Epoch J2000.0 Equinox ICRS
- Constellation: Chamaeleon
- Right ascension: 10^{h} 52^{m} 28.63166^{s}
- Declination: −79° 33′ 33.9765″
- Apparent magnitude (V): 6.34±0.01

Characteristics
- Evolutionary stage: red giant branch
- Spectral type: K2 II/III
- U−B color index: +1.57
- B−V color index: +1.46

Astrometry
Radial velocity (R_{v})	3.4±0.5 km/s
Proper motion (μ)	RA: −11.341 mas/yr Dec.: +1.655 mas/yr
Parallax (π)	1.8682±0.021 mas
Distance	1,750 ± 20 ly (535 ± 6 pc)
Absolute magnitude (M_{V})	−2.10

Details
Mass	6.3±0.7 M_{☉}
Radius	77.8±3.9 R_{☉}
Luminosity	1,847^{+46}_{−49} L_{☉}
Surface gravity (log g)	1.47±0.04 cgs
Temperature	4,446±122 K
Metallicity [Fe/H]	−0.01 dex
Rotational velocity (v sin i)	2.4±1.3 km/s
Age	63±20 Myr

Other designations
- 28 G. Chamaeleontis, CD−78°438, CPD−78°589, GC 14988, HD 94717, HIP 53151, HR 4268, SAO 256768

Database references
SIMBAD	data

HD 94717, also known as HR 4268, is a solitary orange hued star located in the southern circumpolar constellation Chamaeleon. It has an apparent magnitude of 6.34, placing it near the limit for naked eye visibility. The object is located relatively far at a distance of 1,750 light years based on Gaia DR3 parallax measurements, but it is receding with a heliocentric radial velocity of 3.4 km/s. At its current distance, HD 94717's brightness is diminished by 0.62 magnitudes due to interstellar dust.

HD 94717 has a stellar classification of K2 II/III, indicating that it is an evolved red giant with the blended luminosity class of a giant star and a bright giant. It is estimated to be 63 million years old, enough time for it to cool and expand to 78 times the Sun's radius. It has 6.3 times the mass of the Sun and radiates 1,847 times the luminosity of the Sun from its photosphere at an effective temperature of 4,446 K. HD 94717 has a solar metallicity and spins modestly with a projected rotational velocity of 2.4 km/s.
