= HD 106248 =

Star in the constellation Chamaeleon

- Location of HD 106248 on the map (circled)

Observation data Epoch J2000.0 Equinox J2000.0 (ICRS)
- Constellation: Chamaeleon
- Right ascension: 12^{h} 13^{m} 56.46291^{s}
- Declination: −78° 34′ 26.1715″
- Apparent magnitude (V): 6.34±0.01

Characteristics
- Spectral type: K2/3 III CNII
- U−B color index: +1.41
- B−V color index: +1.21

Astrometry
Radial velocity (R_{v})	34.5±0.4 km/s
Proper motion (μ)	RA: −4.318 mas/yr Dec.: −20.594 mas/yr
Parallax (π)	9.1183±0.0194 mas
Distance	357.7 ± 0.8 ly (109.7 ± 0.2 pc)
Absolute magnitude (M_{V})	+1.10

Details
Mass	1.19±0.82 M_{☉}
Radius	10.93 R_{☉}
Luminosity	49^{+2.3}_{−2.2} L_{☉}
Surface gravity (log g)	2.42 cgs
Temperature	4,700±122 K
Metallicity [Fe/H]	+0.05 dex
Rotational velocity (v sin i)	<1.5 km/s
Age	4.31^{+0.75}_{−0.48} Gyr

Other designations
- 39 G. Chamaeleontis, CD−77°542, CPD−77°804, GC 16698, HD 106248, HIP 59647, HR 4649, SAO 256915

Database references
SIMBAD	data

HD 106248, also known as HR 4649, is a solitary, orange hued star located in the southern circumpolar constellation Chamaeleon. It has an apparent magnitude of 6.34, placing it near the limit for naked eye visibility. Based on parallax measurements from Gaia DR3, the object is estimated to be 358 light years away from the Solar System. It appears to be receding with a heliocentric radial velocity of 34.5 km/s. At its current distance, HD 106248's brightness is diminished by 0.32 due to interstellar dust and Eggen (1993) lists it as a member of the old (thick) disk population.

This is an evolved red giant with a stellar classification of K2/3 III CNII—intermediate between a K2 and K3 giant star. The CNII suffix indicates that it has a strong overabundance of cyano radicals in its spectrum, making it a CN star. It has 119% the mass of the Sun and is estimated to be 4.31 billion years old, slightly younger than the Sun. However, HD 106248 has already left the main sequence and has an enlarged radius of 10.9 R_{☉}. It radiates 49 times the luminosity of the Sun from its photosphere at an effective temperature of 4,700 K. The star has a solar metallicity and spins slowly with a projected rotational velocity lower than 1.5 km/s.
