= HD 120213 =

Star in the constellation Chamaeleon

Observation data Epoch J2000 Equinox ICRS
- Constellation: Chamaeleon
- Right ascension: 13^{h} 55^{m} 38.8756^{s}
- Declination: −82° 39′ 58.2871″
- Apparent magnitude (V): 5.94

Characteristics
- Spectral type: K2 III: CN−1 CH −2.5
- U−B color index: +1.59
- B−V color index: +1.45

Astrometry
Radial velocity (R_{v})	−35.2±0.6 km/s
Proper motion (μ)	RA: −24.805 mas/yr Dec.: −23.580 mas/yr
Parallax (π)	3.585±0.0375 mas
Distance	910 ± 10 ly (279 ± 3 pc)
Absolute magnitude (M_{V})	−0.98

Details
Mass	4.2^{+1.2}_{−0.7} M_{☉}
Radius	38.6^{+7.5}_{−5.1} R_{☉}
Luminosity	503±13 L_{☉}
Surface gravity (log g)	1.95±0.26 cgs
Temperature	4,401^{+327}_{−376} K
Metallicity [Fe/H]	−0.25±0.10 dex
Rotational velocity (v sin i)	<1 km/s

Other designations
- 50 G. Chamaeleontis, CPD−82°585, GC 18731, HD 120213, HIP 68009, HR 5188, SAO 258683

Database references
SIMBAD	data

HD 120213 (HR 5188) is a solitary star in the southern circumpolar constellation Chamaeleon. It is faintly visible to the naked eye with an apparent magnitude of 5.94 and is estimated to be 910 light years away from the Solar System. However, the object is drifting closer with a heliocentric radial velocity of −35 km/s.

HD 120213 has a stellar classification of K2 III: CN−1 CH −2.5, indicating that its a red giant with an under abundance of CH molecules and cyano radicals in its spectrum. It has also been classified as a mild barium star, but there is uncertainty about the spectral class. It has 4.2 times the mass of the Sun and an enlarged radii of 38.6 R_{☉}. It shines at 503 times the luminosity of the Sun from its photosphere at an effective temperature of 4,401 K, giving it an orange hue. HD 120213 has a metallicity 56% that of the Sun and spins with a projected rotational velocity too low to be accurately measured.
