= HD 103197 b =

Extrasolar planet orbiting HD 103197

Discovery
- Discovered by: Mordasini et al.
- Discovery site: La Silla Observatory
- Discovery date: October 19, 2009
- Detection method: radial velocity (HARPS)

Orbital characteristics
- Semi-major axis: 0.235 AU (35,200,000 km)
- Eccentricity: 0 (fixed)
- Orbital period (sidereal): 47.8 d 0.131 y
- Star: HD 103197

HD 103197 b (also known as HIP 57931 b) is an extrasolar planet which orbits the K-type main sequence star HD 103197, located approximately 170 light years away. It is outside of the habitable zone, and as such is unlikely to have liquid water on its moons, if there are any.
