= HD 76236 =

Star in the constellation Chamaeleon

- Location of HD 76236 on the map (circled)

Observation data Epoch J2000.0 Equinox ICRS
- Constellation: Chamaeleon
- Right ascension: 08^{h} 45^{m} 55.14862^{s}
- Declination: −79° 30′ 15.7456″
- Apparent magnitude (V): 5.77±0.01

Characteristics
- Spectral type: K5 III
- U−B color index: +1.96
- B−V color index: +1.60

Astrometry
Radial velocity (R_{v})	7±0.4 km/s
Proper motion (μ)	RA: −27.042 mas/yr Dec.: +81.026 mas/yr
Parallax (π)	5.3327±0.049 mas
Distance	612 ± 6 ly (188 ± 2 pc)
Absolute magnitude (M_{V})	−0.13

Details
Mass	1.78±0.09 M_{☉}
Radius	53.1±2.7 R_{☉}
Luminosity	950^{+160}_{−60} L_{☉}
Surface gravity (log g)	1.18 cgs
Temperature	3,989±122 K
Metallicity [Fe/H]	+0.27 dex
Rotational velocity (v sin i)	3±1.1 km/s

Other designations
- 11 G. Chamaeleontis, CPD−79°352, GC 12194, HD 76236, HIP 43012, HR 3543, SAO 256552

Database references
SIMBAD	data

HD 76236, also designated as HR 3543 or rarely 11 G. Chamaeleontis, is a solitary star located in the southern circumpolar constellation Chamaeleon. It is faintly visible to the naked eye as an orange-hued star with an apparent magnitude of 5.77. Based on parallax measurements from the Gaia satellite, the object is estimated to be 612 light years away. Currently, it is receding with a heliocentric radial velocity of 7 km/s. At its current distance, HD 76236's brightness is diminished by 0.39 magnitudes due to interstellar dust. It has an absolute magnitude of −0.13.

This is an evolved red giant with a stellar classification K5 III. It has 1.78 times the mass of the Sun and an enlarged radius of 53.1 R_{☉}. It radiates 950 times the luminosity of the Sun from its photosphere at an effective temperature of 3,989 K. HD 76236 has an iron abundance nearly twice of the Sun's, making it metal enriched. It spins modestly with a projected rotational velocity of 3 km/s. An infrared excess has been detected around HD 76236, indicating that the star may have a circumstellar disk.
