= HD 114533 =

Star in the constellation Chamaeleon

- Location of HD 114533 on the map (circled)

Observation data Epoch J2000.0 Equinox J2000.0 (ICRS)
- Constellation: Chamaeleon
- Right ascension: 13^{h} 14^{m} 17.3297^{s}
- Declination: −78° 26′ 50.836″
- Apparent magnitude (V): 5.84±0.01

Characteristics
- Spectral type: G2 Ib
- U−B color index: +0.72
- B−V color index: +1.07

Astrometry
Radial velocity (R_{v})	−17.9±0.3 km/s
Proper motion (μ)	RA: −9.435 mas/yr Dec.: −4.222 mas/yr
Parallax (π)	1.5528±0.0359 mas
Distance	2,100 ± 50 ly (640 ± 10 pc)
Absolute magnitude (M_{V})	−2.0

Details
Mass	3.78 M_{☉}
Radius	77.3±4.0 R_{☉}
Luminosity	2,383±110 L_{☉}
Surface gravity (log g)	1.21 cgs
Temperature	4,514^{+372}_{−274} K
Metallicity [Fe/H]	−0.04^{+0.01}_{−0.00} dex
Rotational velocity (v sin i)	9.2±1 km/s

Other designations
- 44 G. Chamaeleontis, CPD−77°890, FK5 3054, GC 17886, HD 114533, HIP 64587, HR 4976, SAO 257019

Database references
SIMBAD	data

HD 114533, also known as HR 4976, is a solitary star located in the southern circumpolar constellation Chamaeleon. It has an apparent magnitude of 5.84, making it faintly visible to the naked eye. The system is located relatively far at a distance of roughly 2,100 light years based on Gaia DR3 parallax measurements but is drifting closer with a heliocentric radial velocity of −18 km/s. At its current distance, HD 114533A's brightness is diminished by 0.74 magnitudes due to interstellar dust. It has an absolute magnitude of −2.0.

This is an evolved supergiant with a stellar classification of G2 Ib. It has also been given class of F8 Ib, indicating a slightly hotter star. It has 3.78 times the mass of the Sun but has expanded to 77.3 times its girth. HD 114533 radiates over 2,000 times the bolometric luminosity of the Sun from its enlarged photosphere at an effective temperature of 4,514 K, giving it a yellowish-orange hue. The object has a near-solar metallicity and spins modestly with a projected rotational velocity of 9.2 km/s.
