= HD 101782 =

High proper motion star; K-type giant

- Location of HD 101782 (circled)

Observation data Epoch J2000.0 Equinox ICRS
- Constellation: Chamaeleon
- Right ascension: 11^{h} 41^{m} 01.30826^{s}
- Declination: −83° 05′ 59.7773″
- Apparent magnitude (V): 6.33±0.01

Characteristics
- Evolutionary stage: horizontal branch
- Spectral type: K0 III
- U−B color index: +0.88
- B−V color index: +1.08

Astrometry
Radial velocity (R_{v})	11.5±0.4 km/s
Proper motion (μ)	RA: −59.825 mas/yr Dec.: +9.477 mas/yr
Parallax (π)	9.1605±0.0172 mas
Distance	356.0 ± 0.7 ly (109.2 ± 0.2 pc)
Absolute magnitude (M_{V})	+1.11

Details
Mass	2±0.5 M_{☉}
Radius	10.1 R_{☉}
Luminosity	55.25±0.21 L_{☉}
Surface gravity (log g)	2.73 cgs
Temperature	4,663±127 K
Metallicity [Fe/H]	+0.04 dex
Rotational velocity (v sin i)	<1.1 km/s
Age	455 Myr

Other designations
- 33 G. Chamaeleontis, CD−82°224, CPD−82°469, GC 16057, HD 101782, HIP 56996, HR 4507, SAO 258621, WDS J11410-8306A

Database references
SIMBAD	data

HD 101782, also known as HR 4507, is a yellowish-orange hued star located in the southern circumpolar constellation of Chamaeleon. It has an apparent magnitude of 6.33, placing it near the limit for naked eye visibility. Based on parallax measurements from Gaia DR3, the object is estimated to be 356 light years away from the Solar System. It appears to be receding with a heliocentric radial velocity of 11.5 km/s. De Mederios found the radial velocity to be variable, suggesting that it may be a spectroscopic binary. Eggen (1989) lists it as a member of the young disk population.

HD 101782 has a stellar classification of K0 III, indicating that it is an evolved red giant. It is currently on the horizontal branch (HB), fusing helium at its core. The star is located on the cool end of the red clump, a region on the HR diagram with metal-rich HB stars. It has double the mass of the Sun but has expanded to 10.1 times its girth. It radiates 55 times the luminosity of the Sun from its photosphere at an effective temperature of 4,663 K. It has an iron abundance 110% that of the Sun's, placing it at solar metallicity. Like most giants it spins slowly, having a projected rotational velocity lower than 1.1 km/s.

TYC 9507-3649-1 is a 10th magnitude optical companion located 25.9″ away along a position angle of 139°. This companion was first noticed by Sir John Herschel in 1837.
