= HD 98617 =

Double star in the constellation Chamaeleon

- Location of HD 98617 on the map (circled)

Observation data Epoch J2000 Equinox J2000
- Constellation: Chamaeleon
- Right ascension: 11^{h} 18^{m} 34.40370^{s}
- Declination: −79° 40′ 07.1370″
- Apparent magnitude (V): 6.35±0.01

Characteristics
- Evolutionary stage: main sequence
- Spectral type: A8 IIIm:
- U−B color index: +0.08
- B−V color index: +0.26

Astrometry
Radial velocity (R_{v})	−4±2.1 km/s
Proper motion (μ)	RA: +46.293 mas/yr Dec.: −37.910 mas/yr
Parallax (π)	15.7985±0.069 mas
Distance	206.4 ± 0.9 ly (63.3 ± 0.3 pc)
Absolute magnitude (M_{V})	+2.42

Details
Mass	1.75±0.07 M_{☉}
Radius	1.85±0.06 R_{☉}
Luminosity	8.41 L_{☉}
Surface gravity (log g)	4.20±0.04 cgs
Temperature	7,540±276 K
Metallicity [Fe/H]	−0.03 dex
Age	1.06 Gyr

Other designations
- 30 G. Chamaeleontis, CD−78°457, CPD−78°638, FK5 2904, GC 15572, HD 98617, HIP 55225, HR 4385, SAO 256823, WDS J11186-7940AB

Database references
SIMBAD	data

HD 98617, also known HR 4385, is a double star located in the southern circumpolar constellation Chamaeleon. The system has a combined apparent magnitude of 6.35, placing it near the limit for naked eye. The system is located relatively close at a distance of 206 light years but is approaching the Solar System with a fairly constrained radial velocity of −4 km/s. At its current distance, HD 98617 brightness is diminished by 0.29 magnitudes due to interstellar dust.

The system's nature as a double star was first observed in a 1991 Hipparcos multiplicity survey. Their current separation is six-tenths of an arcsecond, making it difficult to measure the properties of the individual components. Nevertheless, the 10th magnitude companion is located along a position angle of 237° as of 2018.

The primary has a stellar classification of A8 IIIm:, indicating that it is an evolved Am star (with uncertainty). However, Renson and Manfroid (2009) lists its chemical peculiarity to be doubtful. It has 1.75 times the mass of the Sun and 1.85 times its girth. It radiates 8.41 times the luminosity of the Sun from its photosphere at an effective temperature of 7,540 K, giving it a white hue. It is estimated to be a billion years old and has a solar metallicity. The aforementioned parameters belong to an A-type main-sequence star instead of a giant star and Gaia DR3 even models it as such.
