= Kappa Chamaeleontis =

Star in the constellation Chamaeleon

Observation data Epoch J2000 Equinox ICRS
- Constellation: Chamaeleon
- Right ascension: 12^{h} 04^{m} 46.471^{s}
- Declination: −76° 31′ 08.62″
- Apparent magnitude (V): 5.024

Characteristics
- Spectral type: K4III
- U−B color index: +1.78
- B−V color index: +1.49

Astrometry
Radial velocity (R_{v})	−2.19±0.19 km/s
Proper motion (μ)	RA: −77.818 mas/yr Dec.: 45.738 mas/yr
Parallax (π)	6.4916±0.0843 mas
Distance	502 ± 7 ly (154 ± 2 pc)
Absolute magnitude (M_{V})	−0.78

Details
Mass	1.4 M_{☉}
Radius	45.2^{+1.7}_{−1.2} R_{☉}
Luminosity	472.0^{+29.5}_{−15.8} L_{☉}
Surface gravity (log g)	0.90^{+0.07}_{−0.02} cgs
Temperature	3,914^{+47}_{−8} K
Rotational velocity (v sin i)	<1.0 km/s

Other designations
- κ Cha, CPD−75°777, HD 104902, HIP 58905, HR 4605, SAO 256899

Database references
SIMBAD	data

Kappa Chamaeleonitis is a single star in the southern constellation of Chamaeleon. Its name is a Bayer designation that is Latinized from κ Chamaeleonitis, and abbreviated Kappa Cha or κ Cha. This object is visible to the naked eye as a dim, orange-hued star with an apparent visual magnitude of 5.024. The distance to this object is approximately 490 light-years, based on the star's parallax. It is drifting closer with a radial velocity of −2 km/s.

This is an aging K-type giant star with a stellar classification of K4III, having exhausted the supply of hydrogen at its core then cooled and expanded to its current size of 45 times the Sun's radius. It is a candidate periodic microvariable, with its brightness fluctuating by 0.005 magnitude at the rate of 0.25664 cycles per day. The star is 1.4 times as massive as the Sun and is radiating 472 times the Sun's luminosity from its enlarged photosphere at an effective temperature of 3,914 K.
