= R Chamaeleontis =

Variable star in the constellation Chamaeleon

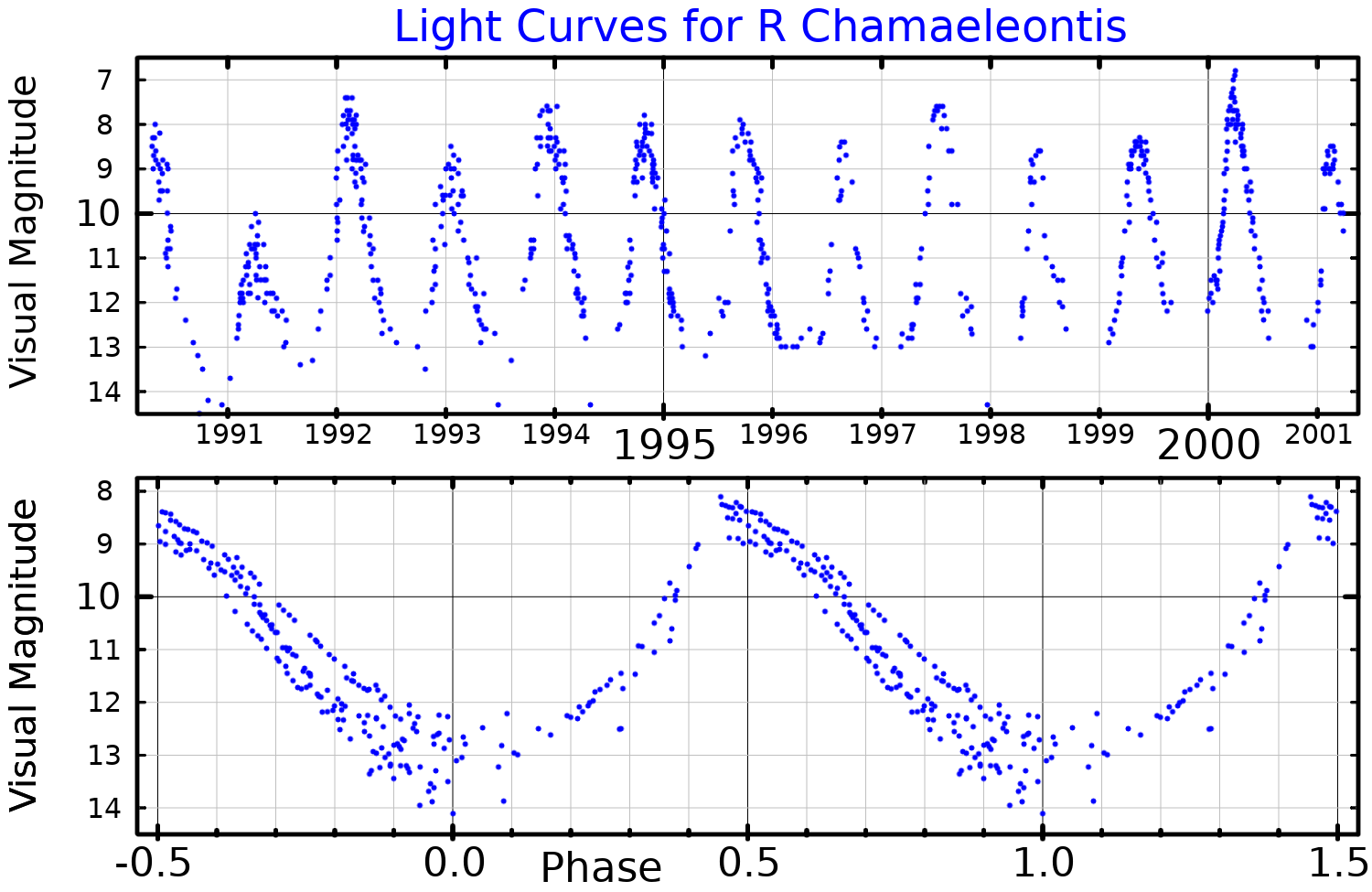
- Visual band light curves for R Chamaeleontis. The upper plot shows AAVSO data, and the lower plot shows ASAS-SN data folded with the star's period of 338 days.

Observation data Epoch J2000.0 Equinox J2000.0 (ICRS)
- Constellation: Chamaeleon
- Right ascension: 08^{h} 21^{m} 46.4589^{s}
- Declination: −76° 21′ 18.302″
- Apparent magnitude (V): 7.5 - 14.1

Characteristics
- Spectral type: M4e-M8e
- Variable type: Mira

Astrometry
Radial velocity (R_{v})	−21.893±6.065 km/s
Proper motion (μ)	RA: −16.420 mas/yr Dec.: +14.578 mas/yr
Parallax (π)	1.102±0.062 mas
Distance	3,000 ± 200 ly (910 ± 50 pc)

Details
Mass	2.5 M_{☉}
Radius	246 – 274 R_{☉}
Luminosity	4,574+1,258 −1,000 L_{☉}
Surface gravity (log g)	−0.27 to −0.35 cgs
Temperature	3,012–3,042 K
Metallicity [Fe/H]	0.00 dex

Other designations
- R Cha, HD 71793, TYC 9394-1962-1, GSC 09394-01962

Database references
SIMBAD	data

R Chamaeleontis (abbreviated to R Cha), also known as HD 71793, is a Mira variable located in the southern circumpolar constellation Chamaeleon. It has an apparent magnitude that ranges from 7.5 to 14.1, which is below the limit for naked eye visibility. Gaia DR3 parallax measurements place it about 3,000 light years away and it is currently approaching with a heliocentric radial velocity of 22 km/s.

This star was first reported to be variable in 1906, it was the first variable star to be discovered in the constellation of Chamaeleon.

R Cha has a stellar classification that has been recorded between M4e near maximum and M8e near minimum. It is an asymptotic giant branch star that has exhausted its core hydrogen and helium and is now fusing hydrogen and helium in separate shells outside its core. It has expanded to about 246 R_{☉} although this varies as it pulsates. It radiates about 4,600 L_{☉} despite its relatively low surface temperature around 3,000 K. The effective temperature also varies as the star pulsates, corresponding to the change in the spectral class.
