= HD 92209 =

Suspected spectroscopic binary

- Location of HD 92209 on the map (circled)

Observation data Epoch J2000.0 Equinox ICRS
- Constellation: Chamaeleon
- Right ascension: 10^{h} 35^{m} 24.7604^{s}
- Declination: −76° 18′ 32.337″
- Apparent magnitude (V): 6.29±0.01

Characteristics
- Spectral type: K2 III
- U−B color index: +1.27
- B−V color index: +1.20

Astrometry
Radial velocity (R_{v})	17.8±2.3 km/s
Proper motion (μ)	RA: −16.952 mas/yr Dec.: +6.489 mas/yr
Parallax (π)	5.4324±0.1144 mas
Distance	600 ± 10 ly (184 ± 4 pc)
Absolute magnitude (M_{V})	+0.53

Details
Mass	1.22 M_{☉}
Radius	14.39 R_{☉}
Luminosity	81.3^{+9.9}_{−8.8} L_{☉}
Surface gravity (log g)	1.76 cgs
Temperature	4,460±90 K
Metallicity [Fe/H]	+0.06 dex
Rotational velocity (v sin i)	<1 km/s

Other designations
- 22 G. Chamaeleontis, CPD−75°678, FK5 2847, GC 14595, HD 92209, HIP 51835, HR 4170, SAO 256730

Database references
SIMBAD	data

HD 92209 (HR 4170) is a probable spectroscopic binary in the southern circumpolar constellation Chamaeleon. It has an apparent magnitude of 6.29, placing it near the max naked eye visibility. Parallax measurements place the system at a distance of 600 light years and is currently receding with a heliocentric radial velocity of almost 18 km/s.

The visible component has a stellar classification of K2 III, indicating that it is a red giant. As a consequence, it has expanded to 14.39 times the radius of the Sun. Nevertheless, it has 122% the mass of the Sun and shines with a luminosity of 81.3 L_{☉}, yielding an effective temperature of 4,460 K from its enlarged photosphere, which in turn gives an orange hue. HD 92209 has a metallicity 115% that of the Sun and spins leisurely with a projected rotational velocity lower than 1 km/s.
