= NGC 3195 =

Planetary nebula in the constellation Chamaeleon

Emission nebula
- Planetary nebula
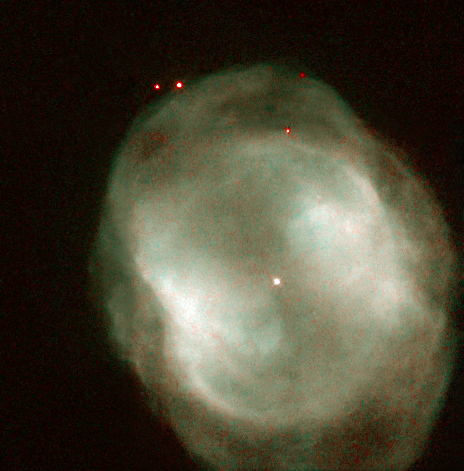
- A Hubble Space Telescope (HST) image of NGC 3195. Credit: HST/NASA/ESA.

Observation data: J2000 epoch
- Right ascension: 10^{h} 09^{m} 20.910^{s}
- Declination: −80° 51′ 30.73″
- Distance: 6,440 ly (1,975 pc) ly
- Apparent magnitude (V): 11.6
- Apparent dimensions (V): 1.33′
- Constellation: Chamaeleon
- Designations: Caldwell 109, Hen 2-44, Sa2-57, PK 296-20.1, PN G296.6-20.0, ESO 19-2

NGC 3195 (also known as Caldwell 109) is a planetary nebula located in the southern constellation of Chamaeleon. Discovered by Sir John Herschel in 1835, this 11.6 apparent magnitude planetary nebula is slightly oval in shape, with dimensions of 40×35 arc seconds, and can be seen visually in telescopic apertures of 10.5 centimetres (4.1 in) at low magnifications.

Spectroscopy reveals that NGC 3195 is approaching Earth at 17 kilometres per second (11 mi/s), while the nebulosity is expanding at around 40 kilometres per second (25 mi/s). The central star is listed as >15.3V or 16.1B magnitude. An analysis of Gaia data suggests that the central star is a binary system. Distance is estimated at 1.7 kpc.
