= HD 80194 =

Star in the constellation of Chamaeleon

Observation data Epoch J2000 Equinox ICRS
- Constellation: Chamaeleon
- Right ascension: 09^{h} 12^{m} 12.3671^{s}
- Declination: −76° 39′ 46.9007″
- Apparent magnitude (V): 6.12±0.01

Characteristics
- Evolutionary stage: Horizontal branch
- Spectral type: K1 III
- U−B color index: +0.99
- B−V color index: +1.09

Astrometry
Radial velocity (R_{v})	0.9±0.4 km/s
Proper motion (μ)	RA: +39.844 mas/yr Dec.: −43.834 mas/yr
Parallax (π)	9.2743±0.02 mas
Distance	351.7 ± 0.8 ly (107.8 ± 0.2 pc)
Absolute magnitude (M_{V})	+0.75

Details
Mass	1.15 M_{☉}
Radius	9.82 R_{☉}
Luminosity	47±2 L_{☉}
Surface gravity (log g)	2.43 cgs
Temperature	4,798±122 K
Metallicity [Fe/H]	−0.09 dex
Rotational velocity (v sin i)	<1 km/s

Other designations
- 12 G. Chamaeleontis, CD−76°416, CPD−76°574, FK5 2735, GC 12766, HD 80194, HIP 45166, HR 3695, SAO 256594

Database references
SIMBAD	data

HD 80194 (HR 3695) is a solitary star in the southern circumpolar constellation Chamaeleon. It has an apparent magnitude of 6.12, allowing it to be faintly seen with the naked eye. Parallax measurements place the object at a distance of 351 light years and is currently receding with a poorly constrained radial velocity of 0.9 km/s.

HD 80194 has a stellar classification of K1 III, indicating that it is a red giant that has exhausted its core hydrogen. It is thought to be a red clump star, on the cool end of the horizontal branch and fusing helium in its core. It has 115% the mass of the Sun but has expanded to 9.82 times its girth. It shines at 47 times the luminosity of the Sun from its photosphere at an effective temperature of 4,798 K, giving it an orange glow. HD 80194 has an iron abundance 81% that of the Sun and spins slowly with a projected rotational velocity lower than 1 km/s.
