= HD 115088 =

Star in the constellation Chamaeleon

Observation data Epoch J2000.0 Equinox J2000.0 (ICRS)
- Constellation: Chamaeleon
- Right ascension: 13^{h} 18^{m} 48.27669^{s}
- Declination: −79° 58′ 33.6643″
- Apparent magnitude (V): 6.33±0.01

Characteristics
- Evolutionary stage: main sequence
- Spectral type: B9.5/A0 V
- U−B color index: −0.21
- B−V color index: −0.05

Astrometry
Proper motion (μ)	RA: −17.937 mas/yr Dec.: −23.120 mas/yr
Parallax (π)	7.9122±0.0305 mas
Distance	412 ± 2 ly (126.4 ± 0.5 pc)
Absolute magnitude (M_{V})	+0.51

Details
Mass	2.85±0.37 M_{☉}
Radius	2.33 R_{☉}
Luminosity	62.49 L_{☉}
Surface gravity (log g)	4.14 cgs
Temperature	10,950±330 K
Age	244^{+57}_{−44} Myr

Other designations
- 45 G. Chamaeleontis, CD−79°519, CPD−79°723, GC 17972, HD 115088, HIP 64951, SAO 257026

Database references
SIMBAD	data

HD 115088, also known as HIP 64951, is a star located in the southern circumpolar constellation Chamaeleon. It has an apparent magnitude of 6.33, placing it near the limit for naked eye visibility. Based on parallax measurements from the Gaia spacecraft, the object is estimated to be 412 light years distant. At that distance, its brightness is diminished by 0.37 magnitudes due to interstellar dust.

HD 115088 has a stellar classification of B9.5/A0 V — intermediate between a B9.5 and A0 main sequence star. It has 2.85 times the mass of the Sun and double the radius of the Sun. It radiates 62.5 times the luminosity of the Sun from its photosphere at an effective temperature of 10,950 K, giving it a bluish-white hue. It is estimated to be 244 million years old, having completed 52.5% of its main sequence lifetime.
