= Iota Chamaeleontis =

Star in the constellation Chamaeleon

- Location of ι Chamaeleontis (circled)

Observation data Epoch J2000 Equinox J2000
- Constellation: Chamaeleon
- Right ascension: 09^{h} 24^{m} 09.224^{s}
- Declination: –80° 47′ 12.758″
- Apparent magnitude (V): 5.34

Characteristics
- Spectral type: F3/5 III/V
- U−B color index: +0.01
- B−V color index: +0.454±0.003

Astrometry
Radial velocity (R_{v})	−3.57±0.66 km/s
Proper motion (μ)	RA: –138.717 mas/yr Dec.: +134.880 mas/yr
Parallax (π)	17.3133±0.0528 mas
Distance	188.4 ± 0.6 ly (57.8 ± 0.2 pc)
Absolute magnitude (M_{V})	+1.52

Details
Mass	1.88 M_{☉}
Radius	3.4 R_{☉}
Luminosity	19.1 L_{☉}
Temperature	6,514 K
Metallicity [Fe/H]	−0.04 dex
Rotational velocity (v sin i)	129.7 km/s
Age	1.2±0.1 Gyr

Other designations
- ι Cha, CD−80°329, FK5 2753, GC 13066, HD 82554, HIP 46107, HR 3795, SAO 258530

Database references
SIMBAD	data

Iota Chamaeleontis is a single star in the southern circumpolar constellation of Chamaeleon. Its name is a Bayer designation that is Latinized from ι Chamaeleontis, and abbreviated Iota Cha or ι Cha. This star is visible to the naked eye as a dim, yellow-white hued point of light, having an apparent magnitude of about 5.3. Based upon parallax measurements, this star is 188.4 light-years (57.8 pc) away from the Sun, but it is drifting closer with a radial velocity of −4 km/s.

Spectra of this star taken in different years have been given types of F3IV/V and F5III, leading to a mean published type of F3/5 III/V, with the suspicion that the spectrum is variable. It is an F-type star, likely an evolving subgiant.

Iota Cha has 1.9 times the mass of the Sun with 3.4 times the Sun's radius. It is 1.2 billion years old with a high rate of spin, showing a projected rotational velocity of 130 km/s. This is giving it an oblate shape with an equatorial bulge some 9% larger than the polar radius. The star is radiating 19.1 times the Sun's luminosity from its photosphere at an effective temperature of 6,514 K. An infrared excess suggests a circumstellar disk of dust is orbiting at a distance of 8.3 AU from the star with a mean temperature of 200 K.
