= Mu1 Chamaeleontis =

Star in the constellation Chamaeleon

μ^{1} Chamaeleontis
Observation data Epoch J2000.0 Equinox ICRS
- Constellation: Chamaeleon
- Right ascension: 10^{h} 00^{m} 43.7937^{s}
- Declination: −82° 12′ 52.812″
- Apparent magnitude (V): 5.53

Characteristics
- Evolutionary stage: main sequence
- Spectral type: A0 IV
- U−B color index: +0.05
- B−V color index: +0.03

Astrometry
Radial velocity (R_{v})	16±10 km/s
Proper motion (μ)	RA: −26.011 mas/yr Dec.: +31.141 mas/yr
Parallax (π)	8.0957±0.0795 mas
Distance	403 ± 4 ly (124 ± 1 pc)
Absolute magnitude (M_{V})	+0.23

Details
Mass	2.6 M_{☉}
Radius	3.66 R_{☉}
Luminosity	90.7 L_{☉}
Surface gravity (log g)	3.73 cgs
Temperature	10,141^{+157}_{−240} K
Metallicity [Fe/H]	−0.18 dex
Rotational velocity (v sin i)	150 km/s

Other designations
- μ^{1} Cha, CPD−81°399, FK5 3980, HD 87971, HIP 49065, HR 3983, SAO 258554

Database references
SIMBAD	data

Mu^{1} Chamaeleontis is a single star in the southern circumpolar constellation of Chamaeleon. Its name is a Bayer designation that is Latinized from μ^{1} Chamaeleontis, and abbreviated Mu^{1} Cha or μ^{1} Cha. This star is dimly visible to the naked eye with an apparent visual magnitude of 5.53. Based upon parallax measurements, it is located approximately 403 light-years (124 pc) away from the Sun. The radial velocity is poorly constrained, but it appears to be drifting further away at the rate of about 16 km/s

This object has a stellar classification of A0 IV, matching an A-type subgiant star. It has 2.6 times the mass of the Sun and an effective temperature of 10,141 K, giving a bluish white glow. Due to its slightly enlarged radius, the star has a luminosity over 90 times that of the Sun. It is spinning rapidly with a projected rotational velocity of 150 km/s. Mu^{1} Chamaeleontis' metallicity – elements more massive than helium – is 66% that of the Sun.
