= Zeta Chamaeleontis =

Variable star in the constellation Chamaeleon

ζ Chamaeleontis
- Location of ζ Chamaeleontis (circled)

Observation data Epoch J2000 Equinox J2000
- Constellation: Chamaeleon
- Right ascension: 09^{h} 33^{m} 53.37537^{s}
- Declination: −80° 56′ 28.5287″
- Apparent magnitude (V): 5.07 (5.06 - 5.17)

Characteristics
- Evolutionary stage: main sequence
- Spectral type: B5V
- Variable type: eclipsing+ELL

Astrometry
Radial velocity (R_{v})	−42.0±4.2 km/s
Proper motion (μ)	RA: −34.582 mas/yr Dec.: +13.564 mas/yr
Parallax (π)	6.0043±0.1134 mas
Distance	540 ± 10 ly (167 ± 3 pc)
Absolute magnitude (M_{V})	−1.15

Details
Mass	3.12 M_{☉}
Radius	4.75 R_{☉}
Luminosity	522 L_{☉}
Surface gravity (log g)	3.55 cgs
Temperature	15,655 K
Metallicity [Fe/H]	−0.31 dex
Rotational velocity (v sin i)	103 km/s
Age	184 Myr

Other designations
- CPD−80°365, HD 83979, HIP 46928, HR 3860, SAO 258538

Database references
SIMBAD	data

Zeta Chamaeleontis is a binary star system located in the constellation Chamaeleon. Its name is a Bayer designation that is Latinized from ζ Chamaeleontis, and abbreviated Zet Cha or ζ Cha. This is a 5th magnitude star, faintly visible to the naked eye under good observing conditions. Based on parallax measurements, it is located around 540 light-years distant.

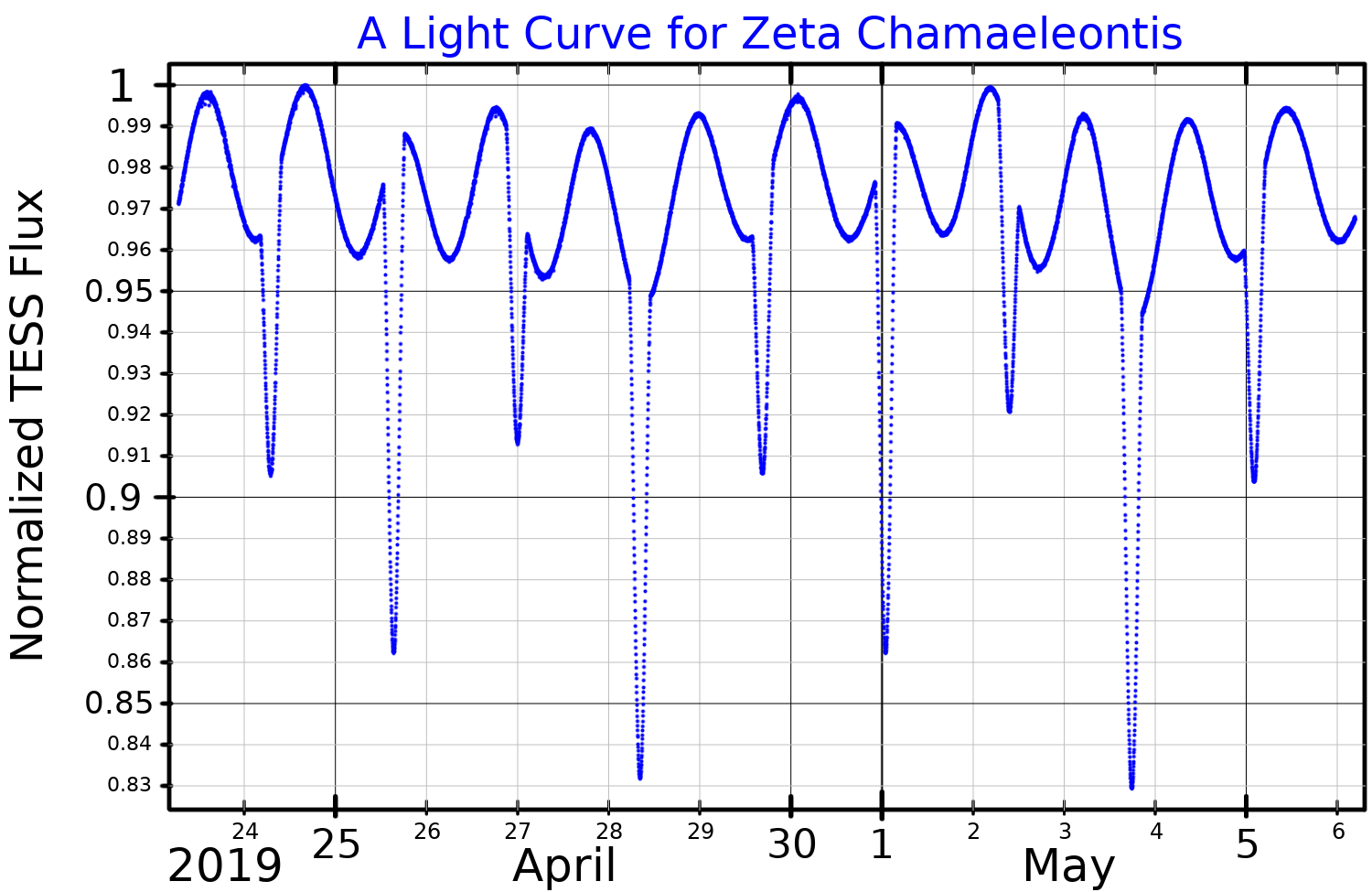
Light curve for Zeta Chamaeleontis, plotted from TESS data

South African Astronomer A.W.J. Cousins noted ζ Cha to vary between magnitudes 5.06 and 5.17 in 1960. It was classified as a Beta Cephei variable in the Hipparcos and Tycho Catalogues (ESA 1997), with a period of 1.07 days, before being reclassified as a slowly pulsating B star in the 2011 version. It is now known to be an eclipsing binary star, with a period of 2.7 days, with continuous variation through the whole cycle due to the ellipsoidal shape of the component stars.

This is classified as a B5V main sequence, an absolute magnitude of −1.15 and a mass of 3.1 solar masses, although the properties are evaluated treating the system as a single star. It shines with a luminosity approximately 522 times that of the Sun and has an effective temperature of 15,655 K.
