= Theta Chamaeleontis =

Star in the constellation Chamaeleon

θ Chamaeleontis
- Location of θ Chamaeleontis (circled in red)

Observation data Epoch J2000 Equinox J2000
- Constellation: Chamaeleon
- Right ascension: 08^{h} 20^{m} 38.539^{s}
- Declination: −77° 29′ 04.125″
- Apparent magnitude (V): 4.34

Characteristics
- Spectral type: K2 IIIb CN0.5
- U−B color index: +1.19
- B−V color index: +1.16

Astrometry
Radial velocity (R_{v})	+21.70±0.7 km/s
Proper motion (μ)	RA: −129.048 mas/yr Dec.: +40.598 mas/yr
Parallax (π)	21.3462±0.1010 mas
Distance	152.8 ± 0.7 ly (46.8 ± 0.2 pc)
Absolute magnitude (M_{V})	+0.97±0.10

Details
Mass	0.94±0.27 M_{☉}
Radius	11.5 R_{☉}
Luminosity	60 L_{☉}
Surface gravity (log g)	2.29±0.29 cgs
Temperature	4,570 K

Other designations
- θ Cha, CPD−77°383, FK5 318, HD 71701, HIP 40888, HR 3340, SAO 256503

Database references
SIMBAD	data

Theta Chamaeleontis is a single, orange-hued star located in the southern constellation of Chamaeleon. Its name is a Bayer designation that is Latinized from θ Chamaeleontis, and abbreviated Theta Cha or θ Cha. This is a dim star but visible to the naked eye with an apparent magnitude of 4.34. Parallax measurements put the star at a distance of 152.8 light-years (46.8 pc). It is moving away from the Sun with a radial velocity of +22 km/s.

Theta Chamaeleontis is an evolved K-type giant star with a stellar classification of K2 IIIb CN0.5, where the suffix notation indicates the outer atmosphere has a mild overabundance of cyanogen. It has 0.94 times the mass of the Sun, and has expanded to 11.5 times as wide. The star is radiating 60 times the Sun's luminosity from its enlarged photosphere at an effective temperature of 4,570 K.

It has a visual companion, Theta Chamaeleontis B. This is a magnitude 12.44 star at an angular separation of 21.1 arcseconds from component A along a position angle of 237°, as of 2000.
