= Delta1 Chamaeleontis =

Star in the constellation Chamaeleon

δ^{1} Chamaeleontis
- Location of δ^{1} Chamaeleontis (circled in red)

Observation data Epoch J2000.0 Equinox J2000.0 (ICRS)
- Constellation: Chamaeleon
- Right ascension: 10^{h} 45^{m} 16.31446^{s}
- Declination: −80° 28′ 10.5409″
- Apparent magnitude (V): 5.47 (6.266 + 6.503)

Characteristics
- Spectral type: K0 III
- U−B color index: +0.74
- B−V color index: +0.95

Astrometry
Radial velocity (R_{v})	+10.7 km/s
Proper motion (μ)	RA: −17.28 mas/yr Dec.: −29.25 mas/yr
Parallax (π)	9.36±0.45 mas
Distance	350 ± 20 ly (107 ± 5 pc)
Absolute magnitude (M_{V})	+0.32

Details
Luminosity	76 L_{☉}
Temperature	5,052 K

Other designations
- δ^{1} Cha, CPD−79°554, HD 93779, HIP 52595, HR 4231, SAO 258592, WDS J10453-8028

Database references
SIMBAD	data

Delta^{1} Chamaeleontis is a close double star located in the constellation Chamaeleon. Its name is a Bayer designation that is Latinized from δ^{1} Chamaeleontis, and abbreviated Delta^{1} Cha or δ^{1} Cha. They have a combined apparent visual magnitude of 5.47, which is just bright enough to be faintly visible to the naked eye as a point of light on a dark rural night. With an annual parallax shift of 9.36 mas, it is located around 350 light-years (110 pc) 350 light years from the Sun.

This pair is one of two stars named Delta Chamaeleontis, the other being the slightly brighter Delta^{2} Chamaeleontis located about 6 arcminutes away. Delta Chamaeleontis forms the southernmost component of the constellation's "dipper" or bowl. Together with Gamma Chamaeleontis, they point to a spot that is within 2° of the south celestial pole.

The two components of Delta^{1} Chamaeleontis have visual magnitudes of 6.3 and 6.5. As of 2000, the pair had an angular separation of 0.783 arcseconds along a position angle of 83.8°. They can be visually separated using a 7.9 in (20 cm) aperture telescope. The pair is a source of X-ray emission with a flux of 27.4×10^{−17} W/m^{2}. The stellar classification of Delta^{1} Chamaeleontis is K0 III, which matches an evolved K-type giant star.
