= Mu2 Chamaeleontis =

Star in the constellation Chamaeleon

μ^{2} Chamaeleontis
Observation data Epoch J2000 Equinox J2000
- Constellation: Chamaeleon
- Right ascension: 10^{h} 04^{m} 07.14960^{s}
- Declination: −81° 33′ 55.7280″
- Apparent magnitude (V): 6.60

Characteristics
- Spectral type: G6/8 III
- U−B color index: +0.53
- B−V color index: +0.919±0.002
- Variable type: Suspected

Astrometry
Radial velocity (R_{v})	+3.30±1.65 km/s
Proper motion (μ)	RA: −47.094 mas/yr Dec.: 49.541 mas/yr
Parallax (π)	5.8632±0.0583 mas
Distance	556 ± 6 ly (171 ± 2 pc)
Absolute magnitude (M_{V})	0.59

Details
Radius	11.35+0.32 −0.16 R_{☉}
Luminosity	70.6±0.9 L_{☉}
Surface gravity (log g)	2.86±0.07 cgs
Temperature	4,967+36 −69 K
Metallicity [Fe/H]	−0.39±0.05 dex
Rotational velocity (v sin i)	3.86±0.46 km/s

Other designations
- NSV 4744, CD−80°365, GC 13909, HD 88351, HIP 49326, HR 3997, SAO 258561

Database references
SIMBAD	data

Mu^{2} Chamaeleontis is a star in the southern constellation of Chamaeleon. Its name is a Bayer designation that is Latinized from μ^{2} Chamaeleontis, and abbreviated Mu^{2} Cha or μ^{2} Cha. This star is not bright enough to be readily visible to the naked eye, having an apparent visual magnitude of 6.60, but has an absolute magnitude of 0.59. The distance to this object is approximately 556 light years, based on the star's parallax. The star's radial velocity is poorly constrained, but it appears to be drifting further away at the rate of around +3 km/s.

This object is an aging G-type giant star with a stellar classification of G6/8 III. Having exhausted the supply of hydrogen at its core, the star has cooled and expanded until now it has 11 times the girth of the Sun. It is a suspected variable star of unknown type. The star is radiating 71 times the luminosity of the Sun from its swollen photosphere at an effective temperature of 4,967 K.
