= Alpha Chamaeleontis =

Star in the constellation Chamaleon

α Chamaeleontis
- Location of α Chamaeleontis (circled)

Observation data Epoch J2000.0 Equinox J2000.0 (ICRS)
- Constellation: Chamaeleon
- Right ascension: 08^{h} 18^{m} 31.552^{s}
- Declination: −76° 55′ 11.01″
- Apparent magnitude (V): 4.06

Characteristics
- Evolutionary stage: main sequence
- Spectral type: F5 V Fe−0.8
- U−B color index: −0.04
- B−V color index: +0.413±0.020

Astrometry
Radial velocity (R_{v})	−13.4±0.5 km/s
Proper motion (μ)	RA: 110.515 mas/yr Dec.: 107.125 mas/yr
Parallax (π)	51.3172±0.0981 mas
Distance	63.6 ± 0.1 ly (19.49 ± 0.04 pc)
Absolute magnitude (M_{V})	+2.59

Details
Mass	1.42 M_{☉}
Radius	2.40+0.05 −0.04 R_{☉}
Luminosity	7.53±0.03 L_{☉}
Surface gravity (log g)	4.28±0.14 cgs
Temperature	5,866+9 −3 K
Metallicity [Fe/H]	−0.26 dex
Rotational velocity (v sin i)	0 km/s
Age	1.8 Gyr

Other designations
- α Cha, Alpha Cha, CPD−76°507, GJ 305, HD 71243, HIP 40702, HR 3318, SAO 256496

Database references
SIMBAD	data

Alpha Chamaeleontis is a solitary star in the southern circumpolar constellation of Chamaeleon. Its name is a Bayer designation that is Latinized from α Chamaeleontis, and abbreviated Alpha Cha or α Cha. This star is bright enough to be seen with the naked eye with an apparent visual magnitude of 4.06. With an annual parallax shift of 51.32 mas, it is located 63.6 light years from the Sun. The star is drifting closer with a radial velocity of −13 km/s, and is predicted to come to within 47 light-years in 666,000 years.

This is an F-type main sequence star with a stellar classification of F5 V Fe−0.8, where the 'Fe−0.8' notation indicates an anomalously low abundance of iron. It has an estimated 1.4 times the mass of the Sun, 2.1 times the Sun's radius, and radiates 7.5 times the solar luminosity from its outer atmosphere at an effective temperature of 6,580 K. The star is around 1.8 billion years old with a projected rotational velocity that is too low to be measured. The star has been examined for an infrared excess that would suggest the presence of an orbiting debris disk, but none was found.
