= Delta2 Chamaeleontis =

Star in the constellation Chamaeleon

δ^{2} Chamaeleontis
- Location of δ^{2} Chamaeleontis (circled in red)

Observation data Epoch J2000.0 Equinox J2000.0 (ICRS)
- Constellation: Chamaeleon
- Right ascension: 10^{h} 45^{m} 47.00487^{s}
- Declination: −80° 32′ 24.6785″
- Apparent magnitude (V): 4.42

Characteristics
- Evolutionary stage: main sequence
- Spectral type: B3 V or B2.5 IV
- U−B color index: −0.728
- B−V color index: −0.192
- Variable type: β Cep+SPB

Astrometry
Radial velocity (R_{v})	+22.6 km/s
Proper motion (μ)	RA: −36.917 mas/yr Dec.: +6.327 mas/yr
Parallax (π)	8.7273±0.1058 mas
Distance	374 ± 5 ly (115 ± 1 pc)
Absolute magnitude (M_{V})	−0.71

Details
Mass	5.0±0.1 M_{☉}
Radius	3.9 R_{☉}
Luminosity	1,072 L_{☉}
Temperature	18,363 K
Rotational velocity (v sin i)	55 km/s
Age	32.6±16.3 Myr

Other designations
- δ^{2} Cha, CPD−79°556, FK5 411, HD 93845, HIP 52633, HR 4234, SAO 258593

Database references
SIMBAD	data

Delta^{2} Chamaeleontis is a solitary star located in the southern circumpolar constellation of Chamaeleon. Its name is a Bayer designation that is Latinized from δ^{2} Chamaeleontis, and abbreviated Delta^{2} Cha or δ^{2} Cha. This star has an apparent visual magnitude of 4.42, which is bright enough it to be viewed with the naked eye. Based upon an annual parallax shift of 8.73 mas, it is located at a distance of around 374 light-years (115 pc) 351 light years from the Sun. The star is drifting further away with a line of sight velocity component of +23 km/s.

This star is one of two systems named Delta Chamaeleontis, the other being the fainter Delta^{1} Chamaeleontis located about 6 arcminutes away. Delta Chamaeleontis forms the southernmost component of the constellation's "dipper" or bowl. Together with Gamma Chamaeleontis, they point to a spot that is within 2° of the south celestial pole.

Delta^{2} Chamaeleontis is a B-type main sequence star with a stellar classification of B3 V. However, Hiltner et al. (1969) give a classification of B2.5 IV, which would suggest it is a more evolved subgiant star. Based on data from the TESS space telescope, it is a pulsating star that displays characteristics of a Beta Cephei variable, a slowly pulsating B-type star, and a rotating variable.

It is estimated to have five times the mass of the Sun and 3.9 times the Sun's radius. With an age of 32.6 million years, it has a high rate of spin, showing a projected rotational velocity of 55 km/s. It is radiating over 1,000 times the solar luminosity from its outer atmosphere at an effective temperature of 18,363 K. There is a 70% likelihood that this star is a member of Gould's Belt.
