= Beta Chamaeleontis =

Star in the constellation Chamaeleon

- Location of β Chamaeleontis (circled in red)

Observation data Epoch J2000.0 Equinox J2000.0 (ICRS)
- Constellation: Chamaeleon
- Right ascension: 12^{h} 18^{m} 20.82459^{s}
- Declination: −79° 18′ 44.0710″
- Apparent magnitude (V): 4.24 (4.24 to 4.30)

Characteristics
- Evolutionary stage: main sequence
- Spectral type: B4 V or B5 IV
- U−B color index: −0.52
- B−V color index: −0.13
- R−I color index: −0.10
- Variable type: SPB

Astrometry
Radial velocity (R_{v})	+23.0 km/s
Proper motion (μ)	RA: −37.97 mas/yr Dec.: +11.15 mas/yr
Parallax (π)	10.93±0.15 mas
Distance	298 ± 4 ly (91 ± 1 pc)
Absolute magnitude (M_{V})	−0.57

Details
Mass	5.0±0.1 M_{☉}
Radius	2.84±0.13 R_{☉}
Luminosity	212 L_{☉}
Surface gravity (log g)	4.03±0.05 cgs
Temperature	14,495±157 K
Rotational velocity (v sin i)	255 km/s
Age	22.7±7.2 Myr

Other designations
- β Cha, CD−78°495, CPD−78°741, FK5 459, GC 16775, HD 106911, HIP 60000, HR 4674, SAO 256924, PPM 371459

Database references
SIMBAD	data

Beta Chamaeleontis is the third-brightest star in the southern constellation of Chamaeleon. Its name is a Bayer designation that is Latinized from β Chamaeleontis, and abbreviated Beta Cha or β Cha. A solitary, suspected variable star, it is visible to the naked eye as a faint blue-white point of light with an apparent visual magnitude that has been measured ranging between 4.24 and 4.30. Parallax measurements yield a distance estimate of 298 light-years (91 pc) from the Sun. It is drifting further away with a radial velocity of +23 km/s.

This is a B-type main-sequence star with a stellar classification of B4 V that is generating energy through core hydrogen fusion. It has been catalogued both as a Be star and a normal star. Based on pulsation measurements made by the TESS space telescope, this is a slowly pulsating B-type variable.

Beta Chamaeleontis is about 23 million years old with a high projected rotational velocity of 255 km/s. The rapid rotation is creating an equatorial bulge that is 12% larger than the polar radius. The star has five times the mass of the Sun and 2.8 times the Sun's radius. It is radiating 212 times the luminosity of the Sun from its photosphere at an effective temperature of 14,495 K.
