= Nancy Houk =

Astronomer, author, research scientist

- Education: University of Michigan 1962, B.S. Case Institute of Technology 1964, M.S. Case Western Reserve University 1967, Ph.D.
- Known for: Atlas of Objective Prism Spectra
- Scientific career
- Fields: Astronomy; astrophysics
- Workplaces: University of Michigan

Nancy Houk (born abt. 1940) is an American astronomer who taught at the University of Michigan and has published numerous books and articles on astronomy. Houk led the decades-long effort to establish a comprehensive database of stellar temperatures and luminosities.

== Education ==
Houk obtained a bachelor of science degree from the University of Michigan where she researched at the Maria Mitchell Observatory, named for America's first woman professional astronomer.

Houk earned her doctorate in astronomy from Case Western Reserve University in 1967. She also carried out postdoctorate studies at Case Western, and the Kapteyn Laboratory in the Netherlands. There, she spent six months collaborating with Dr. Lukas Plaut performing research studies of variable stars.

== Career ==
Houk joined the Astronomy Department of the University of Michigan in 1970 as a research associate. This was followed by promotions to research associate in 1973, associate research scientist in 1977, then research scientist in 1985.

From 1971, Houk led the effort to establish a comprehensive database of stellar temperatures and luminosities. By 2014, the project had assembled five volumes, covering the sky from the south celestial pole to +5° declination, consisting of 162,900 stars in total.

The images taken provide information about the physical properties of stars such as their composition of atomic elements and molecules, mass, temperature, rotational properties, age, distance, spectra classification and more. Houk used this data to construct the fundamental diagram used in astrophysics called the Hertzsprung-Russell Diagram that forms the basis of modern astrophysics.

Houk was the editor of the Michigan Spectral Catalog. Her work was supported by funding from the National Science Foundation.

== Collections ==
Houk retired in 2001 and donated half of her plate collection, which surveyed the entire southern hemisphere night sky, to the Astronomical Photographic Data Archive (APDA) in 2004.

The other half of her collection resides in Japan. APDA, located at the Pisgah Astronomical Research Institute, where there are plans to digitize her photographic plates.

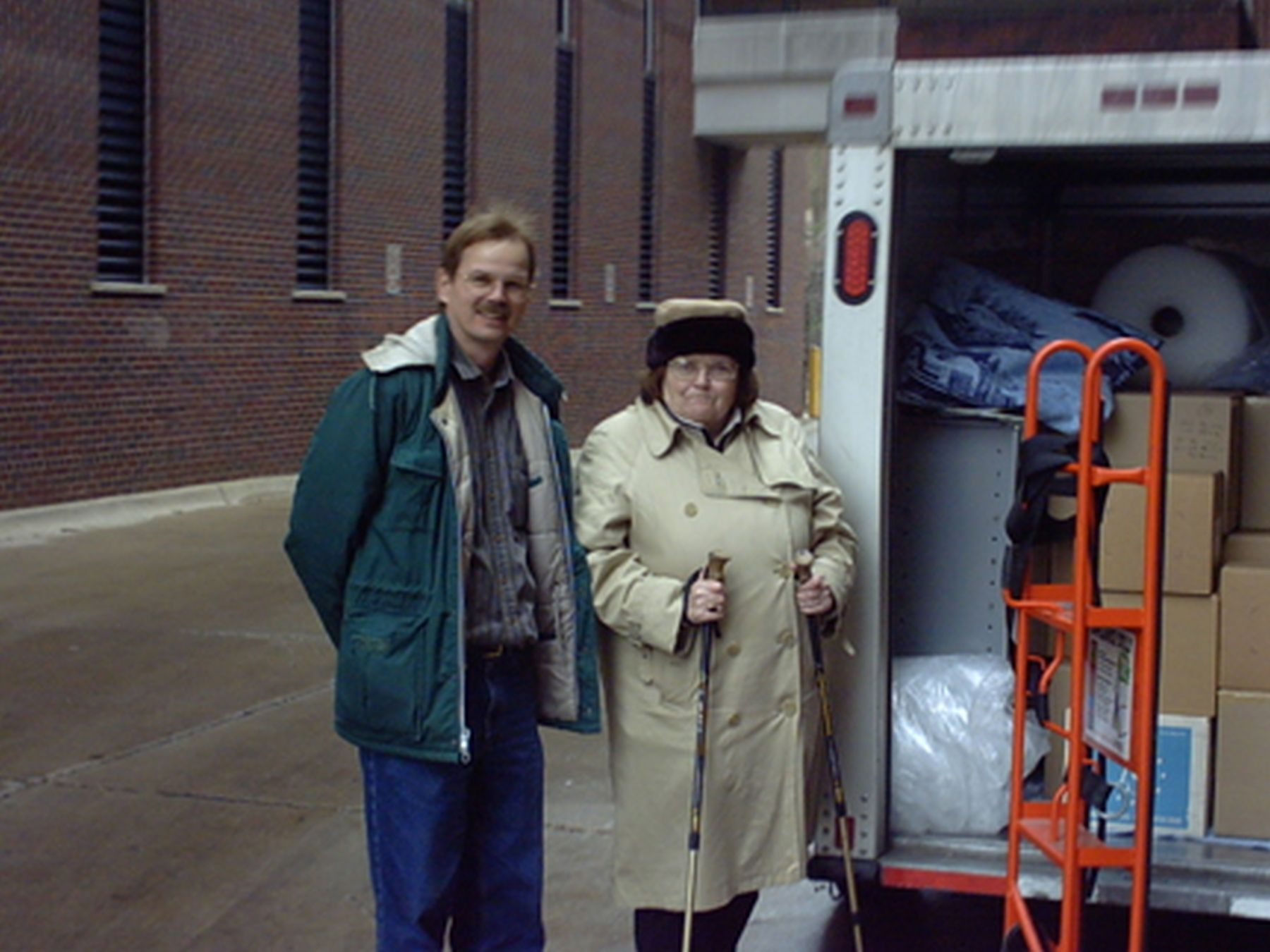
Nancy Houk transferring her collection to APDA. Standing next to her is Michael Castelaz, PARI Research Director in 2004 who accepted Nancy Houk's collection on behalf of APDA.

== Publications ==
Houk's research is published in 5 volumes of the Michigan Spectral Catalog where the first set of HR diagrams are presented from her data.

Publications resulting from her research are listed below:

=== Books ===
- Voigt, H. H., L. Plaut, and N. Houk. Outline of Astronomy. Vols. 1 and 2. Translated from the German edition. Groningen, Netherlands: Noordhoff International Publishing, Academic Book Services, 1974.
- Houk, Nancy, and Michael V. Newberry. A Second Atlas of Objective-Prism Spectra. Ann Arbor: University of Michigan, 1984.

=== Articles ===
- Houk, Nancy, "Spectral Variations of 121 Faint Long-Period Variable Stars" Astronomical Journal 73 (1968): 18.
- Fitzgerald, M. P.; Houk, Nancy, "Spectral Observations, 1965-1968, of the Peculiar Emission Object V1016 Cygni (MH?328-116)" Astrophysical Journal 159 (1970): 963.
- McCuskey, W. W.; Houk, Nancy, "Distribution of B8-A3 Stars near the Galactic Plane. 1. Galactic Longitudes 50' to 150' " Astronomical Journal 76 (1971): 1117.
- Cowley, A. P., and N. Houk. "An Interesting New Southern Peculiar A Star—HD 137509." Publications of the Astronomical Society of the Pacific 87 (1975): 527–528.
- Houk, N.; Hartoog, M. R.; Cowley, A. P., "On stars and supergiants south of declination -53.0" Astronomical Journal 81 (1976): 116
- Cowley, A. P.; Houk, N., The rapidly varying emission spectrum of HD 158503. Publications of the Astronomical Society of the Pacific 88 (1976): 37–40.
- Barbier, M.; Bidelman, W. P.; Dluzhnevskaya, O.; Hauck, B.; Houk, N.; Jaschek, C.; McCarthy, M.; Mead, J.; Nandy, K.; Philip, D., "IAU Commission 45: Working Group on Spectroscopic and Photometric Data. Catalogs recently published, to be published or in preparation. List VII." Bulletin d'Information du Centre de Données Stellaires 13 (1977): 54–58
- Houk, Nancy & Sowell, James & Swift, C.. (2000). The Michigan Spectral Survey of the HD Stars.
- Irvine, N. J.; Houk, N., Spectral changes in the pre-main-sequence star HD 97048. Publications of the Astronomical Society of the Pacific 89 (1977): 347–348.
- Caballero-Nieves, S. M.; Sowell, J. R.; Houk, N. "Galactic Distributions and Statistics of the HD Stars in the Michigan Spectral Catalogue"Astronomical Journal 134 (2007): 1072.
- Sowell, J. R., M. Trippe, S. M. Caballero-Nieves, and N. Houk. "H-R Diagrams Based on the HD Stars in the Michigan Spectral Catalogue and the Hipparcos Catalog." Astronomical Journal 134 (2007): 1089.

=== Catalogs ===
- 1999 Michigan Spectral Survey, Ann Arbor, Dep. Astron., Univ. Michigan, Vol. 5. Houk, N.; Swift, C., Michigan catalogue of two-dimensional spectral types for the HD Stars, Vol. 5
- 1999 "Michigan catalogue of two-dimensional spectral types for the HD Stars; vol. 5. By Nancy Houk and Carrie Swift. Ann Arbor, Michigan : Department of Astronomy, University of Michigan, 1999. ("This is the fifth of a projected seven volumes in a program of systematic reclassification of the Henry Draper stars on the MK system..." (preface).)." Houk, Nancy; Swift, Carrie, Michigan catalogue of two-dimensional spectral types for the HD Stars; vol. 5
- 1975 University of Michigan Catalogue of two-dimensional spectral types for the HD stars. Volume I. Declinations -90 to -53 Degrees., by Houk, N.; Cowley, A. P.. Ann Arbor, MI (USA): Department of Astronomy, University of Michigan, 19 + 452 p. Houk, N.; Cowley, A. P., University of Michigan Catalogue of two-dimensional spectral types for the HD stars. Volume I. Declinations -90 to -53 Degrees.
- 1982 Michigan Catalogue of Two-dimensional Spectral Types for the HD stars. Volume_3. Declinations -40 Degrees to -26 Degrees., by Houk, N.. Ann Arbor, MI(USA): Department of Astronomy, University of Michigan, 12 + 390 p. Houk, N., Michigan Catalogue of Two-dimensional Spectral Types for the HD stars. Volume_3. Declinations -40 Degrees to -26 Degrees.
- 1988 Michigan Catalogue of Two-dimensional Spectral Types for the HD Stars. Volume 4, Declinations -26°.0 to -12°.0.. N. Houk, M. Smith-Moore.Department of Astronomy, University of Michigan, Ann Arbor, MI 48109–1090, USA. 14+505 pp. Price US 25.00 (USA, Canada), US 28.00 (Foreign) (1988). Houk, N.; Smith-Moore, M., Michigan Catalogue of Two-dimensional Spectral Types for the HD Stars. Volume 4, Declinations -26°.0 to -12°.0.

=== Unclear ===
Houk, N., "100,000 MK Types: A Mid-Course Look at the HD Reclassification Project" University of Michigan, Ann Arbor, 1984.
