= Epsilon Chamaeleontis =

Star in the constellation Chamaeleon

ε Chamaeleontis
- Location of ε Cha on the map (circled)

Observation data Epoch J2000.0 Equinox ICRS
- Constellation: Chamaeleon
- A
- Right ascension: 11^{h} 59^{m} 37.58212^{s}
- Declination: −78° 13′ 18.5493″
- Apparent magnitude (V): 5.33±0.01
- B
- Right ascension: 11^{h} 59^{m} 37.51979^{s}
- Declination: −78° 13′ 18.9305″
- Apparent magnitude (V): 6.02±0.01

Characteristics

A
- Spectral type: B9 Vn:
- U−B color index: −0.16
- B−V color index: −0.06

B
- Spectral type: A
- B−V color index: −0.05

Astrometry
Radial velocity (R_{v})	+13±3.7 km/s
Proper motion (μ)	RA: −40.34 mas/yr Dec.: −8.30 mas/yr
Parallax (π)	9.02±0.36 mas
Distance	360 ± 10 ly (111 ± 4 pc)
Absolute magnitude (M_{V})	−0.34

Orbit
Primary	A
Name	B
Period (P)	751 yr
Semi-major axis (a)	1.481″
Eccentricity (e)	0.0
Inclination (i)	83.5°
Longitude of the node (Ω)	181.4°
Periastron epoch (T)	1837.4
Argument of periastron (ω) (secondary)	0°

Orbit
Primary	Aa
Name	Ab
Period (P)	6.43±0.09 yr
Semi-major axis (a)	0.0541±0.0022″
Eccentricity (e)	0.733±0.020
Inclination (i)	111.2±1.8°
Longitude of the node (Ω)	21.1±1.5°
Periastron epoch (T)	2018.57±0.06
Argument of periastron (ω) (secondary)	116.2±2.2°

Details

ε Cha Aa
Mass	2.57 M_{☉}
Age	5+3 −2 Myr

ε Cha Ab
Mass	2.45 M_{☉}
Age	5+3 −2 Myr

ε Cha B
Mass	2.54 M_{☉}
Age	5+3 −2 Myr

Other designations
- ε Cha, 37 G. Chamaeleontis, CPD−77°772, GC 16402, HD 104174, HIP 58484, HR 4583, SAO 256894, CCDM J11596-7813AB, WDS J11596-7813AB

Database references
SIMBAD	data

Epsilon Chamaeleontis is a triple star located in the southern circumpolar constellation Chamaeleon. Its name is a Bayer designation that is Latinized from ε Chamaeleontis, and abbreviated Epsilon Cha or ε Cha. The primary and secondary have apparent magnitudes of 5.33 and 6.02, making them visible to the naked eye. Hipparcos parallax measurements place the system at a distance of 360 light years and is currently receding with a heliocentric radial velocity of 13 km/s.

== Properties ==
The binary nature of this system was first observed during February 1836 when Sir John Herschel found it as the close double star, HJ 4486AB. In 2016, it was discovered that Epsilon Chamaeleontis A it a binary system itself, with components designated Aa and Ab, thus making the system triple. The inner (Aa-Ab) system has an orbital period of 6.43 years and a high eccentricity of 0.643, while the outer (A-B) system has an orbital period of 751 years and a circular orbit.

The system is a member of the Scorpius-Centaurus Association or the smaller portion known as the Lower Centaurus Crux subgroup. The system forms the nucleus of the very young Epsilon Chamaeleontis stellar group, which comprises at least 36 stars. The nebulosity and star formation occurring in this region is currently a very important line of study in the southern hemisphere, whose proximity to the Sun is yielding new astrophysical information. Several papers have been published in the last few years on Lower Centaurus Crux subgroup of stars in the far southern constellations of Musca, Chamaeleon and Octans holding the south celestial pole.
