= Gamma Chamaeleontis =

Star in the constellation Chamaleon

γ Chamaeleontis
- Location of γ Chamaeleontis (circled in red)

Observation data Epoch J2000.0 Equinox J2000.0 (ICRS)
- Constellation: Chamaeleon
- Right ascension: 10^{h} 35^{m} 28.106^{s}
- Declination: −78° 36′ 28.039″
- Apparent magnitude (V): 4.12

Characteristics
- Spectral type: K5 III
- U−B color index: +1.94
- B−V color index: +1.580±0.320

Astrometry
| Radial velocity (R_{v}) | −22.4 km/s |
| Proper motion (μ) | RA: −37.929 mas/yr Dec.: +11.234 mas/yr |
| Parallax (π) | 7.3514±0.1416 mas |
| Distance | 444 ± 9 ly (136 ± 3 pc) |
| Absolute magnitude (M_{V}) | −1.43 |

Details
| Radius | 78+5 −3 R_{☉} |
| Luminosity | 864 L_{☉} |
| Surface gravity (log g) | −0.24±0.12 cgs |
| Temperature | 3,870±39 K |
| Metallicity [Fe/H] | −1.28±0.11 dex |
| Rotational velocity (v sin i) | 9.7±3.7 km/s |

Other designations
- γ Cha, CD−77°454, FK5 401, HD 92305, HIP 51839, HR 4174, SAO 256731

Database references
| SIMBAD | data |

Gamma Chamaeleontis is a solitary star located in the southern circumpolar constellation of Chamaeleon. Its name is a Bayer designation that is Latinized from γ Chamaeleontis, and abbreviated Gamma Cha or γ Cha. This star can faintly be seen with the naked eye on a dark night, having an apparent visual magnitude of 4.12. Based upon an annual parallax shift of 7.35 mas, it is located around 444 light-years (136 pc) from the Sun. This star is drifting closer with a line of sight velocity component of −22 km/s.

This is an evolved K-type giant star with a stellar classification of K5 III. It is a suspected variable star, with an amplitude of 0.01 magnitude. With 78 times the radius of the Sun, this star radiates 864 times the solar luminosity from its enlarged outer atmosphere at an effective temperature of 3,870 K.
