= Chamaeleon =

Constellation in the Southern Sky

- Constellation
- List of stars in Chamaeleon
- Abbreviation: Cha
- Genitive: Chamaeleontis
- Pronunciation: /kəˈmiːliən/ kə-MEE-lee-ən, genitive /kəˌmiːliˈɒntɪs/ kə-MEE-lee-ON-tiss
- Symbolism: the Chameleon
- Right ascension: 07^{h} 26^{m} 36.5075^{s}–13^{h} 56^{m} 26.6661^{s}
- Declination: −75.2899170°–−83.1200714°
- Area: 132 sq. deg. (79th)
- Main stars: 3
- Bayer/Flamsteed stars: 16
- Stars brighter than 3.00^{m}: 0
- Stars within 10.00 pc (32.62 ly): 2
- Brightest star: α Cha (4.05^{m})
- Nearest star: SCR J1138−7721
- Messier objects: 0
- Meteor showers: 0
- Bordering constellations: Musca; Carina; Volans; Mensa; Octans; Apus
- Visible at latitudes between +7° and −90°. Best visible at 21:00 (9 p.m.) during the month of April.

Chamaeleon (/kəˈmiːliən/ kə-MEE-lee-ən) is a small constellation in the deep southern sky. It is named after the chameleon, a kind of lizard. It was first defined in the end of the 16th century.

== History ==
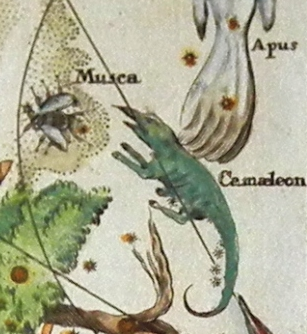
The constellation Camaeleon (Chamaeleon) as depicted in Johann Gabriel Doppelmayr's Atlas Coelestis, ca. 1742.

Chamaeleon was one of twelve constellations created by Petrus Plancius from the observations of Pieter Dirkszoon Keyser and Frederick de Houtman. It first appeared on a 35-cm diameter celestial globe published in 1597 (or 1598) in Amsterdam by Plancius and Jodocus Hondius. Johann Bayer was the first uranographer to put Chamaeleon in a celestial atlas. It was one of many constellations created by European explorers in the 15th and 16th centuries out of unfamiliar Southern Hemisphere stars.

== Features ==
=== Stars ===
Lacaille gave 17 stars Bayer designations Alpha through Pi in 1756, but omitted Omicron and Xi, and labelled two stars as Delta, Mu and Pi. In 1879, Benjamin Gould included Lambda Chamaeleontis and Pi^{2} Chamaeleontis as part of Musca and the designations were no longer used.

There are four bright stars in Chamaeleon that form a compact diamond-shape approximately 10 degrees from the south celestial pole and about 15 degrees south of Acrux, along the axis formed by Acrux and Gamma Crucis. Alpha Chamaeleontis is a white-hued star of magnitude 4.1, 63 light-years from Earth. Beta Chamaeleontis is a blue-white hued star of magnitude 4.2, 271 light-years from Earth. Gamma Chamaeleontis is a red-hued giant star of magnitude 4.1, 413 light-years from Earth. The other bright star in Chamaeleon is Delta Chamaeleontis, a wide double star. The brighter star is Delta^{2} Chamaeleontis, a blue-hued star of magnitude 4.4. Delta^{1} Chamaeleontis, the dimmer component, is an orange-hued giant star of magnitude 5.5. They both lie about 350 light years away.

Chamaeleon is also the location of Cha 110913, a sub-brown dwarf or rogue planet with planets or moons (depending on classification).

=== Deep-sky objects ===
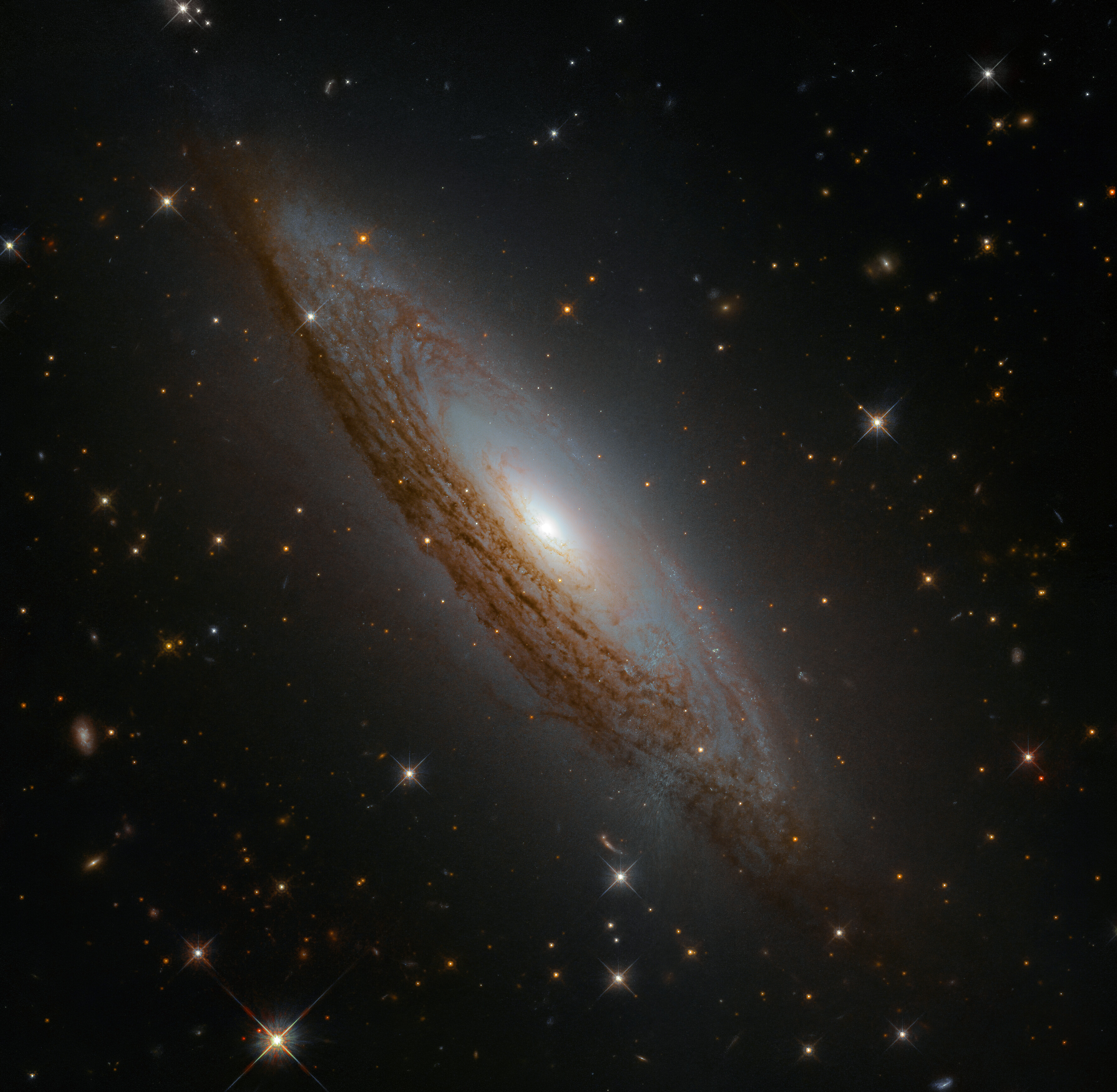
Spiral galaxy ESO 021-G004.

In 1999, a nearby open cluster was discovered centered on the star η Chamaeleontis. The cluster, known as either the Eta Chamaeleontis cluster or Mamajek 1, is 8 million years old, and lies 316 light years from Earth.

The constellation contains a number of molecular clouds (the Chamaeleon dark clouds) that are forming low-mass T Tauri stars. The cloud complex lies some 400 to 600 light years from Earth, and contains tens of thousands of solar masses of gas and dust. The most prominent cluster of T Tauri stars and young B-type stars are in the Chamaeleon I cloud, and are associated with the reflection nebula IC 2631.

In wide-field optical images, the dark clouds of the Chamaeleon complex are visible as prominent obscuring structures spanning much of the constellation's area.

Chamaeleon contains one planetary nebula, NGC 3195, which is fairly faint. It appears in a telescope at about the same apparent size as Jupiter.

== Equivalents ==
In Chinese astronomy, the stars that form Chamaeleon were classified as the Little Dipper (小斗; Xiǎodǒu) among the Southern Asterisms (近南極星區; Jìnnánjíxīngōu) by Xu Guangqi. Chamaeleon is sometimes also called the Frying Pan in Australia.

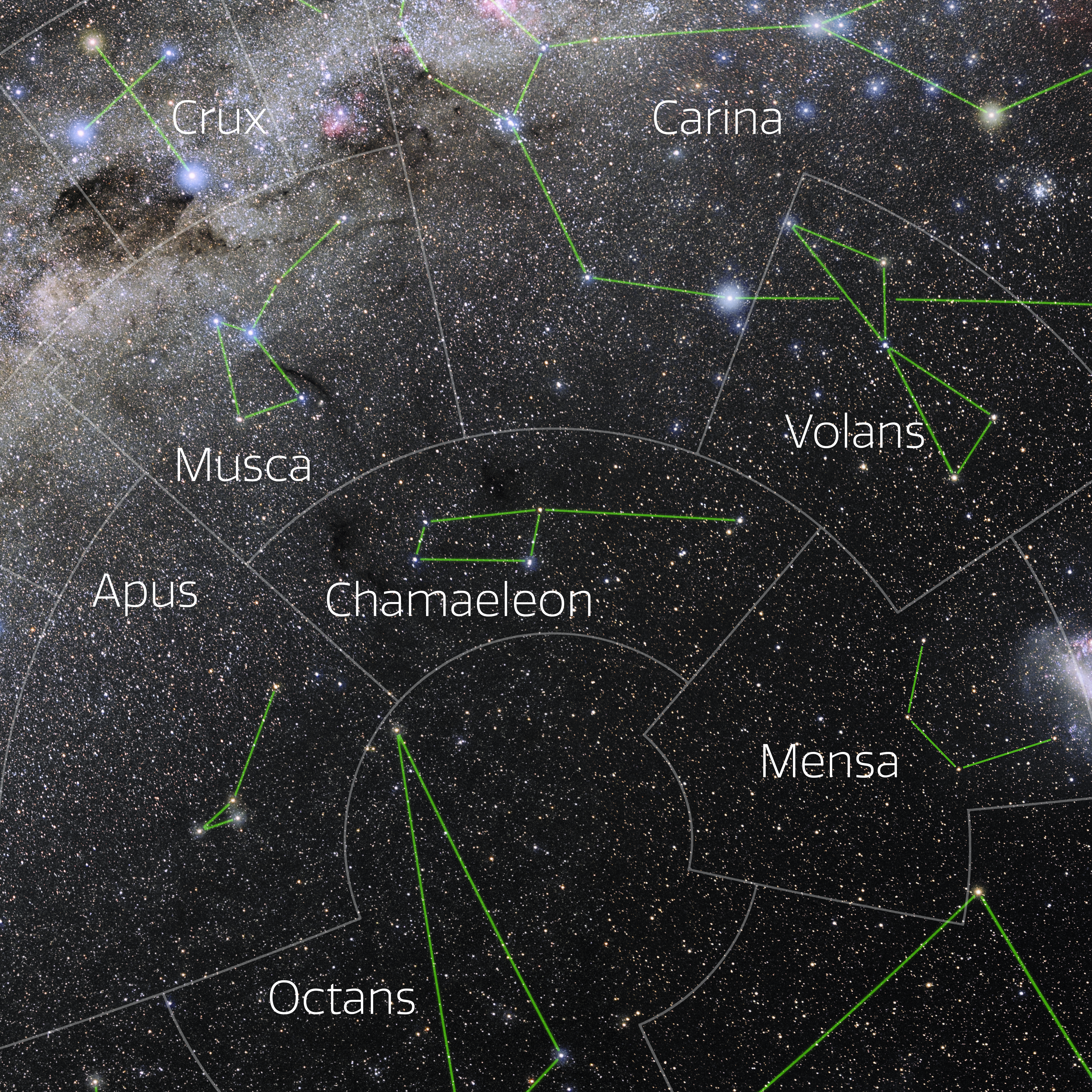
Wide-field astrophotograph of the constellation Chamaeleon with IAU constellation boundaries and stick figure overlaid. The dark patches of the Chamaeleon dark clouds are visible throughout the field.

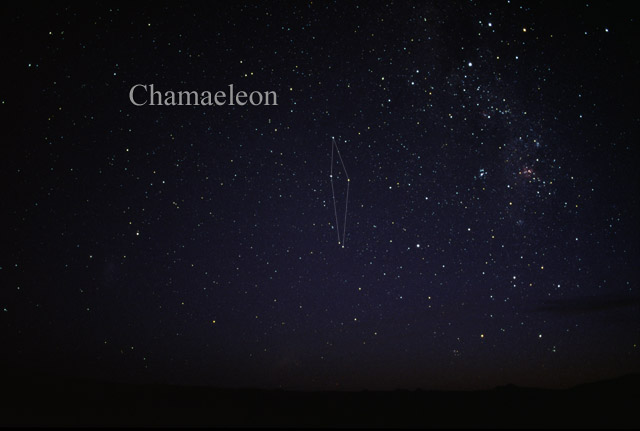
The constellation Chamaeleon as it can be seen by the naked eye.

== See also ==
- Chamaeleon (Chinese astronomy)
- IAU-recognized constellations
