= HR 4887 =

Star in the constellation Crux

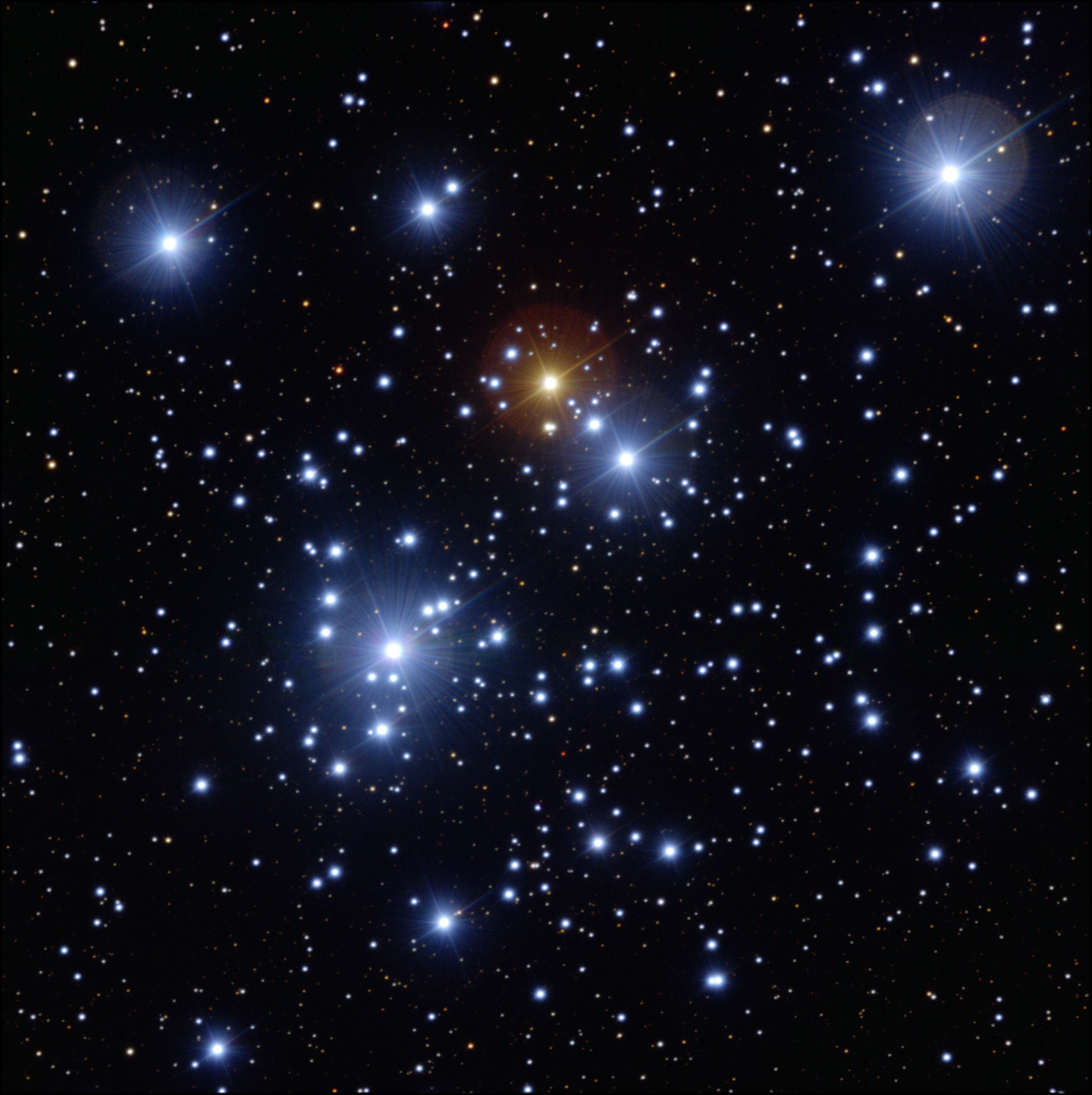
- NGC 4755, with HR 4887 on the right Credit: ESO/Y. Beletsky

Observation data Epoch J2000 Equinox J2000
- Constellation: Crux
- Right ascension: 12^{h} 53^{m} 21.89463^{s}
- Declination: −60° 19′ 46.5630″
- Apparent magnitude (V): 5.77

Characteristics
- Spectral type: B9 Ia
- U−B color index: −0.34
- B−V color index: +0.32
- Variable type: α Cyg?

Astrometry
Radial velocity (R_{v})	−19.00 km/s
Proper motion (μ)	RA: −4.299 mas/yr Dec.: −1.101 mas/yr
Parallax (π)	0.3569±0.0729 mas
Distance	approx. 9,000 ly (approx. 2,800 pc)
Absolute magnitude (M_{V})	−7.00

Details
Mass	18.9 M_{☉}
Radius	69.9 R_{☉}
Luminosity	112,000 L_{☉}
Surface gravity (log g)	2.02 cgs
Temperature	12,680 K
Rotational velocity (v sin i)	70 km/s
Age	8.1 Myr

Other designations
- HR 4887, CD−59°4455, HD 111904, HIP 62894, 2MASS J12532189-6019424, NSV 6008

Database references
SIMBAD	data

HR 4887 (HD 111904) is a suspected variable star in the open cluster NGC 4755, which is also known as the Kappa Crucis Cluster or Jewel Box Cluster.

== Location ==
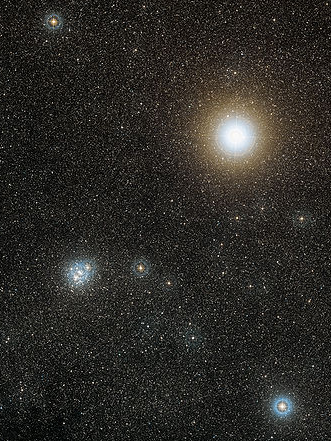
NGC 4755 to the SE of β Crucis (Credit: ESO, ESA/Hubble and Digitized Sky Survey 2. Acknowledgment: Davide De Martin)

HR 4887 is one of the brightest members of the NGC 4775 open cluster, better known as the Jewel Box Cluster. It forms the apex of the prominent letter "A" asterism at the centre of the cluster. The cluster is part of the larger Centaurus OB1 association and lies about 8,500 light years away.

The cluster, and HR 4887 itself, is just to the south-east of β Crucis, the lefthand star of the famous Southern Cross.

== Properties ==
HR 4887 is a B9 bright supergiant (luminosity class Ia). It is over 100,000 times the luminosity of the sun, partly due to its higher temperature over 12,680 K, and partly to being seventy times larger than the sun. The κ Crucis cluster has a calculated age of 11.2 million years, and HR 4887 itself eight million years.

In 1958, HR 4887 was reported to be at visual magnitude 6.80 and on this basis is included in the New Catalogue of Suspected Variable Stars with a range of variation of 5.70 - 6.80. No other observer has measured it far from magnitude 5.75, but measurements of known variable class B stars found that HR 4887 is variable by about a tenth of a magnitude. It is thought likely to be an α Cygni-type variable.
