= BU Crucis =

Star in the constellation Crux

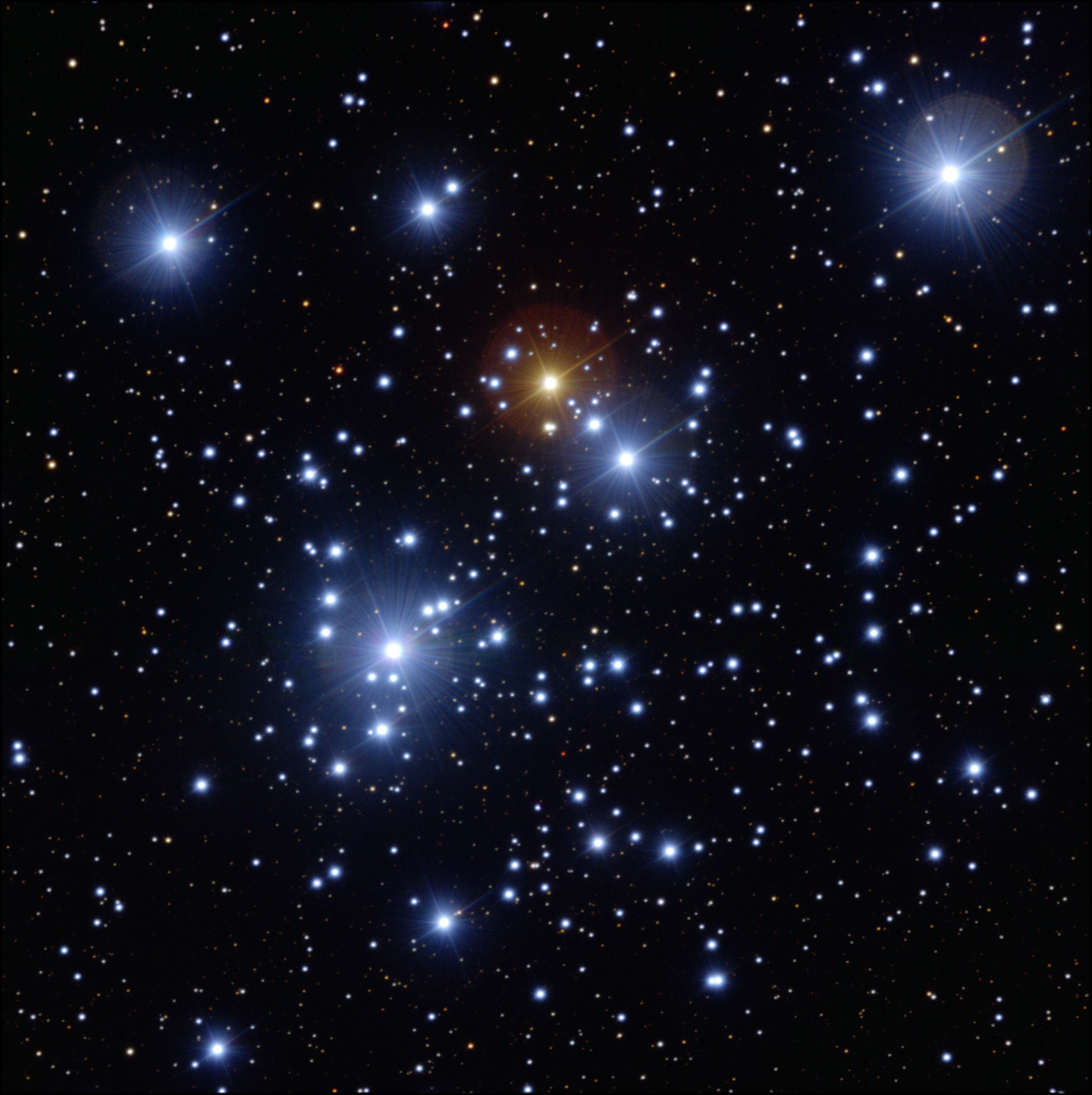
- The star cluster NGC 4755. BU Crucis is the bright blue star just above and to the right of the centre. Credit: ESO/Y. Beletsky

Observation data Epoch J2000 Equinox ICRS
- Constellation: Crux
- Right ascension: 12^{h} 53^{m} 37.62181^{s}
- Declination: −60° 21′ 25.3912″
- Apparent magnitude (V): 6.80 - 6.90

Characteristics
- Spectral type: B2 Ia
- U−B color index: −0.67
- B−V color index: +0.20
- Variable type: Eclipsing?

Astrometry
Radial velocity (R_{v})	−17.00 km/s
Proper motion (μ)	RA: −4.643 mas/yr Dec.: −1.050 mas/yr
Parallax (π)	0.4441±0.0330 mas
Distance	7,300 ± 500 ly (2,300 ± 200 pc)
Absolute magnitude (M_{V})	−7.00

Details
Mass	29.2 M_{☉}
Radius	41.6 R_{☉}
Luminosity	275,000 L_{☉}
Surface gravity (log g)	2.65 cgs
Temperature	20,600 K
Rotational velocity (v sin i)	75 km/s
Age	5.6 Myr

Other designations
- BU Cru, CD−59°4458, HD 111934, HIP 62913, 2MASS J12533761-6021254

Database references
SIMBAD	data

BU Crucis (HD 111934) is a variable star in the open cluster NGC 4755, which is also known as the Kappa Crucis Cluster or Jewel Box Cluster.

== Location ==
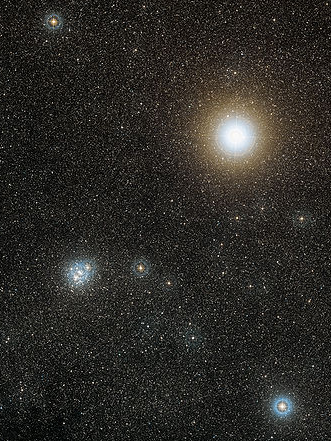
NGC 4755 to the SE of β Crucis (Credit: ESO, ESA/Hubble and Digitized Sky Survey 2. Acknowledgment: Davide De Martin)

BU Cru is one of the brightest members of the NGC 4775 open cluster, better known as the Jewel Box Cluster. It forms the right end of the bar of the prominent letter "A" asterism at the centre of the cluster. The cluster is part of the larger Centaurus OB1 association and lies about 8,500 light years away.

The cluster, and BU Crucis itself, is just to the south-east of β Crucis, the lefthand star of the famous Southern Cross.

== Properties ==
BU Crucis is a B2 bright supergiant (luminosity class Ia). It is 275,000 times the luminosity of the sun, partly due to its higher temperature over 20,000 K, and partly to being forty times larger than the sun. The κ Crucis cluster has a calculated age of 11.2 million years, and BU Crucis itself around five million years.

== Variability ==
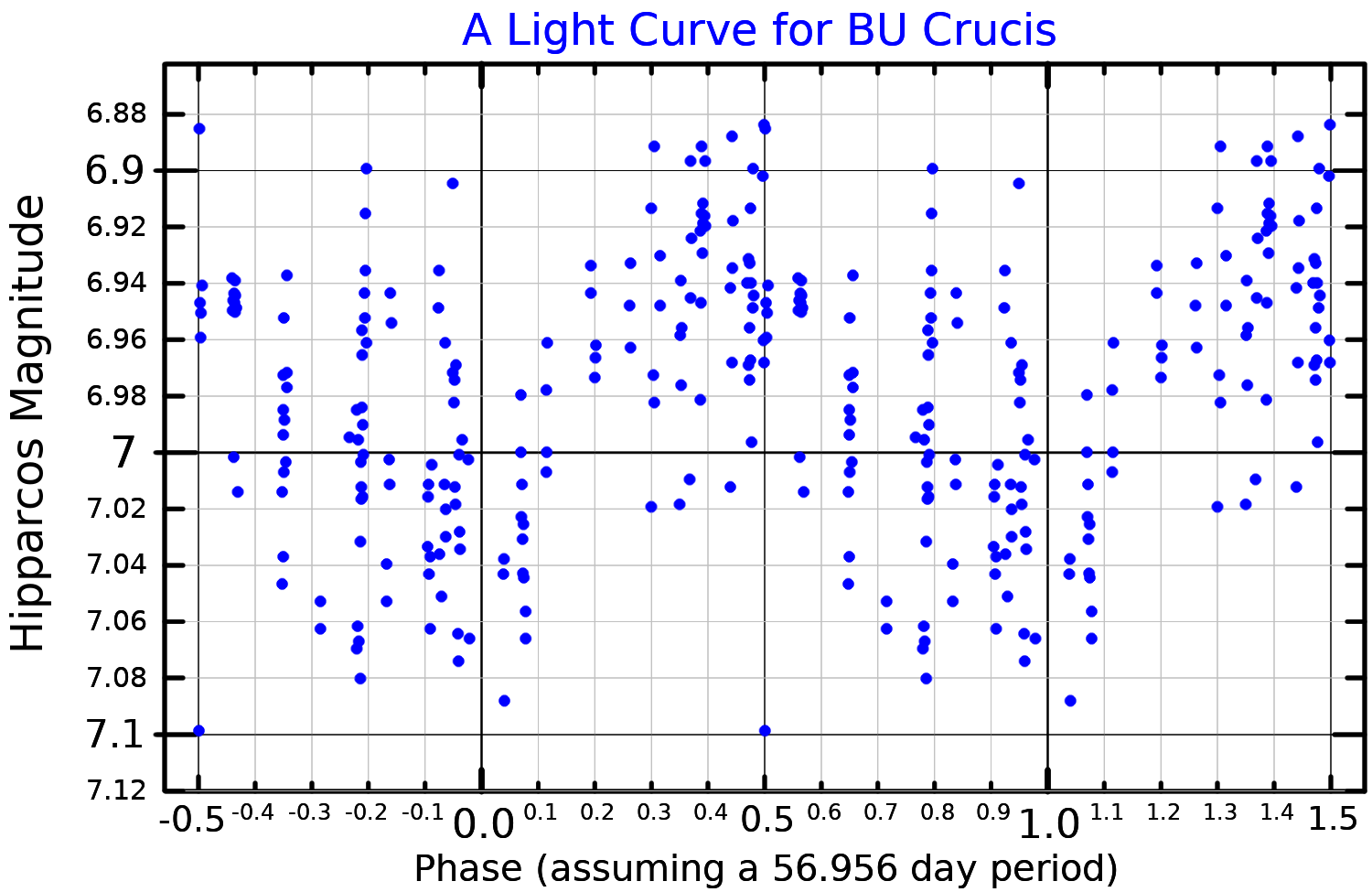
A light curve for BU Crucis, adapted from Lefèvre et al. (2009)

BU Crucis is a variable star with a brightness range of about 0.1 magnitudes. It is listed as a probable eclipsing binary in the General Catalogue of Variable Stars, but the International Variable Star Index classifies it as an α Cygni variable with a visual magnitude range of 6.82 - 7.01.
