= Kappa Crucis =

Kappa Crucis (κ Cru) can refer to:

- Kappa Crucis Cluster; NGC 4755, an open cluster in the constellation of Crux, also known as the "Jewel Box". It was formerly called as simply "Kappa Crucis".
- Kappa Crucis (star); a primary member of Kappa Crucis Cluster.
