= DS Crucis =

Star in the constellation Crux

- Location of DS Crucis (circled)

Observation data Epoch J2000 Equinox J2000
- Constellation: Crux
- Right ascension: 12^{h} 51^{m} 17.97637^{s}
- Declination: −60° 19′ 47.2386″
- Apparent magnitude (V): 5.741

Characteristics
- Spectral type: A1 Ia
- U−B color index: −0.088
- B−V color index: +0.384
- Variable type: α Cyg?

Astrometry
Radial velocity (R_{v})	−21.90 km/s
Proper motion (μ)	RA: −4.63±0.02 mas/yr Dec.: −0.94±0.03 mas/yr
Parallax (π)	0.4534±0.0296 mas
Distance	7,200 ± 500 ly (2,200 ± 100 pc)
Absolute magnitude (M_{V})	−7.29

Details
Mass	29 M_{☉}
Radius	112 R_{☉}
Luminosity	79,400 L_{☉}
Surface gravity (log g)	1.45 cgs
Temperature	9,150 K
Metallicity [Fe/H]	−0.11 dex
Rotational velocity (v sin i)	17 km/s
Age	7 Myr

Other designations
- DS Cru, HR 4876, CD−59°4432, HD 111613, HIP 62732, 2MASS J12511794-6019473

Database references
SIMBAD	data

DS Crucis (HR 4876, HD 111613) is a variable star near the open cluster NGC 4755, which is also known as the Kappa Crucis Cluster or Jewel Box Cluster. It is in the constellation Crux.

== Location ==
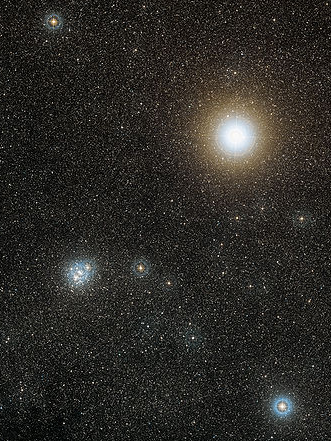
NGC 4755 to the SE of β Crucis. DS Crucis is the bright star to the right of NGC 4755. (Credit: ESO, ESA/Hubble and Digitized Sky Survey 2. Acknowledgment: Davide De Martin)

DS Crucis is one of the brightest stars in the region of the NGC 4775 open cluster, better known as the Jewel Box Cluster, but its membership of the cluster is in doubt. The cluster is part of the larger Centaurus OB1 association and lies about 8,500 light years away.

DS Crucis and NGC 4755 lie just to the south-east of β Crucis, the lefthand star of the famous Southern Cross.

== Variability ==
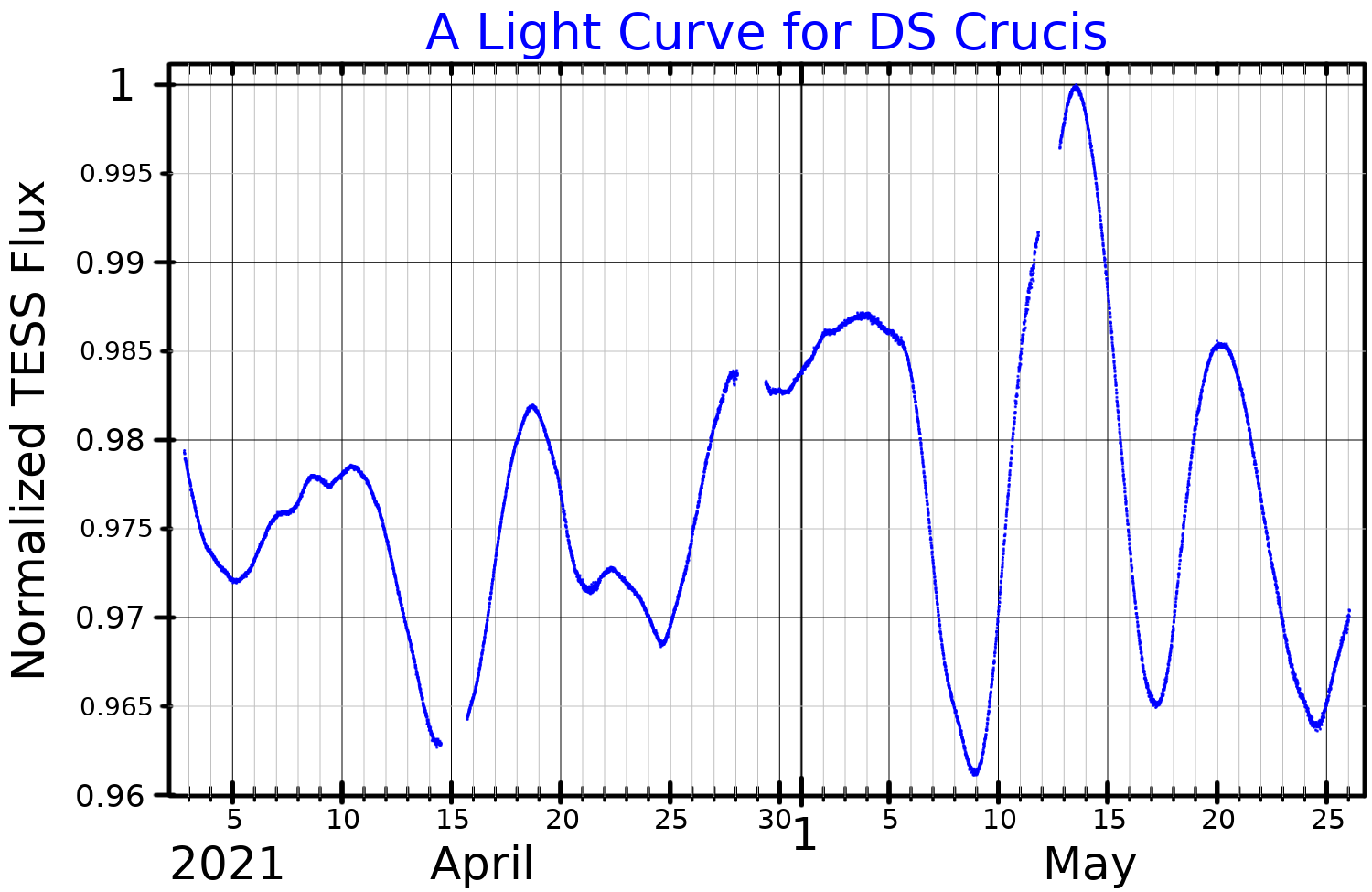
A light curve for DS Crucis, plotted from TESS data

DS Crucis is a variable star with an amplitude of about 0.05 magnitudes. It was found to be variable from the photometry performed by the Hipparcos satellite. The variability type is unclear but it is assumed to be an α Cygni variable.

== Properties ==
DS Crucis is an A1 bright supergiant (luminosity class Ia), although it has also been classified as A2 Iabe. It is nearly 80,000 times the luminosity of the sun, partly due to its higher temperature of 9,000 K, and partly to being over a hundred times larger than the sun. The κ Crucis cluster has a calculated age of 11.2 million years, and DS Crucis an age of seven million years.
