= P Carinae =

The Bayer designations p Carinae and P Carinae are distinct.

- for p Carinae, see PP Carinae
- for P Carinae, see V399 Carinae
