= DU Crucis =

Star in the constellation Crux

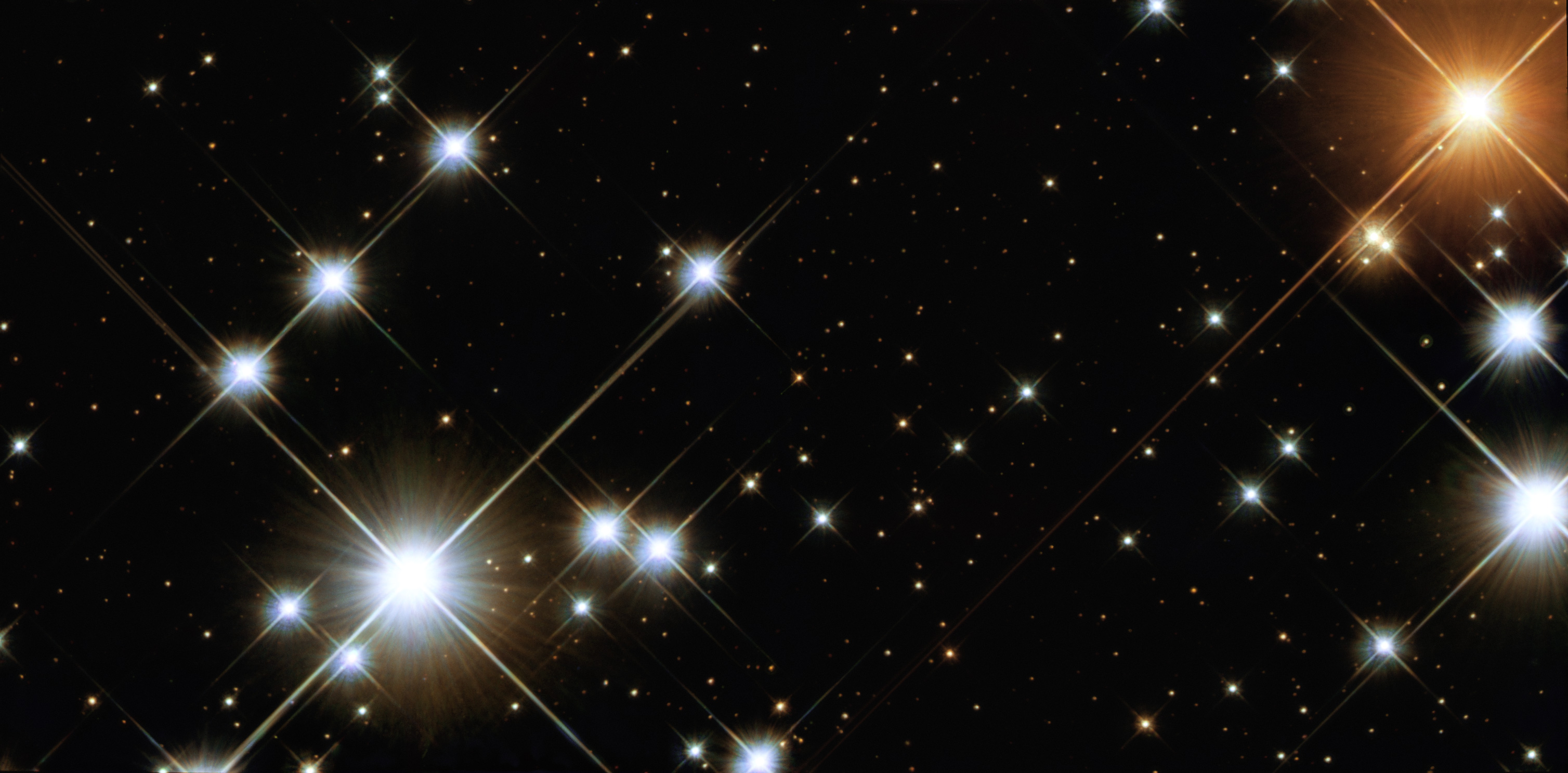
- The centre of NGC 4755, with DU Cru at top right Credit: NASA/ESA and Jesús Maíz Apellániz (Instituto de Astrofísica de Andalucía, Spain)

Observation data Epoch J2000 Equinox ICRS
- Constellation: Crux
- Right ascension: 12^{h} 53^{m} 41.33485^{s}
- Declination: −60° 20′ 57.9647″
- Apparent magnitude (V): 7.45

Characteristics
- Spectral type: M2- Iab
- U−B color index: +2.57
- B−V color index: +2.22
- Variable type: Lc

Astrometry
Radial velocity (R_{v})	−21.24 km/s
Proper motion (μ)	RA: −4.703 mas/yr Dec.: −1.162 mas/yr
Parallax (π)	0.5075±0.0516 mas
Distance	2,600 pc
Absolute magnitude (M_{V})	−5.52

Details
Radius	664 R_{☉}
Luminosity	69,600 L_{☉}
Temperature	3,467 K

Other designations
- DU Cru, CD−59°4459, HIP 62918, SAO 252073, 2MASS J12534132−6020578, IRAS 12506−6004

Database references
SIMBAD	data

DU Crucis is a red supergiant and slow irregular variable star in the constellation Crux and a prominent member of the Jewel Box (NGC 4755) open cluster.

== Location ==
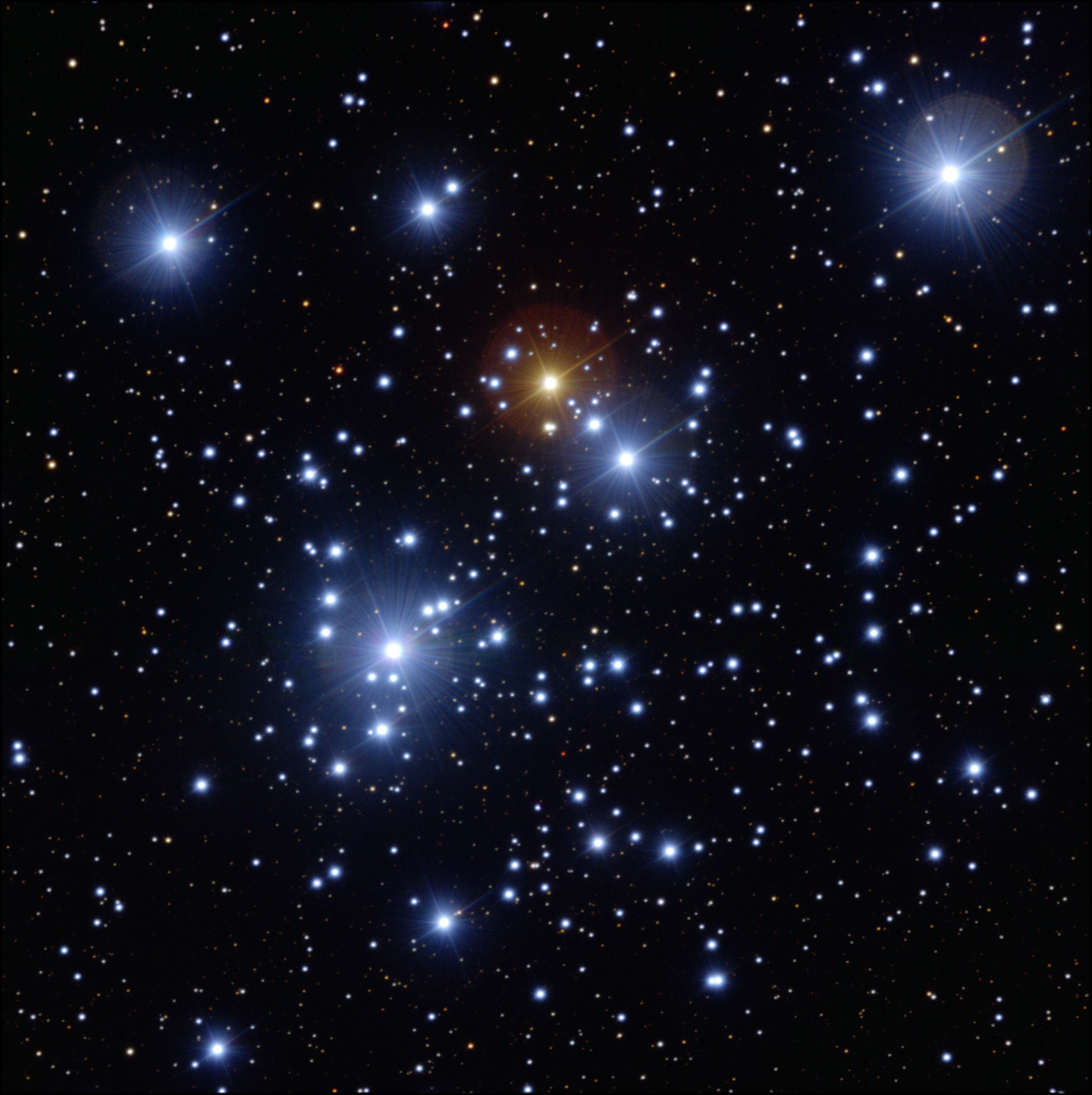
DU Crucis is the prominent red supergiant in the Jewel Box cluster (Credit: ESO VLT).

DU Crucis is one of the brighter members of the Jewel Box cluster and the brightest red supergiant, strongly contrasting with the other bright members which are blue supergiants. It is part of the central bar of the prominent letter A-shaped asterism at the centre of the cluster. The cluster is part of the larger Centaurus OB1 association and lies about 8,500 light years away.

The cluster is just to the south-east of β Crucis, the lefthand star of the Southern Cross.

== Properties ==
DU Crucis is an M2 intermediate luminosity supergiant (luminosity class Iab). Despite its low temperature, it is 46,600 times the luminosity of the Sun due to its very large size. The Jewel Box cluster has a calculated age of 11.2 million years.

== Variability ==
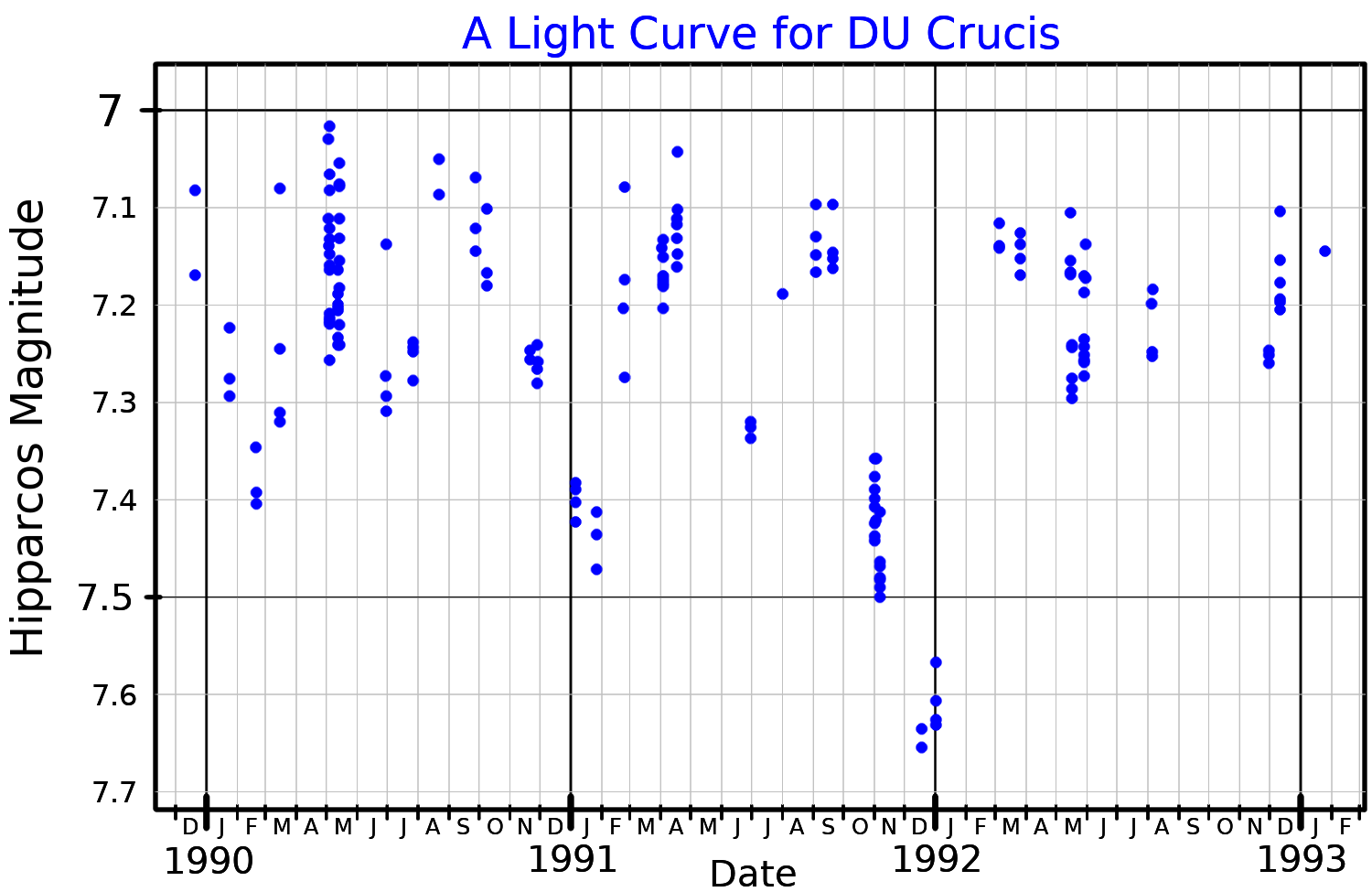
A light curve for DU Crucis, plotted from Hipparcos data

Photometry from the Hipparcos satellite mission showed that DU Crucis varies in brightness with an amplitude of 0.44 magnitudes. No periodicity could be detected in the variations and it was classified as a slow irregular variable of type Lc, indicating a supergiant.
