= Jewel Box (star cluster) =

Open cluster in the constellation Crux

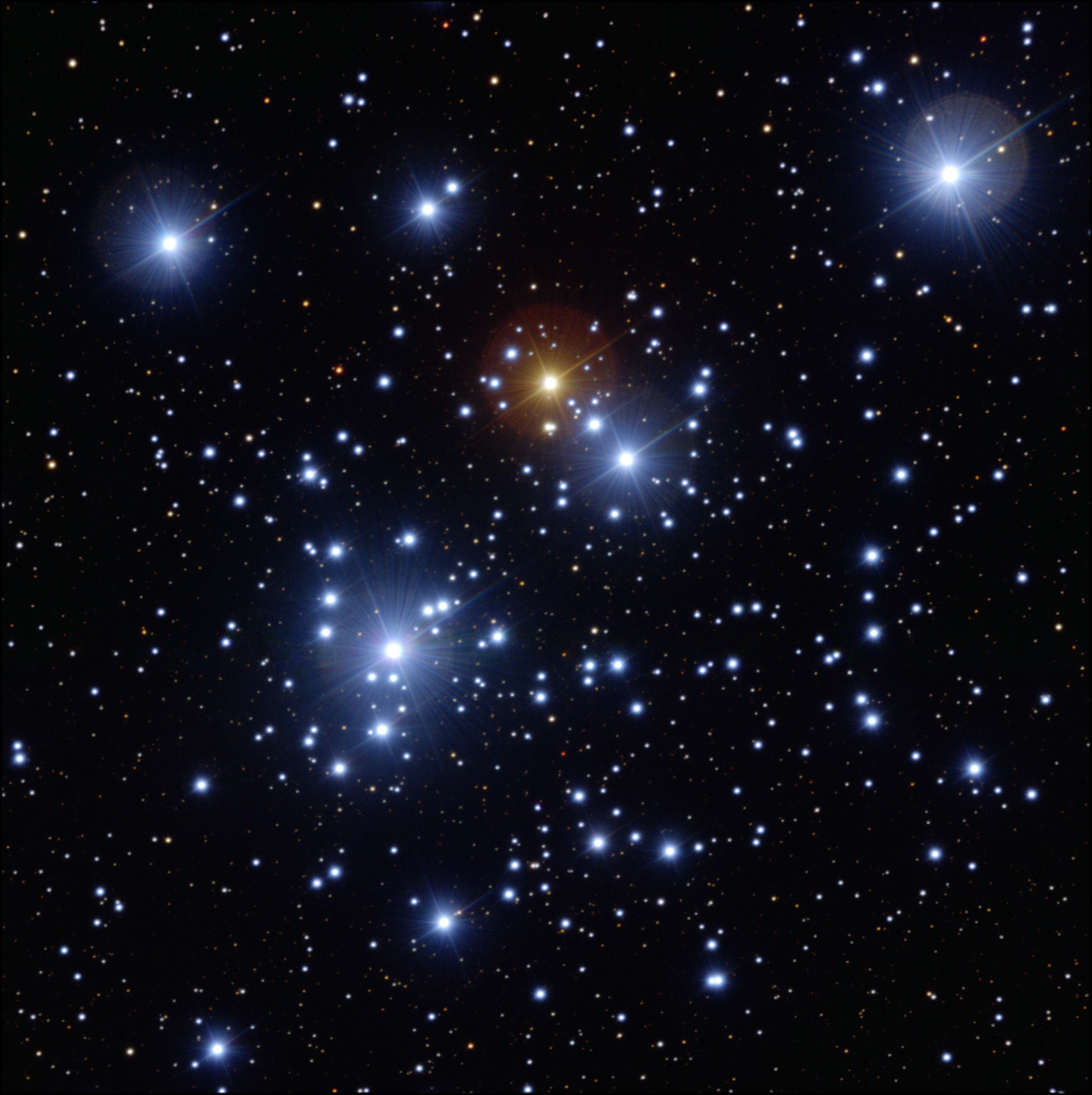
- NGC 4755 taken by the VLT; Credit: ESO

Observation data (J2000 epoch)
- Right ascension: 12^{h} 53^{m} 42^{s}
- Declination: −60° 22.0′
- Distance: 6.50 kly (1.99 kpc)

Physical characteristics
- Mass: – M_{☉}
- Radius: –
- Estimated age: 16 Myr
- –
- Other designations: Herschel's Jewel Box, κ Crucis cluster, NGC 4755, Cr 264, Caldwell 94

Associations
- Constellation: Crux

The Jewel Box (also known as the Kappa Crucis cluster, NGC 4755, or Caldwell 94) is an open cluster in the constellation Crux, originally discovered by Nicolas Louis de Lacaille in 1751–1752. This cluster was later named the Jewel Box by John Herschel when he described its telescopic appearance as "... a superb piece of fancy jewellery". It is easily visible to the naked eye as a hazy star some 1.0° southeast of the first-magnitude star Mimosa (Beta Crucis). This hazy star was given the Bayer star designation "Kappa Crucis", from which the cluster takes one of its common names. The modern designation Kappa Crucis has been assigned to one of the stars in the base of the A-shaped asterism of the cluster.

This cluster is one of the youngest known, with an estimated age of 14 million years. It has a total integrated magnitude of 4.2, is located 1.99 kpc, or 6497 light years from Earth, and contains just over 100 stars.

== Discovery and observation ==
The Jewel Box as a star cluster was first found by Nicolas Louis de Lacaille while doing astrometric observations for his 1751–1752 southern star catalogue Cœlum Australe Stelliferum at the Cape of Good Hope in South Africa. He saw this as a nebulous cluster in his small 12 mm ( 1 / 2 inch) telescope, but was first to recognise it as a group of many stars. The name "Jewel Box" comes from John Herschel's own description of it:

"... this cluster, though neither a large nor a rich one, is yet an extremely brilliant and beautiful object when viewed through an instrument of sufficient aperture to show distinctly the very different colour of its constituent stars, which give it the effect of a superb piece of fancy jewellery."

Herschel recorded the positions of just over 100 members of the cluster in 1834–1838.

== Prominent members ==
The central part of the cluster is framed by bright stars making up an A-shaped asterism. The upper tip of this asterism is HD 111904 (HR 4887, HIP 62894), a B9 supergiant and suspected variable star. It is the brightest member of the A asterism at magnitude 5.77. The brightest star in the region of the cluster is the variable DS Cru (HD 111613, HR 4876), which lies well beyond the A asterism. It is a B9.5 α Cyg variable supergiant with an average visual brightness of magnitude 5.72, but is thought to be a foreground object.

The bar of the "A" consists of a line of four stars, three of which are sometimes called the "traffic lights" because of their varying colour. On the right (south) is BU Cru, a magnitude 6.92 B2 supergiant and eclipsing binary. Next to it is BV Cru, a magnitude 8.662 B0.5 giant and Beta Cephei variable. Next in line is DU Cru, an M2 red supergiant that varies irregularly between magnitude 7.1 and 7.6 . The last of the four is CC Cru, a magnitude 7.83 B2 giant and ellipsoidal variable.

Each leg of the base of the asterism's outline is marked by a blue supergiant star. HD 111990 (HIP 62953) is magnitude 6.77 and B1/2. The star κ Cru itself is magnitude 5.98 and B3.

Name (Designation)	Distance (ly)	Stellar classification	Apparent magnitude
DS Crucis	7,200 ± 500	A1 Ia	5.741
HR 4887	9,000	B9 Ia	5.77
Kappa Crucis	7,500	B3Ia	5.98
HD 111990		B1.5I+	6.77
BU Crucis	7,300 ± 500	B2 Ia	6.80 - 6.90
DU Crucis	8,500	M2-Iab	7.45
CC Crucis		B2III	7.83
CN Crucis		B1V	8.58
BV Crucis		B0.5	8.66
EF Crucis		B2	10.174
CR Crucis		B5V	11.41
EH Crucis		B3V	11.69±0.04
CQ Crucis		B5III-V	12.47

== Physical characteristics ==
The Jewel Box cluster is one of the youngest known open clusters. The mean radial velocity of the Jewel Box cluster is −21 kilometres per second (−13 mi/s). The brightest stars in the Jewel Box cluster are supergiants, and include some of the brightest stars in the Milky Way galaxy.

Calculating its distance is difficult due to the proximity of the Coalsack Nebula, which obscures some of its light.

== Observation ==
The Jewel Box cluster is regarded as one of the finest objects in the southern sky. It is visible to the naked eye as a hazy object of the fourth magnitude. It can be easily located using the star Beta Crucis as a guide, and appears as a fourth magnitude object. It is impressive when viewed with binoculars or a small or large telescope. Three members along the crossbar of the A-shaped asterism lie in a straight line known as the 'traffic lights' due to their varying colours.

== Gallery ==
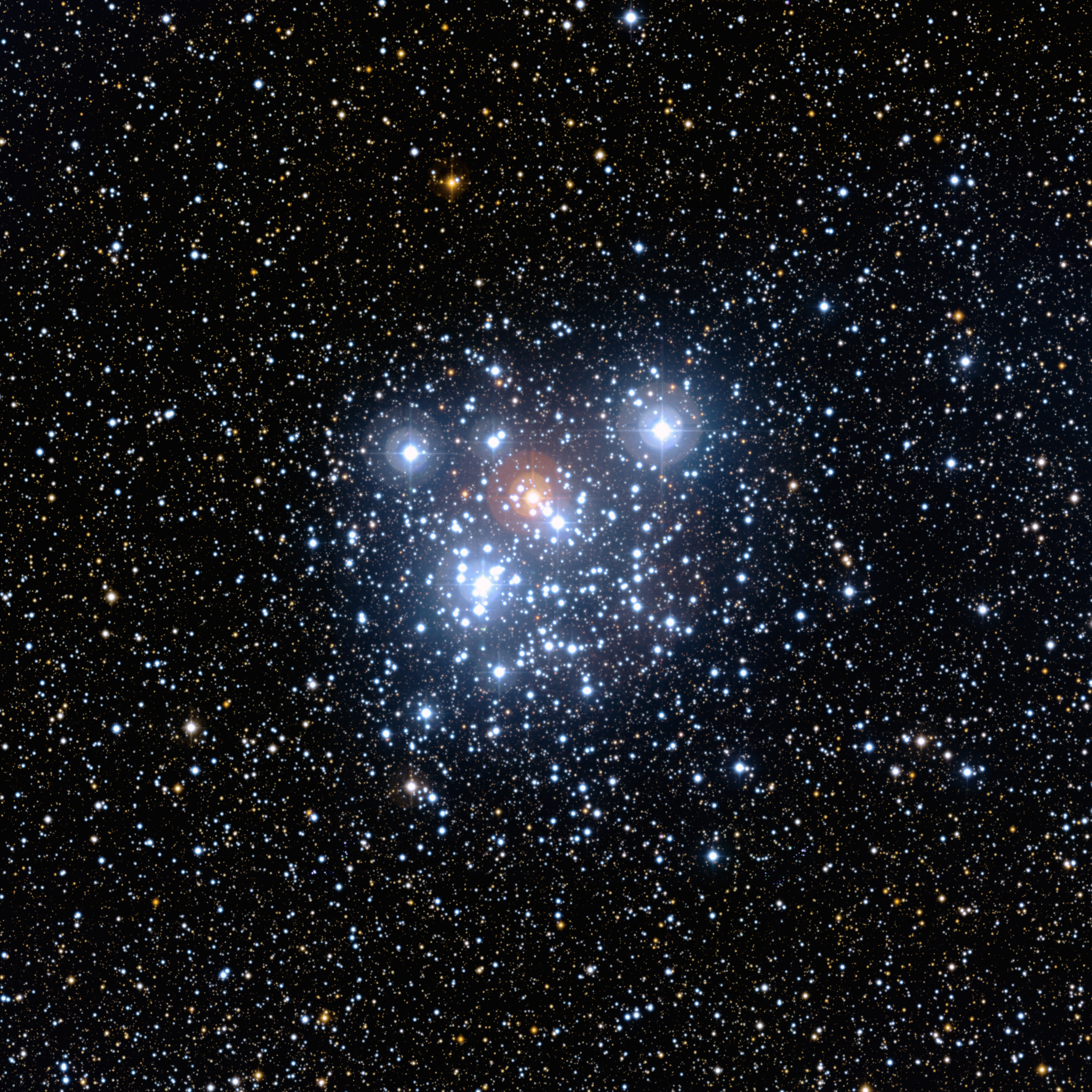
Wide Field Image of the Jewel Box

Digitized Sky Survey 2 image of the Jewel Box

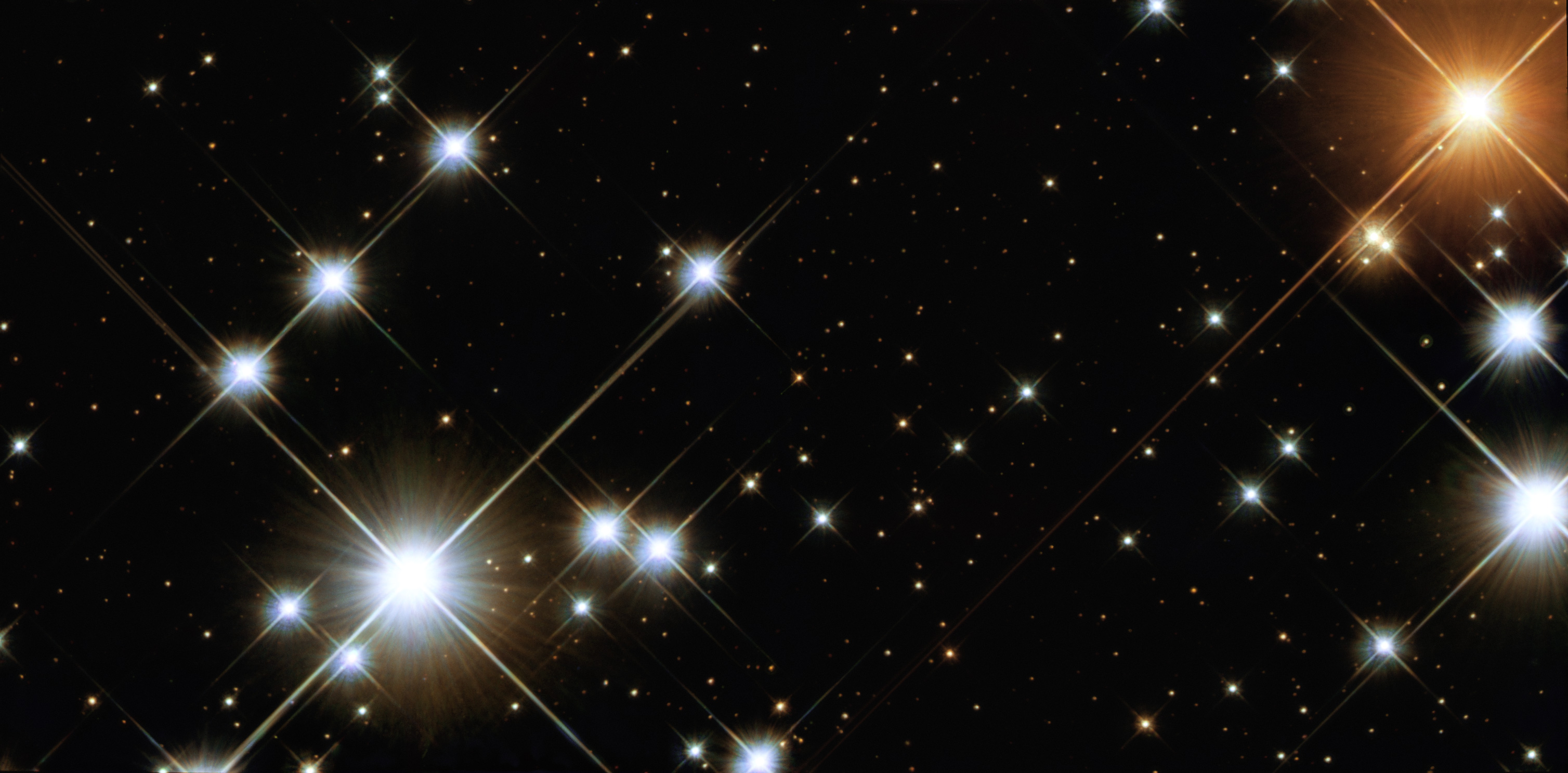
Hubble image of the Jewel Box

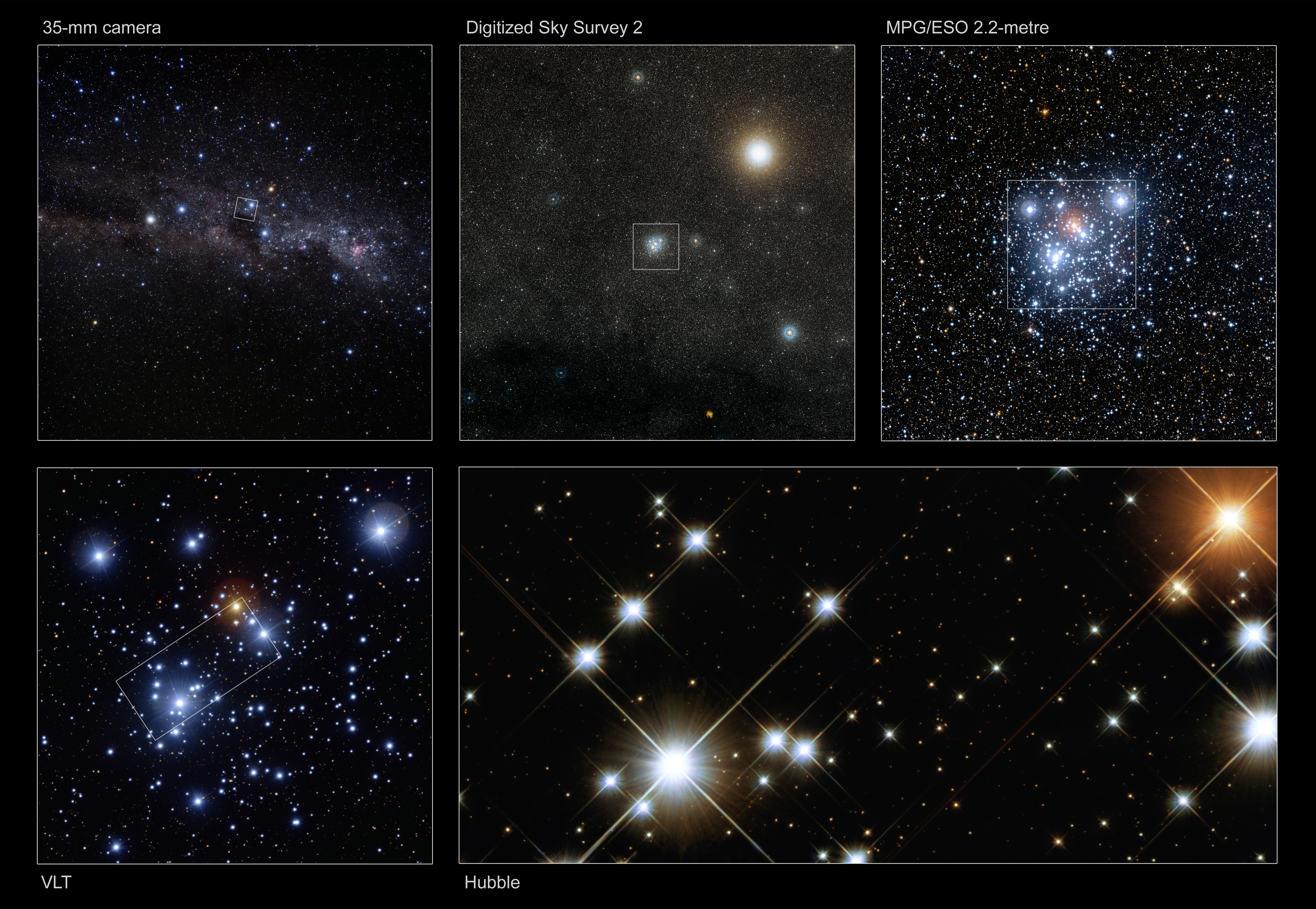
Putting the images in perspective

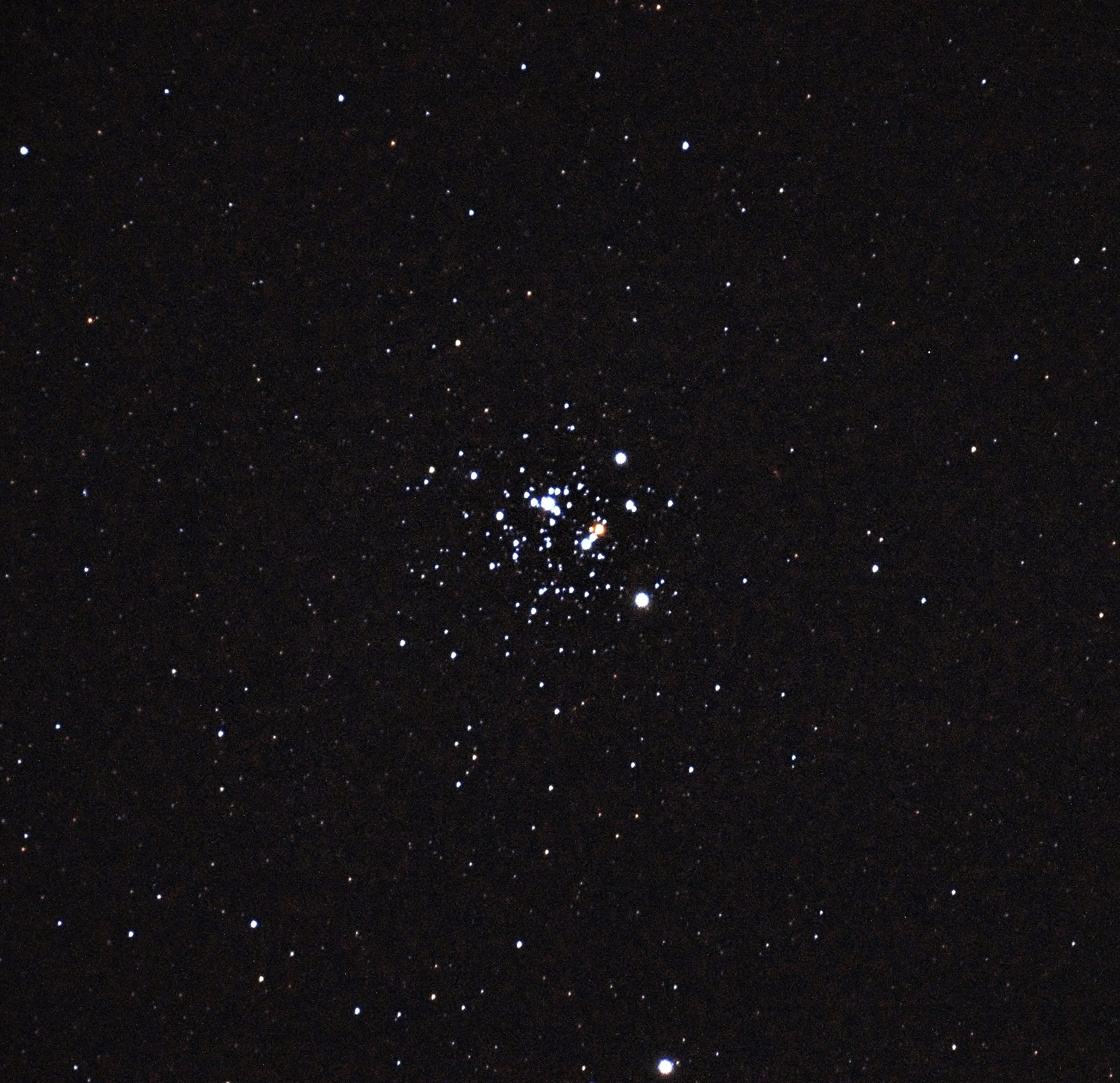
The Jewel Box seen through a small amateur telescope
