= V4381 Sagittarii =

Star in the constellation Sagittarius

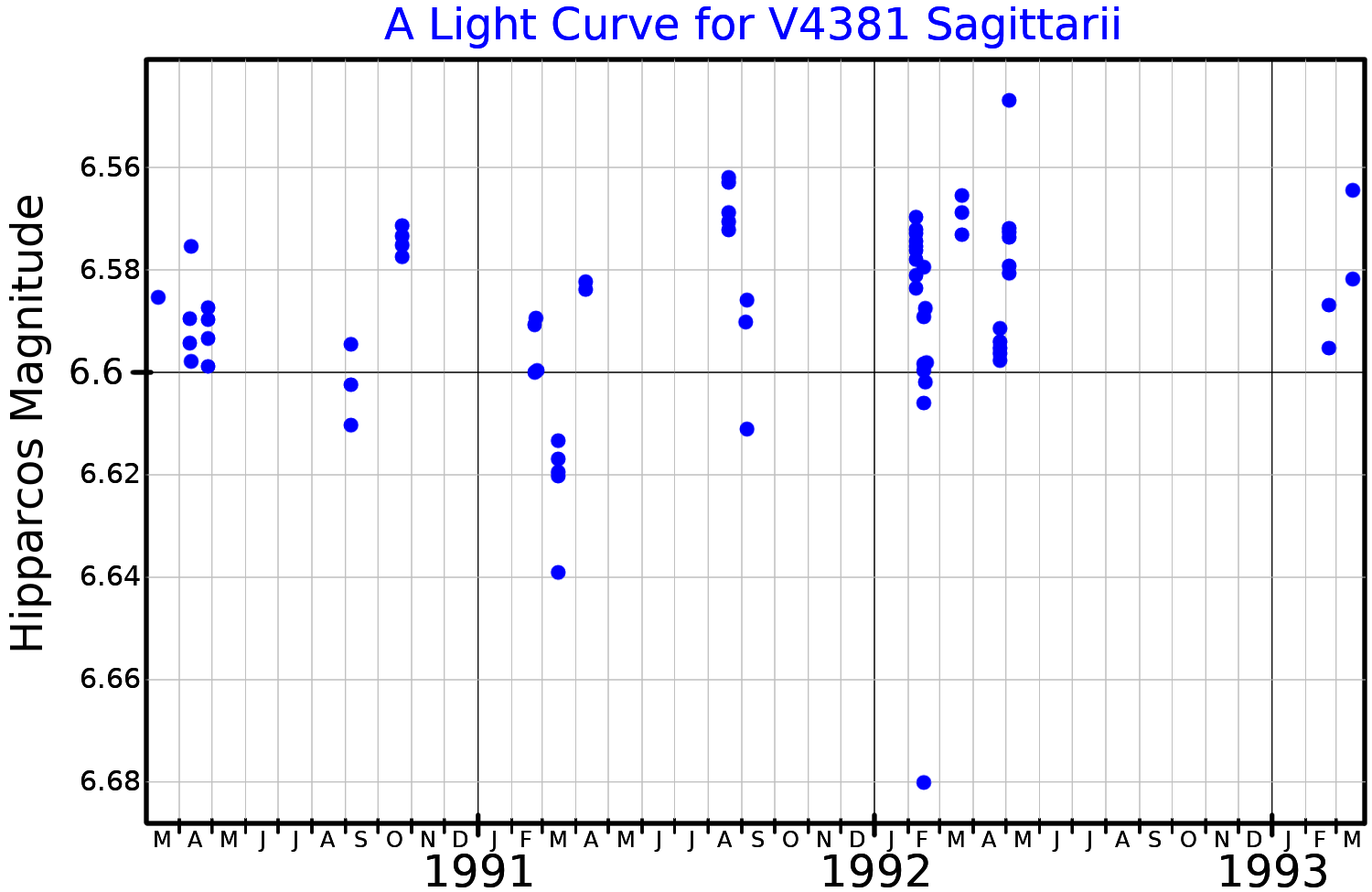
- A light curve for V4381 Sagittarii, plotted from Hipparcos data

Observation data Epoch J2000 Equinox ICRS
- Constellation: Sagittarius
- Right ascension: 18^{h} 08^{m} 38.58558^{s}
- Declination: −21° 26′ 58.4136″
- Apparent magnitude (V): 6.538 (6.57p - 6.62p)

Characteristics
- Evolutionary stage: Supergiant
- Spectral type: A2 Iab
- U−B color index: +0.279
- B−V color index: +0.856
- Variable type: α Cyg

Astrometry
Radial velocity (R_{v})	−16 km/s
Proper motion (μ)	RA: −1.65 mas/yr Dec.: −1.05 mas/yr
Parallax (π)	2.25±0.55 mas
Distance	approx. 1,400 ly (approx. 400 pc)
Absolute magnitude (M_{V})	−6.6

Details
Mass	7.00 M_{☉}
Luminosity	39,000 L_{☉}
Surface gravity (log g)	1.50 cgs
Temperature	9,000 K
Rotational velocity (v sin i)	18 km/s
Age	43.3 Myr

Other designations
- V4381 Sagittarii, HD 165784, HIP 88876, BD−21°4866, 2MASS J18083858-2126584

Database references
SIMBAD	data

V4381 Sagittarii is a star in the constellation Sagittarius. It was discovered to be a variable star in 1996, when the Hipparcos data was analysed. A white supergiant of spectral type A2/A3Iab, it is an Alpha Cygni variable that varies between apparent photographic magnitudes 6.57 and 6.62. Its visual apparent magnitude is about 6.54.

V4381 Sagittarii is associated with a small reflection and emission nebula, although it is not actually seen within the nebulosity. The nebula is catalogued as GN 18.05.6. It was first listed as VdB 113 and described as possibly associated with a loose open cluster. That name has since been used for the cluster itself, which is much more distant than the distance of V4381 Sagittarii derived from its Hipparcos parallax. The whole cluster is less than a quarter of a degree across, with dozens of members from 8th magnitude downwards. V4381 Sagittarii is listed as a probable member, while the nearby bright stars HD 165516 and WR 111 are considered unlikely to be members.

== Distance estimations ==
The distance to V4381 remains poorly determined as of 2021. The 2018 research based on radio interferometry has measured 2.2±0.6 milliarcseconds parallax, while Gaia Early Data Release 3, based on optical astrometry, have resulted in measured parallax 0.6273±0.0372.
