= 55 Cygni =

Star in the constellation Cygnus

- Location of 55 Cyg (circled)

Observation data Epoch J2000 Equinox ICRS
- Constellation: Cygnus
- Right ascension: 20^{h} 48^{m} 56.29119^{s}
- Declination: +46° 06′ 50.8824″
- Apparent magnitude (V): 4.81 - 4.87

Characteristics
- Spectral type: B2.5Ia - B4Ia
- U−B color index: −0.45
- B−V color index: +0.42
- Variable type: L or α Cyg

Astrometry
| Radial velocity (R_{v}) | −7.2 km/s |
| Proper motion (μ) | RA: −2.65 mas/yr Dec.: −2.84 mas/yr |
| Parallax (π) | 1.40±0.17 mas |
| Distance | 830 pc |
| Absolute magnitude (M_{V}) | −6.93 - −7.26 |

Details
| Mass | 23 M_{☉} |
| Radius | 54 - 65 R_{☉} |
| Luminosity | 324,000 - 478,000 L_{☉} |
| Surface gravity (log g) | 2.35 - 2.50 cgs |
| Temperature | 18,600 - 19,000 K |
| Rotational velocity (v sin i) | 61 km/s |

Other designations
- 55 Cyg, V1661 Cyg, HR 7977, BD+45°3291, HD 198478, SAO 50099, HIP 102724, AAVSO 2045+45

Database references
| SIMBAD | data |

55 Cygni (55 Cyg) is a blue supergiant star in the constellation Cygnus. It is thought to be a member of the Cygnus OB7 stellar association at about 2,700 light years.

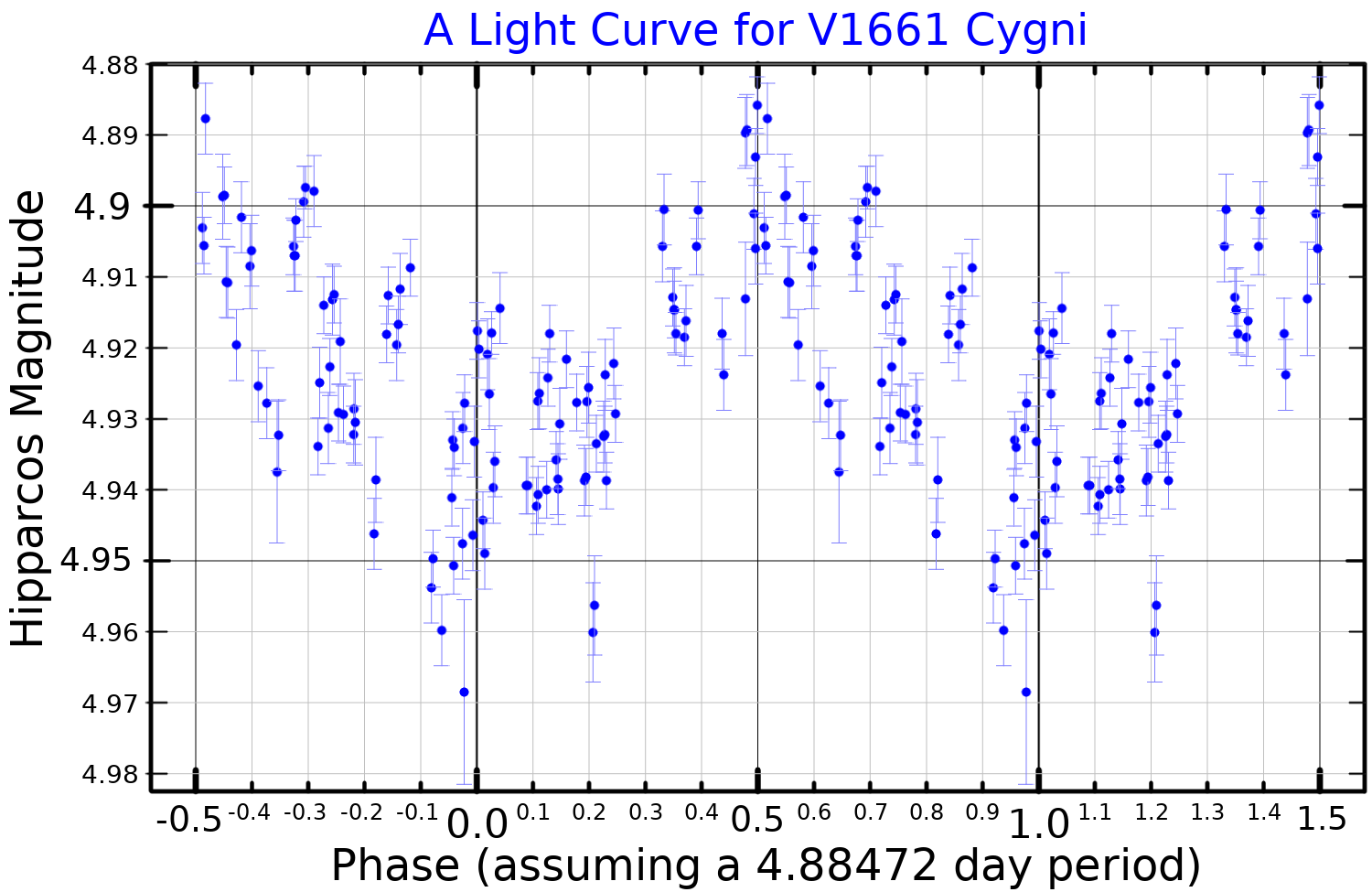
A light curve for V1661 Cygni, plotted from Hipparcos data

Its apparent magnitude is around 4.8, slightly variable, and the star is also called V1661 Cyg. When first analysed, it was classified as an irregular supergiant variable, but subsequent studies have treated it as an Alpha Cygni variable. It shows pulsations with multiple periods from a few hours to 22 days, and both p- and g-modes. Apart from p- and g-modes, strange mode and associated instabilities have also been found in models of this star. The spectrum also shows variation, leading to different classifications being given for the star.

The exact properties of 55 Cygni are not known precisely and are also variable. It is a hot luminous supergiant several hundred thousand times as luminous as the sun. This star was originally a standard for the B3 Ia spectral type.

The type of pulsations that 55 Cyg exhibits suggest that it was previously a red supergiant that has shed its outer layers. The most massive red supergiants are expected to pass through a blue supergiant phase before becoming a Wolf-Rayet star and eventually exploding as a type Ib or Ic supernova.
