= WR 111 =

Star in the constellation Sagittarius

Observation data Epoch J2000.0 Equinox ICRS
- Constellation: Sagittarius
- Right ascension: 18^{h} 08^{m} 28.46870^{s}
- Declination: −21° 15′ 11.1844″
- Apparent magnitude (V): +7.82

Characteristics
- Evolutionary stage: Wolf-Rayet
- Spectral type: WC5
- U−B color index: −0.38
- B−V color index: −0.28

Astrometry
Proper motion (μ)	RA: 0.293±0.129 mas/yr Dec.: −1.527±0.107 mas/yr
Parallax (π)	0.5826±0.0759 mas
Distance	1,630+320 −230 pc
Absolute magnitude (M_{V})	−4.26

Details

Semi-empirical model
Mass	13.0 M_{☉}
Radius	1.99 R_{☉}
Luminosity	245,000 L_{☉}
Temperature	89,000 K

Hydrodynamical model
Mass	13.63 M_{☉}
Radius	0.905 R_{☉}
Luminosity	282,000 L_{☉}
Temperature	140,000 K
Age	4.2 Myr

Other designations
- WR 111, HD 165763, HIP 88856, BD−21°4864, Hen 3-1599, 2MASS J18082846-2115113

Database references
SIMBAD	data

WR 111 (HD 165763) is a Wolf-Rayet (WR) star in the constellation Sagittarius. It is magnitude 7.8 and lies about 5,150 light-years away. It is one of the brightest and most closely studied WR stars.

== History ==
In 1880, Edward Pickering reported that BD−21°4864 had a spectrum similar to a nova, but it was apparently a non-variable star that had been near 8th magnitude since at least 1849. It was included in Campbell's 1894 paper The Wolf-Rayet stars.

In the Henry Draper Catalogue, BD−21°4864 was listed as entry 165763 with a spectral type of Oa. It was described in 1925 as a "Be star" due to its very strong emission lines, and in 1927 as a class-O star with unusually broad emission features. After the classification of WR stars onto either the nitrogen or carbon sequence, HD 165763 was designated as WC6 and its temperature estimated from the strength of Ov and Civ emission.

In 1968, the WR spectral classes were revised and HD 165763 was used as an example of class WC5. In this catalogue, considered as the fifth catalogue of Wolf Rayet stars, it was designated MR 84. In the sixth WR catalogue, the current naming convention was adopted and this star was numbered as WR 111.

== Location ==
WR 111 is one of the 20 brightest Wolf Rayet stars in the sky. It lies in a rich Milky Way field near to V4381 Sagittarii and HD 165516, but not apparently a member of the associated cluster.

== Properties ==
WR 111 is considered an archetypal WC5 star, having dominant emission lines of Civ, plus strong Ciii emission as well as Oiii, Oiv, and Ov, but not Ovi.

Non-hydrodynamical atmospheric models calculate a "surface" temperature of 89,000 K. The surface in this context is defined as the depth in the atmosphere at which the optical depth reaches 20. This differs from the convention used for many types of star, due to the optically dense stellar winds of WR stars. The corresponding radius is at 2.10 R_{☉}. A more detailed individual study of WR 111 using a hydrodynamical atmospheric model gives a temperature of 140,000 K and a radius of 0.905 R_{☉}. The apparently large difference is due largely to a difference in the depth within the atmosphere at which the radius is defined. The luminosity of WR 111 is similar in both models at 245,000 L_{☉} - 282,000 L_{☉}, and the masses are found to be 13.0 M_{☉} and 13.63 M_{☉}, respectively.

The stellar wind from WR 111 is ejecting 20 millionths of the Sun's mass every year at a speed of 2,398 km/s. The mechanism driving the intense stellar wind is found to be an opacity bump deep within the atmosphere caused by highly ionised iron. The winds are then accelerated to high velocity in the outer atmosphere by less highly ionised iron and by carbon and oxygen.
