= 3 Geminorum =

Star in the constellation Gemini

- Location of 3 Gem (circled)

Observation data Epoch J2000.0 Equinox J2000.0 (ICRS)
- Constellation: Gemini
- Right ascension: 06^{h} 09^{m} 43.9853^{s}
- Declination: +23° 06′ 48.472″
- Apparent magnitude (V): 5.71 - 5.77

Characteristics
- Evolutionary stage: Blue supergiant star
- Spectral type: B3Ia
- U−B color index: −0.63
- B−V color index: +0.21
- Variable type: α Cyg

Astrometry
Radial velocity (R_{v})	16.00±4.3 km/s
Proper motion (μ)	RA: −0.064 mas/yr Dec.: −2.685 mas/yr
Parallax (π)	0.3878±0.0616 mas
Distance	approx. 8,000 ly (approx. 2,600 pc)
Absolute magnitude (M_{V})	−6.26

Details
Mass	21 M_{☉}
Radius	55 R_{☉}
Luminosity	204,000 L_{☉}
Surface gravity (log g)	2.45 cgs
Temperature	16,500 K
Rotational velocity (v sin i)	80 km/s

Other designations
- 3 Geminorum, PU Gem, HR 2173, HIP 29225, HD 42087, BD+23°1226, AAVSO 0603+23

Database references
SIMBAD	data

3 Geminorum is a blue supergiant star in the constellation Gemini. It is a small amplitude pulsating variable and a close double star, with a mean combined apparent visual magnitude of about 5.7.

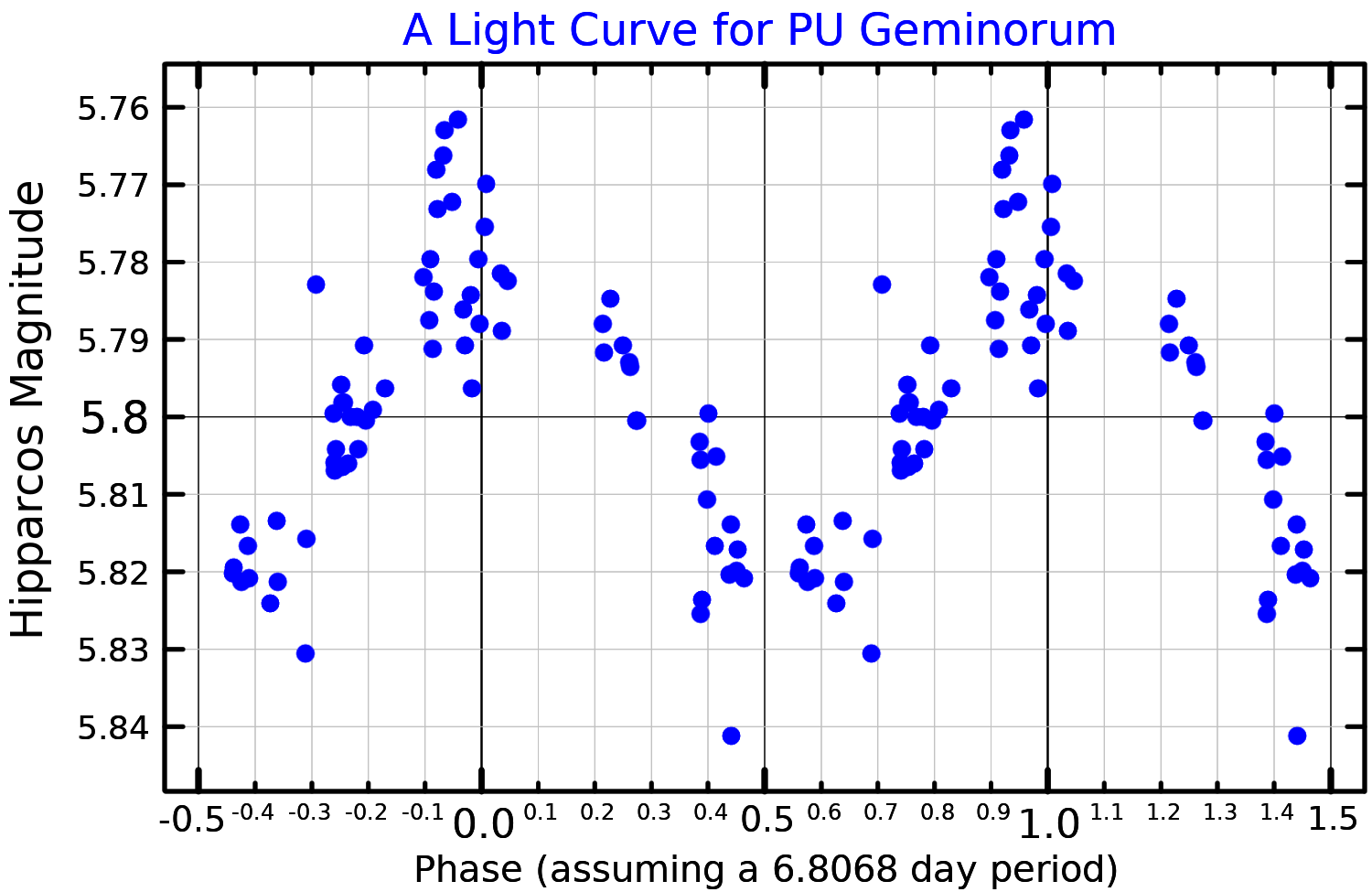
A light curve for PU Geminorum, plotted from Hipparcos data

3 Geminorum was found to be an α Cygni variable in 1998 and given the designation PU Geminorum. It varies by a few tenths of a magnitude with a main period of 6.807 days and a secondary period of 25 days.

3 Geminorum is also a close double star. The brighter component is the variable blue supergiant. The companion is 2.5 magnitudes fainter. The separation is about 0.6 arc-seconds. There is also a much fainter, approximately 14th magnitude, star 14" away.

Faint Hα emission lines have been detected in the spectrum of 3 Geminorum, but this is not usually expressed in published spectral classifications. An "e" is only occasionally appended to the spectral type to reflect the emission lines. 3 Geminorum has frequently been classified as a normal supergiant (luminosity class Ib), although a bright supergiant (Ia) luminosity class is now preferred.

3 Geminorum can be occulted by the Moon. Observations of these occultations can give information about the angular diameter of a star, or about close companions. Occultations of 3 Geminorum have been observed, but no double or diameter information has been published.
