= HD 37974 =

Star in the constellation Dorado

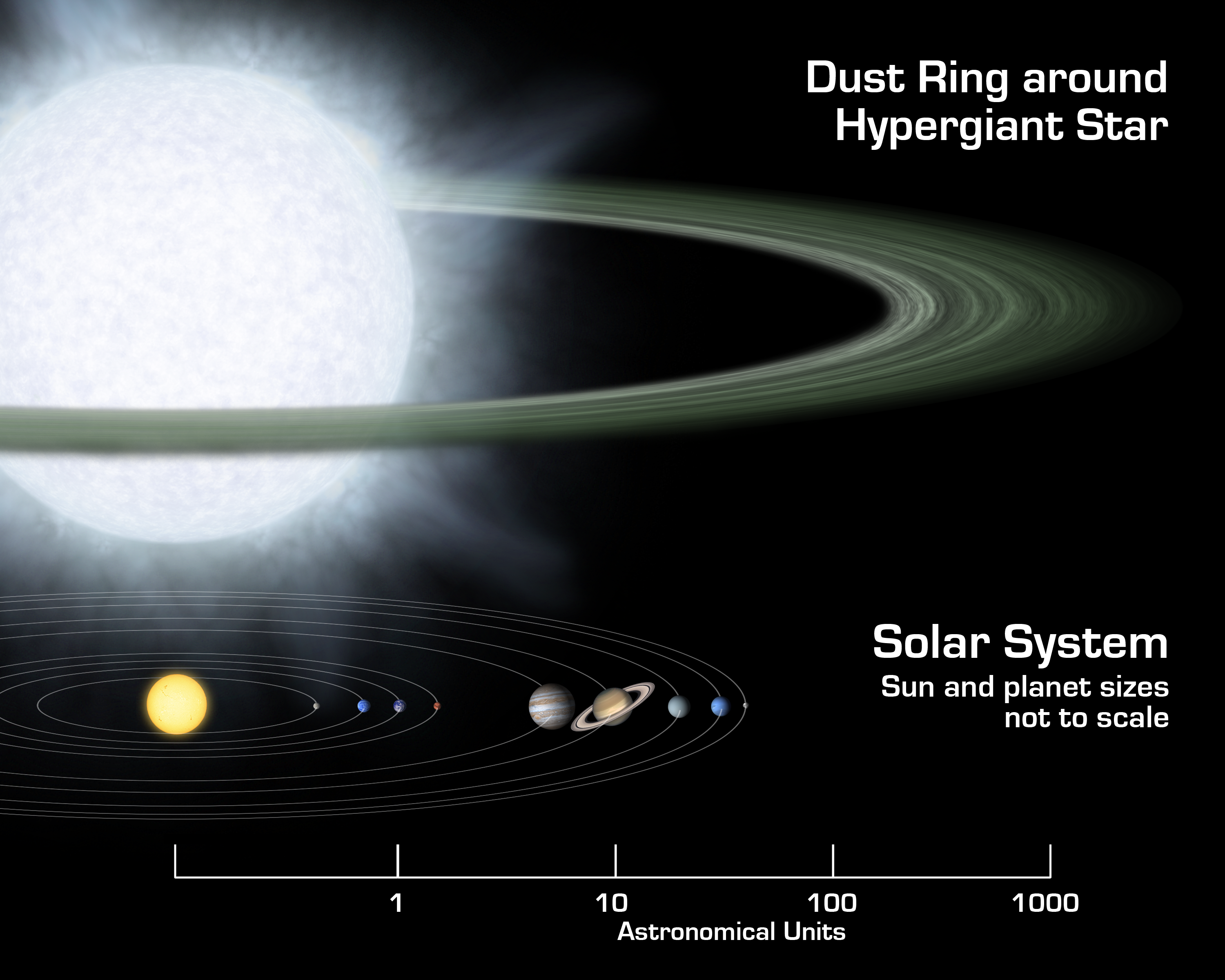
- Artist concept of the stars, Sun and planets not drawn to scale

Observation data Epoch J2000 Equinox ICRS
- Constellation: Dorado
- Right ascension: 05^{h} 36^{m} 25.843^{s}
- Declination: –69° 22′ 55.90″
- Apparent magnitude (V): 10.95

Characteristics
- Spectral type: B0.5Ia^{+}
- U−B color index: −0.88
- B−V color index: +0.15
- Variable type: LBV?

Astrometry
Radial velocity (R_{v})	258 km/s
Proper motion (μ)	RA: -1.8 mas/yr Dec.: -15.1 mas/yr
Parallax (π)	0.22±0.42 mas
Absolute magnitude (M_{V})	−8.4

Details
Mass	70 M_{☉}
Radius	78 (Note: Radius calculated with temperature and luminosity) R_{☉}
Luminosity	1,400,000 L_{☉}
Temperature	22,500 K

Other designations
- RMC 126, R 126, HD 37974, GSC 09167-00518, AL 361, GV 408, MSX LMC 890, CPD-69°420, MWC 123, LHA 120-S 127, LI-LMC 1413, LMC V3566; 2MASS J05362586-6922558

Database references
SIMBAD	data

HD 37974 (or R 126) a variable B[e] hypergiant in the Large Magellanic Cloud. It is surrounded by an unexpected dust disk.

== Properties ==
R126, formally RMC (Radcliffe observatory Magellanic Cloud) 126, is a massive luminous star with several unusual properties. It exhibits the B[e] phenomenon where forbidden emission lines appear in the spectrum due to extended circumstellar material. Its spectrum also shows normal (permitted) emission lines formed in denser material closer to the star, indicative of a power stellar wind. The spectra include silicate and polycyclic aromatic hydrocarbon (PAH) features that suggest a dusty disc.

The star itself is a hot supergiant thought to be seventy times more massive than the Sun and over a million times more luminous. It has evolved away from the main sequence (being an O-class star, when it was in MS) and is so luminous and large that it is losing material through its stellar wind over a billion times faster than the Sun. It would lose more material than the Sun contains in about 25,000 years.

It is expected to evolve into Wolf–Rayet star in several hundred thousand years.

== Dusty disc ==
The dust cloud around R126 is surprising because stars as massive as these were thought to be inhospitable to planet formation due to powerful stellar winds making it difficult for dust particles to condense. The nearby hypergiant HD 268835 shows similar features and is also likely to have a dusty disc, so R126 is not unique.

The disc extends outwards for 60 times the size of Pluto's orbit around the Sun, and probably contains as much material as the entire Kuiper belt. It is unclear whether such a disc represents the first or last stages of the planet-forming process.

== Variability ==
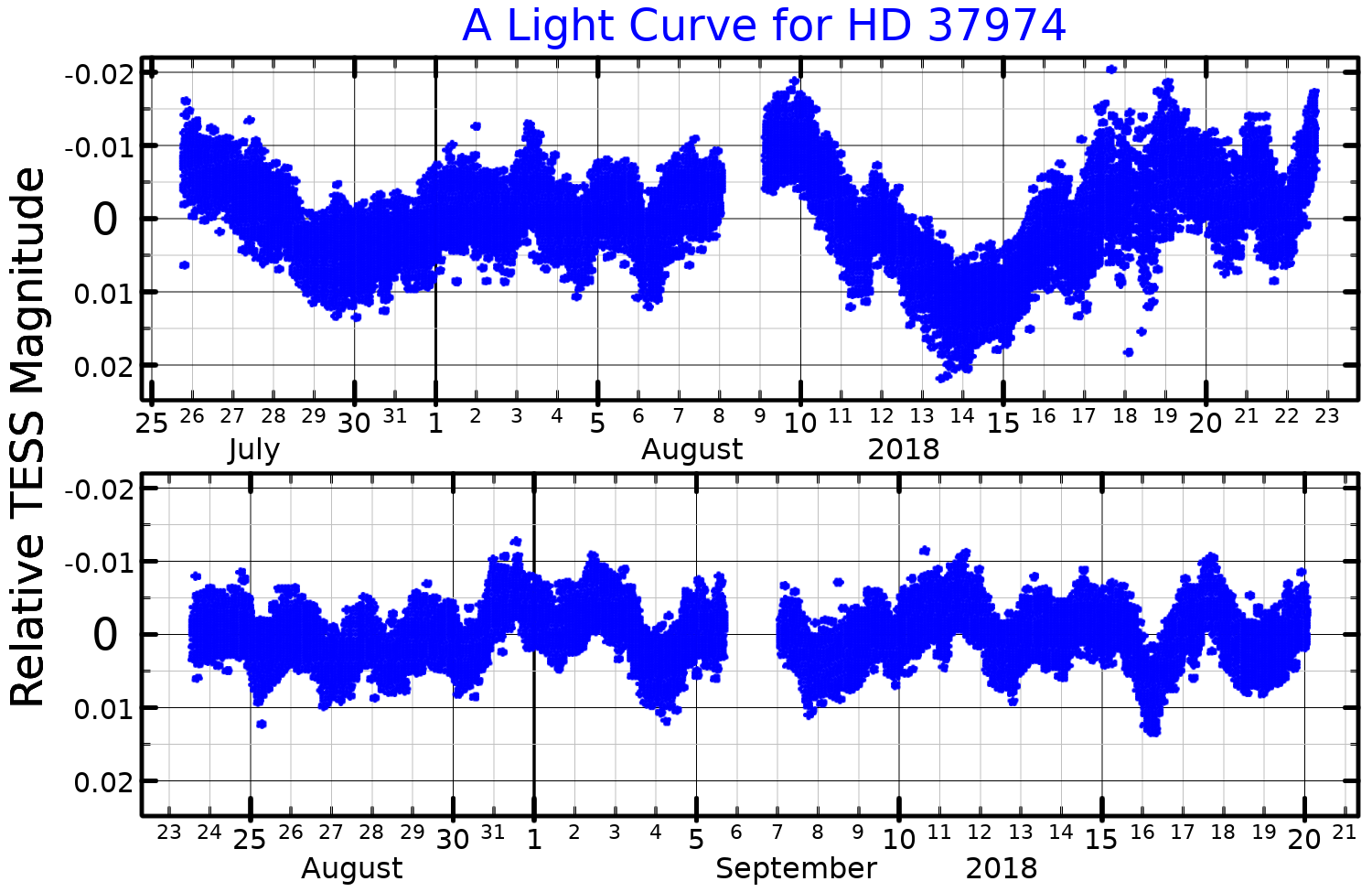
A light curve for HD 37974, adapted from Pedersen et al. (2019)

The brightness of R126 varies in an unpredictable way by around 0.6 magnitude over timescales of tens to hundreds of days. The faster variations are characteristic of α Cygni variables, irregular pulsating supergiants. The slower variations are accompanied by changes in the colour of the star, with it being redder when it is visually brighter, typical of the S Doradus phases of luminous blue variables.

== See also ==
- List of most massive stars
