= V399 Carinae =

Star in the constellation Carina

- Location of V399 Carinae (circled)

Observation data Epoch J2000.0 Equinox J2000.0
- Constellation: Carina
- Right ascension: 10^{h} 27^{m} 24.47049^{s}
- Declination: −57° 38′ 19.6984″
- Apparent magnitude (V): +4.63 to +4.72

Characteristics
- Spectral type: A5Iae or F0Ia
- U−B color index: +0.22
- B−V color index: +0.46
- Variable type: SRd?

Astrometry
Proper motion (μ)	RA: −7.377 mas/yr Dec.: +3.688 mas/yr
Parallax (π)	0.4976±0.1151 mas
Distance	approx. 7,000 ly (approx. 2,000 pc)
Absolute magnitude (M_{V})	−8.8

Details
Mass	22.6 M_{☉}
Radius	206 R_{☉}
Luminosity	73,000 L_{☉}
Surface gravity (log g)	1.00 cgs
Temperature	8,000 K
Metallicity [Fe/H]	−0.06 dex
Age	12 Myr

Other designations
- P Carinae, 195 G. Carinae, HR 4110, HD 90772, CP−57°3256, HIP 51192, SAO 238077, GC 14373, IC 2581 1

Database references
SIMBAD	data

V399 Carinae (V399 Car, P Carinae, P Car, 195 G. Carinae) is a variable star in the constellation Carina. It is visible to the naked eye.

The spectral type of V399 Carinae has been variously assigned between A5 and F0, being a bright, luminous supergiant. Its spectrum is described as having a non-photospheric continuum and silicon absorption lines, indicative of high mass loss.

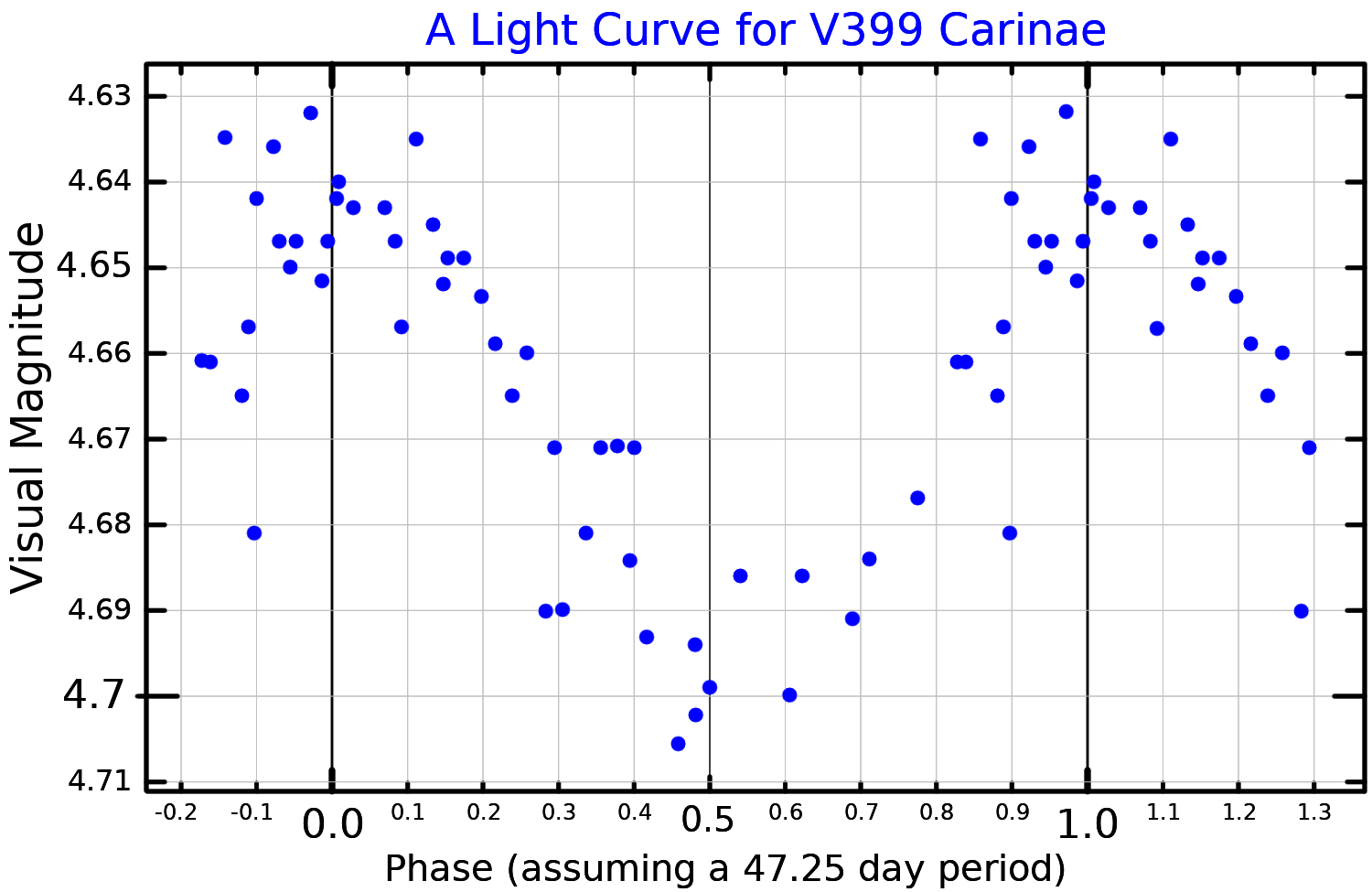
A visual band light curve for V399 Carinae, adapted from Berdnikov and Turner (1997)

V399 Carinae has long been suspected to be variable. A 1981 study of yellow supergiants fit observations to a Cepheid-like light curve with a period of 58.8 days, although the luminosity and spectral type do not place the star near the Cepheid instability strip. It was listed in the General Catalogue of Variable Stars as a possible δ Cep variable. Further observations refined the period to 47.25 days. The Hipparcos catalogue classified V399 Car as a semiregular variable with a period of 88 days and a mean amplitude of only 0.04 magnitudes. An automated classification from Hipparos photometry suggested it is an α Cygni variable. The observed brightness varies from magnitude +4.63 to +4.72.

V399 Carinae lies amongst the stars of the open cluster IC 2581, by far the brightest member of the cluster. It is about 7,500 light years from Earth assuming it is a member of IC 2581, which is given a 62.9% probability. Its angular diameter has been estimated at 0.954±0.09 milliarcseconds, which, at the estimated distance of 2009 parsecs, gives it a radius 206 times the solar radius.
