= HD 165516 =

Star in the constellation Sagittarius

- Location of HD 165516 (circled)

Observation data Epoch J2000.0 Equinox ICRS
- Constellation: Sagittarius
- Right ascension: 18^{h} 07^{m} 11.35^{s}
- Declination: −21° 26′ 38.2″
- Apparent magnitude (V): +6.33

Characteristics
- Spectral type: B1/2Ib
- U−B color index: −0.72
- B−V color index: +0.12

Astrometry
Radial velocity (R_{v})	-8.50 km/s
Proper motion (μ)	RA: −0.23 mas/yr Dec.: −1.15 mas/yr
Parallax (π)	1.39±0.49 mas
Distance	approx. 2,300 ly (approx. 700 pc)
Absolute magnitude (M_{V})	−5.8

Details
Mass	10.1 M_{☉}
Radius	26 R_{☉}
Temperature	25,000 K
Rotational velocity (v sin i)	55 km/s
Age	22.5 Myr

Other designations
- HR 6762, HD 165516, HIP 88760, BD-21°4855

Database references
SIMBAD	data

HD 165516 is a blue supergiant star in the constellation Sagittarius. It is part of the Sagittarius OB1 association and appears against a rich Milky Way starfield near the Trifid Nebula and Lagoon Nebula.

HD 165516 is close to a small reflection and emission nebula, and an associated loose open cluster. The nebula is catalogued as GN 18.05.6, but was first listed as VdB 113. That name has since been used for the cluster itself, which is likely more distant than HD 165516. The whole cluster is less than a quarter of a degree across, with dozens of members from 8th magnitude downwards. V4381 Sagittarii is listed as a probable member, while HD 165516 and the nearby Wolf-Rayet star WR 111 are considered unlikely to be members.
