= Kappa Crucis (star) =

Star in the constellation Crux

κ Crucis
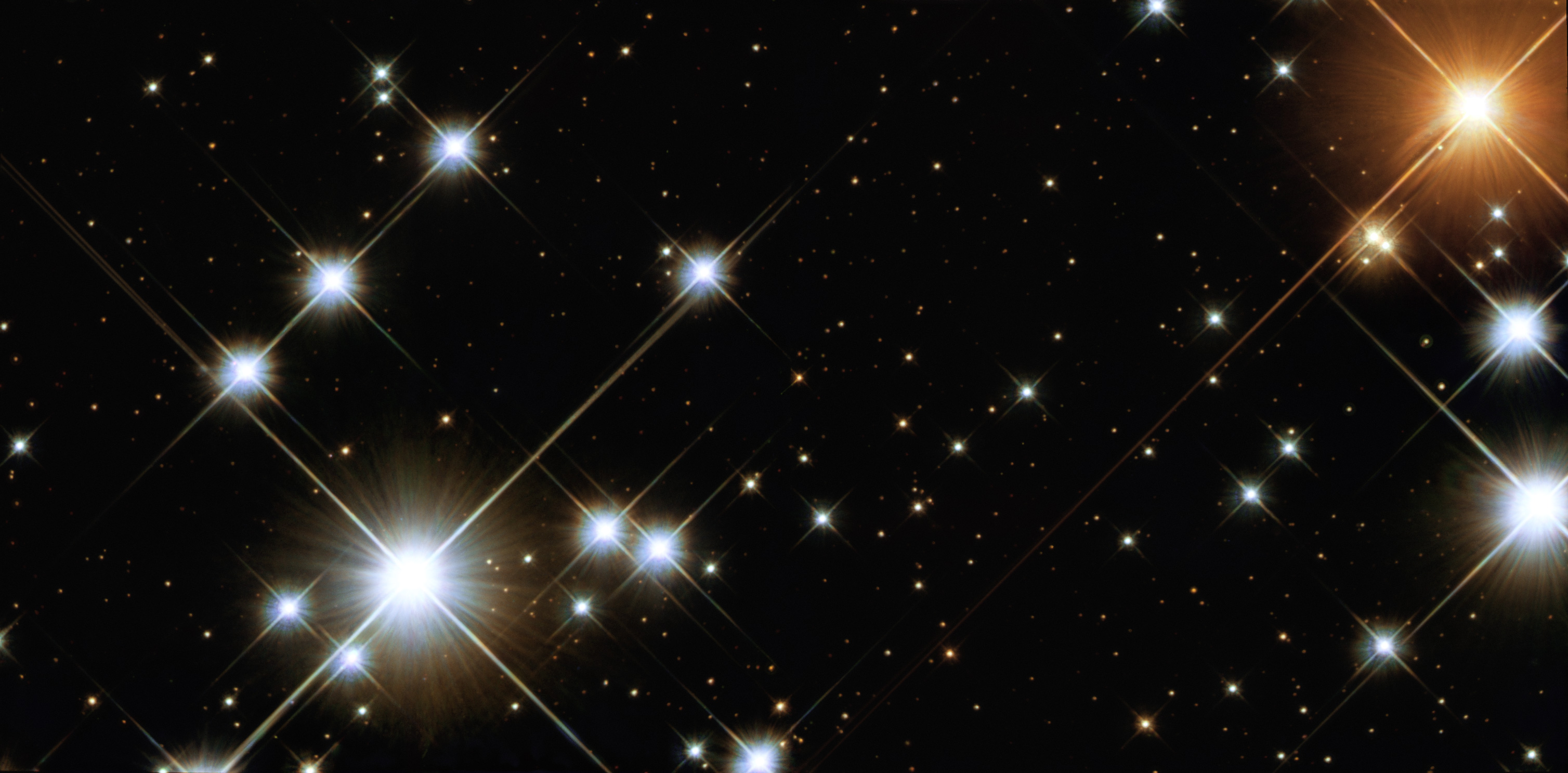
- The centre of NGC 4755, with κ Cru on the left Credit: NASA/ESA and Jesús Maíz Apellániz (Instituto de Astrofísica de Andalucía, Spain)

Observation data Epoch J2000 Equinox ICRS
- Constellation: Crux
- Right ascension: 12^{h} 53^{m} 48.920^{s}
- Declination: −60° 22′ 34.470″
- Apparent magnitude (V): 5.98

Characteristics
- Spectral type: B3Ia
- U−B color index: −0.58
- B−V color index: +0.22

Astrometry
Radial velocity (R_{v})	−3.5 km/s
Proper motion (μ)	RA: −5.046 mas/yr Dec.: −1.093 mas/yr
Parallax (π)	0.4334±0.0481 mas
Distance	approx. 7,500 ly (approx. 2,300 pc)
Absolute magnitude (M_{V})	−7.1

Details
Mass	23.0 M_{☉}
Radius	40 R_{☉}
Luminosity	151,000 L_{☉}
Surface gravity (log g)	2.25 cgs
Temperature	16,300 K
Rotational velocity (v sin i)	70 km/s

Other designations
- κ Cru, CD−59°4460, GC 17492, HD 111973, HIP 62931, HR 4890, SAO 252077, 2MASS J12534890-6022344

Database references
SIMBAD	data

Kappa Crucis is a binary star system in the southern Constellation of Crux. Its name is a Bayer designation that is Latinized from κ Crucis and abbreviated Kappa Cru or κ Cru. This is a spectroscopic binary system in the open cluster NGC 4755, which is also known as the Kappa Crucis Cluster or Jewel Box Cluster.

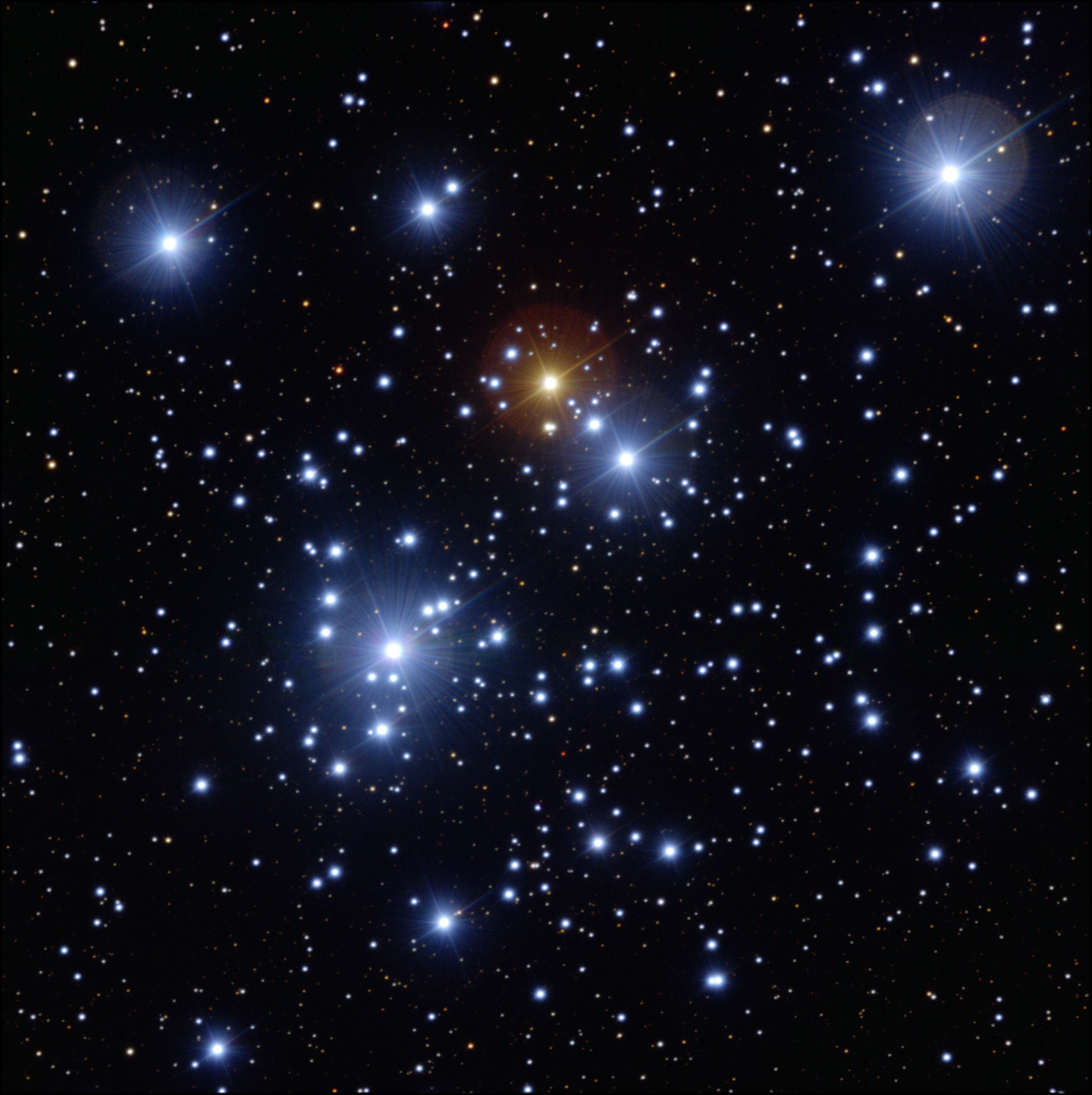
A snapshot of the Jewel Box Cluster (Credit: ESO VLT)

κ Crucis is one of the brightest members of the open cluster that bears its name, better known as the Jewel Box Cluster. It forms one leg, at bottom right or south, of the prominent letter "A" asterism at the centre of the cluster. The κ Crucis cluster has a calculated age of 11.2 million years. The cluster is part of the larger Centaurus OB1 association and lies about 8,500 light-years away. The cluster, and κ Cru itself, is just to the south-east of β Crucis, the lefthand star of the famous Southern Cross.

Kappa Crucis is a bright supergiant with a stellar classification of B3Ia. It is over 100,000 times the luminosity of the Sun, partly due to its higher temperature over 16,300 K, and partly to its larger size. The star displays luminosity variations with periods of 9.536 and 57.11 days. It is undergoing mass loss at a rate that varies over (0.14 to 0.21)×10^{−6} M_{☉}·yr^{−1}. Radial velocity variations in the spectral lines indicate that it has an unresolved companion star.
