= HD 268835 =

Star in the constellation Mensa

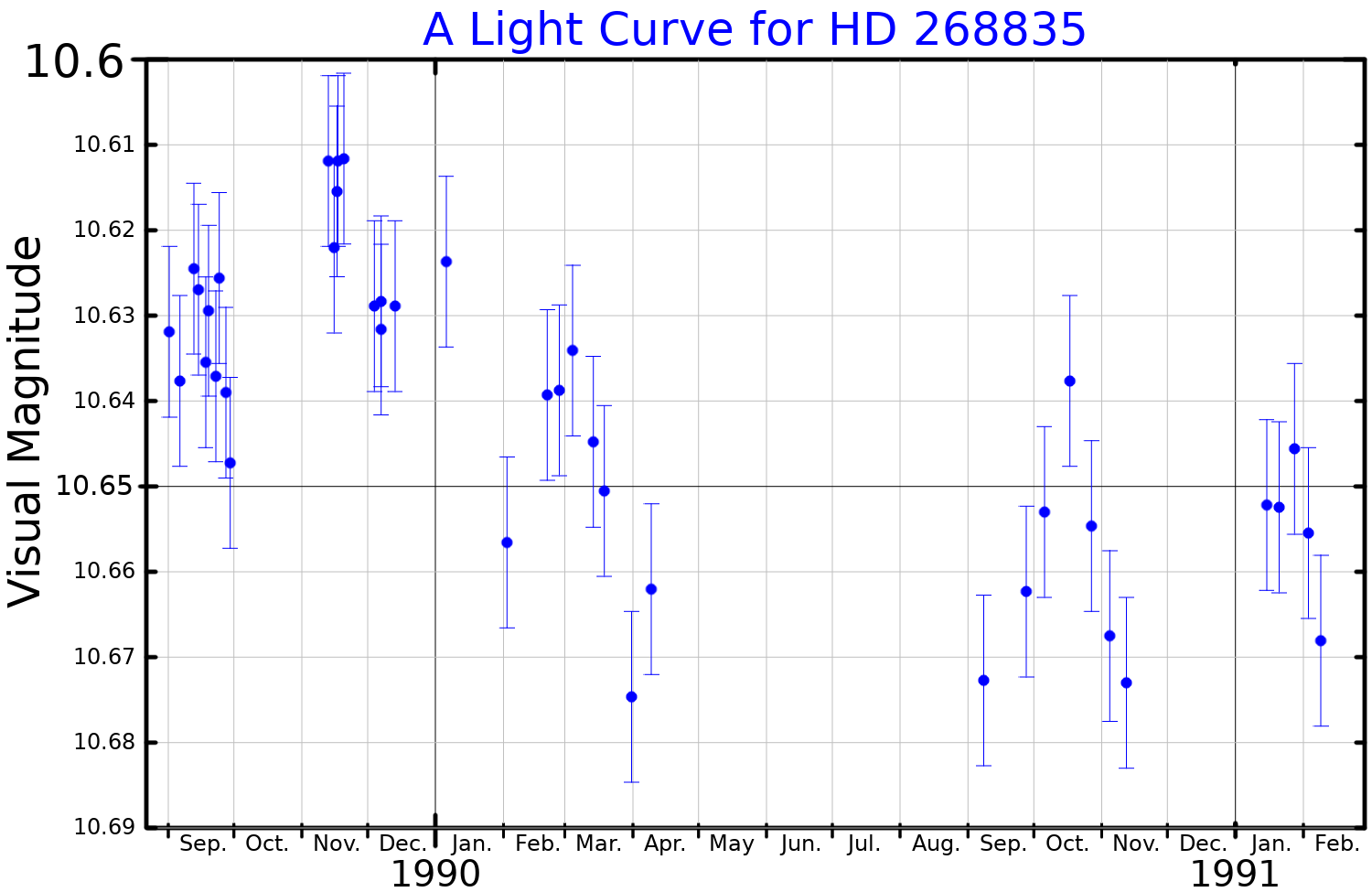
- A visual band light curve for HD 268835, adapted from van Genderen & Sterken (2002)

Observation data Epoch J2000 Equinox ICRS
- Constellation: Mensa
- Right ascension: 04^{h} 56^{m} 47.0791^{s}
- Declination: −69° 50′ 24.792″
- Apparent magnitude (V): 10.6

Characteristics
- Spectral type: B8Iae
- U−B color index: -0.66
- B−V color index: 0.14
- Variable type: LBV?

Astrometry
| Radial velocity (R_{v}) | 278 km/s |
| Proper motion (μ) | RA: 1.63 mas/yr Dec.: -2.38 mas/yr |
| Absolute magnitude (M_{V}) | -8.5 |

Details
| Mass | <30 M_{☉} |
| Radius | 131 R_{☉} |
| Luminosity | 320,000 L_{☉} |
| Temperature | 12,000 K |

Other designations
- HD 268835, HIP 22989, CD-70°273

Database references
| SIMBAD | data |

HD 268835 (or R66) (30 SM) is one of two stars that were identified by NASA's Spitzer Space Telescope in the Milky Way's nearest neighbor galaxy, the Large Magellanic Cloud (the other being R 126 or HD 37974), as being circled by monstrous dust disks that are theorised to be the origin of planets.

== Significance ==
Both HD 268835 and HD 37974 are classified as hypergiants, very large and very bright. The dust cloud around them surprised astronomers because stars as big as these were thought to be inhospitable to planet formation as they have very strong winds making it difficult/impossible for the dust clouds to "condense" into planets. "We do not know if planets like those in our solar system are able to form in the highly energetic, dynamic environment of these massive stars, but if they could, their existence would be a short and exciting one" said Charles Beichman, an astronomer at NASA's Jet Propulsion Laboratory and the California Institute of Technology, both in Pasadena, California.

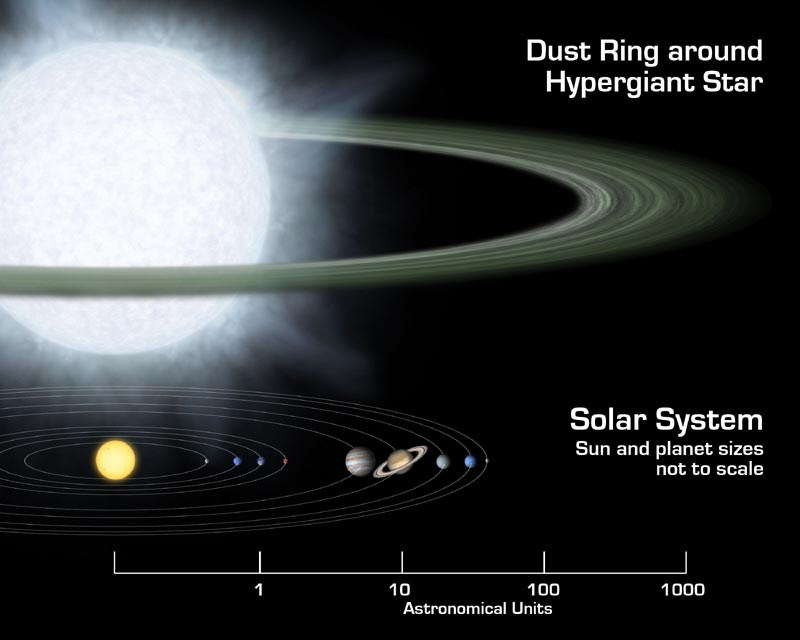
Artist's impression depicting HD 268835's dust disk compared to the Solar System

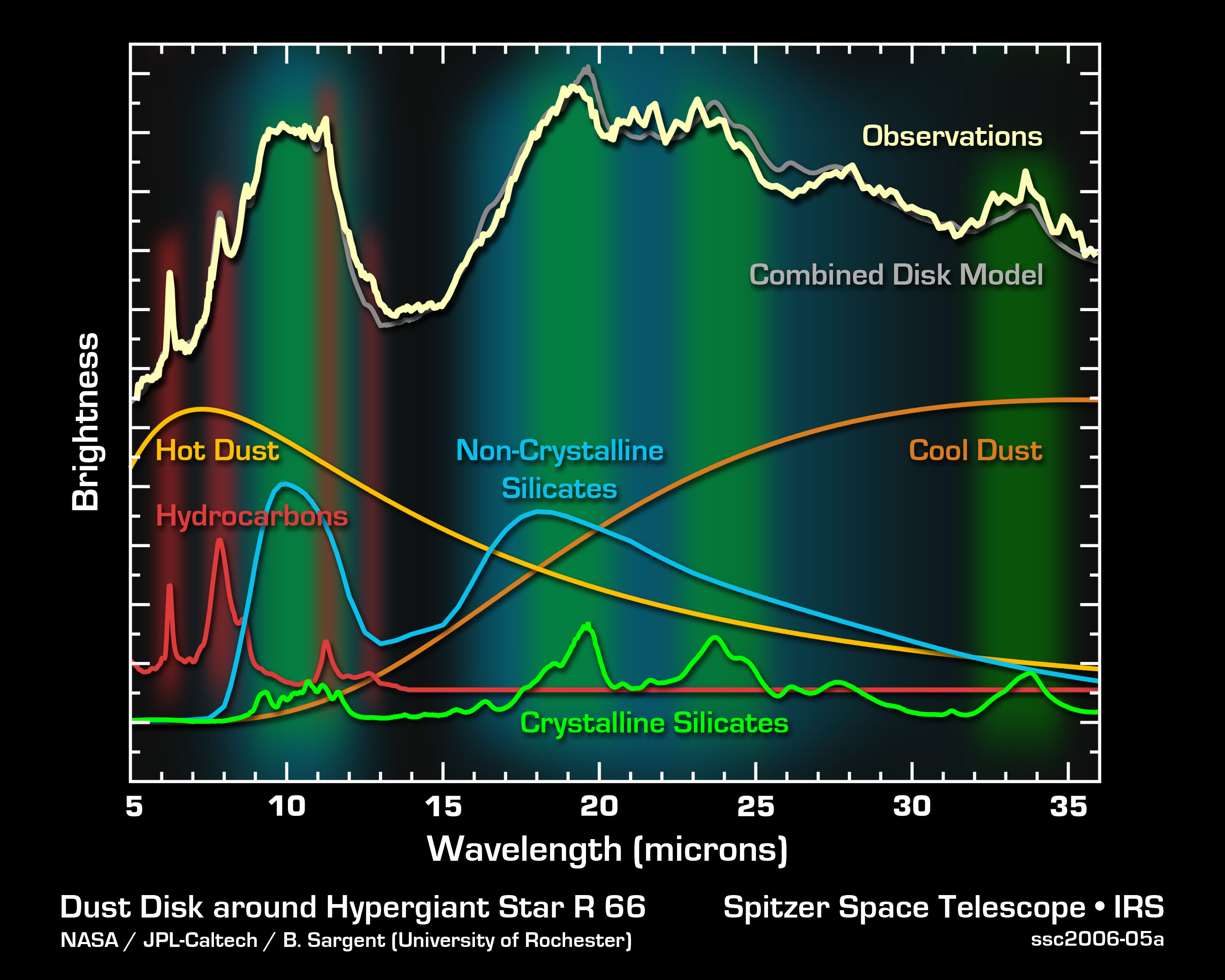
The infrared spectrum of HD 268835 compared to that of a multi-component model of the disk composition
