= Cygnus OB7 =

Very loose grouping of stars in the Cygnus constellation

Observation data (J2000.0 epoch)
- Constellation: Cygnus
- Right ascension: 21^{h} 08^{m} 00^{s}
- Declination: 47° 36′ 00″
- Mean distance: 2,050 ly (630 pc)

Physical characteristics

Cygnus OB7 is an OB association in the giant Cygnus molecular cloud complex, which also contains the star-forming regions Cygnus X, the North America Nebula and the Pelican Nebula. The Northern Coalsack Nebula of the Cygnus Rift lies in the foreground of this region. The molecular cloud has a large angular size of ~4° × 7°.
