= Alpha Cygni variable =

Variable stars which exhibit non-radial pulsations

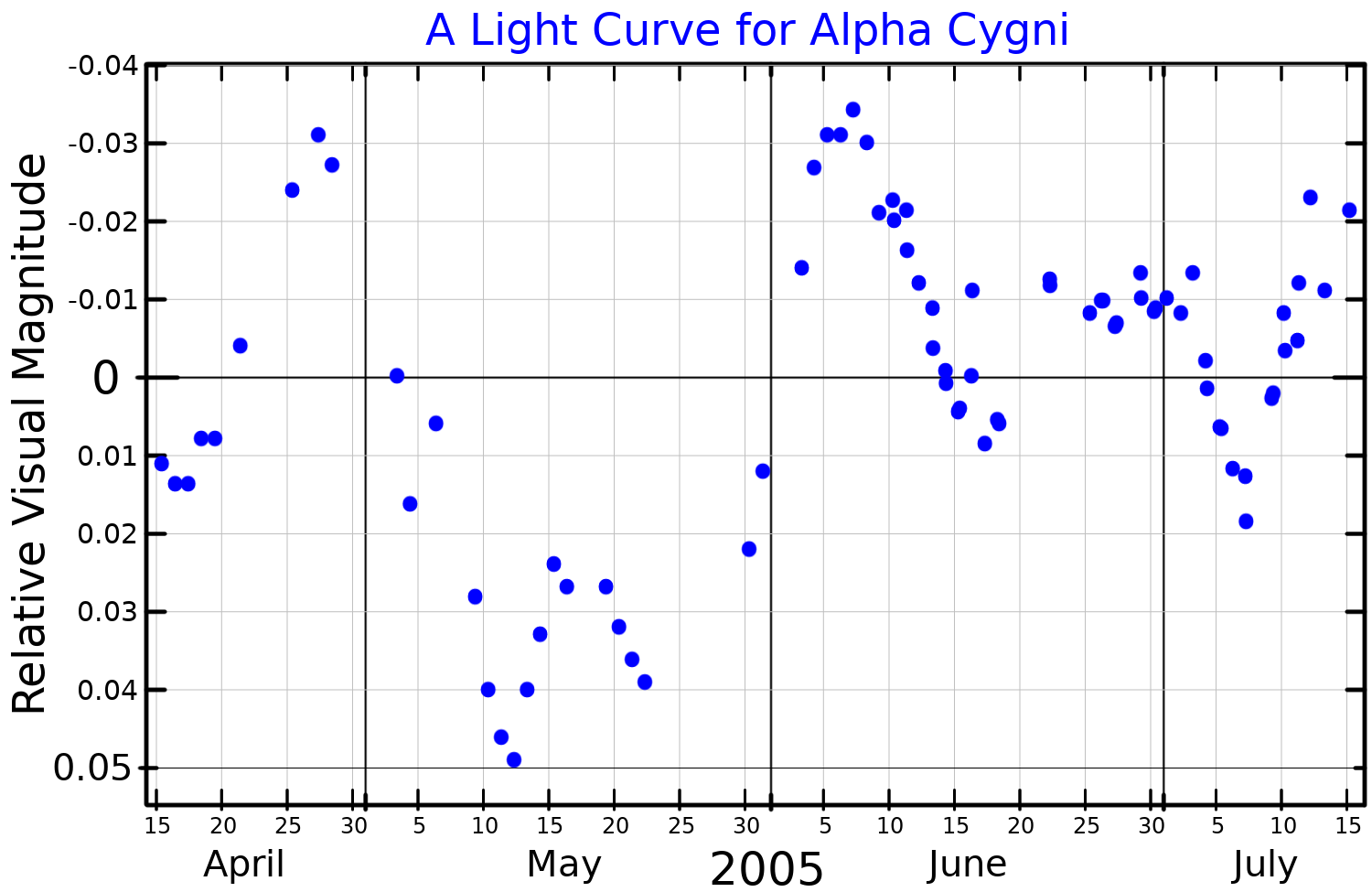
Light curve of Deneb, the prototype of the Alpha Cygni variables

Alpha Cygni variables are variable stars which exhibit non-radial pulsations, meaning that some portions of the stellar surface are contracting at the same time other parts expand. They are supergiant stars of spectral types B or A. Variations in brightness on the order of 0.1 magnitudes are associated with the pulsations, which often seem irregular, due to beating of multiple pulsation periods. The pulsations typically have periods of several days to several weeks.

The prototype of these stars, Deneb (α Cygni), exhibits fluctuations in brightness between magnitudes +1.21 and +1.29. Small amplitude rapid variations have been known in many early supergiant stars, but they were not formally grouped into a class until the 4th edition of the General Catalogue of Variable Stars was published in 1985. It used the acronym ACYG for Alpha Cygni variable stars. Many luminous blue variables (LBVs) show Alpha Cygni-type variability during their quiescent (hot) phases, but the LBV classification is generally used in these cases.

A large number (32) were discovered by Christoffel Waelkens and colleagues analysing Hipparcos data in a 1998 study.

== Pulsations ==
The pulsations of Alpha Cygni Variable stars are not fully understood. They are not confined to a narrow range of temperatures and luminosities in the way that most pulsating stars are. Instead, most luminous A and B supergiants, and possibly also O and F stars, show some type of unpredictable small-scale pulsations. Nonadiabatic strange mode radial pulsations are predicted but only for the most luminous supergiants. Pulsations have also been modelled for less luminous supergiants by assuming they are low mass post-red supergiant stars, but most Alpha Cygni variables do not appear to have passed through the red supergiant stage.

The pulsations are likely induced by kappa mechanism, caused by iron opacity variations, with strange modes producing the observed short periods for both radial and non-radial pulsations. Non-adiabatic g-modes may produce longer period variations, but these have not been observed in Alpha Cygni variables.

== List ==
=== Galactic ===
Designation (name)	Constellation	Discovery	Maximum Apparent magnitude (m_{V})	Minimum Apparent magnitude (m_{V})	Period (days)	Spectral class	Luminosity	Comment
CE Cam (HD 21389)	Camelopardalis	Percy & Welsh (1983)	4^{m}.54			A0Iab	63,000	
CS Cam	Camelopardalis	Rufener (1982)	4^{m}.259			B9Ia	75,900	
η CMa (Aludra)	Canis Major	Kazarovets et al. (1999)	2^{m}.38	2^{m}.48	4.70433	B5Ia	105,000	
ο^{2} CMa	Canis Major	Waelkens et al. (1998)	2^{m}.98	3^{m}.04	24.44	B3Ia	219,000	
κ Cas (Cexing)	Cassiopeia	Percy & Welsh (1983)	4^{m}.12	4^{m}.21	2.64690	B1Ia	331,000	
6 Cas	Cassiopeia	Abt (1957)	5^{m}.34	5^{m}.45	30	A2.5 Ia^{+}	200,000	Hypergiant
ο^{2} Cen	Centaurus		5^{m}.12	5^{m}.22	46.3	A2Ia	136,000	
ν Cep	Cepheus	Percy & Welsh (1983)	4^{m}.25	4^{m}.35		A2 Iab	254,000	
DL Cru	Crux	Waelkens et al. (1998)	6^{m}.24	6^{m}.28	2.8778	B1.5Ia	242,000	
Deneb	Cygnus	Lee (1910)	1^{m}.21	1^{m}.29		A2 Ia	196,000	Prototype
σ Cyg	Cygnus	Abt (1957)	4^{m}.19	4^{m}.26	120.2	B9 Iab	39,000	
55 Cyg	Cygnus	Hill et al. (1976)	4^{m}.81	4^{m}.87		B2.5 Ia	~400,000	
3 Gem	Gemini	Waelkens et al. (1998)	5^{m}.75		13.70	B3 Ia	200,000	
ρ Leo (Shaomin)	Leo	Olsen (1974)	3^{m}.83	3^{m}.9	3.4271	B1Iab	295,000	
β Ori (Rigel)	Orion	Waelkens et al. (1998)	0^{m}.17	0^{m}.22		B8Ia	279,000 218,000	Brightest member
ε Ori (Alnilam)	Orion	Cousins (1960)	1^{m}.64	1^{m}.74		B0.5Iabea	275,000 537,000	
χ^{2} Ori	Orion	Waelkens et al. (1998)	4^{m}.68	4^{m}.72	2.8682	B2Ia	446,000	
9 Per	Perseus	Abt (1957)	5^{m}.15	5^{m}.25		A2 Ia	141,000	

=== Extragalactic ===
Designation (name)	Galaxy	Discovery	Maximum Apparent magnitude (m_{V})	Minimum Apparent magnitude (m_{V})	Period (days)	Spectral class	Luminosity	Comment
LHA 115-S 18	SMC		13^{m}.3		Complex	B[e]sg		Possible LBV
HDE 268835	LMC		10^{m}.60	10^{m}.68	>100	B8p		
HD 37974	LMC		10^{m}.92	11^{m}.00	400	B0.5Ia^{+}		
HD 37836	LMC		10^{m}.55			B0Iae		LBV candidate

== Sources ==
- Samus N.N., Durlevich O.V., et al. Combined General Catalog of Variable Stars (GCVS4.2, 2004 Ed.)
