= Mimosa (star) =

Star in the constellation Crux

- Location of Mimosa (circled)

Observation data Epoch J2000 Equinox ICRS
- Constellation: Crux
- Pronunciation: /mɪˈmoʊsə/
- Right ascension: 12^{h} 47^{m} 43.26877^{s}
- Declination: −59° 41′ 19.5792″
- Apparent magnitude (V): 1.25 (1.23 - 1.31)

Characteristics
- Spectral type: B0.5 III
- U−B color index: −0.98
- B−V color index: −0.23
- Variable type: β Cep

Astrometry
Radial velocity (R_{v})	+15.6 km/s
Proper motion (μ)	RA: −42.97 mas/yr Dec.: −16.18 mas/yr
Parallax (π)	11.71±0.98 mas
Distance	280 ± 20 ly (85 ± 7 pc)
Absolute magnitude (M_{V})	−3.92

Orbit
Primary	β Crucis A
Name	β Crucis B
Period (P)	1828.0±2.5 days
Semi-major axis (a)	8.7 AU
Eccentricity (e)	0.38±0.09
Inclination (i)	92.2±0.7°
Longitude of the node (Ω)	342.6±2.2°
Periastron epoch (T)	2,449,879±38 HJD
Argument of periastron (ω) (secondary)	293±9°

Details

A
Mass	14.5±0.5 M_{☉}
Radius	7.3–8.9 R_{☉}
Luminosity	25,700+4,500 −3,830 L_{☉}
Surface gravity (log g)	3.6±0.1 cgs
Temperature	28,840 K
Metallicity [Fe/H]	−0.08 dex
Rotation	13–17 days
Rotational velocity (v sin i)	16±2 km/s
Age	11.3±1.6 Myr

B
Mass	1.90±0.07 M_{☉}

D
Mass	0.78 M_{☉}

Other designations
- Mimosa, Becrux, β Crucis, CPD−59°4451, FK5 481, HD 111123, HIP 62434, HR 4853, SAO 240259

Database references
SIMBAD	data

Mimosa is the second-brightest object in the southern constellation of Crux (after Acrux), and the 20th-brightest star in the night sky. It has the Bayer designation β Crucis, which is Latinised to Beta Crucis and abbreviated Beta Cru or β Cru. Mimosa forms part of the prominent asterism called the Southern Cross. It is a triple star system.

== Nomenclature ==
β Crucis (Latinised to Beta Crucis) is the system's Bayer designation. Although Mimosa is at roughly −60° declination, and therefore not visible north of 30° latitude, in the time of the ancient Greeks and Romans it was visible north of 40° due to the precession of equinoxes, and these civilizations regarded it as part of the constellation of Centaurus.

It bore the traditional names Mimosa and the historical name Becrux /ˈbeɪkrʌks/. Mimosa, which is derived from the Latin for 'actor', may come from the flower of the same name. Becrux is a modern contraction of the Bayer designation. In 2016, the International Astronomical Union organized a Working Group on Star Names (WGSN) to catalog and standardize proper names for stars. The WGSN's first bulletin of July 2016 included a table of the first two batches of names approved by the WGSN; which included Mimosa for this star.

In Chinese, 十字架 (Shí Zì Jià), meaning Cross, refers to an asterism consisting of Acrux, Mimosa, Gacrux, and δ Crucis. Consequently, Mimosa itself is known as 十字架三 (Shí Zì Jià sān, English: the Third Star of Cross).

The Mursi people of Ethiopia call this star Thaadoi; it forms an asterism with δ Crucis (Imai), β Centauri (Waar), and α Centauri (Sholbi).

== Stellar system ==
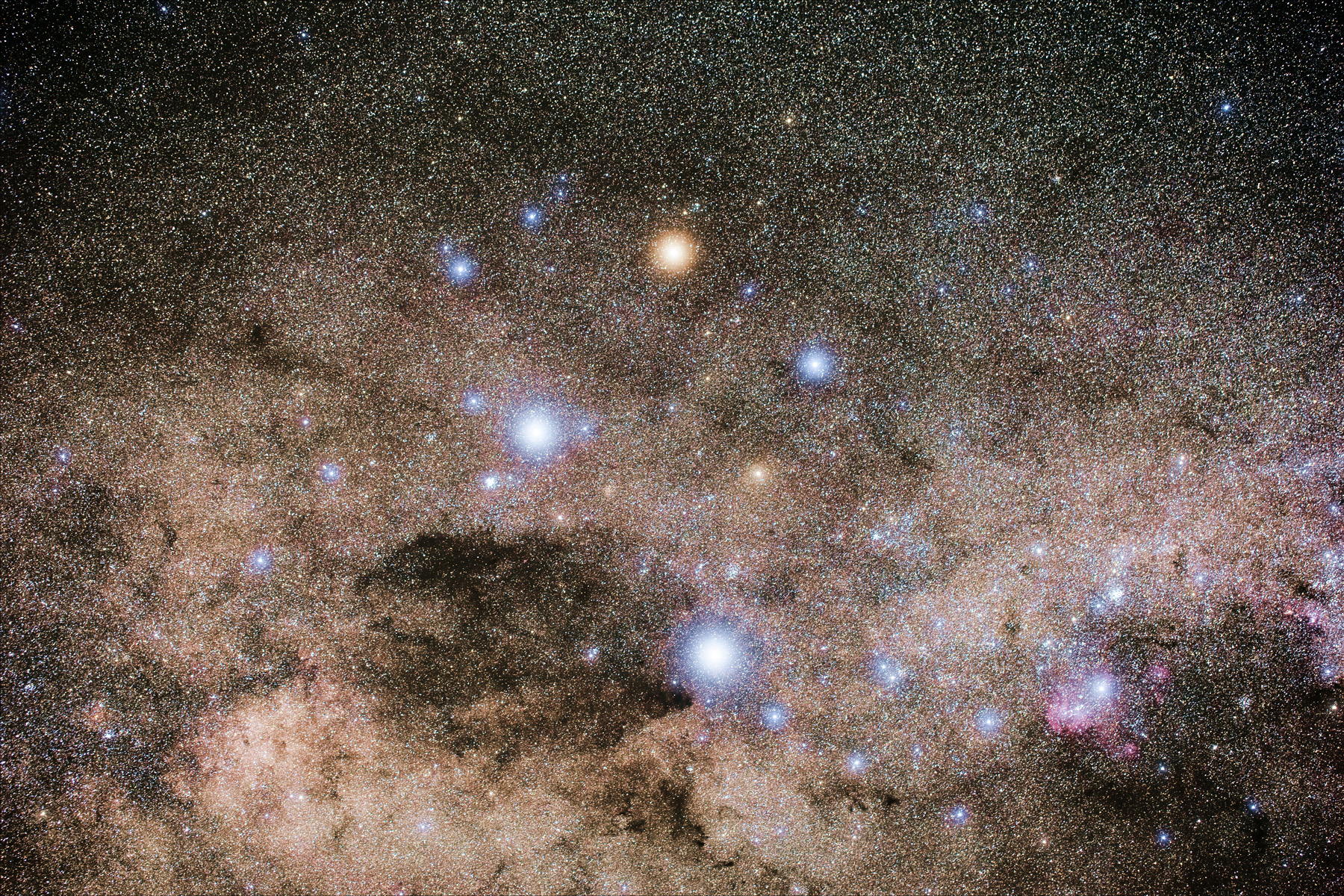
The constellation Crux

Based on parallax measurements, Mimosa is located at a distance of 280 ly (86 pc) from the Earth. In 1957, German astronomer Wulff-Dieter Heintz discovered that it is a spectroscopic binary with components that are too close together to resolve with a telescope. The pair orbit each other every 5 years with an estimated separation that varies from 5.4 to 12.0 Astronomical Units. The system is only 8 to 11 million years old.

The primary, β Crucis A, has a stellar classification of B0.5 III, classifying it as a blue giant that exausted the hydrogen supply at its core. Asteroseismic observations have measured its mass to be 15 times the Sun's mass, its radius to be between 7.3 and 8.9 times the Sun's radius and its age to be 11 million years—it is the most massive star with an age derived by this method. Mimosa has sufficient mass to explode as a supernova, which might occur in roughly 6 million years. The projected rotational velocity of this star is about 16 km s^{−1}. Given that the inclination of the star's pole to the line of sight is 46°, the azimuthal rotational velocity is about 22 km s^{−1}, resulting in a rotational period of 13 to 17 days.

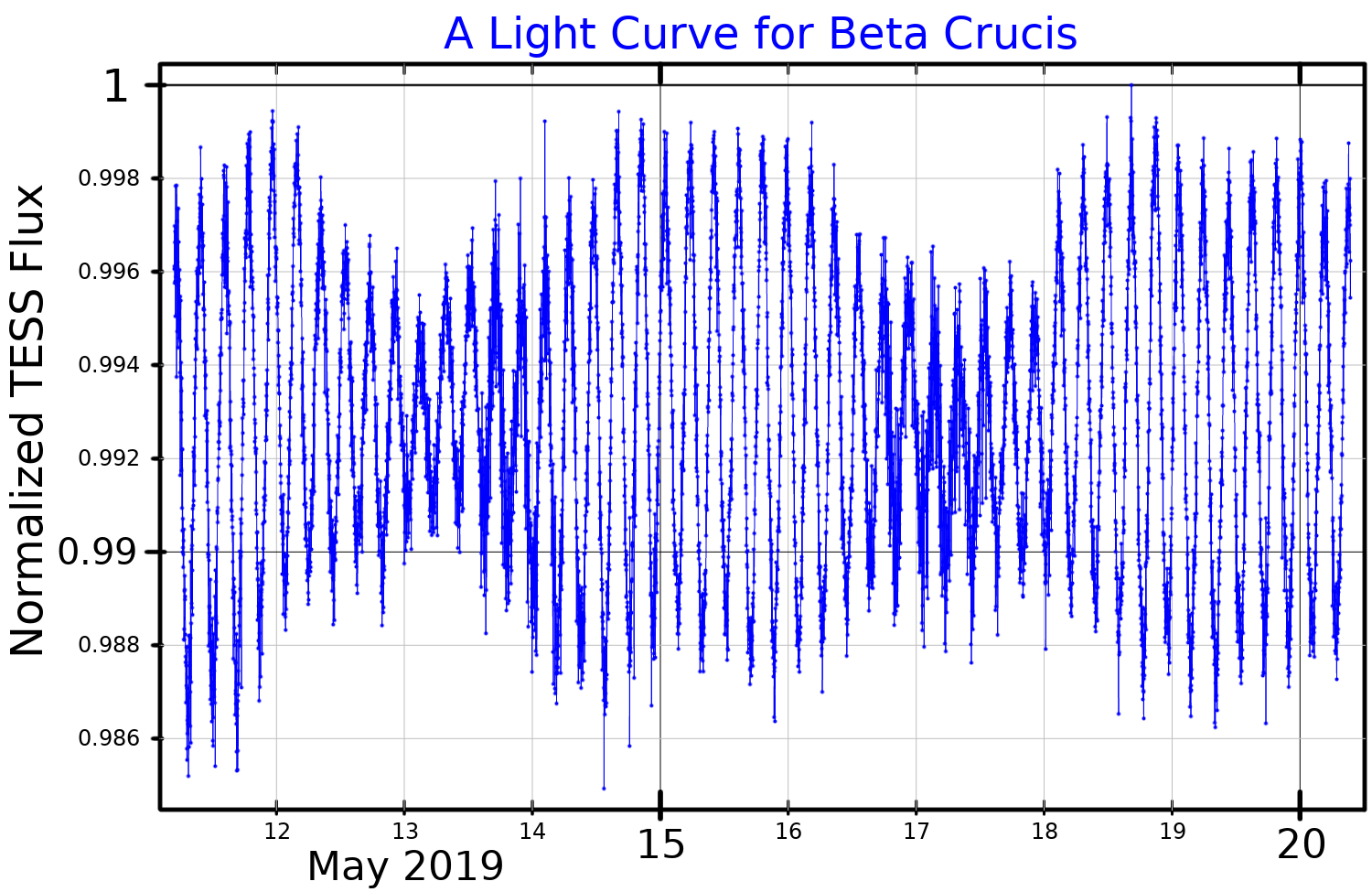
A light curve for Beta Crucis, plotted from TESS data

β Crucis A is a known β Cephei variable, although with an effective temperature of about 27,000 K it is at the hot edge of the instability strip where such stars are found. It has three different pulsation modes, none of which are radial. The periods of all three modes are in the range of 4.03–4.59 hours. The high temperature of the star's outer envelope is what gives the star the blue-white hue that is characteristic of B-type stars. It is generating a strong stellar wind and is losing about 10^{−8} M_{☉} per year, or the equivalent of the mass of the Sun every 100 million years. The wind is leaving the system with a velocity of 2,000 km s^{−1} or more.

The secondary, β Crucis B, was thought to be a main sequence star with a stellar class of B2, based on the non-detection of its spectrum, and a mass of 10 M_{☉}. Later observations by the SPHERE imager have shown it to have a mass of only 1.9 times that of the Sun. Its orbit is close to edge-on, which is not consistent with the inclination of the primary star's rotation axis; however, the position angles of both suggest that they are aligned.

In 2007, a second companion was announced, which may be a pre-main sequence star 0.78 times the Sun's mass. With the assigned designation of β Crucis D, the X-ray emission from this star was detected using the Chandra X-ray Observatory. It is likely on the post-T Tauri stage of its evolution, as opposed to the primary star which has already left the main sequence. From its common proper motion, it was confirmed to be bound to the system by a 2023 study. While its orbit has not been measured, it probably has a high inclination, and its position angle is similar to that of the inner AB pair, suggesting that both orbits are mutually aligned.

Two other stars, located at angular separations of 44 and 370 arcseconds, are likely optical companions that are not physically associated with the system. The β Crucis system may be a member of the Lower Centaurus–Crux sub-group of the Scorpius–Centaurus association. This is a stellar association of stars that share a common origin.

== In culture ==
Mimosa is represented in the flags of Australia, New Zealand, Samoa and Papua New Guinea as one of five stars making up the Southern Cross. It is also featured in the flag of Brazil, along with 26 other stars, each of which represents a state. Mimosa represents the State of Rio de Janeiro.

A vessel named MV Becrux is used to export live cattle from Australia to customers in Asia. An episode dedicated to the vessel features in the television documentary series Mighty Ships.
