= List of stars in Crux =

This is the list of notable stars in the constellation Crux, sorted by decreasing brightness.

Name	B	Var	HD	HIP	RA	Dec	vis. mag.	abs. mag.	Dist. (ly)	Sp. class	Notes
β Cru	β		111123	62434	12^{h} 47^{m} 43.32^{s}	−59° 41′ 19.4″	1.25	−3.92	352	B0.5III	Mimosa, Becrux; binary star or possibly triple star system, 20th brightest of all stars; β Cep variable, V_{max} = +1.23^{m}, V_{min} = +1.31^{m}, P = 0.2365072 d Probable high-mass member of Lower Centaurus–Crux subgroup of the Scorpius–Centaurus association.
α^{1} Cru (α Cru A)	α^{1}		108248	60718	12^{h} 26^{m} 35.94^{s}	−63° 05′ 56.6″	1.4	−3.6	321	B0.5IV	component of Acrux, 23rd brightest star, multiple star, spectroscopic binary. Possible member Lower Centaurus–Crux subgroup of the Scorpius–Centaurus association (debated).
γ Cru	γ		108903	61084	12^{h} 31^{m} 09.93^{s}	−57° 06′ 45.2″	1.60	−0.56	88	M4III	Gacrux, SRV, V_{max} = +1.60^{m}, V_{min} = +1.67^{m}
α^{2} Cru (α Cru B)	α^{2}		108249		12^{h} 26^{m} 36.50^{s}	−63° 05′ 58.0″	2.09	−2.88	321	B1V	component of Acrux. Possible member Lower Centaurus–Crux subgroup of the Scorpius–Centaurus association (debated).
δ Cru	δ		106490	59747	12^{h} 15^{m} 08.76^{s}	−58° 44′ 56.0″	2.79	−2.45	364	B2IV	Imai, β Cep variable; V_{max} = +2.78^{m}, V_{min} = +2.80^{m}, P = 0.151038 d Member of the Lower Centaurus–Crux subgroup of the Scorpius–Centaurus association.
ε Cru	ε		107446	60260	12^{h} 21^{m} 21.81^{s}	−60° 24′ 04.9″	3.59	−0.63	228	K3/K4III	Ginan, suspected variable
μ^{1} Cru	μ^{1}		112092	63003	12^{h} 54^{m} 35.66^{s}	−57° 10′ 40.4″	4.03	−1.29	377	B2IV-V	binary star; suspected variable; Member of the Lower Centaurus–Crux subgroup of the Scorpius–Centaurus association.
ζ Cru	ζ		106983	60009	12^{h} 18^{m} 26.29^{s}	−64° 00′ 11.0″	4.06	−1.16	361	B2.5V	double star, Member of the Lower Centaurus–Crux subgroup of the Scorpius–Centaurus association.
η Cru	η		105211	59072	12^{h} 06^{m} 52.85^{s}	−64° 36′ 49.1″	4.14	2.67	64	F2III	double star
θ^{1} Cru	θ^{1}		104671	58758	12^{h} 03^{m} 01.70^{s}	−63° 18′ 46.6″	4.32	0.08	230	Am	spectroscopic binary
HD 110956			110956	62327	12^{h} 46^{m} 22.75^{s}	−56° 29′ 19.6″	4.62	−0.80	396	B3V	double star; suspected slow irregular variable; Member of the Lower Centaurus–Crux subgroup of the Scorpius–Centaurus association.
λ Cru	λ		112078	63007	12^{h} 54^{m} 39.22^{s}	−59° 08′ 48.0″	4.62	−0.59	360	B4Vn	β Cep variable, ΔV = 0.02^{m}, P = 0.3951 d, Member of the Lower Centaurus–Crux subgroup of the Scorpius–Centaurus association.
ι Cru	ι		110829	62268	12^{h} 45^{m} 37.92^{s}	−60° 58′ 52.2″	4.69	1.78	125	K1III	optical double
θ^{2} Cru	θ^{2}		104841	58867	12^{h} 04^{m} 19.24^{s}	−63° 09′ 56.6″	4.72	−2.10	753	B2IV	spectroscopic binary; β Cep variable, V_{max} = +4.70^{m}, V_{min} = +4.74^{m}, P = 0.0889 d
α Cru C			108250		12^{h} 26^{m} 30.90^{s}	−63° 07′ 21.0″	4.86		348±5	B4IV	probable optical double with the α Cru system; suspected variable
CH Cru		CH	110335	61966	12^{h} 41^{m} 56.60^{s}	−59° 41′ 08.9″	4.91	−2.60	1035	B6IV	Lumbung, γ Cas variable
μ^{2} Cru	μ^{2}		112091	63005	12^{h} 54^{m} 36.92^{s}	−57° 10′ 07.1″	5.08	−0.14	361	B5Vne	component of μ Cru system; γ Cas variable, V_{max} = +4.99^{m}, V_{min} = +5.18^{m}
HD 110432		BZ	110432	62027	12^{h} 42^{m} 50.28^{s}	−63° 03′ 31.0″	5.27	−2.12	982	B2pe	high-mass X-ray binary; γ Cas variable, V_{max} = +5.24^{m}, V_{min} = +5.45^{m}
HD 112244			112244	63117	12^{h} 55^{m} 57.14^{s}	−56° 50′ 08.9″	5.34	−3.47	1884	O9Ib	emission-line star; variable star, ΔV = 0.008^{m}, P = 2.00288 d
HD 107696			107696	60379	12^{h} 22^{m} 49.47^{s}	−57° 40′ 34.0″	5.38	0.28	342	B9V	suspected variable
BL Cru		BL	108396	60781	12^{h} 27^{m} 28.88^{s}	−58° 59′ 30.4″	5.38	−0.82	566	M4/M5III	semiregular variable, ΔV = 0.35^{m}
HD 103961			103961	58379	11^{h} 58^{m} 15.25^{s}	−56° 19′ 02.3″	5.44	−1.00	633	B8III	suspected variable, V_{max} = +5.43^{m}, V_{min} = +5.48^{m}
BG Cru		BG	108968	61136	12^{h} 31^{m} 40.34^{s}	−59° 25′ 26.1″	5.49	−3.07	1680	F5Ib-G0p	Cepheid variable, V_{max} = +5.34^{m}, V_{min} = +5.58^{m}, P = 3.3428 d
HD 103884			103884	58326	11^{h} 57^{m} 40.04^{s}	−62° 26′ 55.4″	5.59	−0.73	598	B3V	suspected variable
HD 104035			104035	58427	11^{h} 58^{m} 47.67^{s}	−64° 20′ 22.4″	5.59	−4.11	2835	A3Ib	
DS Cru		DS	111613	62732	12^{h} 51^{m} 17.98^{s}	−60° 19′ 47.2″	5.71	−4.10	2991	A2Iab	emission-line star; α Cyg variable
HD 111904			111904	62894	12^{h} 53^{m} 21.90^{s}	−60° 19′ 42.6″	5.75	−4.71	4025	B9Ia	suspected variable, V_{max} = +5.70^{m}, V_{min} = +6.80^{m}
HD 108732			108732	60969	12^{h} 29^{m} 54.19^{s}	−56° 31′ 29.9″	5.78	−0.40	562	M1III	variable star, ΔV = 0.010^{m}, P = 196.46365 d
HD 106068			106068	59517	12^{h} 12^{m} 21.99^{s}	−62° 57′ 02.8″	5.91	−4.96	4866	B9Ia	suspected variable, ΔV = 0.02^{m}
HD 107543			107543	60308	12^{h} 21^{m} 57.44^{s}	−56° 22′ 27.8″	5.91	−2.73	1743	K4III + (F)	variable star, ΔV = 0.007^{m}, P = 11.23596 d
HD 104933			104933	58921	12^{h} 04^{m} 57.25^{s}	−60° 58′ 05.7″	5.95	−0.59	661	M2III	suspected variable
HD 109000			109000	61158	12^{h} 31^{m} 56.15^{s}	−63° 30′ 21.2″	5.96	1.62	240	A8III	
κ Cru	κ		111973	62931	12^{h} 53^{m} 48.92^{s}	−60° 22′ 34.5″	5.98	−2.55	1661	B5Ia	member of the Jewel Box star cluster (note that κ Cru usually refers to the cluster itself); variable star, ΔV = 0.014^{m}, P = 9.53562 d
HD 110506			110506	62058	12^{h} 43^{m} 09.21^{s}	−56° 10′ 34.3″	5.99	0.47	414	B9Vn	Member of the Lower Centaurus–Crux subgroup of the Scorpius–Centaurus association.
HD 108355			108355	60771	12^{h} 27^{m} 24.85^{s}	−63° 47′ 20.3″	6.02	−0.50	657	B8IV	
HD 108501			108501	60851	12^{h} 28^{m} 19.31^{s}	−64° 20′ 27.5″	6.05	1.11	317	A0Vn	
HD 110461			110461	62026	12^{h} 42^{m} 49.80^{s}	−55° 56′ 49.1″	6.06	0.77	372	B9V	Member of the Lower Centaurus–Crux subgroup of the Scorpius–Centaurus association.
HD 105841			105841	59396	12^{h} 11^{m} 05.25^{s}	−61° 16′ 38.6″	6.08	1.34	290	F0III	
HD 108570			108570	60870	12^{h} 28^{m} 33.84^{s}	−56° 24′ 26.2″	6.15	3.02	138	K0/K1III	
HD 104430			104430	58642	12^{h} 01^{m} 29.26^{s}	−57° 30′ 13.5″	6.16	1.28	309	A1V	
DL Cru		DL	106343	59678	12^{h} 14^{m} 16.93^{s}	−64° 24′ 30.7″	6.20	−7.66	~20000	B1.5Ia	α Cyg variable
HD 108530			108530	60861	12^{h} 28^{m} 25.71^{s}	−61° 47′ 41.4″	6.21	0.31	494	K2III	
HD 105437			105437	59200	12^{h} 08^{m} 24.74^{s}	−60° 50′ 49.7″	6.22	−2.89	2159	K3/K4II	
HD 109492			109492	61443	12^{h} 35^{m} 29.79^{s}	−61° 50′ 29.0″	6.22	2.89	151	G4IV	
HD 104900			104900	58910	12^{h} 04^{m} 45.29^{s}	−59° 15′ 11.7″	6.30	1.12	354	B9Vn	
HD 108395			108395	60780	12^{h} 27^{m} 28.84^{s}	−58° 18′ 59.3″	6.35	−0.79	874	K4III	
HD 104111			104111	58469	11^{h} 59^{m} 25.62^{s}	−62° 49′ 51.4″	6.36	−5.85	9022	A8II	
HD 110532			110532	62084	12^{h} 43^{m} 28.40^{s}	−58° 54′ 09.9″	6.41	−0.14	667	K0/K1III	double star
γ Cru B	γ		108925		12^{h} 31^{m} 16.70^{s}	−57° 04′ 52.0″	6.42			A3V	component of the γ Cru system
T Cru		T	107447	60259	12^{h} 21^{m} 21.13^{s}	−62° 16′ 53.9″	6.58		4000	G2Ib	Cepheid variable, V_{max} = +6.32^{m}, V_{min} = +6.83^{m}, P = 6.73331 d
S Cru		S	112044	62986	12^{h} 54^{m} 22.00^{s}	−58° 25′ 50.2″	6.58		2300	F7Ib-II	Cepheid variable, V_{max} = +6.22^{m}, V_{min} = +6.92^{m}, P = 4.68997 d
R Cru		R	107805	60455	12^{h} 23^{m} 37.69^{s}	−61° 37′ 44.9″	6.90	0.94	508	F7Ib/II	Cepheid variable, V_{max} = +6.40^{m}, V_{min} = +7.23^{m}, P = 5.82575 d
HD 108147			108147	60644	12^{h} 25^{m} 46.27^{s}	−64° 01′ 19.5″	6.99	4.05	126	F9V	Tupã; has a planet (b)
AG Cru		AG	110258		12^{h} 41^{m} 25.98^{s}	−59° 47′ 38.8″	7.90			F8Ib-II	Cepheid variable, V_{max} = +7.73^{m}, V_{min} = +8.58^{m}, P = 3.83728 d
HD 106906			106906	59960	12^{h} 17^{m} 53.19^{s}	−55° 58′ 31.89″	7.8		300	F5V	has a planet (b)
BH Cru		BH		59844	12^{h} 16^{m} 16.79^{s}	−56° 17′ 09.6″	7.96		8200	SC4.5-7/8e	Mira variable, V_{max} = +6.6^{m}, V_{min} = +9.8^{m}, P = 530 d
X Cru		X	110945		12^{h} 46^{m} 22.27^{s}	−59° 07′ 29.1″	8.10			G1Ib	Cepheid variable, V_{max} = +8.1^{m}, V_{min} = +8.7^{m}, P = 6.21997 d
W Cru		W	105998	59483	12^{h} 11^{m} 59.16^{s}	−58° 47′ 00.7″	8.44			G2Iab	β Lyr variable
AB Cru		AB	106871	59935	12^{h} 17^{m} 37.12^{s}	−58° 09′ 52.4″	8.48		3900	B2IVe	Algol variable
AI Cru		AI		59026	12^{h} 06^{m} 07.69^{s}	−61° 15′ 24.8″	9.68		2300	F7Ib-II	Algol variable
GX 301-2		BP			12^{h} 26^{m} 37.56^{s}	−62° 46′ 13.2″	10.66			B1.2Ia	High-mass X-ray binary, V_{max} = +10.4^{m}, V_{min} = +10.92^{m}, P = 41.487 d
WR 46		DI	104994	58954	12^{h} 05^{m} 18.72^{s}	−62° 03′ 10.1″	10.8	−2.25	13000	WN3p	Wolf–Rayet star, V_{max} = +10.49^{m}, V_{min} = +11.00^{m}
HDE 311884		CD	311884		12^{h} 43^{m} 51.00^{s}	−63° 45′ 14.8″	10.81		911	WN6o + O5V	Wolf–Rayet star, ΔV = 0.11^{m}, P = 6.24 d
NGC 4349-127					12^{h} 24^{m} 35.47^{s}	−61° 49′ 11.7″	10.82		6500	KIII	has a planet
BI Cru		BI			12^{h} 23^{m} 25.99^{s}	−62° 38′ 16.1″	11.00			B+....	Symbiotic star, V_{max} = +11.0^{m}, V_{min} = +14.0^{m}
Table legend: • Name = Proper name • B = Bayer designation • F or/and G. = Flamsteed designation or Gould designation • Var = Variable-star designation • HD = Henry Draper Catalogue designation number • HIP = Hipparcos Catalogue designation number • RA = Right ascension for the Epoch/Equinox J2000.0 • Dec = Declination for the Epoch/Equinox J2000.0 • vis. mag. = visual magnitude (m or m_{v}), also known as apparent magnitude • abs. mag. = absolute magnitude (M_{v}) • Dist. (ly) = Distance in light-years from Earth • Sp. class = Spectral class of the star in the stellar classification system • Notes = Common name(s) or alternate name(s); comments; notable properties [for example: multiple star status, range of variability if it is a variable star, exoplanets, etc.]

== See also ==
- List of star names in Crux
- List of stars by constellation
- Bandeira do Brasil: Sobre as estrelas (Portuguese)
