= Crucis =

Crucis may refer to:

== Astronomy ==
- Alpha Crucis is the brightest star in constellation Crux.
- Ampney Crucis is a village and civil parish in the Cotswolds.
- Beta Crucis is the second brightest star in the constellation Crux.
- Gamma Crucis is a red giant star in the constellation of Crux.
- Lambda Crucis is a star in the constellation Crux.
- Mu Crucis is the 7th brightest star in the constellation Crux,

== Music ==
- Crucis (band) was an Argentine band considered one of the pioneers of the Argentine progressive rock.

== Religion ==
- Ancient Mystical Order Rosæ Crucis a philosophical and humanist worldwide fraternal organization.
- Ordo Crucis is a High Church Lutheran religious society for men.
- Sign of the Cross (Signum Crucis), a ritual hand motion made by members of most but not all branches of Christianity.
- Theology of the Cross (Theologia Crucis), a term coined by the theologian Martin Luther to refer to theology which points to the cross as the only source of knowledge concerning who God is and how God saves.
- Titulus Crucis is a relic kept in the church of Santa Croce in Gerusalemme in Rome.
- Via Crucis refers to the depiction of the final hours of Jesus.

== See also ==
- Valle Crucis (disambiguation)
