= List of star names in Crux =

This is the list of the proper names for the stars in the constellation Crux. (Used modern western astronomy and uranography only)

== List ==
star	proper name	derivation
α Cru	Acrux	English (coined word)
β Cru	Mimosa	Latin
γ Cru	Gacrux	English (coined word)
δ Cru	Imai	Mursi
ε Cru	Ginan	Wardaman

== Etymologies ==
=== α Cru ===
- Acrux:

＜ coined from (en) the Alpha of Crux, the former English form of it Bayer designation, Alpha Crucis. It was invented by Elijah H. Burritt in his star atlas in 1833.

- Magalhanica:

＜ (pt) Magalhãnica, "the Magellanic", and meaning Estrela de Magalhães, "the Star of Magellan".

=== β Cru ===
- Mimosa:

＜ Latin 'actor', and may come from the flower of the same name.

- Becrux:

＜ analogy from Acrux of Alpha Crucis. It was coined from (en) the Beta of Crux, the former English form of it Bayer designation, Beta Crucis. It was invented by the editor of nautical almanac in the middle of the 20th century.

=== γ Cru ===
- Gacrux:

＜ analogy from Acrux for Alpha Crucis. It was coined from (en) the Gamma of Crux, the former English form of it Bayer designation, Gamma Crucis. It was also invented by the editor of nautical almanac in the middle of the 20th century.

- Rubidea:

＜ (Portuguese)? (Latin)? rubídea, "reddish". According to Japanese astronomer Keishin Suzuki, it was invented by John Herschel.

=== δ Cru ===
- Palida:

＜ (Portuguese) pálida, "pale".

=== ε Cru ===
- Intrometida:

＜ (Portuguese) intrometida, "obtrusive".

== See also ==
- List of stars in Crux
- List of star names
- Bandeira do Brasil: Sobre as estrelas (Portuguese)
