= DL Crucis =

Star in the constellation Crux

- Location of DL Crucis (circled)

Observation data Epoch J2000 Equinox J2000
- Constellation: Crux
- Right ascension: 12^{h} 14^{m} 16.9255^{s}
- Declination: −64° 24′ 30.662″
- Apparent magnitude (V): 6.18

Characteristics
- Spectral type: B1.5Ia
- U−B color index: −0.73
- B−V color index: 0.12
- Variable type: α Cygni

Astrometry
Radial velocity (R_{v})	-10.50 km/s
Proper motion (μ)	RA: -5.62 mas/yr Dec.: 0.15 mas/yr
Parallax (π)	0.80±0.30 mas
Distance	approx. 4,000 ly (approx. 1,300 pc)
Absolute magnitude (M_{V})	−6.9

Details
Mass	30 M_{☉}
Radius	42 R_{☉}
Luminosity	251,000 L_{☉}
Surface gravity (log g)	2.50 cgs
Temperature	20,100 K
Rotational velocity (v sin i)	43 km/s

Other designations
- DL Cru, HIP 59678, HD 106343, CD-63° 732, HR 4653, GSC 08982-04743, CPD-63° 2203, GC 16707, SAO 251803

Database references
SIMBAD	data

DL Crucis is a variable star in the constellation Crux.

== Visibility ==
DL Crucis has a visual apparent magnitude of 6.3 so it is just visible with the unaided eye in dark skies. It lies in the small southern constellation of Crux, halfway between η Crucis and ζ Crucis and close to the constellation's brightest star α Crucis. This area of sky lies within the Milky Way and close to the Coalsack Nebula.

== Properties ==
DL Crucis has a spectral type of B1.5 Ia, making it a luminous blue supergiant with a temperature over 20,000 K and 251,000 times as luminous as the sun. It has a radius around 42 times, and a mass 30 times that of the Sun.

== Variability ==
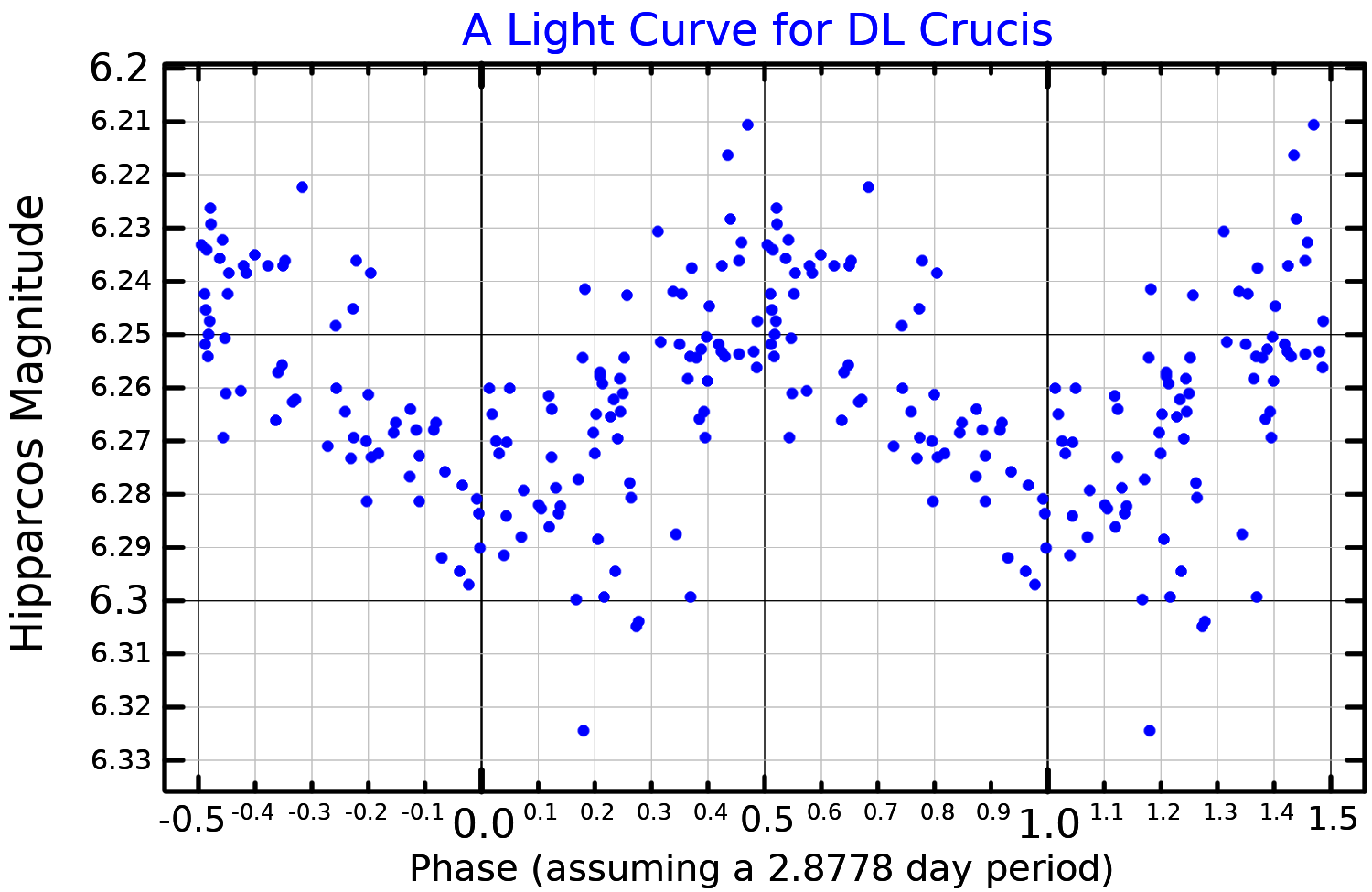
A light curve for DL Crucis, plotted from Hipparcos data

In 1977 DL Crucis, then referred to as HR 4653, was being used as a comparison star to test the variability of δ Crucis. δ Crucis turned out to be constant relative to several other stars, but the difference in brightness between it and HR 4653 changed by 0.02 magnitude. It was considered likely to be a variable with a period longer than seven hours.

Hipparcos photometry showed that DL Crucis was varying by up to 0.04 magnitude with a main period of 2 days 21 hours It was classified as an α Cygni variable. Shortly afterwards it received its variable star designation of DL Crucis.

A later detailed statistical analysis of the same data found periods of 3.650 and 3.906 days, as well as a first harmonic pulsation, with a maximum brightness range of 0.11 magnitudes.
