= Crucids =

Minor meteor shower

- Pronunciation: /ˈkruːsɪdz/
- Discovery date: 1920-1930 (Alpha Crucids) 2021 (Gamma Crucids)

Radiant
- Constellation: Crux

Properties
- Occurs during: January–February
- Date of peak: January 12- 20 (Alpha Crucids) February 14 (Gamma Crucids)
- Velocity: 55.8 km/s
- Notable features: Visibility is prominent in the Southern Hemisphere

The Crucids are a group of meteor showers associated with the constellation Crux (the Southern Cross), primarily visible in the Southern Hemisphere. The most notable showers within this group include the Alpha Crucids (α-Crucids), first recorded in the early 20th century, and the Gamma Crucids (γ-Crucids), an unexpected meteor shower discovered in 2021. The Crucids are characterized by meteors with velocities around 55.8 km/s, and are believed to be linked to Halley-type comets.

They typically occur between January and February, though activity levels vary from year to year.

== Discovery ==
The Alpha Crucids were first observed in the 1920s and 1930s by astronomers R. McIntosh and C. Hoffmeister.

The Gamma Crucids were first detected in February 2021 by low-light video camera networks in Australia, Chile, and New Zealand. Initially considered a previously unknown meteor shower, it was later designated as "IAU#1047" by the International Astronomical Union.

Observations suggest that the γ-Crucids may be linked to a Halley-type comet with a steeply inclined orbit.

== Characteristics ==
=== Velocity ===
Crucid meteors travel at relatively slow speeds, around 55.8 km/s, compared to other meteor showers.

=== Activity Period ===
==== Alpha Crucids ====
Active from January 6 to January 28, with peaks between January 12 and 20.

==== Gamma Crucids ====
First detected in mid-February 2021, with peak activity on February 14.

=== Radiant Point ===
- The α-Crucids radiate from a position near RA = 210.9°, Dec = -58.2°.
- The γ-Crucids radiate from RA = 192.6°, Dec = -56.0°.

== Observation ==
The Crucid showers are best observed from southern latitudes due to their radiant location near the celestial south pole. Their low meteor rates make them a minor shower, but occasional peaks have been observed. Lunar interference can affect visibility, especially for the α-Crucids in some years.
