= X Crucis =

Variable star in the constellation Crux

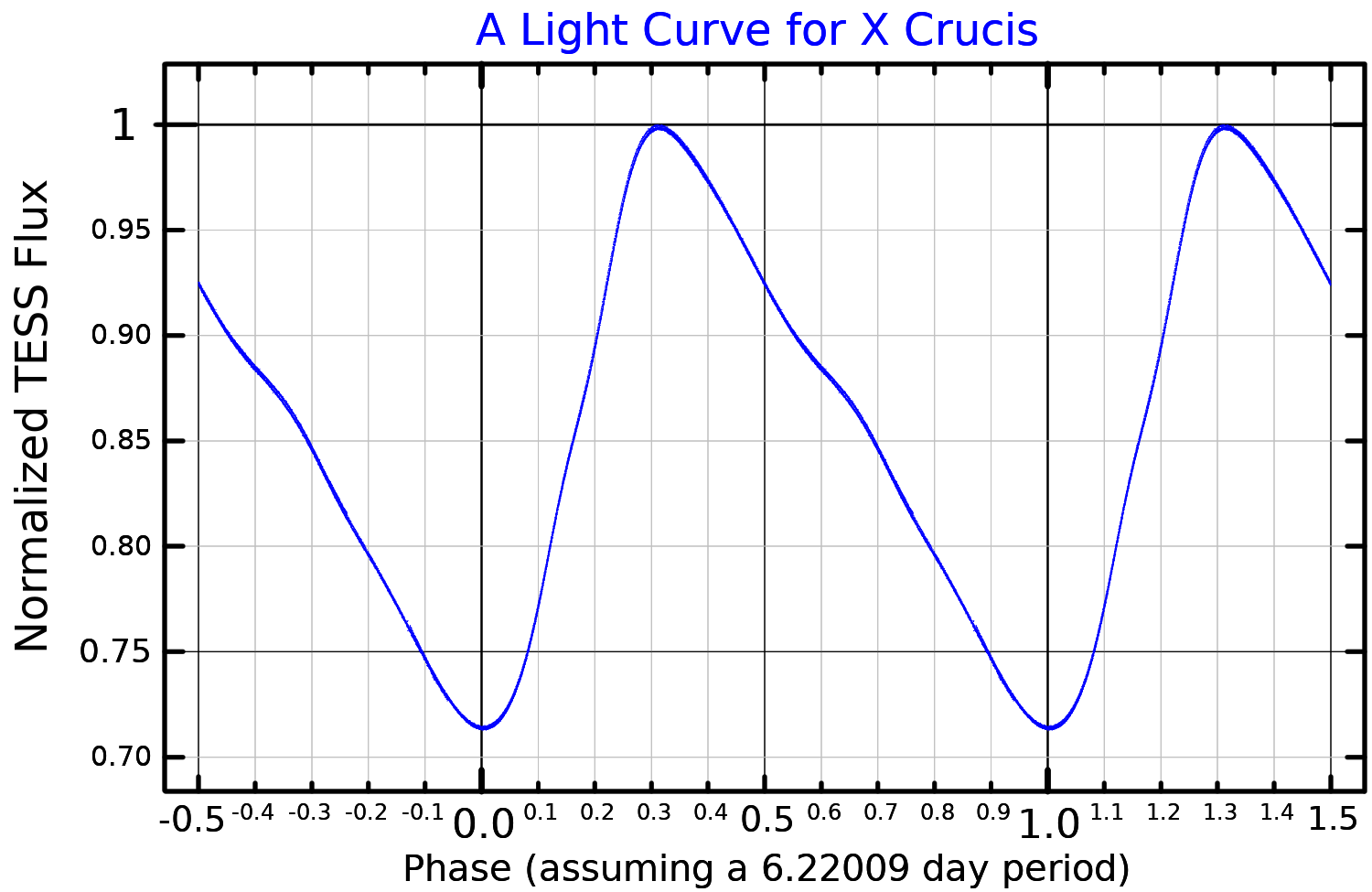
- A light curve for X Crucis, plotted from TESS data

Observation data Epoch J2000 Equinox J2000
- Constellation: Crux
- Right ascension: 12^{h} 46^{m} 22.2678^{s}
- Declination: −59° 07′ 29.120″
- Apparent magnitude (V): 8.1 - 8.7

Characteristics
- Spectral type: G1Ib
- B−V color index: +0.87
- Variable type: δ Cep

Astrometry
Radial velocity (R_{v})	-25.0 km/s
Proper motion (μ)	RA: -8.2 mas/yr Dec.: -0.9 mas/yr
Parallax (π)	0.5235±0.0459 mas
Distance	6,200 ± 500 ly (1,900 ± 200 pc)
Absolute magnitude (M_{V})	−3.9

Details
Mass	4.3 M_{☉}
Radius	50 R_{☉}
Luminosity	2,884 L_{☉}
Surface gravity (log g)	1.69 cgs
Temperature	5,180 - 6,029 K

Other designations
- X Crucis, X Cru, HD 110945, SAO 240231, CPD−58°4490, 2MASS J12462227-5907290, TYC 8659-1943-1, AN 186.1906, GCRV 63538, PPM 341282, AAVSO 1240-58, CD−58°4731, GSC 08659-01943, CPC 20 3918, HV 1298, Gaia DR2 6059764002146656128

Database references
SIMBAD	data

X Crucis is a classical Cepheid variable star in the southern constellation of Crux.

X Crucis is a pulsating variable star with am extremely regular amplitude and period. Its apparent magnitude varies from 8.1 to 8.7 every 6.22 days. This type of variable is known as a Cepheid after δ Cephei, the first example to be discovered. X Crucis is a population I star and so is a classical or type I Cepheid variable, to be distinguished from older low-mass stars called type II Cepheid variables.

Classical Cepheids pulsate radially so that their size varies. X Crucis pulsates in its fundamental mode and its properties indicate that it is crossing the instability strip for the third time as its evolves back to cooler temperatures. Its radius varies by about 5 R_{☉} during each cycle, approximately 8% of its mean radius. At the same time its temperature varies between 5,180 and 6,029 K. The radius and temperature do not vary in sync, with the smallest size occurring as the temperature is approaching its maximum. The brightness increases rapidly to a maximum when the star is hottest, then decreases more slowly. This is one of the properties that indicate fundamental mode pulsation.
