= BH Crucis =

Star in the constellation Crux

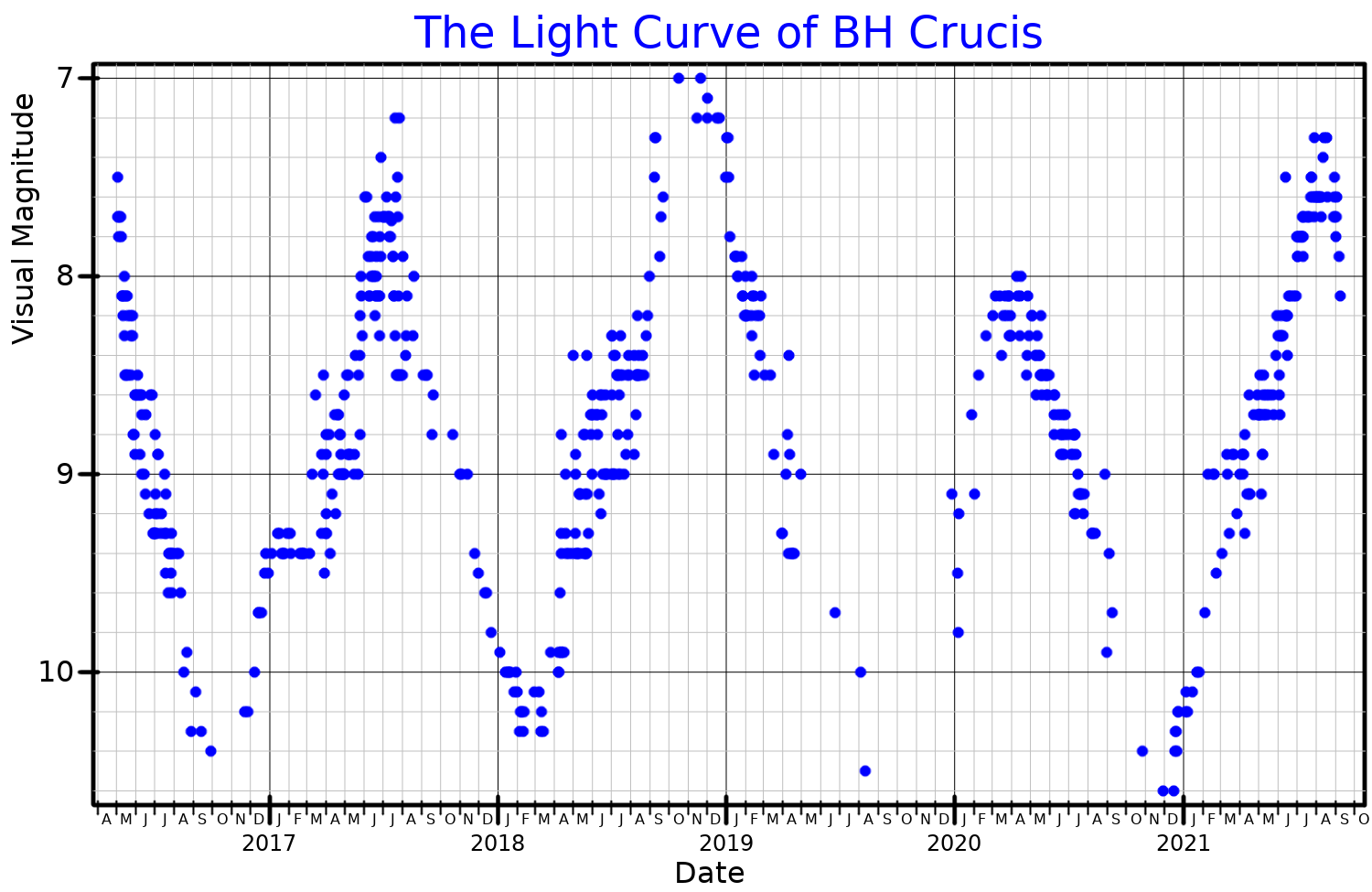
- The visual band light curve of BH Crucis, from AAVSO data

Observation data Epoch J2000.0 Equinox ICRS
- Constellation: Crux
- Right ascension: 12^{h} 16^{m} 16.7898^{s}
- Declination: −56° 17′ 09.628″
- Apparent magnitude (V): 6.55 - 10.1

Characteristics
- Evolutionary stage: AGB
- Spectral type: SC4.5/8-e - SC7/8-e (C8,2 in 2011)
- Variable type: Mira

Astrometry
Proper motion (μ)	RA: −5.009±0.065 mas/yr Dec.: −4.141±0.053 mas/yr
Parallax (π)	0.9952±0.0529 mas
Distance	3,300 ± 200 ly (1,000 ± 50 pc)
Absolute magnitude (M_{V})	−4.80

Details
Mass	2.55 M_{☉}
Radius	216 R_{☉}
Luminosity	13,700 L_{☉}
Surface gravity (log g)	−0.02 cgs
Temperature	3,000 K
Metallicity [Fe/H]	−0.14 dex

Other designations
- Welch's Red Variable, BH Cru, HIP 59844

Database references
SIMBAD	data

BH Crucis, also known as Welch's Red Variable, is a star in the constellation Crux. A long period (Mira-type) variable, its apparent magnitude ranges from 6.6 to 9.8 over 530 days. Hence at its brightest it is barely visible with the unaided eye in a rural sky. A red giant, it had been classified ranging between spectral types SC4.5/8-e and SC7/8-e, but appears to have evolved into a C-type (carbon star) spectrum by 2011.

Ronald G. Welch discovered the star while looking for new variables in October 1969. In the first thirty years since discovery, it has become redder and brighter (mean magnitude changing from 8.047 to 7.762) and its period lengthened by 25% from 421 to 530 days. Retrospective examination of photographic plates taken in South West Africa in 1937 and 1951 and stored at Sonneberg Observatory suggest the amplitude of variation might have been smaller in the earliest records. A study of the star published in 2011 found that the increase in period appeared to have stopped or even begun reversing (estimated at 524 days in 2011), and that the spectral class had changed from SC to C, with carbon emission becoming more prominent. Technetium was also recorded in the emission spectrum and its surface temperature deemed to have cooled to 3000 K. Unusually for a Mira variable, BH Crucis had a double maximum, with two peaks in brightness, reminiscent of an RV Tauri variable. However, with the lengthening of its period, this feature disappeared.

Guandalini and Cristallo calculated the luminosity of Mira variables based on their periods. Using a period of 421 days, they calculated the absolute magnitude of BH Crucis to be -4.80. Uttenthaler and colleagues calculated a bolometric magnitude of -5.59. Gaia Data Release 2 gives a parallax of 0.9952 mas and a corresponding distance of around 1000 pc.
