= BG Crucis =

Star system in the Crux constellation

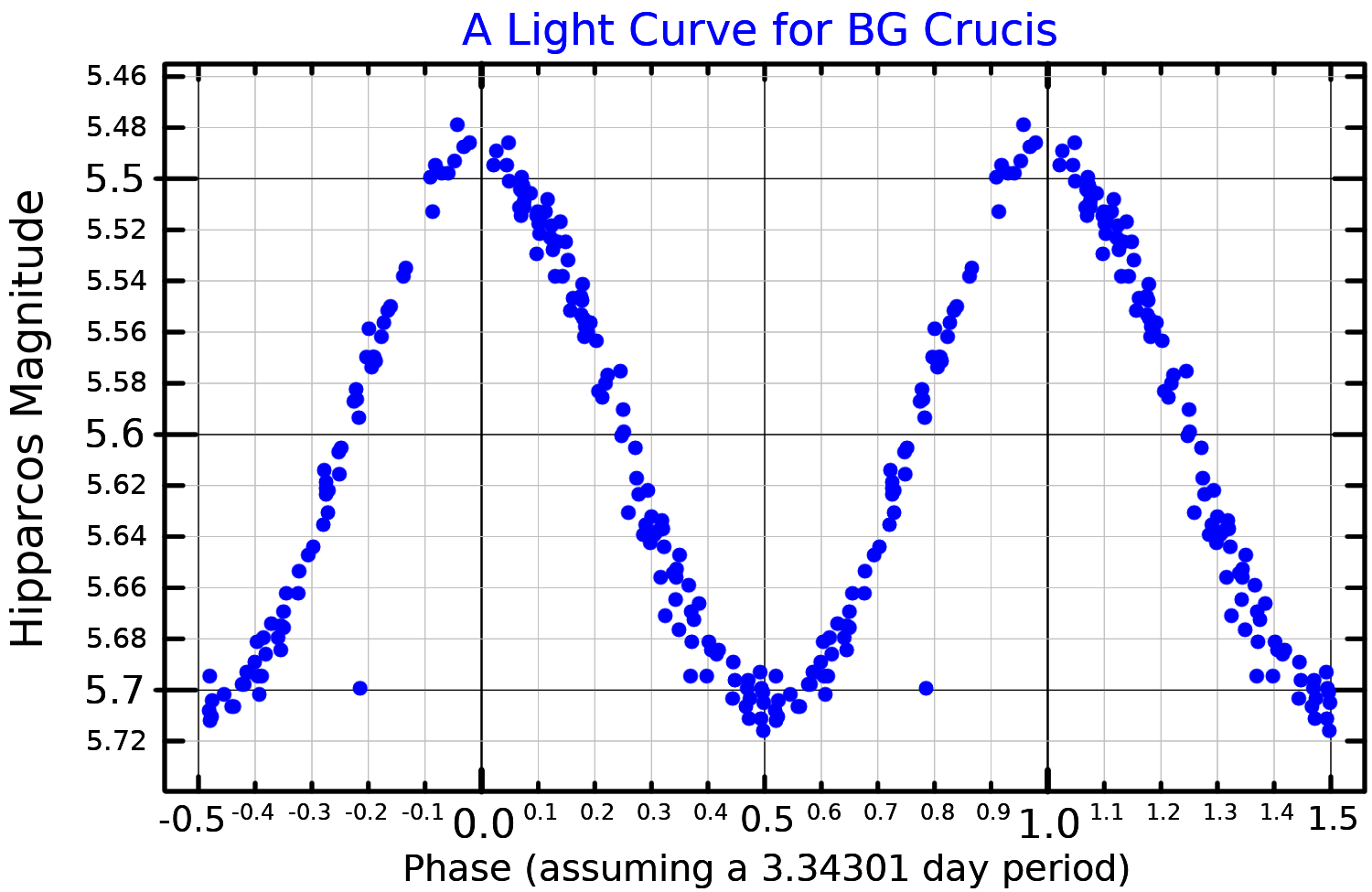
- A light curve for BG Crucis, plotted from Hipparcos data

Observation data Epoch J2000 Equinox ICRS
- Constellation: Crux
- Right ascension: 12^{h} 31^{m} 40.33011^{s}
- Declination: −59° 25′ 26.1224″
- Apparent magnitude (V): 5.34 - 5.58

Characteristics
- Spectral type: F7Ib/II (F5Ib - G0p)
- B−V color index: 0.622±0.012

Astrometry
Radial velocity (R_{v})	−19.3±2.2 km/s
Proper motion (μ)	RA: −12.689 mas/yr Dec.: −4.110 mas/yr
Parallax (π)	1.7777±0.0873 mas
Distance	1,830 ± 90 ly (560 ± 30 pc)
Absolute magnitude (M_{V})	−2.63

Details
Mass	4.3 or 6.3±0.5 M_{☉}
Radius	39.30+2.82 −3.23 R_{☉}
Luminosity	1,033.93 L_{☉}
Surface gravity (log g)	2.15 cgs
Temperature	6,253±30 K
Rotational velocity (v sin i)	22.0±1.8 km/s
Age	63.7±15.8 Myr

Other designations
- BG Cru, AAVSO 1226-58, CD−58° 4603, HD 108968, HIP 61136, HR 4768, SAO 180937, G 35 Cru

Database references
SIMBAD	data

BG Crucis is a suspected binary star system in the southern constellation of Crux. It is visible to the naked eye as a faint yellow-white hued point of light with an apparent visual magnitude of about 5. The system is located at a distance of approximately 1,830 light years from the Sun based on parallax, and is drifting closer with a radial velocity of −19 km/s.

The visible component is a supergiant star that pulsates between spectral types F5Ib and G0p. It is a small amplitude classical Cepheid variable with an apparent magnitude ranges from 5.34 down to 5.58 over a period of 3.3428 days. On the Hertzsprung–Russell diagram of temperature versus luminosity, it is located near the blue (hotter) edge of the Cepheid instability strip. Models indicate the cepheid region is relatively small in this star, so there are no shock waves produced as a result of the instability.

BG Crucis is 64 million years old with four to six times the mass of the Sun. Having exhausted the supply of hydrogen at its core, it has expanded to 39 times the Sun's radius. It is radiating over a thousand times the luminosity of the Sun from its enlarged photosphere at an effective temperature of 6,253 K.
