= S Crucis =

Variable star in the constellation Crux

Observation data Epoch J2000 Equinox J2000
- Constellation: Crux
- Right ascension: 12^{h} 54^{m} 21.99728^{s}
- Declination: −58° 25′ 50.2146″
- Apparent magnitude (V): 6.22 - 6.92

Characteristics
- Spectral type: F6-G1Ib-II
- Variable type: δ Cep

Astrometry
Radial velocity (R_{v})	−6.10 (−21.1 - 5.9) km/s
Proper motion (μ)	RA: −9.480 mas/yr Dec.: 3.987 mas/yr
Parallax (π)	1.0215±0.0448 mas
Distance	3,200 ± 100 ly (980 ± 40 pc)
Absolute magnitude (M_{V})	-3.27

Details
Radius	37.9 R_{☉}
Surface gravity (log g)	1.2 - 1.9 cgs
Temperature	5,517 - 6,482 K
Metallicity [Fe/H]	−0.07 - 0.16 dex
Age	116 Myr

Other designations
- CD−57°4766, HD 112044, HIP 62986, HR 4895, SAO 240362

Database references
SIMBAD	data

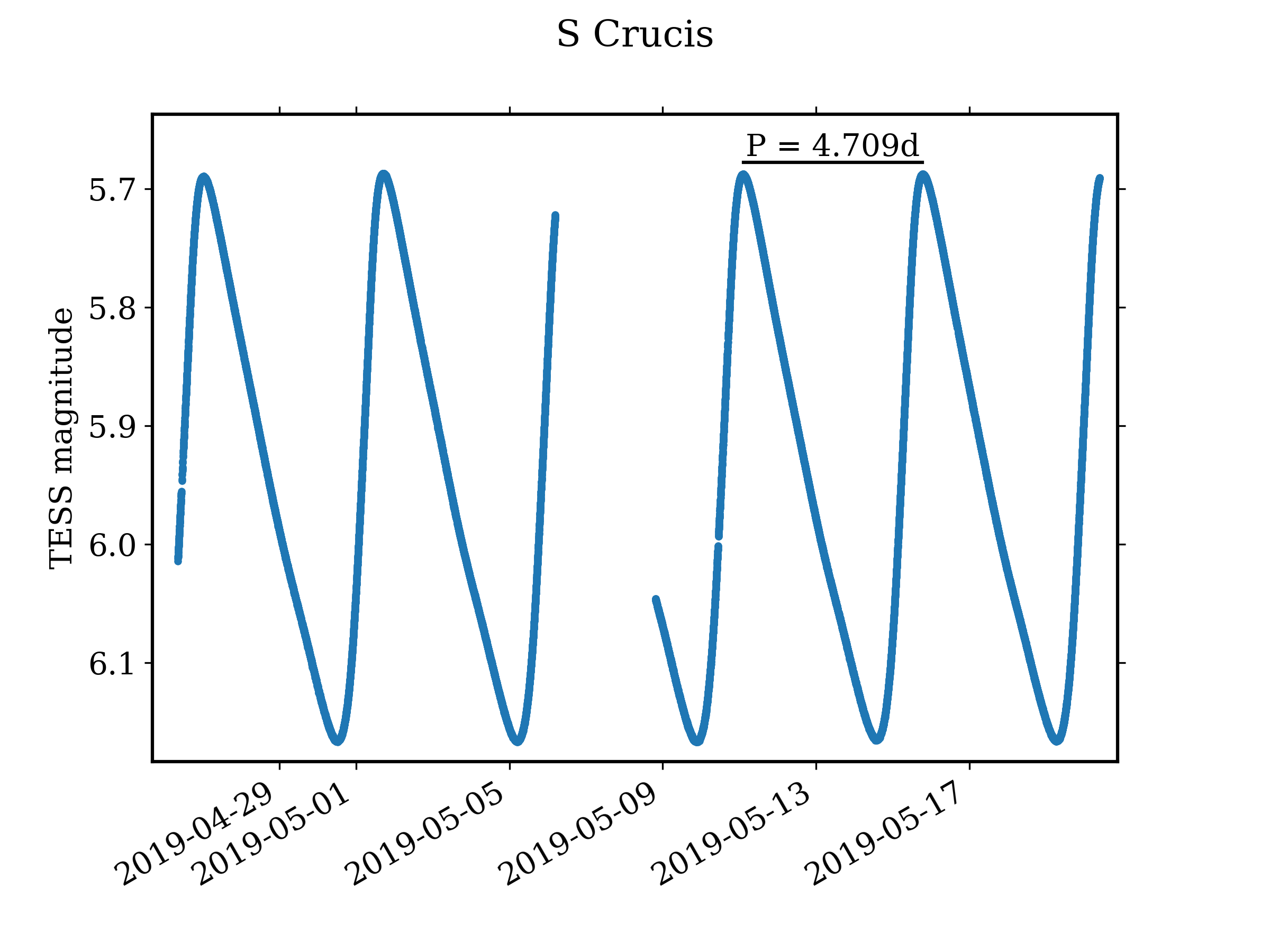
Light curve of the classical Cepheid variable S Crucis recorded by NASA's Transiting Exoplanet Survey Satellite (TESS)

S Crucis is a star in the constellation Crux. A Cepheid variable, its apparent magnitude ranges from 6.22 to 6.92 over 4.68997 d. It is a yellow-white supergiant that pulsates between spectral types F6Ib-II and G1Ib-II.

S Crucis is a pulsating variable star of the δ Cephei type, a Classical Cepheid variable. Its mean radius is 37.9 R_{☉} and that radius varies by up to 4.1 R_{☉} during its 4.7-day pulsation cycle. Over the same cycle, the effective temperature varies between 5,517 K and 6,482 K. The star is thought to be 116 million years old; it has exhausted its core hydrogen and left the main sequence.
