= Eta Crucis =

F-type star in the constellation Crux

- Location of Eta Crucis (circled)

Observation data Epoch J2000.0 Equinox ICRS
- Constellation: Crux
- Right ascension: 12^{h} 06^{m} 52.89814^{s}
- Declination: −64° 36′ 49.4305″
- Apparent magnitude (V): 4.14

Characteristics
- Evolutionary stage: main sequence
- Spectral type: F2 V
- U−B color index: +0.00
- B−V color index: +0.35

Astrometry
| Radial velocity (R_{v}) | +13.13±0.26 km/s |
| Proper motion (μ) | RA: +34.270 mas/yr Dec.: −36.902 mas/yr |
| Parallax (π) | 50.7919±0.1049 mas |
| Distance | 64.2 ± 0.1 ly (19.69 ± 0.04 pc) |
| Absolute magnitude (M_{V}) | 2.67 |

Details
| Mass | 1.51±0.04 M_{☉} |
| Radius | 1.854±0.005 R_{☉} |
| Luminosity | 6.901+0.027 −0.029 L_{☉} |
| Surface gravity (log g) | 4.01±0.00 cgs |
| Temperature | 6,830 K |
| Metallicity [Fe/H] | −0.04 dex |
| Rotational velocity (v sin i) | 46.1±2.3 km/s |
| Age | 1.63±0.29 Gyr |

Other designations
- η Cru, CD−63°2145, GJ 455.2, GJ 9388, HD 105211, HIP 59072, HR 4616, SAO 251742

Database references
| SIMBAD | data |

Eta Crucis is a solitary star in the southern constellation of Crux. Its name is a Bayer designation that is Latinized from η Crucis and abbreviated Eta Cru or η Cru. This star can be seen with the naked eye, having an apparent visual magnitude of 4.14. Based upon parallax measurements, η Crucis is located at a distance of 64 light-years (20 pc). The system made its closest approach about 1.6 million years ago when it achieved perihelion at a distance of roughly 26 light years.

This is an F-type main sequence star with a stellar classification of F2 V. It has 151% of the Sun's mass, 185% of the Sun's radius and shines with 6.9 times the luminosity of the Sun from its outer atmosphere with an effective temperature of 6,830 K. It is 1.63 billion years old with a high rate of spin, showing a projected rotational velocity of 46 km/s.

Eta Crucis has a pair of visual companions. Component B is a magnitude 11.80 star located at an angular separation of 48.30″ along a position angle of 300°, as of 2010. Component C has a magnitude of 12.16 and lies at an angular separation of 35.50″ along a position angle of 194°, as of 2000.

== Debris disk ==
Image of the debris disk with the REASONS survey

A debris disk around Eta Crucis was initially inferred from observations from the Spitzer Space Telescope that showed a significant infrared excess at a wavelength of 70 μm, which was atribuited to the presence of a circumstellar disk. A further analysis of the IR excess show that the circumstellar disk around Eta Crucis is divided in a warm dust disk and a cold debris disk.

The warm disk is positioned at 13 astronomical units (AU) from Eta Crucis and has a temperature of 170 K (−103 °C). The grains that make this dust disk are millimeter-sized. It is believed this disk (and its particles) originated from both in-situ collisions of planetesimals in a region similar to the Solar System's asteroid belt and from comet delivery, where more distant planetesimals were transported to the inner region by gravitational interactions with other planets. Comet delivery could also suggest the presence of planets formed by comet interactions.

The cold disk is characterized by a narrow ring that is 24 AU wide, with an average distance of 134 AU and an inner edge of 85 AU. Its temperature is estimated at 43 K (−230.2 °C). Observations suggest the particles making up it are of large-size. An image of the cold disk was presented in 2025 as part of the REsolved ALMA and SMA Observations of Nearby Stars (REASONS) survey.

The Eta Crucis planetary system
| Companion (in order from star) | Mass | Semimajor axis (AU) | Orbital period (years) | Eccentricity | Inclination (°) | Radius |
|---|---|---|---|---|---|---|
| Warm disk | 13 AU | | | | — | — |
| Cold disk | 133.7±1.6 AU | | | | 67.0±0.7° | — |

== See also ==
- Eta Corvi, another similar star with cold and warm dust disks
