= Valle Crucis =

Valle Crucis is a Latin phrase meaning "valley of the cross", and may refer to:

- Valle Crucis Abbey, Wales, UK
- Valle Crucis, North Carolina, US
- Valle Crucis Episcopal Mission, North Carolina, US
