= T Crucis =

Variable star in the constellation Crux

Observation data Epoch J2000 Equinox J2000
- Constellation: Crux
- Right ascension: 12^{h} 21^{m} 21.12807^{s}
- Declination: −62° 16′ 53.8790″
- Apparent magnitude (V): 6.32 - 6.83

Characteristics
- Evolutionary stage: F6-G2Ib
- Variable type: δ Cep

Astrometry
Proper motion (μ)	RA: −10.915 mas/yr Dec.: −0.471 mas/yr
Parallax (π)	1.2106±0.0142 mas
Distance	2,690 ± 30 ly (826 ± 10 pc)
Absolute magnitude (M_{V})	−3.49

Details
Mass	7.2 M_{☉}
Radius	55 R_{☉}
Luminosity	2,601 L_{☉}
Surface gravity (log g)	1.52 cgs
Temperature	4,676 K
Metallicity [Fe/H]	0.09 dex
Age	57 Myr

Other designations
- CD−61°3428, HD 107447, HIP 60259, SAO 251861

Database references
SIMBAD	data

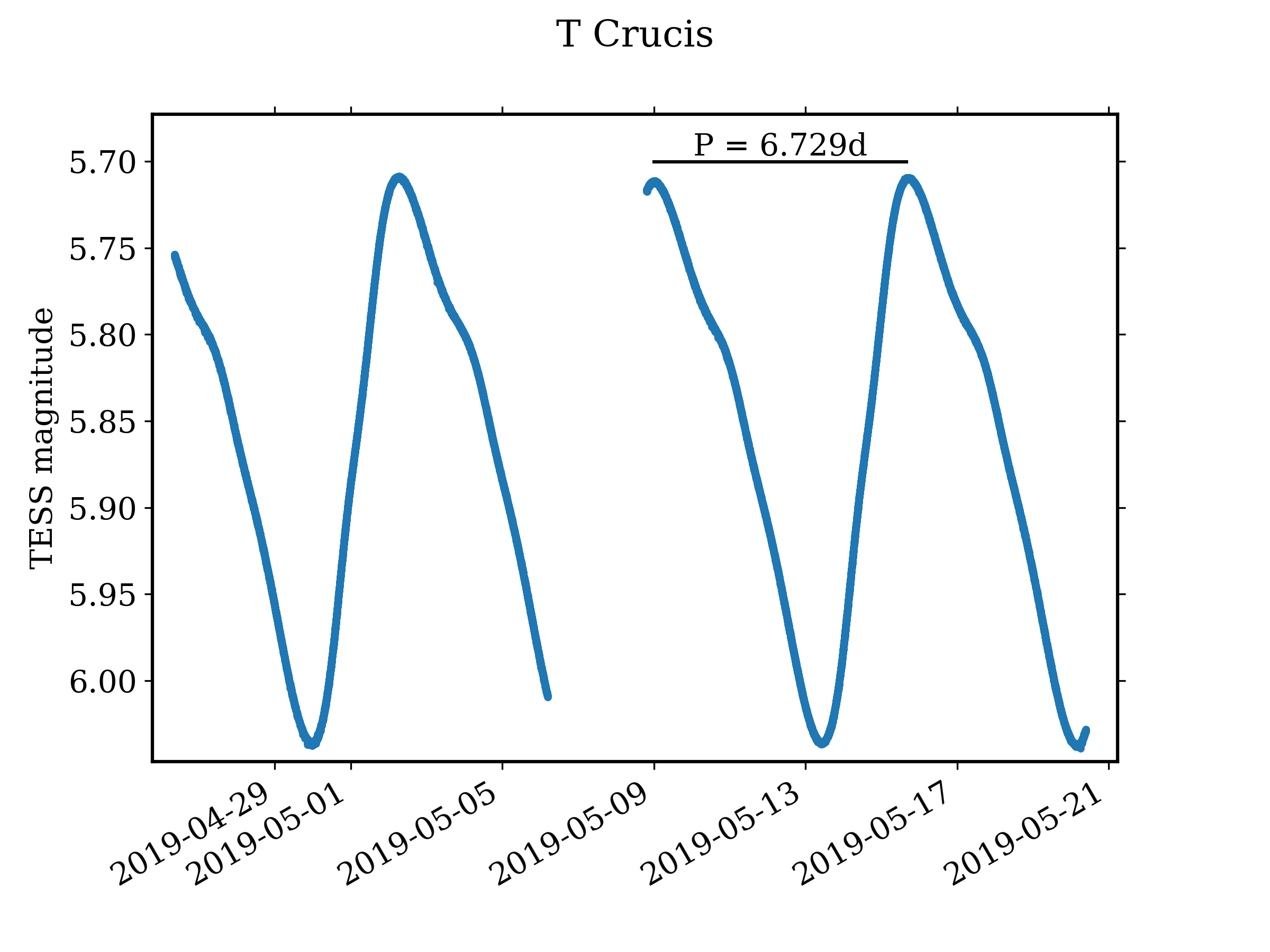
Light curve of T Crucis recorded by NASA's Transiting Exoplanet Survey Satellite (TESS)

T Crucis is a star in the constellation Crux. A Cepheid variable, its apparent magnitude ranges from 6.32 to 6.83 over 6.73331 days. It is a yellow-white supergiant that pulsates between spectral types F6Ib and G2Ib. The radius is 55 times that of the Sun.
