= R Crucis =

Variable star in the constellation Crux

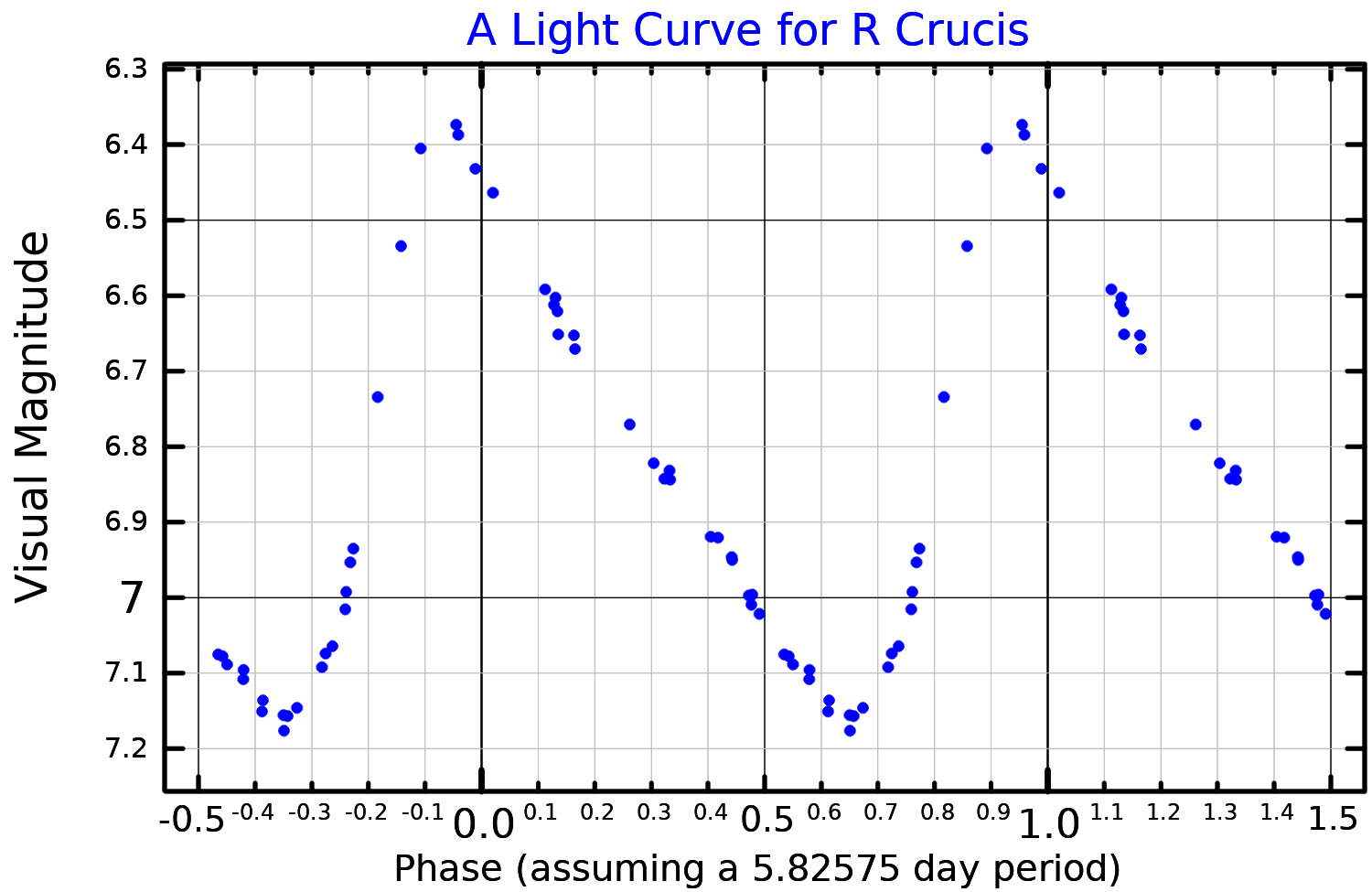
- A visual band light curve for R Crucis, adapted from Dean et al. (1977)

Observation data Epoch J2000 Equinox J2000
- Constellation: Crux
- Right ascension: 12^{h} 23^{m} 37.68840^{s}
- Declination: −61° 37′ 44.8570″
- Apparent magnitude (V): 6.40 to 7.23

Characteristics
- Spectral type: F6-G2Ib-II or F7Ib/II
- B−V color index: 0.67±0.02
- Variable type: δ Cep

Astrometry
| Radial velocity (R_{v}) | −13.5±3.0 km/s |
| Proper motion (μ) | RA: -9.404 mas/yr Dec.: −0.430 mas/yr |
| Parallax (π) | 1.98±0.54 mas |
| Distance | approx. 1,600 ly (approx. 500 pc) |

Details
| Radius | 44.6 R_{☉} |
| Surface gravity (log g) | 1.65 cgs |
| Temperature | 5,812±22 K |
| Metallicity [Fe/H] | +0.06 dex |

Other designations
- R Cru, AAVSO 1218-61, CD−60°4138, HD 107805, HIP 60455, SAO 251878

Database references
| SIMBAD | data |

R Crucis is a variable star in the southern constellation of Crux. It has a yellow-white hue and is often too faint to see with the naked eye, having an apparent visual magnitude that fluctuates between magnitudes 6.4 and 7.2. This object is located at a distance of approximately 1,600 light years from the Sun based on parallax, but it is drifting closer with a radial velocity of −13.5 km/s.

This is a Classical Cepheid, or Delta Cephei variable, that ranges in brightness from visual magnitude 6.40 down to 7.23 with a period of 5.82575 days. It is a supergiant star with a stellar classification that varies over each pulsation cycle, giving it a class range of F6-G2Ib-II. The star has a mean radius 44.6 times the radius of the Sun (44.6 R_{☉}), but the radius varies by 5 R_{☉} during each pulsation. It has a near solar metallicity and the atmospheric abundances indicate it is likely past first dredge-up.

A candidate companion star has been detected at an angular separation of 7.6″, which corresponds to a projected separation of 6,330 AU. The Hubble WFC3 shows a closer companion at a separation of 1.9″. The system is a source for X-ray emission but the contributing component is unclear.
