= Theta2 Crucis =

Star in the constellation Crux

θ^{2} Crucis
- Location of θ^{2} Crucis (circled in red)

Observation data Epoch J2000 Equinox ICRS
- Constellation: Crux
- Right ascension: 12^{h} 04^{m} 19.22008^{s}
- Declination: −63° 09′ 56.5167″
- Apparent magnitude (V): 4.70 to 4.74

Characteristics
- Spectral type: B3 V
- U−B color index: −0.61
- B−V color index: −0.08
- Variable type: β Cep

Astrometry
Radial velocity (R_{v})	+16.3 km/s
Proper motion (μ)	RA: −18.467 mas/yr Dec.: +0.467 mas/yr
Parallax (π)	4.7314±0.1276 mas
Distance	690 ± 20 ly (211 ± 6 pc)
Absolute magnitude (M_{V})	−2.35

Orbit
Period (P)	3.428 d
Eccentricity (e)	0.00
Periastron epoch (T)	2419604.367 JD
Semi-amplitude (K_{1}) (primary)	51.3 km/s

Details
Mass	5.9 M_{☉}
Radius	6.9 R_{☉}
Luminosity	1,935 L_{☉}
Surface gravity (log g)	3.55 cgs
Temperature	15,361 K
Metallicity [Fe/H]	+0.20 dex
Rotational velocity (v sin i)	23 km/s
Age	18.5 Myr

Other designations
- θ^{2} Cru, CD−62°610, HD 104841, HIP 58867, HR 4603, SAO 251717

Database references
SIMBAD	data

Theta^{2} Crucis is a spectroscopic binary star system in the southern constellation of Crux. Its name is a Bayer designation that is Latinized from θ^{2} Crucis and abbreviated Theta^{2} Cru or θ^{2} Cru. This pair of stars complete an orbit every 3.4280 days and they have a low orbital eccentricity that is close to 0.0. Theta^{2} Crucis is located at a distance of about 690 light-years from the Sun. It is drifting further away with a line of sight velocity component of +16 km/s.

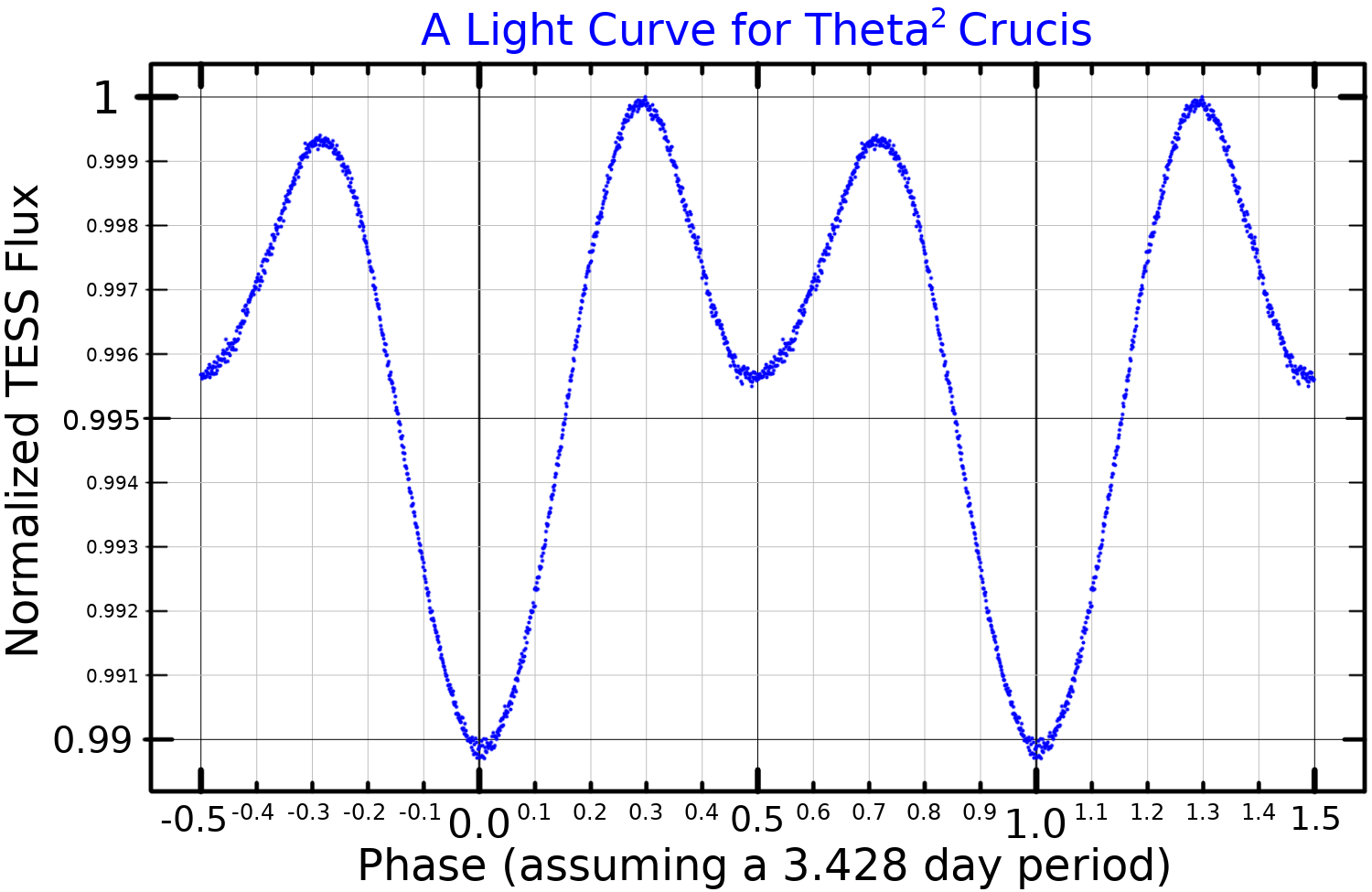
A light curve for Theta^{2} Crucis, plotted from TESS data

Since a member of the system is a β Cephei-type variable star, the apparent visual magnitude is not fixed but varies slightly between +4.70 and +4.74. The period of this variability is 0.0889 days (2.13 hours). The system is categorized as is a blue-white B-type main sequence star with a stellar classification of B3 V, although it has also been classified as a subgiant. Evolutionary models show it at a late stage of its main sequence life.
