= Iota Crucis =

Star in the constellation Crux

- Location of ι Crucis (circled in red)

Observation data Epoch J2000 Equinox ICRS
- Constellation: Crux
- Right ascension: 12^{h} 45^{m} 38.05167^{s}
- Declination: −60° 58′ 52.7563″
- Apparent magnitude (V): 4.69

Characteristics
- Spectral type: K0 III
- U−B color index: +0.93
- B−V color index: +1.05

Astrometry
| Radial velocity (R_{v}) | +7.45±0.12 km/s |
| Proper motion (μ) | RA: +112.266 mas/yr Dec.: −65.641 mas/yr |
| Parallax (π) | 26.1753±0.0952 mas |
| Distance | 124.6 ± 0.5 ly (38.2 ± 0.1 pc) |
| Absolute magnitude (M_{V}) | +1.86 |

Details
| Mass | 1.45±0.11 M_{☉} |
| Radius | 6.57±0.19 R_{☉} |
| Luminosity | 20.9±0.5 L_{☉} |
| Surface gravity (log g) | 2.920±0.149 cgs |
| Temperature | 4,815±60 K |
| Metallicity [Fe/H] | +0.148±0.038 dex |

Other designations
- ι Cru, CPD−60°4273, GC 17339, HD 110829, HIP 62268, HR 4842, SAO 252016, WDS J12456-6059A

Database references
| SIMBAD | data |

Iota Crucis is a star in the southern constellation of Crux. Its name is a Bayer designation that is Latinized from ι Crucis and abbreviated ι Cru or ι Cru. This star is visible to the naked eye as a faint, orange-hued point of light with an apparent visual magnitude of 4.69. It is located at a distance of 124.6 light-years (38.2 pc) from the Sun based on parallax measurements, and is drifting further away with a radial velocity of +7.5 km/s.

This is an aging giant star with a stellar classification of K0 III. It has 1.45 times the mass of the Sun. Having exhausted the supply of hydrogen at its core, the star has cooled and expanded off the main sequence, and now has 6.57 times the radius of the Sun. It is radiating 20.9 times the luminosity of the Sun from its swollen photosphere at an effective temperature of 4,815 K.

There is a magnitude 10.24 star named CPD-60 4273B (B8V) at an angular separation of 29.7″ from the primary, along a position angle of 2° as of 2015. The Washington Double Star Catalog (2001) notes this is an "optical pair, based on study of relative motion of the components," whereas Eggleton and Tokovinin (2008) list it as a binary system. However, astrometric measurements by the Gaia spacecraft confirm the companion is not gravitationally bound, with a measured parallax of 1.1416±0.0162 mas implying a distance around 876 pc (2,860 ly), as well as radically different proper motions.
