= Zeta Crucis =

Star in the constellation Crux

- Location of ζ Crucis (circled in red)

Observation data Epoch J2000 Equinox ICRS
- Constellation: Crux
- Right ascension: 12^{h} 18^{m} 26.24075^{s}
- Declination: −64° 00′ 11.1073″
- Apparent magnitude (V): 4.04

Characteristics
- Evolutionary stage: main sequence
- Spectral type: B2.5V
- U−B color index: −0.68
- B−V color index: −0.17

Astrometry
Radial velocity (R_{v})	+15.8 km/s
Proper motion (μ)	RA: −37.431 mas/yr Dec.: −6.576 mas/yr
Parallax (π)	9.2402±0.1928 mas
Distance	353 ± 7 ly (108 ± 2 pc)
Absolute magnitude (M_{V})	−1.13

Details
Mass	6.4±0.1 M_{☉}
Radius	3.7 R_{☉}
Luminosity	737 L_{☉}
Surface gravity (log g)	3.99 cgs
Temperature	18,155 K
Rotational velocity (v sin i)	115 km/s
Age	19.8 Myr

Other designations
- ζ Cru, CPD−63°2235, HD 106983, HIP 60009, HR 4679, SAO 251841

Database references
SIMBAD	data

Zeta Crucis is a binary star system in the southern constellation of Crux. Its name is a Bayer designation that is Latinized from ζ Crucis and abbreviated ζ Cru or ζ Cru. This system is visible to the naked eye as a point of light with an apparent visual magnitude of 4.06^{m}. Based on parallax measurements, ζ Crucis is located at a distance of about 353 light-years (108 pc) from the Sun. It is a member of the Lower Centaurus–Crux subgroup of the Scorpius–Centaurus association.

This is a double-lined spectroscopic binary star system. The spectrum matches a B-type main-sequence star with a stellar classification of B2.5 V. It displays pulsational behavior matching a slowly pulsating B-type star and Beta Cephei variable. There is a faint visual companion with an apparent magnitude of 12.49.

A K-type companion star has an angular separation of 0.15″. This corresponds to a projected separation of about 20 au that would yield an orbital period of around 20 years. A common proper motion companion of type M2 is at a separation of around 11′. This would correspond to a projected separation of 60,000 au. It is about 1.5 magnitudes brighter than expected for its temperature, so it is most likely a pre-main-sequence star.
