= Mu Crucis =

Star in the constellation Crux

- Location of μ Crucis (circled in red)

Observation data Epoch J2000 Equinox ICRS
- Constellation: Crux
- μ^{1} Crucis
- Right ascension: 12^{h} 54^{m} 35.6249^{s}
- Declination: −57° 10′ 40.527″
- Apparent magnitude (V): 4.03
- μ^{2} Crucis
- Right ascension: 12^{h} 54^{m} 36.8865^{s}
- Declination: −57° 10′ 07.214″
- Apparent magnitude (V): 5.19

Characteristics

μ^{1} Cru
- Evolutionary stage: subgiant
- Spectral type: B2IV-V
- U−B color index: −0.75
- B−V color index: −0.17

μ^{2} Cru
- Spectral type: B5Vne
- U−B color index: −0.50
- B−V color index: −0.11

Astrometry

μ^{1} Cru
Radial velocity (R_{v})	+13.9 km/s
Proper motion (μ)	RA: −30.45 mas/yr Dec.: −13.55 mas/yr
Parallax (π)	9.6267±0.3611 mas
Distance	370+23 −20 ly (113+7 −6 pc)
Absolute magnitude (M_{V})	−1.49

μ^{2} Cru
Radial velocity (R_{v})	+13 km/s
Proper motion (μ)	RA: −32.35 mas/yr Dec.: −10.93 mas/yr
Parallax (π)	8.9486±0.2264 mas
Distance	364 ± 9 ly (112 ± 3 pc)
Absolute magnitude (M_{V})	−0.40

Details

μ^{1} Cru
Mass	7.0±0.1 M_{☉}
Radius	3.3±0.2 R_{☉}
Luminosity	1,740+170 −150 L_{☉}
Surface gravity (log g)	4.25±0.05 cgs
Temperature	20,500±250 K
Metallicity [Fe/H]	−0.21 dex
Rotational velocity (v sin i)	31.3±0.2 km/s
Age	9.5+5.6 −5.3 Myr

μ^{2} Cru
Mass	5.0 M_{☉}
Radius	3.9 R_{☉}
Luminosity	205 L_{☉}
Surface gravity (log g)	3.40 cgs
Temperature	20,400 K
Rotational velocity (v sin i)	210 km/s
Age	15.9 Myr

Other designations
- μ Cru, CCDM 12546-5711, WD 12546-5711
- μ^{1} Cru: CD−56°4688, HD 112092, HIP 63003, HR 4898, SAO 240366
- μ^{2} Cru: CD−56°4689, HD 112091, HIP 63005, HR 4899, SAO 240367

Database references
SIMBAD	μ Cru
- μ^{1} Cru
- μ^{2} Cru

Mu Crucis is a double star in the southern constellation of Crux, which is commonly known as the Southern Cross. Its name is a Bayer designation that is Latinized from μ Crucis and abbreviated Mu Cru or μ Cru. μ Crucis is a wide pair of spectral class B stars, magnitude 4.0 and 5.2 respectively, forming the seventh-brightest star in the constellation. They lie about 370 light-years away, and both stars are likely physically attached. The brighter component is known as μ^{1} Crucis or μ Crucis A, while the fainter is μ^{2} Crucis or μ Crucis B.

μ^{1} Crucis is the brighter of the two stars with an apparent magnitude of 4.0. It is a hot massive main sequence or subgiant star, over a thousand times as luminous as the sun.

μ^{2} Crucis is the fainter of the pair. Its apparent magnitude is 5.2 and it is a Be star, a star spinning so quickly that it has ejected a disc of material that creates emission lines in its spectrum. The disc is inclined at 36° to our line of sight.
