= Epsilon Crucis =

Star in the constellation Crux

- Location of ε Crucis (circled)

Observation data Epoch J2000.0 Equinox ICRS
- Constellation: Crux
- Right ascension: 12^{h} 21^{m} 21.608^{s}
- Declination: −60° 24′ 04.13″
- Apparent magnitude (V): 3.58

Characteristics
- Spectral type: K3 III
- Apparent magnitude (B): 4.98±0.01
- Apparent magnitude (G): 3.1
- Apparent magnitude (J): 1.226±0.274
- U−B color index: +1.63
- B−V color index: +1.42
- Variable type: suspected

Astrometry
Radial velocity (R_{v})	−4.60 km/s
Proper motion (μ)	RA: −171.223 mas/yr Dec.: 91.795 mas/yr
Parallax (π)	14.1999±0.1070 mas
Distance	230 ± 2 ly (70.4 ± 0.5 pc)
Absolute magnitude (M_{V})	−0.63±0.09

Details
Mass	(1.4 – 1.5)±0.2 M_{☉}
Radius	31±2 R_{☉}
Luminosity	282 L_{☉}
Surface gravity (log g)	1.91 cgs
Temperature	4,210±125 K
Metallicity [Fe/H]	−0.03 dex
Rotational velocity (v sin i)	3.14 km/s
Age	2.17 Gyr

Other designations
- Ginan, ε Cru, NSV 5568, CD−59°4221, FK5 2989, GC 16849, HD 107446, HIP 60260, HR 4700, SAO 251862

Database references
SIMBAD	data

Epsilon Crucis is a single, orange-hued star in the southern constellation of Crux. It has the proper name Ginan, pronounced /ˈɡiːnən/; Epsilon Crucis is its Bayer designation. Measurements made by the Gaia spacecraft showed an annual parallax shift of 14.20 mas, which provides a distance estimate of about 230 light-years (70.4 pc). The star can be seen with the naked eye, having an apparent visual magnitude of 3.58. It is moving closer to the Sun with a radial velocity of −4.60 km/s.

This is a giant star of type K with a stellar classification of K3III, indicating that it has exhausted the hydrogen at its core and evolved away from the main sequence. It is about two billion years old with 1.4–1.5 times the mass of the Sun and has expanded to 31 times the Sun's radius. The star is shining with around 282 times the Sun's luminosity from its enlarged photosphere at an effective temperature of 4,210 K.

== Nomenclature ==
ε Crucis (Latinised to Epsilon Crucis) is the star's Bayer designation, which is abbreviated Epsilon Cru or ε Cru.

The star bore the traditional name Ginan in the culture of the Wardaman people of the Northern Territory of Australia, which refers to a dilly bag – the "Bag of Songs." In 2016, the International Astronomical Union (IAU) organized a Working Group on Star Names (WGSN) to catalog and standardize proper names for stars. The WGSN approved the name Ginan for Epsilon Crucis on 19 November 2017 and it is now so included in the List of IAU-approved Star Names.

According to the WGSN's 2023 annual report, this naming was in error: Ginan is actually the Wardaman name for Alpha Crucis; the name for Epsilon Crucis is Wuja, "fire". Since the name Ginan was already approved, it will not be changed. The current IAU Catalog of Star Names (as of June 2026) does not mention this error.

It is also sometimes called Intrometida or Intrusa (intrusive) in Portuguese.

== In culture ==
Ginan is represented on the national flags of Australia, Papua New Guinea and Samoa. It is also featured in the flag of Brazil, along with 26 other stars, each of which represents a state. It represents the State of Espírito Santo.

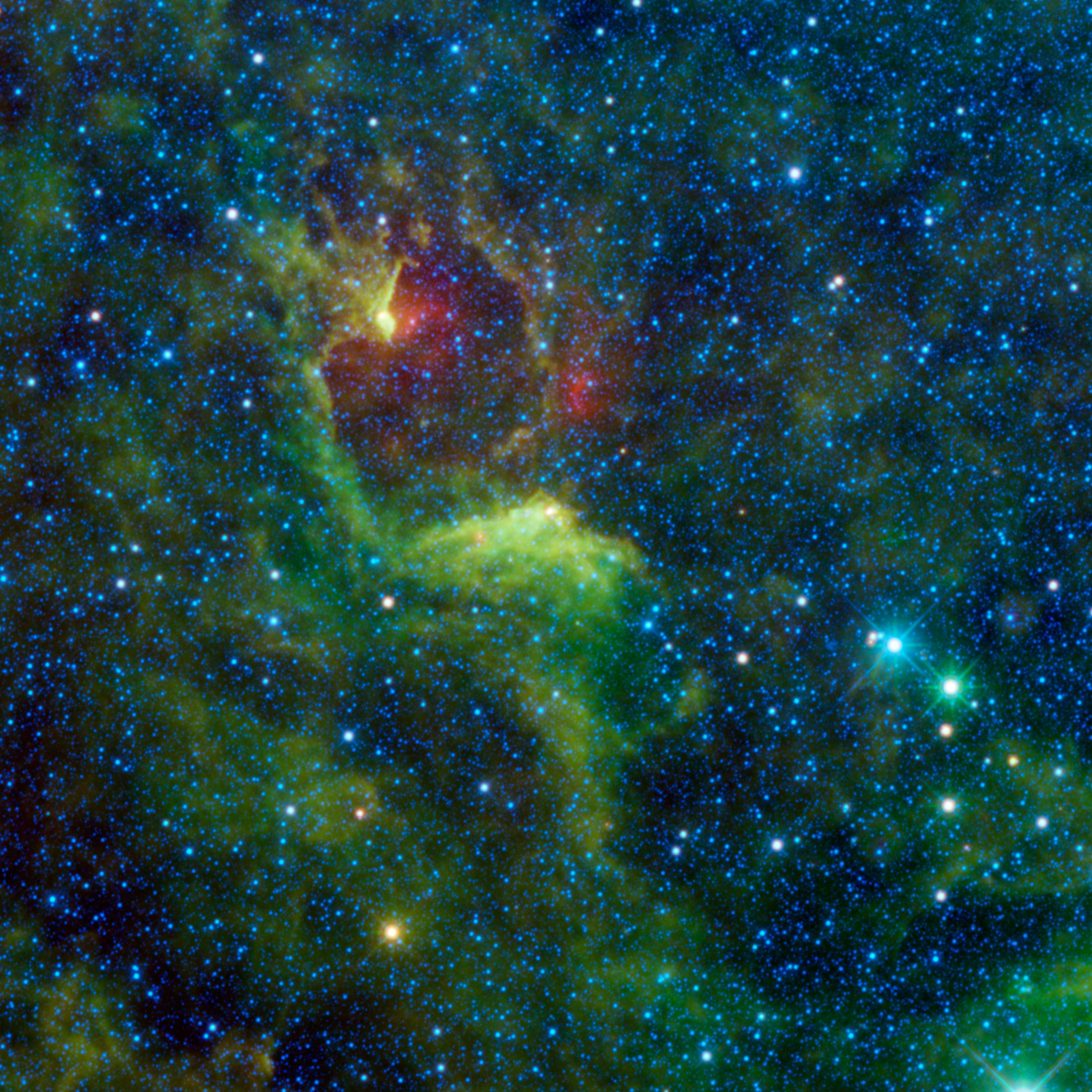
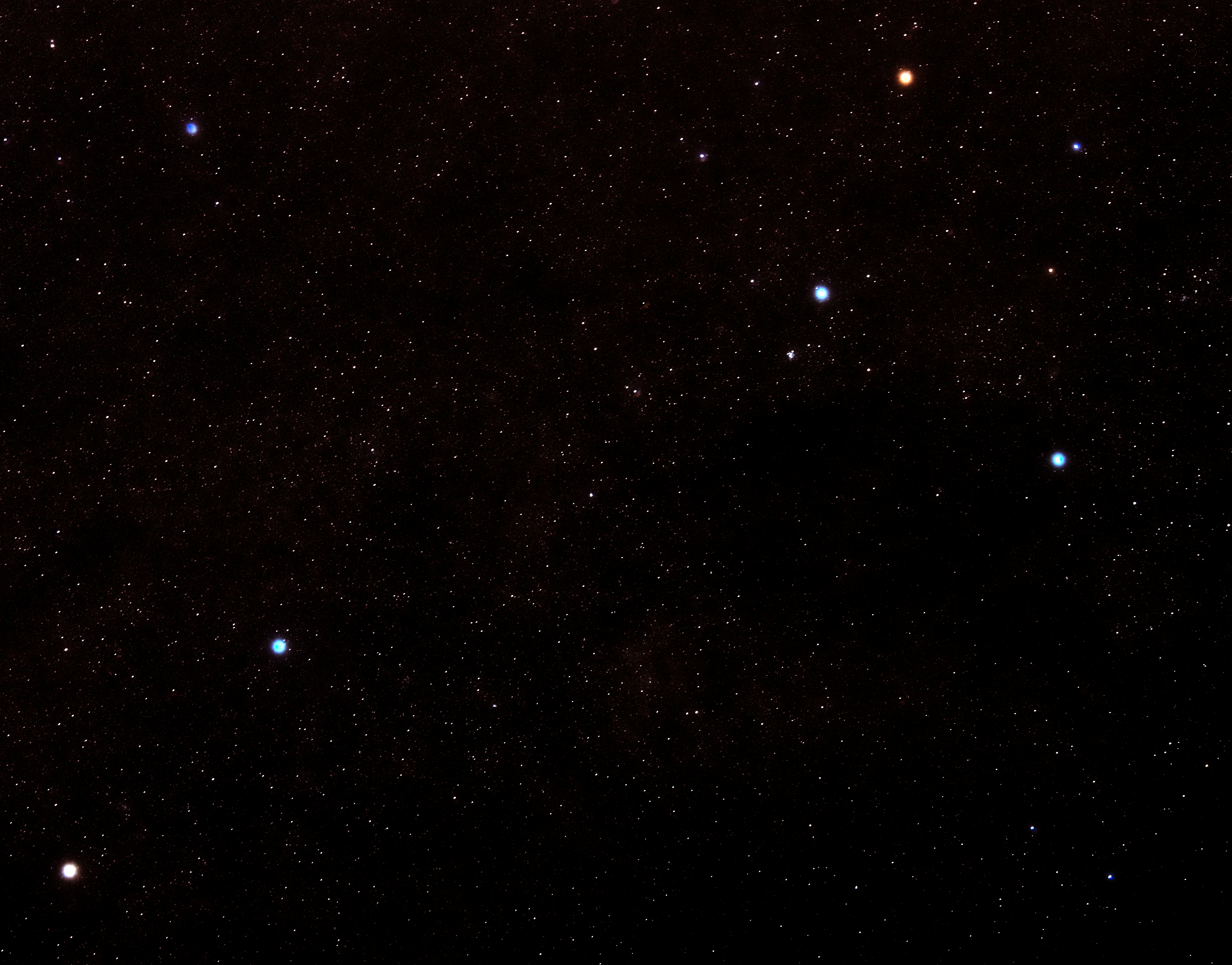
Left: The bright blue star on the right centre of this image is Epsilon Crucis. The colours used in this image represent specific wavelengths of infrared light. Blue represents light emitted at 3.4 and 4.6 micrometres. North is towards bottom left. Right: Crux (Southern Cross) from Hobart, Tasmania.
