= Lambda Crucis =

Star in the constellation Crux

- Location of λ Crucis (circled)

Observation data Epoch J2000 Equinox ICRS
- Constellation: Crux
- Right ascension: 12^{h} 54^{m} 39.183^{s}
- Declination: −59° 08′ 48.129″
- Apparent magnitude (V): 4.62

Characteristics
- Evolutionary stage: main sequence
- Spectral type: B4 Vne
- U−B color index: −0.60
- B−V color index: −0.15
- Variable type: β Cep?

Astrometry
Radial velocity (R_{v})	+12.0±4.2 km/s
Proper motion (μ)	RA: −33.051 mas/yr Dec.: −14.751 mas/yr
Parallax (π)	8.7730±0.1018 mas
Distance	372 ± 4 ly (114 ± 1 pc)
Absolute magnitude (M_{V})	−1.2

Details
Mass	5.0±0.1 M_{☉}
Radius	3.00 R_{☉}
Luminosity	790 L_{☉}
Surface gravity (log g)	3.01 cgs
Temperature	16,500 K
Rotational velocity (v sin i)	290 km/s
Age	53.3±8.1 Myr

Other designations
- λ Cru, Lambda Cru, CD−58°4794, HD 112078, HIP 63007, HR 4897, SAO 240368

Database references
SIMBAD	data

Lambda Crucis is a single, variable star in the southern constellation Crux, near the constellation border with Centaurus. Its name is a Bayer designation that is Latinized from λ Crucis and abbreviated Lambda Cru or λ Cru. This star is visible to the naked eye as a faint, blue-white hued point of light with an apparent visual magnitude that fluctuates around 4.62. The star is located approximately 372 light-years (114 pc) distant from the Sun based on parallax, and is drifting further away with a radial velocity of +12 km/s. It is a proper motion member of the Lower Centaurus–Crux sub-group in the Scorpius–Centaurus OB association, the nearest such association of co-moving massive stars to the Sun.

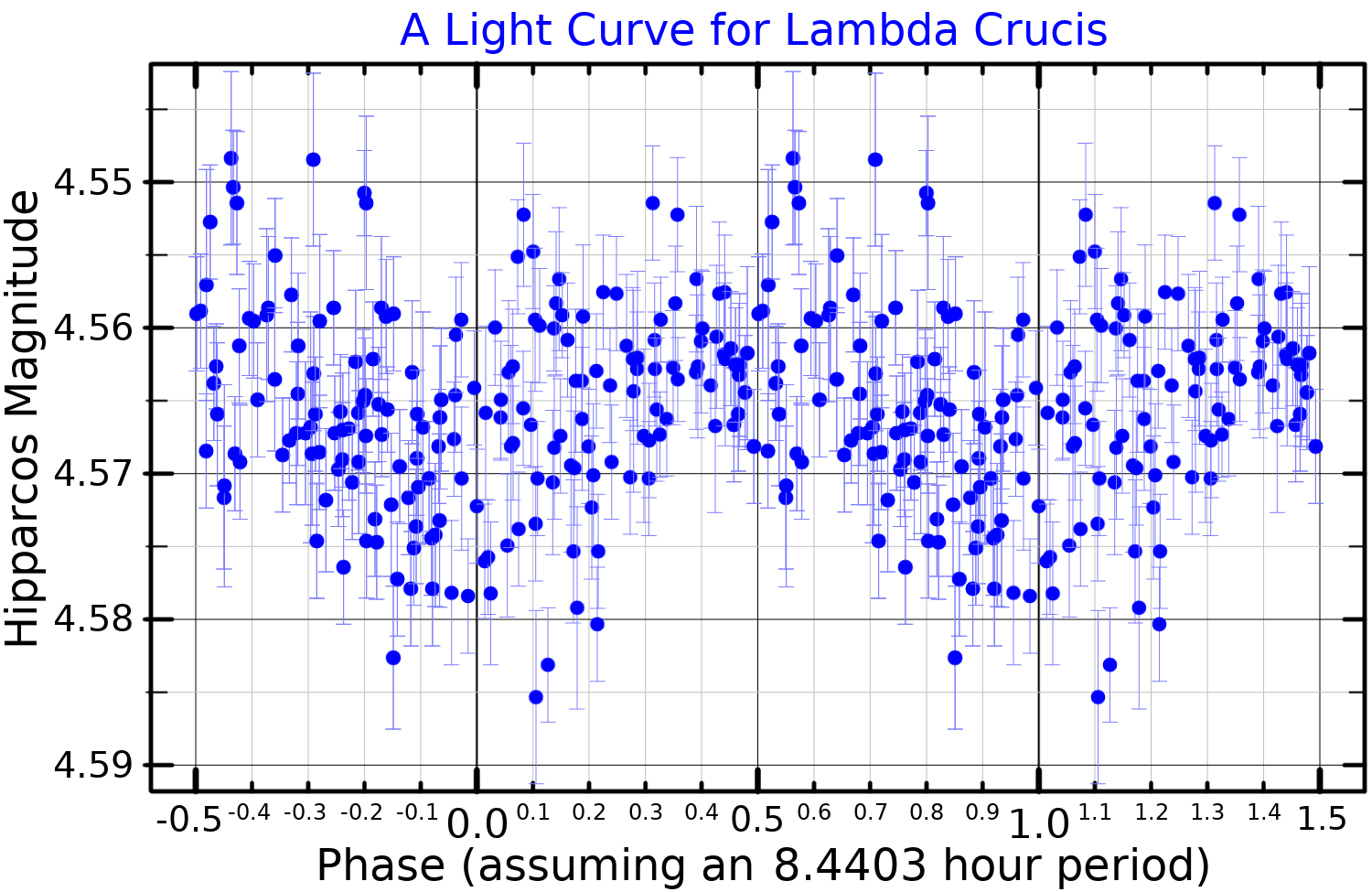
A light curve for Lambda Crucis, plotted from Hipparcos data

λ Crucis is listed in the General Catalogue of Variable Stars as a possible β Cephei-type variable. Its brightness varies with an amplitude of 0^{m}.02 over a period of 0.3951 days. However, it is suspected to be a different type of variable, possibly a λ Eridani variable or rotating ellipsoidal variable.

This object is a B-type main-sequence star with a stellar classification of B4 Vne, where the suffix notation indicates "nebulous" (broad) lines due to rapid rotation, along with emission lines from circumstellar material, making it a Be star. It is around 53 million years old and is spinning rapidly with a projected rotational velocity of 341 km/s. The star has five times the mass of the Sun and about 3.0 times the Sun's radius. It is radiating 790 times the luminosity of the Sun from its photosphere at an effective temperature of 16,500 K.
