= Crux =

Constellation in the southern celestial hemisphere

- Constellation
- List of stars in Crux
- Abbreviation: Cru
- Genitive: Crucis
- Pronunciation: /krʌks/ KRUKS, genitive /ˈkruːsɪs/ KROO-siss
- Symbolism: Southern Cross
- Right ascension: 12.5^{h}
- Declination: −60°
- Quadrant: SQ3
- Area: 68 sq. deg. (88th)
- Main stars: 4 or 5 (including Ginan)
- Bayer/Flamsteed stars: 15
- Stars brighter than 3.00^{m}: 5
- Stars within 10.00 pc (32.62 ly): 0
- Brightest star: Acrux (α Cru) (0.87^{m})
- Nearest star: GJ 1158 (L 194-11)
- Messier objects: 0
- Meteor showers: Crucids
- Bordering constellations: Centaurus; Musca
- Visible at latitudes between +20° and −90°. Best visible at 21:00 (9 p.m.) during the month of May.

Crux (/krʌks/ KRUKS) is a constellation of the southern sky that is centred on four bright stars in a cross-shaped asterism commonly known as the Southern Cross. It lies on the southern end of the Milky Way's visible band. The name Crux is Latin for cross. Though it is the smallest of all 88 modern constellations, Crux is among the most easily distinguished, as each of its four main stars has an apparent visual magnitude brighter than +2.8. It has attained a high level of cultural significance in many Southern Hemisphere states and nations.

Blue-white α Crucis (Acrux) is the most southerly member of the constellation, and at magnitude 0.8, the brightest. The three other stars of the cross appear clockwise and in order of lessening magnitude: β Crucis (Mimosa), γ Crucis (Gacrux), and δ Crucis (Imai). ε Crucis (Ginan) also lies within the cross asterism. Many of these brighter stars are members of the Scorpius–Centaurus association, a large but loose group of hot, blue-white stars that appear to share common origins and motion across the southern Milky Way.

Crux contains four Cepheid variables, each visible to the naked eye under optimum conditions. Crux also contains the bright and colourful open cluster known as the Jewel Box (NGC 4755) on its eastern border. Nearby to the southeast is a large dark nebula spanning 7° by 5° known as the Coalsack Nebula, portions of which are mapped in the neighbouring constellations of Centaurus and Musca.

== History ==
The bright stars in Crux were known to the Ancient Greeks, where Ptolemy regarded them as part of the constellation Centaurus. They were entirely visible as far north as Britain in the fourth millennium BC. However, the precession of the equinoxes gradually lowered the stars below the European horizon, and they were eventually forgotten by the inhabitants of northern latitudes. By 400 AD, the stars in the constellation now called Crux never rose above the horizon throughout most of Europe. Dante may have known about the constellation in the 14th century, as he describes an asterism of four bright stars in the southern sky in his Divine Comedy. His description, however, may be allegorical, and the similarity to the constellation a coincidence.

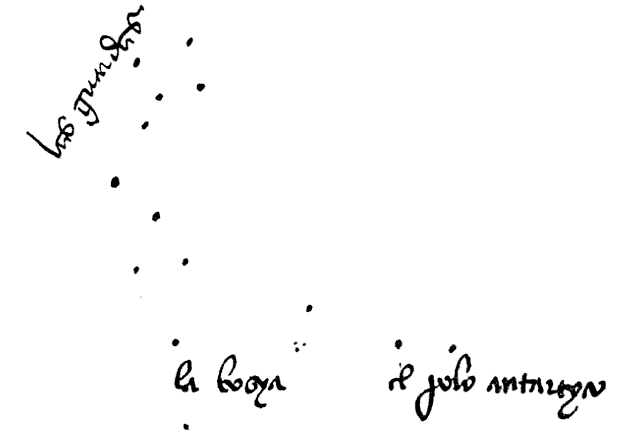
Depiction of Crux (upper left) by João Faras in May 1500. He termed the four stars Las Guardas (i.e. The Guards)

Venetian navigator Alvise Cadamosto in the 15th century made note of what was probably the Southern Cross on exiting the Gambia River in 1455, calling it the carro dell'ostro ("southern chariot"). However, Cadamosto's accompanying diagram was inaccurate. Historians generally credit João Faras (Note: João Faras was an astronomer and physician of King Manuel I of Portugal, who accompanied Pedro Álvares Cabral in the discovery of Brazil in 1500) for being the first European to depict it correctly. Faras sketched and described the constellation (calling it "las guardas") in a letter written on the beaches of Brazil on 1 May 1500 to the Portuguese monarch.

Explorer Amerigo Vespucci seems to have observed not only the Southern Cross, but also the neighboring Coalsack Nebula on his second voyage in 1501–1502.

Another early modern description clearly describing Crux as a separate constellation is attributed to Andrea Corsali, an Italian navigator who from 1515 to 1517 sailed to China and the East Indies in an expedition sponsored by King Manuel I. In 1516, Corsali wrote a letter to the monarch describing his observations of the southern sky, which included a rather crude map of the stars around the south celestial pole, including the Southern Cross and the two Magellanic Clouds seen in an external orientation, as on a globe.

Emery Molyneux and Petrus Plancius have also been cited as the first uranographers (sky mappers) to distinguish Crux as a separate constellation; their representations date from 1592, the former depicting it on his celestial globe and the latter in one of the small celestial maps on his large wall map. Both authors, however, depended on unreliable sources and placed Crux in the wrong position. Crux was first shown in its correct position on the celestial globes of Petrus Plancius and Jodocus Hondius in 1598 and 1600. Its stars were first catalogued separately from Centaurus by Frederick de Houtman in 1603. The constellation was later adopted by Jakob Bartsch in 1624 and Augustin Royer in 1679. Royer is sometimes wrongly cited as initially distinguishing Crux.

=== In non-Western astronomy ===
In India, a story relates the creation of Trishanku Swarga (त्रिशंकु), meaning Cross (Crux), created by Sage Vishwamitra.

In Chinese, 十字架 (Shí Zì Jià), meaning Cross, refers to an asterism consisting of γ Crucis, α Crucis, β Crucis, and δ Crucis.

In Australian Aboriginal astronomy, Crux and the Coalsack mark the head of the Emu in the Sky (which is seen in the dark spaces rather than in the patterns of stars) in several Aboriginal cultures, while Crux itself is said to be a possum sitting in a tree (Boorong people of the Wimmera region of northwestern Victoria), a representation of the sky deity Mirrabooka (Quandamooka people of Stradbroke Island), a stingray (Yolngu people of Arnhem Land), or an eagle (Kaurna people of the Adelaide Plains). Two Pacific constellations also included Gamma Centauri. Torres Strait Islanders in modern-day Australia saw Gamma Centauri as the handle and the four stars as the left hand of Tagai, and the stars of Musca as the trident of the fishing spear he is holding. In Aranda traditions of central Australia, the four Cross stars are the talon of an eagle and Gamma Centauri as its leg.

Various peoples in the East Indies and Brazil viewed the four main stars as the body of a ray. In both Indonesia and Malaysia, it is known as Bintang Pari and Buruj Pari, respectively ("ray stars"). This aquatic theme is also shared by an archaic name of the constellation in Vietnam, where it was once known as sao Cá Liệt (the ponyfish star).

Among Filipino people, the Southern Cross has various names pertaining to tops, including kasing (Visayan languages), paglong (Bikol), and pasil (Tagalog). It is also called butiti (puffer fish) in Waray.

The Javanese people of Indonesia called this constellation Gubug pèncèng ("raking hut") or lumbung ("the granary"), because the shape of the constellation was like that of a raking hut.

The Southern Cross (α, β, γ, and δ Crucis) together with μ Crucis, is one of the asterisms used by Bugis sailors for navigation, called bintoéng bola képpang, meaning "incomplete house star"

The Māori name for the Southern Cross is Māhutonga and it is thought of as the anchor (Te Punga) of Tama-rereti's waka (the Milky Way), while the Pointers are its rope. In Tonga it is known as Toloa ("duck"); it is depicted as a duck flying south, with one of his wings (δ Crucis) wounded because Ongo tangata ("two men", α and β Centauri) threw a stone at it. The Coalsack is known as Humu (the "triggerfish"), because of its shape. In Samoa the constellation is called Sumu ("triggerfish") because of its rhomboid shape, while α and β Centauri are called Luatagata (Two Men), just as they are in Tonga. The peoples of the Solomon Islands saw several figures in the Southern Cross. These included a knee protector and a net used to catch Palolo worms. Neighboring peoples in the Marshall Islands saw these stars as a fish. Peninsular Malays also see the likeness of a fish in the Crux, particularly the Scomberomorus or its local name Tohok.

In Mapudungun, the language of Patagonian Mapuches, the name of the Southern Cross is Melipal, which means "four stars". In Quechua, the language of the Inca civilization, Crux is known as "Chakana", which means literally "stair" (chaka, bridge, link; hanan, high, above), but carries a deep symbolism within Quechua mysticism. Alpha and Beta Crucis make up one foot of the Great Rhea, a constellation encompassing Centaurus and Circinus along with the two bright stars. The Great Rhea was a constellation of the Bororo of Brazil. The Mocoví people of Argentina also saw a rhea including the stars of Crux. Their rhea is attacked by two dogs, represented by bright stars in Centaurus and Circinus. The dogs' heads are marked by Alpha and Beta Centauri. The rhea's body is marked by the four main stars of Crux, while its head is Gamma Centauri and its feet are the bright stars of Musca. The Bakairi people of Brazil had a sprawling constellation representing a bird snare. It included the bright stars of Crux, the southern part of Centaurus, Circinus, at least one star in Lupus, the bright stars of Musca, Beta and the optical double star Delta^{1,2} Chamaeleontis: and some of the stars of Volans, and Mensa. The Kalapalo people of Mato Grosso state in Brazil saw the stars of Crux as Aganagi angry bees having emerged from the Coalsack, which they saw as the beehive.

Among Tuaregs, the four most visible stars of Crux are considered iggaren, i.e. four Maerua crassifolia trees. The Tswana people of Botswana saw the constellation as Dithutlwa, two giraffes – Alpha and Beta Crucis forming a male, and Gamma and Delta forming the female.

== Characteristics ==
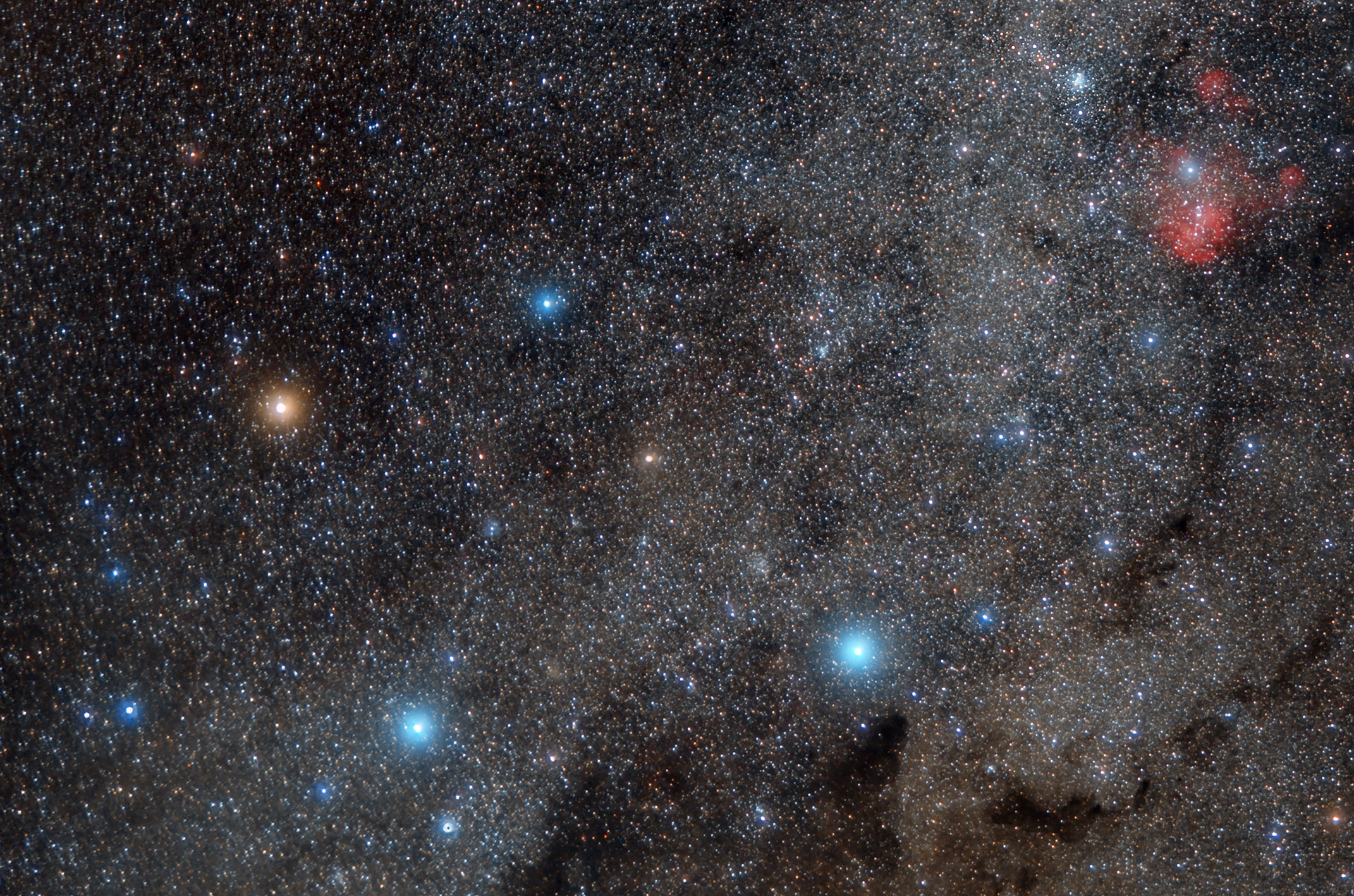
Southern Cross from New Zealand

Crux is bordered by the constellations Centaurus (which surrounds it on three sides) on the east, north, and west, and Musca to the south. Covering 68.4 square degrees and 0.166% of the night sky, it is the smallest of the 88 constellations. The three-letter abbreviation for the constellation, as adopted by the International Astronomical Union in 1922, is "Cru". The official constellation boundaries, as set by Belgian astronomer Eugène Delporte in 1930, are defined by a polygon of four segments. In the equatorial coordinate system, the right ascension coordinates of these borders lie between 11^{h} 56.13^{m} and 12^{h} 57.45^{m} , while the declination coordinates are between −55.68° and −64.70°. Its totality figures at least part of the year south of the 25th parallel north. (Note: While parts of the constellation technically rise above the horizon to observers between 25°N and 34°N, stars within a few degrees of the horizon are to all intents and purposes unobservable.)

In tropical regions, Crux can be seen in the sky from April to June. Crux is exactly opposite to Cassiopeia on the celestial sphere, so it cannot appear in the sky with the latter at the same time. In this era, south of Cape Town, Adelaide, and Buenos Aires (the 34th parallel south), Crux is circumpolar, thus always appears in the sky.

Crux is sometimes confused with the nearby False Cross asterism by stargazers. The False Cross consists of stars in Carina and Vela, is larger and dimmer, does not have a fifth star, and lacks the two prominent nearby "Pointer Stars". Between the two is the even larger and dimmer Diamond Cross.

=== Visibility ===
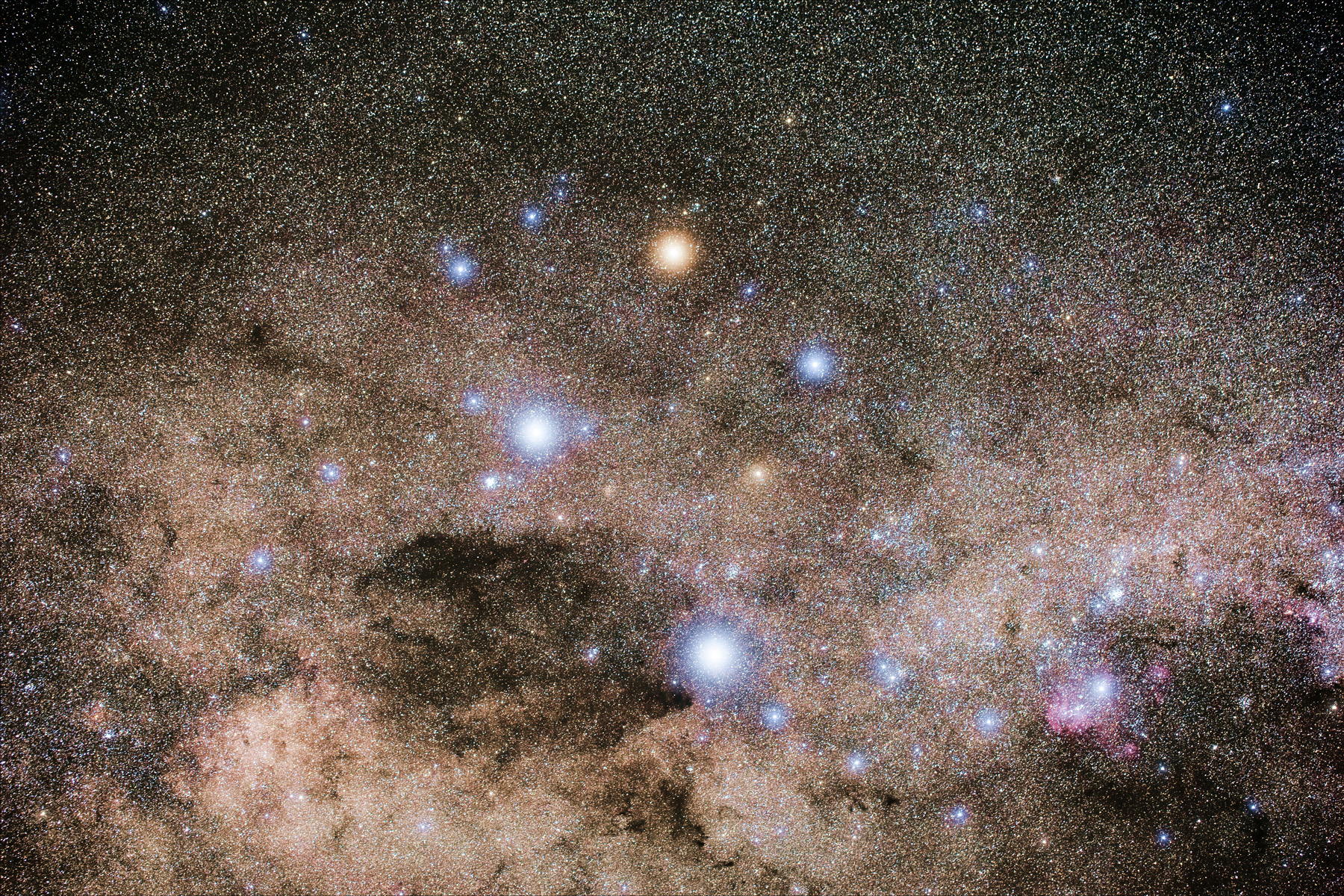
Deep exposure of Crux, Coalsack Nebula, and IC 2944

Crux is easily visible from the Southern Hemisphere, south of 35th parallel at practically any time of year as circumpolar. It is also visible near the horizon from tropical latitudes of the Northern Hemisphere for a few hours every night during the northern winter and spring. For instance, it is visible from Cancún or any other place at latitude 25° N or less at around 10 pm at the end of April. There are 5 main stars. Due to precession, Crux will move closer to the South Pole in the next few millennia, up to 67° south declination for the middle of the constellation. However, by the year 14,000, Crux will be visible for most parts of Europe and the continental United States. Its visibility will extend to Northern Europe by 18,000, when it will be less than 30° south declination.

=== Use in navigation ===
Locating the south celestial pole

In the Southern Hemisphere, the Southern Cross is frequently used for navigation in much the same way that Polaris is used in the Northern Hemisphere. Projecting a line from γ to α Crucis (the foot of the crucifix) about 4½ times beyond gives a point close to the Southern Celestial Pole which is also, coincidentally, where it intersects a perpendicular line taken southwards from the east–west axis of Alpha Centauri to Beta Centauri, which are stars at an alike declination to Crux and of a similar width as the cross, but higher magnitude. Argentine gauchos are documented as using Crux for night orientation in the Pampas and Patagonia.

Alpha and Beta Centauri are of similar declinations (thus distance from the pole) and are often referred as the "Southern Pointers" or just "the Pointers", allowing people to easily identify the Southern Cross, the constellation of Crux. Very few bright stars lie between Crux and the pole itself, although the constellation Musca is fairly easily recognised immediately south of Crux.

== Features ==
=== Stars ===
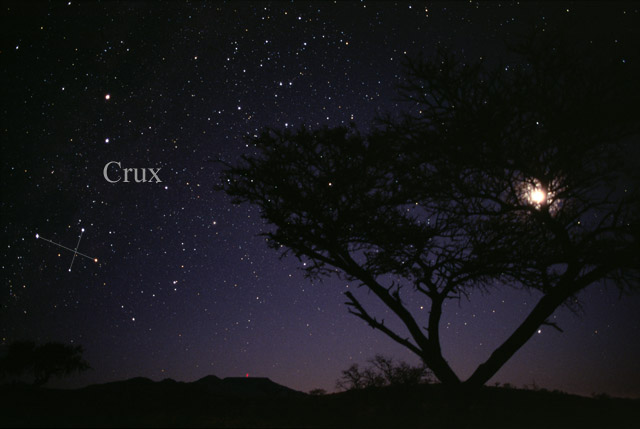
The constellation Crux as it can be seen by the naked eye

Lacaille gave 13 stars Bayer designations Alpha through Lambda in 1756 and labelled two stars as Alpha and Theta. In 1879, Benjamin Gould added Mu Crucis (Mu^{1} and Mu^{2}) as he felt the stars were bright enough to warrant their names.

Within the constellation's borders, 49 stars are brighter than or equal to apparent magnitude 6.5. (Note: Objects of magnitude 6.5 are among the faintest visible to the unaided eye in suburban-rural transition night skies.) The four main stars that form the asterism are Alpha, Beta, Gamma, and Delta Crucis.

- α Crucis or Acrux is a triple star 321 light-years from Earth. A rich blue in colour, with a visual magnitude 0.8 to the unaided eye, it has two close components of a similar magnitude, 1.3 and 1.8, respectively, plus another much wider component of the fifth magnitude. The two close components are resolved in a small amateur telescope and the wide component is readily visible in a pair of binoculars.
- β Crucis or Mimosa is a blue-hued giant star of magnitude 1.3, and lies 353 light-years from Earth. It is a Beta Cephei-type variable star with a variation of less than 0.1 magnitudes.
- γ Crucis or Gacrux is an optical double star. The primary is a red-hued giant star of magnitude 1.6, 88 light-years from Earth, and is one of the closest red giants to Earth. Its secondary component is magnitude 6.5, 264 light-years from Earth.
- δ Crucis (Imai) is a magnitude 2.8, blue-white hued star about 345 light-years from Earth. Like Mimosa, it is a Beta Cepheid variable.

Also, a fifth star is often included with the Southern Cross.

- ε Crucis (Ginan) is an orange-hued giant star of magnitude 3.6, 228 light-years from Earth.

Several other naked-eye stars are within the borders of Crux, especially:

- Iota Crucis is a visual double star 125 light-years from Earth. The primary is an orange-hued giant of magnitude 4.6 and the secondary at magnitude 9.5.
- Mu Crucis or Mu^{1,2} Crucis is a wide, double star where the components are about 370 light-years from Earth. Equally blue-white in colour, the components are magnitude 4.0 and 5.1, and are easily divisible in small amateur telescopes or large binoculars.

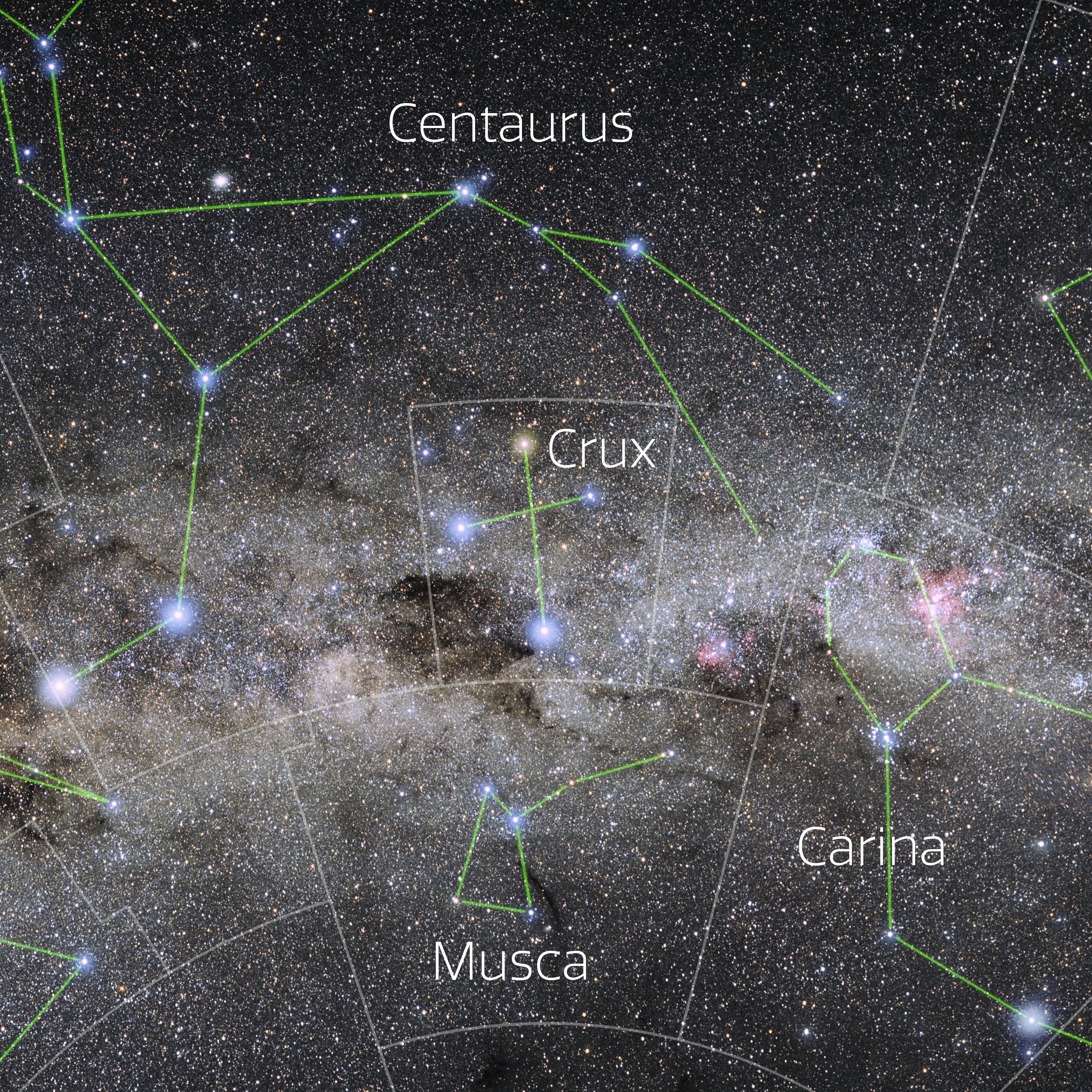
The constellation Crux showing the IAU boundaries, the constellation stick figure, and labels for its brightest stars. Astrophotograph by Eckhard Slawik, from NOIRLab's 88 Constellations project.

=== Scorpius–Centaurus association ===
Unusually, 15 of the 23 brightest stars in Crux are spectrally blue-white B-type stars. Among the five main bright stars, Delta, and probably Alpha and Beta, are likely co-moving B-type members of the Scorpius–Centaurus association, the nearest OB association to the Sun. They are among the highest-mass stellar members of the Lower Centaurus–Crux subgroup of the association, with ages of roughly 10 to 20 million years. Other members include the blue-white stars Zeta, Lambda, and both the components of the visual double star, Mu.

=== Bright stars ===
Down to apparent magnitude +2.5 are 92 stars that shine the brightest as viewed from the Earth. Three of these stars are in Crux, making it the most densely populated as to those stars (this being 3.26% of these 92 stars, and in turn being 19.2 times more than the expected 0.17% that would result on a homogenous distribution of all bright stars and a randomised drawing of all 88 constellations, given its area, 0.17% of the sky).

=== Variable stars ===
Crux contains many variable stars. It boasts four Cepheid variables that may all reach naked eye visibility.

- BG Crucis ranges from magnitude 5.34 to 5.58 over 3.3428 days,
- T Crucis ranges from 6.32 to 6.83 over 6.73331 days,
- S Crucis ranges from 6.22 to 6.92 over 4.68997 days,
- R Crucis ranges from 6.4 to 7.23 over 5.82575 days.

Other well-studied variable stars include:

- Lambda Crucis and Theta^{2} Crucis, that are both Beta Cepheid-type variable stars.
- BH Crucis, also known as Welch's Red Variable, is a Mira variable that ranges from magnitude 6.6 to 9.8 over 530 days. Discovered in October 1969, it has become redder and brighter (mean magnitude changing from 8.047 to 7.762) and its period lengthened by 25% in the first 30 years since its discovery.

=== Exoplanets ===
The star HD 106906 has been found to have a planet—HD 106906 b—that has one of the widest orbits of any currently known planetary-mass companions.

=== Objects beyond the Local Arm ===
Crux is backlit by the multitude of stars of the Scutum-Crux Arm (more commonly called the Scutum-Centaurus Arm) of the Milky Way. This is the main inner arm in the local radial quarter of the galaxy. Partly obscuring this is:

- The Coalsack Nebula lies partially within Crux and partly in the neighboring constellations of Musca and Centaurus. It is the most prominent dark nebula in the skies, and is easily visible to the naked eye as a prominent dark patch in the southern Milky Way. It can be found 6.5° southeast from the centre of Crux or 3° east from α Crucis. Its large area covers about 7° by 5°, and is 180 parsecs (590 ly) away from Earth.

A key feature of the Scutum-Crux Arm is:

- The Jewel Box, κ Crucis Cluster or NGC 4755, is a small but bright open cluster that appears as a fuzzy star to the naked eye and is very close to the easternmost boundary of Crux, about 1° southeast of Beta Crucis. The combined or total magnitude is 4.2, and it lies at a distance of 1.95 kiloparsecs (6,400 ly) from Earth. The cluster was given its name by John Herschel, based on the range of colours visible throughout the star cluster in his telescope. About seven million years old, it is one of the youngest open clusters in the Milky Way, and it appears to have the shape of a letter 'A'. The Jewel Box Cluster is classified as Shapley class 'g' and Trumpler class 'I 3 r -' cluster; it is a very rich, centrally concentrated cluster detached from the surrounding star field. It has more than 100 stars that range significantly in brightness. The brightest cluster stars are mostly blue supergiants, though the cluster contains at least one red supergiant. Kappa Crucis is a true member of the cluster that bears its name, and is one of the brighter stars at magnitude 5.9.

== In culture ==
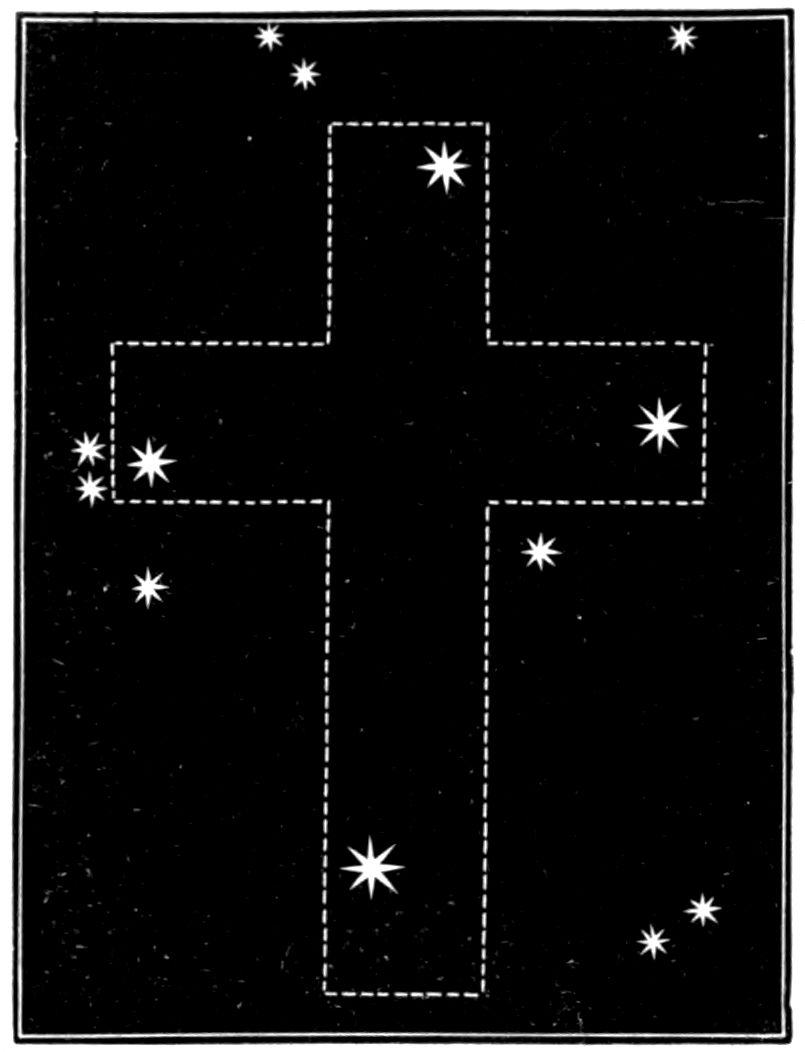
A depiction of the Southern Cross in Mark Twain's 1897 travelogue, Following the Equator

The most prominent feature of Crux is the distinctive asterism known as the Southern Cross. It has great significance in the cultures of the Southern Hemisphere, particularly of Australia, Brazil, Chile, and New Zealand. In Australia, it became popular as a tattoo, due to being seen as a patriotic symbol in the country.

=== Flags and symbols ===
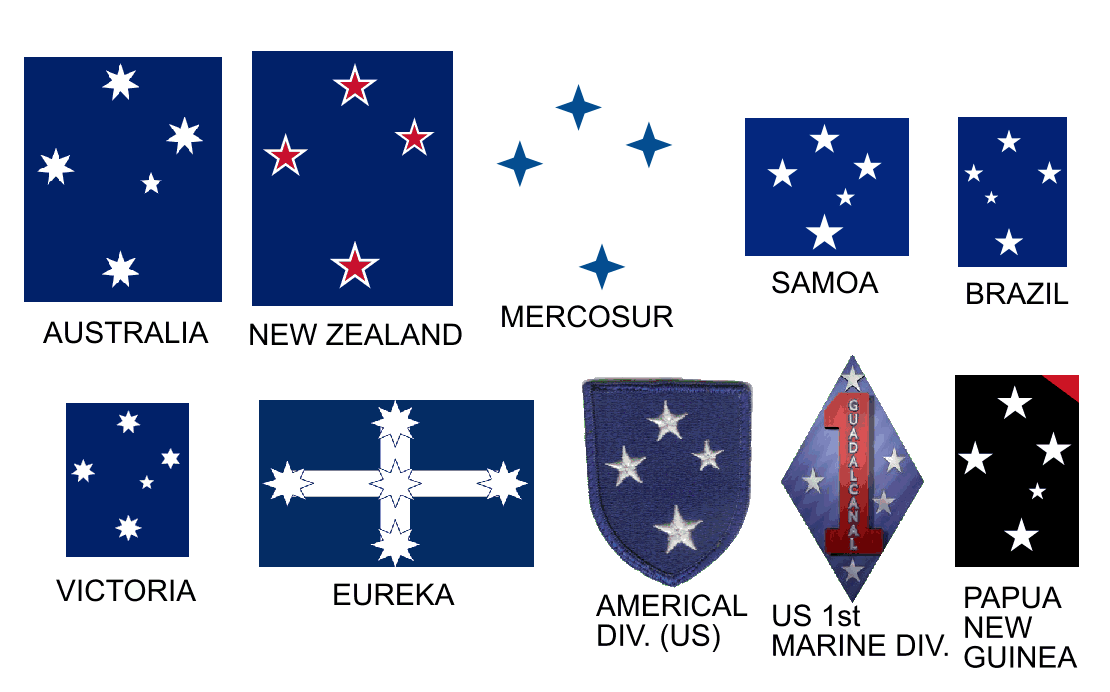
Crux, appearing on a number of flags and insignia

Several southern countries and organisations have traditionally used Crux as a national or distinctive symbol. The four or five brightest stars of Crux appear, heraldically standardised in various ways, on the national flags of Australia, Brazil, New Zealand, Papua New Guinea, and Samoa. A defaced version appears in the canton on the flag of Niue. They also appear on the flags of the Australian state of Victoria, the Australian Capital Territory, and the Northern Territory, as well as the flag of Magallanes Region of Chile, the flag of Londrina (Brazil) and several Argentine provincial flags and emblems (for example, Tierra del Fuego and Santa Cruz). It appears on the flags for the Australian external territories of Christmas Island and Cocos (Keeling) Islands, as well as Heard Island and McDonald Islands, which uses an identical flag to the national Australian flag. The flag of the Mercosur trading zone displays the four brightest stars. Crux also appears on the Brazilian coat of arms, and as of July 2015, on the cover of Brazilian passports.

Five stars appear in the logo of the Brazilian football team Cruzeiro Esporte Clube and in the insignia of the Order of the Southern Cross, and the constellation gave its name to the Brazilian currency, the cruzeiro (used twice from 1942–1986, and 1990–1994). All coins of the current (1998) series of the Brazilian real display the constellation. It is also mentioned in the first stanza of the Brazilian National Anthem (1909): "A imagem do Cruzeiro resplandece" ("the image of the Cross shines").

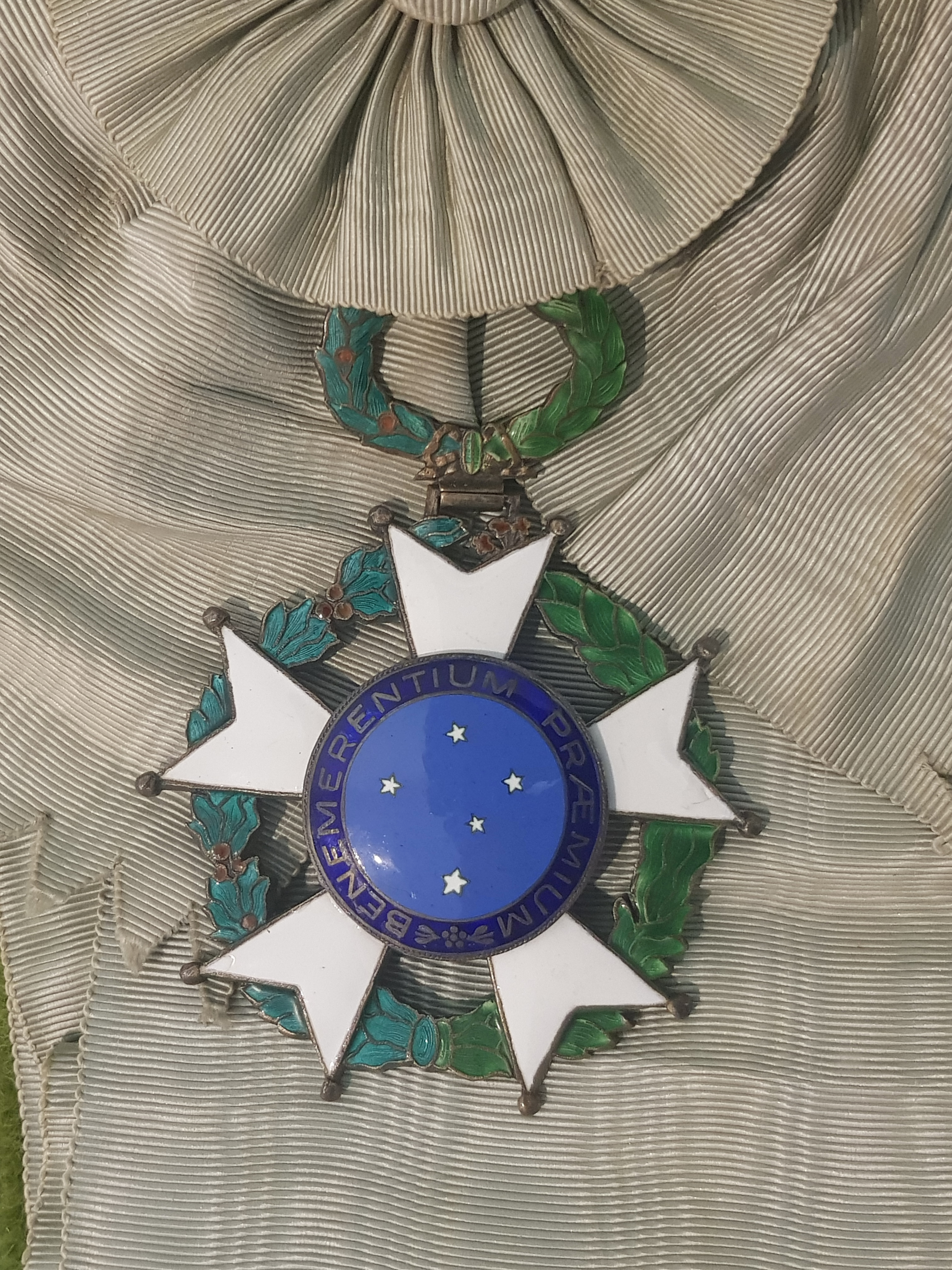
Brazil's National Order of the Southern Cross

Brazilian Air Force's Marshal of the Air military shoulder rank

Songs and literature reference the Southern Cross, including the Argentine epic poem Martín Fierro. The Argentinian singer Charly García says that he is "from the Southern Cross" in the song "No voy en tren".

The Southern Cross is mentioned in the second verse of the Australian National Anthem: "Beneath our radiant Southern Cross we'll toil with hearts and hands".

The Southern Cross features in the coat of arms of William Birdwood, 1st Baron Birdwood, the British officer who commanded the Australian and New Zealand Army Corps during the Gallipoli Campaign of the First World War.

The Southern Cross is also mentioned in the Samoan National Anthem. "Vaai 'i na fetu o lo'u a agiagia ai: Le faailoga lea o Iesu, na maliu ai mo Samoa." ("Look at those stars that are waving on it: This is the symbol of Jesus, who died on it for Samoa.")

The Order of the Southern Cross is a Brazilian order of chivalry awarded to "those who have rendered significant service to the Brazilian nation".

In "O Sweet Saint Martin's Land", the lyrics mention the Southern Cross: "Thy Southern Cross the night".

A stylized version of Crux appears on the Australian Eureka Flag. The constellation was also used on the dark blue, shield-like patch worn by personnel of the U.S. Army's Americal Division, which was organized in the Southern Hemisphere, on the island of New Caledonia, and also on the blue diamond of the U.S. 1st Marine Division, which fought on the Southern Hemisphere islands of Guadalcanal and New Britain.

The Petersflagge flag of the German East Africa Company of 1885–1920, which included a constellation of five white, five-pointed Crux "stars" on a red ground, later served as the model for symbolism associated with generic German colonial-oriented organisations: the Reichskolonialbund of 1936–1943 and the Friends of the former German Protectorates (1956/1983 to the present).

Southern Cross station is a major rail terminal in Melbourne, Australia.

The Southern Cross Route is the name given to the commercial passenger air route connecting Australia and the United Kingdom via the United States.

The Personal Ordinariate of Our Lady of the Southern Cross is a personal ordinariate of the Roman Catholic Church primarily within the territory of the Australian Catholic Bishops Conference for groups of Anglicans who desire full communion with the Catholic Church in Australia and Asia.

The Knights of the Southern Cross (KSC) is a Catholic fraternal order throughout Australia.

=== Media ===
The 1952-53 NBC Television Series Victory at Sea contained a musical number entitled "Beneath the Southern Cross".

"Southern Cross" is a single released by Crosby, Stills and Nash in 1981. It reached number 18 on Billboard Hot 100 in late 1982.

"The Sign of the Southern Cross" is a song released by Black Sabbath in 1981. The song was released on the album Mob Rules.

"Southern Cross" is a nickname given to the protagonist of the video game Ace Combat X: Skies of Deception.

Crux is included in Kirara Hoshi's technique in the anime Jujutsu Kaisen.

== See also ==
- Crux (Chinese astronomy)
- Northern Cross
