= Cha 1107−7626 =

Rogue planet or sub-brown dwarf

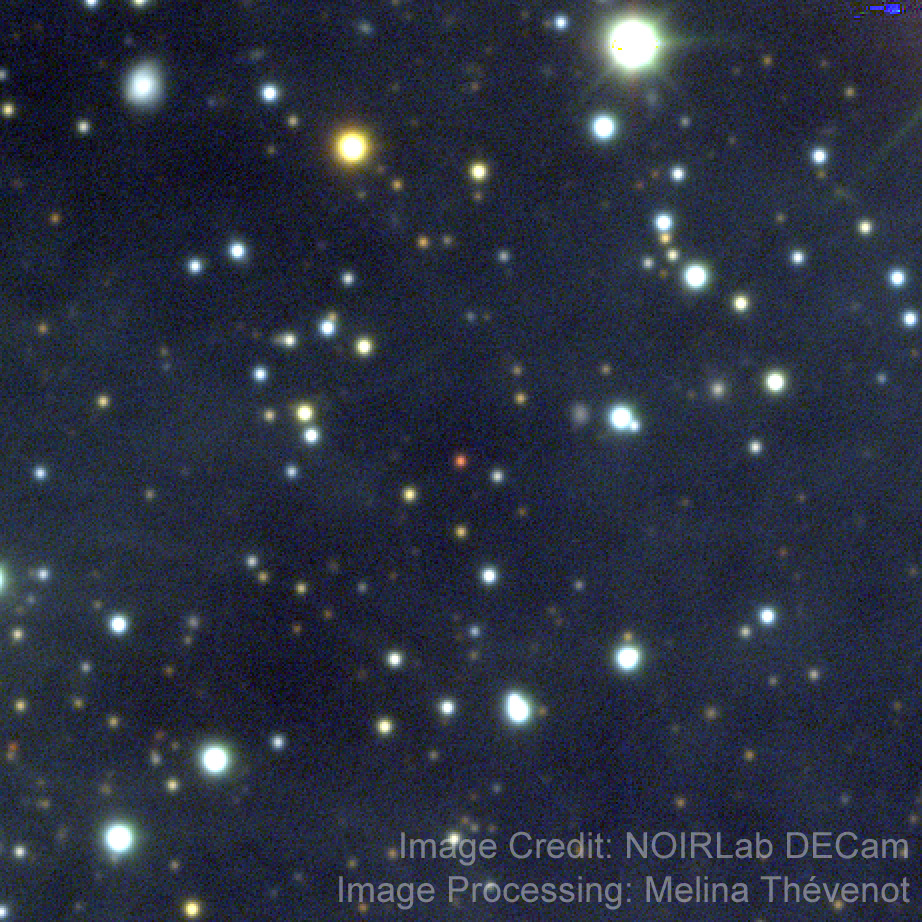
- Cha 1107−7626 is the orange-red object in the middle of this DECam image.

Observation data Epoch J2000 Equinox J2000
- Constellation: Chamaeleon
- Right ascension: 11^{h} 07^{m} 07.72512^{s}
- Declination: −76° 26′ 32.5176″

Characteristics
- Evolutionary stage: Brown dwarf
- Spectral type: L0±1
- Apparent magnitude (J): 17.61±0.03
- Apparent magnitude (H): 16.80±0.03
- Apparent magnitude (Ks): 15.91±0.02

Astrometry
Proper motion (μ)	RA: −13.8±0.8 mas/yr Dec.: −0.4±3.2 mas/yr
Distance	~620 ly (~190 pc)

Details
Mass	6−10 M_{Jup}
Radius	2.8 R_{Jup}
Luminosity (bolometric)	0.00033 L_{☉}
Surface gravity (log g)	3.5 cgs
Temperature	1900±100 K
Age	1−3 Myr

Other designations
- WISE J110707.72-762632.5, WISEA J110707.69-762632.5, [L2007b] Cha J11070768-7626326

Database references
SIMBAD	data

Cha 1107−7626 (Cha J11070768−7626326) is a free-floating planetary-mass object in the Chamaeleon I star-forming region, about 190 parsecs (620 ly) distant from the Solar System. It is the lowest-mass object with hydrocarbons detected in its disk (as of May 2025). The object is located north-west of IC 2631.

== Discovery ==
Cha 1107−7626 was discovered in 2008 by Kevin Luhman et al. with the Spitzer Space Telescope and the Magellan II telescope. The researchers estimated a spectral type of L0, due to it having weaker TiO and VO absorption compared to other low-mass members of the Chamaeleon I region, such as OTS 44 and Cha 110913−773444. Initially the mass was estimated to be 0.004–0.01 M_{☉} (4.2–10.5 M_{J}). A work by Laura Flagg et al. (2025) observed the object with the James Webb Space Telescope instruments NIRSpec and MIRI. This work refined the mass of Cha 1107−7626 to 6-10 M_{J}. It also detected hydrocarbons in the disk of this planetary-mass object. According to scientists, it has also been known for gaining 6 billion tonnes of mass a second in an outburst beginning in June 2025.

== The circumstellar disk ==
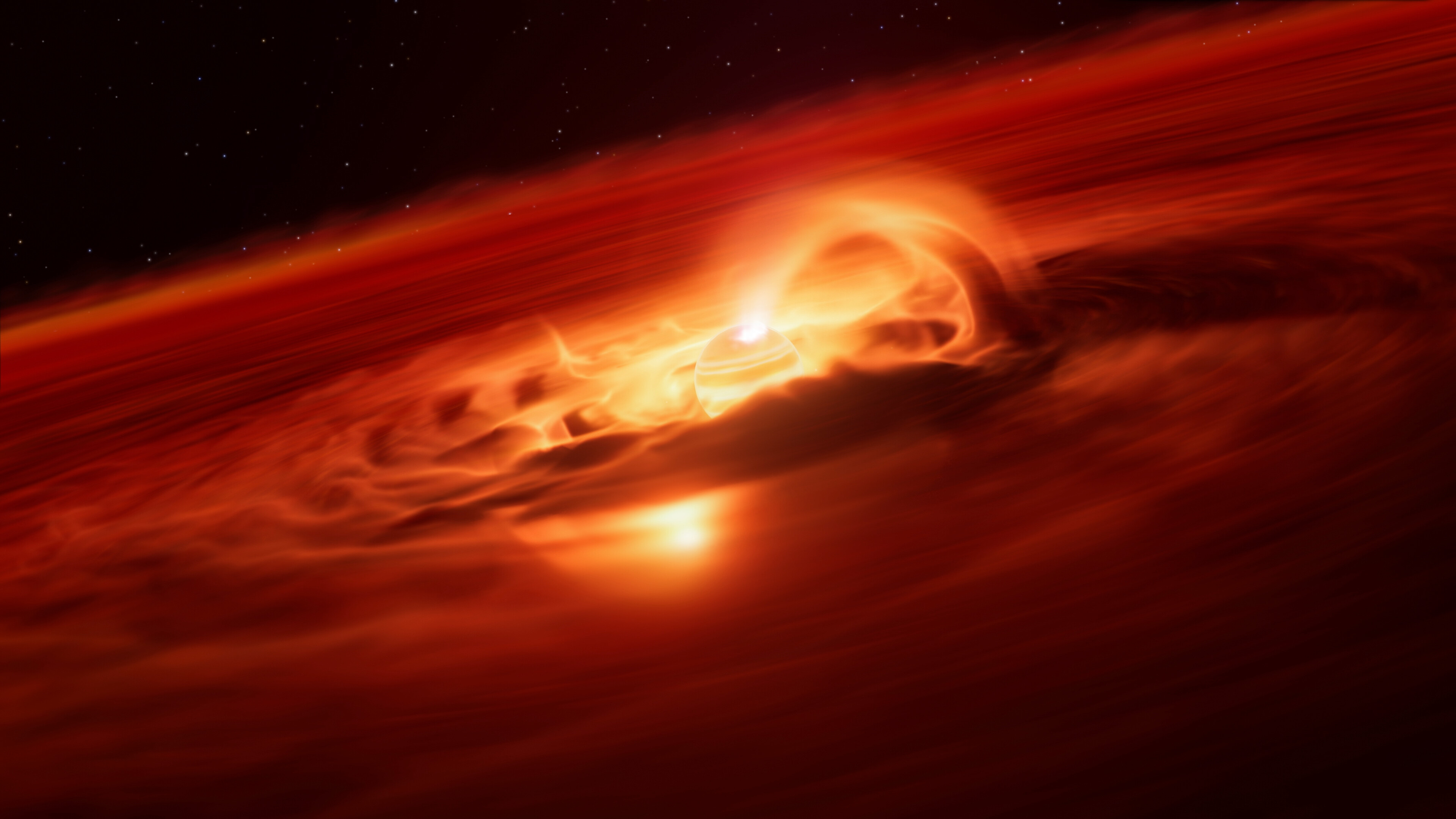
Artist impression of Cha 1107–7626 and its disk

The Spitzer photometry showed an infrared excess, which indicated that the object is surrounded by a circumplanetary disk. The optical spectrum with Magellan/LDSS-3 showed strong H-alpha emission, indicating the planetary-mass object is actively accreting hydrogen gas from the surrounding disk. New and archived observations with JWST, Magellan and VLT/SINFONI were used to study the disk in more detail. The VLT spectrum showed Paschen-beta line, which is also a sign for active accretion. The rate at which Cha 1107−7626 accretes material from the disk was estimated to be between 10^{−10} and 10^{−11} solar masses per year (or the mass of 2 Pallas per year, or less). The MIRI low-resolution spectrum shows spectral features that match emission by methane and ethylene, as well as hints of emission by ethane. Hydrocarbons are also very common in disks around young very low-mass stars, and the mid-infrared spectrum was found to be very similar to the low-mass star ISO-ChaI 147, located in the same star-forming region. These similarities hint at similar processes in disks around young objects with different masses and isolated planetary-mass objects might be able to form their own miniature planetary systems. For low-mass objects, such as WISEA J044634.16-262756.1, it is suggested that the carbon-rich gases could lead to carbon-rich atmospheres, similar to Titan. Additionally it could lead to carbon-poor solids on planets, if the planets are assembled from solids at a late stage. These solids lose their carbon to the gas phase of the disk.

An accretion burst was detected with the Very Large Telescope between June and August 2025. This was followed up with JWST spectroscopy. The accretion rate increased six to eight times, reaching 10^{−7} M_{J} per year, the highest measured in a planetary-mass object. During the outburst the Hα line developed a double peak and a redshifted absorption, similar to stars undergoing magnetospheric accretion. The outburst also showed clear changes in hydrocarbon emission lines and the appearance of water vapour emission. The researchers find that a similar burst happened in 2016. The burst is similar to EXor-type bursts in young stars.

== See also ==
Other free-floating planetary-mass objects with disks:

- 2MASS J11151597+1937266
- J1407b
- KPNO-Tau 12
- Cha 110913−773444

Other planetary-mass objects with disks that bound to a star:

- SR 12c
- Delorme 1 (AB)b
- 2M1207b
- PDS 70c
