= Circumplanetary disk =

Accumulation of matter around a planet

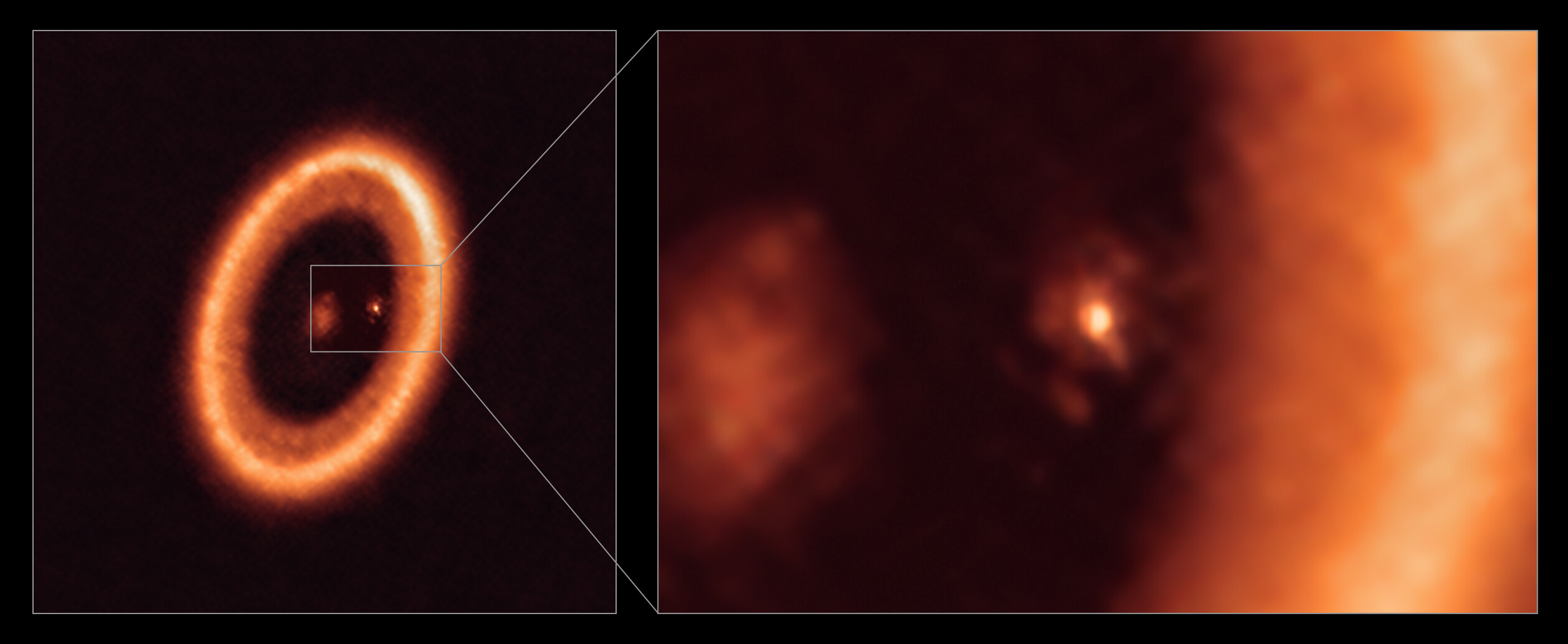
Circumplanetary disk around exoplanet PDS 70c (point-like source and surrounding cloud in the center of the right image; brightness indicates the hot hydrogen circumplanetary disk), within a circumstellar disk (left image)

A circumplanetary disk (or circumplanetary disc, short CPD) is a torus, pancake or ring-shaped accumulation of matter composed of gas, dust, planetesimals, asteroids or collision fragments in orbit around a planet. They are reservoirs of material out of which moons (or exomoons or subsatellites) may form. Such a disk can manifest itself in various ways.

== Theory ==
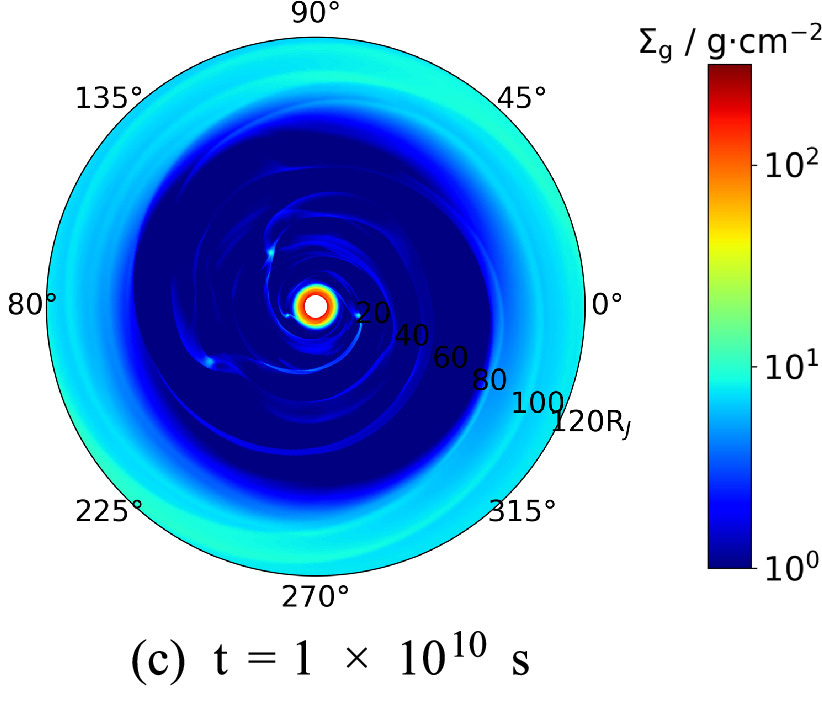
Hydrodynamic simulation of the inner part of a circumplanetary disk after exomoons were added to the disk. Simulation by Sun et al.

A giant planet will mainly form via core accretion. In this scenario a core forms via the accretion of small solids. Once the core is massive enough it might carve a gap onto the circumstellar disk around the host star. Material will flow from the edges of the circumstellar disk towards the planet in streams and around the planet it will form a circumplanetary disk. A circumplanetary disk does therefore form during the late stage of giant planet formation. The size of the disk is limited by the Hill radius. A circumplanetary disk will have a maximal disk size of 0.4 times the Hill radius. The disk also has a "dead zone" at the mid-plane that is non-turbulent and a turbulent disk surface. The dead zone is a favourable region for satellites (exomoons) to form. The circumplanetary disk will go through different stages of evolution. A classification similar to young stellar objects was proposed. In the early stage the circumplanetary disk will be full. Newly forming satellites will carve a gap close to the planet, turning the disk into a "transitional" disk. In the last stage the disk is full, but has a low density and can be classified as "evolved". Additional to a circumplanetary disk, a protoplanet can also drive an outflow. One such outflow is identified via shocked SiS for HD 169142b.

Circumplanetary disks are consistent with the formation of the Galilean satellites. The older models were not consistent with the icy composition of the moons and the incomplete differentiation of Callisto. A circumplanetary disk with an inflow of 2*10^{−7} M_{J}/year of gas and solids was consistent with the conditions needed to form the moons, including the low temperature during the late stage of the formation of Jupiter. But later simulations found the circumplanetary disk too hot for the satellites to form and survive. This was later solved by introducing the dead zone within circumplanetary disks which is a favourable region for satellite formation and explains the compact orbit of Galilean satellites.

== Candidates around exoplanets ==
2M1207b was suspected to have a circumplanetary disk in the past. New observations from JWST/NIRSpec were able to confirm accretion from an unseen disk by detecting emission from hydrogen and helium. The classification of a circumplanetary disk is however being disputed because 2M1207b (or 2M1207B) might be classified as a binary together with 2M1207A and not an exoplanet. This would make the disk around 2M1207b a circumstellar disk, despite not being around a star, but around a 5–6 M_{Jup} planetary-mass object.

In August 2018, astronomers reported the probable detection of a circumplanetary disk around CS Cha B. The authors state that "The CS Cha system is the only system in which a circumplanetary disc is likely present as well as a resolved circumstellar disc." In 2020 though, the parameters of CS Cha B were revised, making it most likely an accreting red dwarf star, and making the disk most likely circumstellar.

Possible circumplanetary disks have also been detected around exoplanets, HD 100546 b, AS 209 b and HD 169142 b or planetary-mass companions (PMC; 10-20 M_{J}, separation ≥100 AU), such as GSC 06214-00210 b and DH Tauri b.

A disk was detected in sub-mm with ALMA around SR 12 c, a planetary-mass companion. SR 12 c might not have formed from the circumstellar disk material of the host star SR 12, so it might not be considered a true circumplanetary disk. PMC disks are relative common around young objects and are easier to study when compared to circumplanetary disks. The protoplanet Delorme 1 (AB)b shows strong evidence of accretion from a circumplanetary disk, but the disk is as of now (September 2024) not detected in the infrared. A disk was detected around the planet YSES 1b with the James Webb Space Telescope. The disk shows emission by small hot olivine grains. This is seen as evidence for collisions between satellites forming inside the disk.

Several disks were detected around nearby isolated planetary-mass objects. Disks around such objects within 300 parsecs were found in Rho Ophiuchi Complex, Taurus Complex (e.g. KPNO-Tau 12), Lupus I Cloud and the Chamaeleon Complex (e.g. the well studied OTS 44 and Cha 110913−773444). One remarkable close free-floating disk-bearing object is 2MASS J11151597+1937266, which is only 45 parsec distant. It could be a planetary-mass object or a low-mass brown dwarf. These objects with disks are free-floating and are most of the time called circumstellar disks, despite likely being similar to circumplanetary disks.

=== PDS 70 ===
The disk around the planet c of the PDS 70 system is the best evidence for a circumplanetary disk at the time of its discovery. The exoplanet is part of the multiplanetary PDS 70 star system, about 370 light-years (110 parsecs) from Earth.

==== PDS 70b ====
In June 2019 astronomers reported the detection of evidence of a circumplanetary disk around PDS 70b using spectroscopy and accretion signatures. Both types of these signatures had previously been detected for other planetary candidates. A later infrared characterization could not confirm the spectroscopic evidence for the disk around PDS 70b and reports weak evidence that the current data favors a model with a single blackbody component. Interferometric observations with the James Webb Space Telescope's Fine Guidance Sensor and Near Infrared Imager and Slitless Spectrograph and archived data found tentative evidence that PDS 70b has a circumplanetary disk.

==== PDS 70c ====
In July 2019 astronomers reported the first-ever detection using the Atacama Large Millimeter/submillimeter Array (ALMA) of a circumplanetary disk. ALMA studies, using millimetre and submillimetre wavelengths, are better at observing dust concentrated in interplanetary regions, since stars emit comparatively little light at these wavelengths, and since optical observations are often obscured by overwhelming glare from the bright host star. The circumplanetary disk was detected around a young massive, Jupiter-like exoplanet, PDS 70c.

According to Andrea Isella, lead researcher from the Rice University in Houston, Texas, "For the first time, we can conclusively see the tell-tale signs of a circumplanetary disk, which helps to support many of the current theories of planet formation ... By comparing our observations to the high-resolution infrared and optical images, we can clearly see that an otherwise enigmatic concentration of tiny dust particles is actually a planet-girding disk of dust, the first such feature ever conclusively observed." Jason Wang from Caltech, lead researcher of another publication, explains, "if a planet appears to sit on top of the disk, which is the case with PDS 70c" then the signal around PDS 70c needs to be spatially separated from the outer ring, not the case in 2019. However, in July 2021 higher resolution, conclusively resolved data were presented.

The planet PDS 70c is detected in H-alpha, which is seen as evidence that it accretes material from the circumplanetary disk at a rate of 10^{−8±0.4} M_{J} per year. From ALMA observations it was shown that this disk has a radius smaller than 1.2 astronomical units (AU) or a third of the Hill radius. The dust mass was estimated around 0.007 or 0.031 M_{🜨} (0.57 to 2.5 Moon masses), depending on the grain size used for the modelling. Later modelling showed that the disk around PDS 70c is optically thick and has an estimated dust mass of 0.07 to 0.7 M_{🜨} (5.7 to 57 Moon masses). The total (dust+gas) mass of the disk should be higher. The planet's luminosity is the dominant heating mechanism within 0.6 AU of the CPD. Beyond that the photons from the star heat the disk. Observations with JWST NIRCam showed a large spiral-like feature near PDS 70c. This feature is only seen after the disk around PDS 70 was removed. Part of this spiral-like feature was interpreted as an accretion stream that feeds the circumplanetary disk around PDS 70c.

== See also ==
- Accretion disk – Structure formed by diffuse material in orbital motion around a massive central body
- Circumstellar envelope – Part of a star
- Disrupted planet – Planetary object disrupted by other body
- Extrasolar planet – Planet outside of the Solar System
- Formation and evolution of the Solar System
- Protoplanetary disk – Gas and dust surrounding a newly formed star
- Ring system – Ring of cosmic dust orbiting an astronomical object
