= 2MASS J11151597+1937266 =

Free-floating planet in the constellation Leo

2MASS J1115+1937
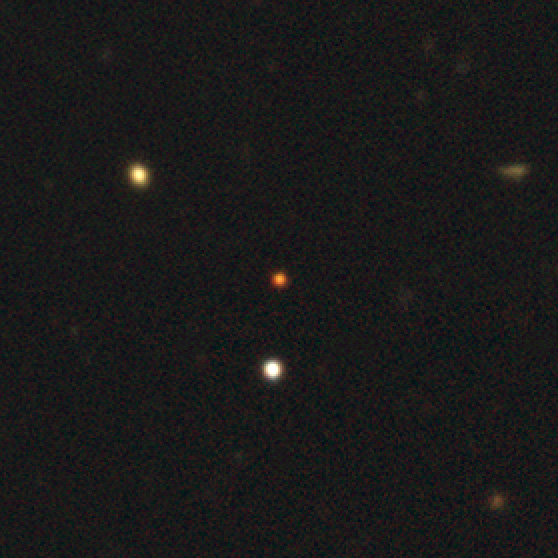
- 2MASS J11151597+1937266 (orange dot in the center); Credit: DESI legacy surveys DR10

Observation data Epoch J2000 Equinox J2000
- Constellation: Leo
- Right ascension: 11^{h} 15^{m} 15.97^{s}
- Declination: +19° 37′ 26.58″

Characteristics
- Evolutionary stage: sub-brown dwarf or brown dwarf
- Spectral type: L2γ ±1
- Apparent magnitude (G): 20.41 ± 0.02
- Variable type: spectroscopic variable

Astrometry
Radial velocity (R_{v})	−14±7 km/s
Proper motion (μ)	RA: -69.532 ±1.320 mas/yr Dec.: -25.212 ±1.483 mas/yr
Parallax (π)	22.1211±1.0742 mas
Distance	147 ± 7 ly (45 ± 2 pc)

Details
Mass	7–21 M_{J} 6+8 −4 M_{Jup}
Radius	1.5 ± 0.1 R_{Jup}
Surface gravity (log g)	3.63 ± 0.05 cgs
Temperature	1816 ± 63 K
Age	5–45 Myr

Other designations
- SDSS J111515.94+193726.4, TIC 159525899, Gaia DR3 3990192705824438144

Database references
SIMBAD	data

2MASS J11151597+1937266 (also called 2MASS J1115+1937) is a young isolated planetary-mass object that is surrounded by a planetary disk.

2MASS J1115+1937 was discovered in 2017 in the LaTE-MoVeRS survey (Late-Type Extension to the Motion Verified Red Stars), which combined 2MASS, SDSS and WISE data to search for faint moving stars. The spectral fit showed that it is an L dwarf, with low gravity. A spectral type of L2γ was assigned for 2MASS J1115+1937. This work did not find a match with any known stellar associations and suggested it might have been ejected from such an association in the past. Infrared spectroscopy from the NASA Infrared Telescope Facility was published in 2018. This team found a spectral type of L2γ (±1) and an age of 5–45 Million years (Myr). The upper age limit is determined by the maximum age at which low-mass stars accrete material (see Peter Pan disk), but 2MASS J1115+1937 could be younger than this upper limit. Using this age range the team found a mass range of 7 to 21 M_{J}. Additional follow-up was presented in 2024 with the Very Large Telescope (VLT), UVES instrument. The mass remains uncertain, but using the pre-shock velocity (120+80
−40 km/s) the team found a mass of 6+8
−4 M_{J}.

The near-infrared spectrum shows water vapor (H_{2}O), carbon monoxide (CO), iron hydride (FeH), sodium (Na) and potassium (K). The optical spectrum shows hydrogen and helium emission. It also shows possibly metal absorption lines of calcium (Ca), iron (Fe), titanium (Ti) and chromium (Cr).

== The accretion disk ==
The discovery team showed that the SDSS spectrum contained a number of hydrogen emission lines and the H-alpha emission line was broadened, showing signs of accretion. The team found that the neutral potassium line was weaker than other low gravity dwarfs, which is seen as either an even lower gravity or material blocking this part of the atmosphere. Additionally a higher than normal WISE W3 (about 10 μm) flux indicates the presence of dust around the object. In a follow-up paper, the team interpreted the hydrogen emission as either magnetic activity and/or weak accretion. The team also found emission due to neutral helium (He), which is another sign of accretion. Observations with the VLT confirmed the ongoing accretion and the infrared excess. The team identified additional hydrogen emission lines and found asymmetric line profiles. The H-alpha flux decreased by about 7% between 2007 and 2012, and then increased by about 20% between 2012 and 2023. This is seen as a variable accretion rate. The mass accretion rate was estimated to be 1.4+2.8
−0.9×10^{−8} M_{J}/year (about three times the mass of the asteroid Juno per year).

== Ruled out stellar companion ==
It was suggested that 2MASS J1115+1937 co-moves with 2MASS J11131089+2110086 (2MASS J1113+2110) based on similar proper motion and radial velocity. Due to newly released Gaia astrometry, especially the difference in parallax, another team ruled out that the two 2MASS objects are a physical pair. The team does however consider it possible that the pair has a similar dynamical origin. Maybe the two objects belong to an unknown stellar group.

== See also ==
Other free-floating planetary-mass objects with disks (all more distant than 2MASS J1115+1937)

- OTS 44, one of the first discovered planetary-mass objects
- Cha 110913−773444
- J1407b, could also orbit a star
- KPNO-Tau 12
- Cha 1107−7626

Other planetary-mass objects with disks that bound to a star

- SR 12c
- Delorme 1 (AB)b
- 2M1207b
- PDS 70c, first circumplanetary disk
