= J1407b =

Disked object in the constellation Centaurus

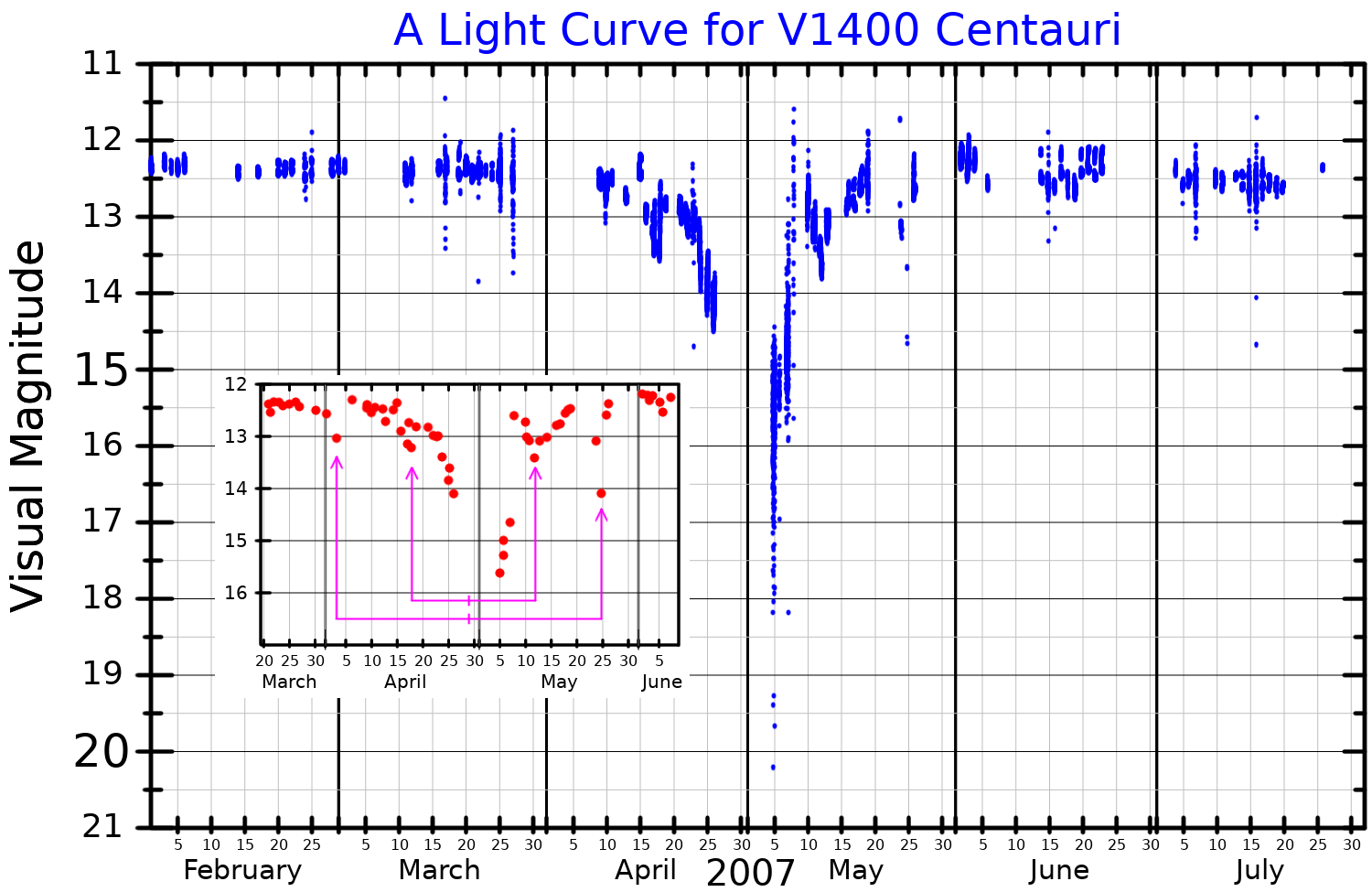
- Light curve of V1400 Centauri showing a series of dimmings during 2007, which are thought to be caused by J1407b eclipsing the star.

Observation data Epoch J2000 Equinox ICRS
- Constellation: Centaurus
- Right ascension: 14^{h} 07^{m} 47.92976^{s}
- Declination: −39° 45′ 42.7671″

Database references
SIMBAD	data

J1407b is an astronomical object proposed to explain a series of eclipse-like dimming events observed in the star V1400 Centauri during 2007. These dimming events were recorded by automated telescopes that year but were not identified until 2010, when Mark Pecaut and Eric Mamajek analyzed the data. J1407b was initially thought to be a planet with a massive ring system orbiting V1400 Centauri, but no new eclipses have been observed, nor do historical photographic plates show evidence for eclipses in the last century, so this explanation is unlikely. Astronomers have alternatively proposed that J1407b might have been a free-floating substellar object, possibly a sub-brown dwarf, with a protoplanetary disk that coincidentally eclipsed V1400 Centauri, the most likely hypothesis to date.

J1407b's hypothetical disk spans a radius of about 90 million km (0.60 AU; 56 million mi) and consists of many rings and gaps which may indicate the formation of moons in orbit around the object. Follow-up observations have attempted to detect J1407b via high-resolution imaging, but found no object. The non-detection of J1407b places constraints on the nature of its disk, ruling out one dominated by grains with sizes over one millimeter.

== 2007 dimming and discovery ==
During 7 April to 4 June 2007, (Note: According to van Werkhoven et al. (2014), J1407b's eclipse start and end times are Modified Julian Date (MJD) 54197 and 54255, respectively. To convert these to Julian date (JD), add 2400000.5 to MJD. This gives JD 2454197.5 and JD 2454255.5 for the eclipse start and end times, respectively. Converting these JD dates to calendar dates gives 7 April 2007 UTC and 4 June 2007 UTC, respectively.) telescopes of the Super Wide Angle Search for Planets (SuperWASP) and All Sky Automated Survey (ASAS) projects automatically recorded V1400 Centauri undergoing a series of significant dimming events for 56 days. The pattern of these dimming events was complex yet nearly symmetrical, suggesting they were caused by an opaque, disk-like structure eclipsing the star. The light curve of V1400 Centauri during 2007 showed at least five major dimming events, including one long and very deep central eclipse bracketed by two pairs of shorter eclipses symmetrically occurring 12 days and 26 days before and after the middle of the deep eclipse. The deep eclipse lasted about 14 days and blocked out at least 95% of V1400 Centauri's light, causing it to dim by at least 3.3 magnitudes. (Note: The magnitude difference of two different flux (brightness) values is given by the equation Δm = –2.5log(F_{2}/F_{1}). In the context of V1400 Centauri, F_{1} is its pre-eclipse brightness and F_{2} is its mid-eclipse brightness. The ratio of brightnesses F_{2}/F_{1} represents how much the star dimmed relative to its pre-eclipse brightness. Rearranging the equation for F_{2}/F_{1} gives F_{2}/F_{1} = 10^{–Δm/2.5}. For the Δm = 3.3 deep eclipse, V1400 Centauri dimmed to roughly F_{2}/F_{1} = 5% of its pre-eclipse brightness (or 95% of its light blocked). For the Δm = 1.0 eclipse, V1400 Centauri dimmed to roughly F_{2}/F_{1} = 40% of its pre-eclipse brightness (or 60% of its light blocked). These calculations can be verified by looking at the normalized flux plot shown in Figure 6 of van Werkhoven et al. (2014).) The short eclipses before and after the deep eclipse blocked out at least 60% of the star's light, causing it to dim by at least 1 magnitude.

The event was not noticed until 3 December 2010, when Mark J. Pecaut, a graduate student of Eric E. Mamajek at the University of Rochester, discovered V1400 Centauri's 2007 dimming while investigating SuperWASP's public light curve database. Pecaut and Mamajek were originally intending to use the SuperWASP data to check for brightness variability in candidate low-mass stars of the Scorpius–Centaurus association, which they had been studying since 2009. Mamajek, Pecaut, and collaborators presented their discovery of V1400 Centauri's dimming in January 2012 at the 219th American Astronomical Society conference in Austin, Texas, and then formally published their results in The Astronomical Journal in March 2012.

== Name ==
The object was first dubbed "J1407b" in a paper published by Tim van Werkhoven, Matthew Kenworthy, and Eric Mamajek in 2014, which assumed the object was orbiting V1400 Centauri as an exoplanet. The name J1407b follows the exoplanet naming convention by adding the letter "b" after the host star's name. At the time of J1407b's discovery, V1400 Centauri was known as "J1407", which is the shortened form of the star's full SuperWASP catalogue designation 1SWASP J140747.93–394542.6. This designation shows the star's location in the sky in equatorial coordinates.

== Disk and potential exomoons ==
Simulation of J1407b eclipsing V1400 Centauri (center) during 2007. The light curve plot below illustrates V1400 Centauri's brightness changes during the eclipse. The ring structure of J1407b and the orange light curve represents a best-fit model to SuperWASP's photometric data, which are shown in yellow points.

The long duration and symmetrical nature of V1400 Centauri's dimming in 2007 led astronomers to suspect that it was caused by an object with a massive disk eclipsing the star, which became known as J1407b. This idea was first proposed by Mamajek's team in their 2012 paper describing their discovery of J1407b. The disk of J1407b may be considered a circumplanetary disk or a large ring system. J1407b has not been detected in radio waves, which indicates that its disk is not thick and is likely composed of particles smaller than 1 millimeter.

The rate of V1400 Centauri's 2007 dimming suggests that J1407b and its disk were moving at a transverse velocity of 35 km/s (22 mi/s) relative to the star, which indicates that J1407b's disk has a radius of 0.6 astronomical units (90 million km; 56 million mi). This makes J1407b's disk roughly 200 times larger than that of Saturn's E Ring (Note: The outer edge of Saturn's E Ring is approximately 480,000 km (300,000 mi) in radius from Saturn. For J1407b, the outer edge of its circumplanetary disk is 90 million km (56 million mi) in radius, which is approximately 188 times that of Saturn's E Ring.) and between the orbital radii of Mercury (0.39 AU) and Venus (0.72 AU). J1407b's circumplanetary disk or ring system has been frequently compared to that of Saturn's, which has led popular media outlets to dub it as a "Super Saturn" or a "Saturn on steroids".

The radius of the disk extends far beyond J1407b's Roche limit at 0.001 AU (150 thousand km; 93 thousand mi), which allows exomoons (or exoplanets if J1407b is a brown dwarf) to form within the disk, as evidenced by gaps seen in J1407b's disk. J1407b's disk is tilted by 13° relative to the plane of J1407b's path and Earth's line of sight, which explains its nearly-symmetrical eclipse light curve and differing time durations between eclipse ingress and egress. Variations in V1400 Centauri's dimming rate during the eclipses suggest that J1407b's disk has a height-to-radius ratio of approximately 0.0015, which corresponds to a vertical disk thickness of 0.0009 AU (130 thousand km; 84 thousand mi). (Note: Multiplying J1407b's disk radius (r = 0.6 AU by the height-to-radius ratio h/r = 0.0015 gives h = 0.0009 AU for height.)

The varying depths of J1407b's eclipses indicate that its disk consists of various concentric rings and gaps of different opacities. A 2015 analysis of J1407b's eclipse light curve by Kenworthy and Mamajek found that J1407b's disk comprises at least 37 distinct rings with radii ranging from 0.2 to 0.6 AU (30 to 90 million km; 19 to 56 million mi). The innermost ring of J1407b's disk extends out to a radius of 0.206 AU (30.8 million km; 19.1 million mi) and is the most opaque region of the disk. Assuming the rings have a mass density proportional to their opacity, the total mass of J1407b's disk is roughly 100 lunar masses (1.23 Earth masses).

J1407b's disk has a 4-million km (2.5-million mi)-wide gap between radii 0.396 to 0.421 AU (59.2 to 63.0 million km; 36.8 to 39.1 million mi), which is believed to have been created by a nearly-Earth-sized (<0.8 M_{🜨}) exomoon orbiting within that gap and clearing out material, in a similar fashion to the shepherd moons of Saturn's rings. Another smaller, 1-million km (0.62-million mi)-wide gap in J1407b's disk between radii 0.354 to 0.360 AU (53.0 to 53.9 million km; 32.9 to 33.5 million mi) is also believed to have been created by an exomoon orbiting inside that gap. Other possible mechanisms for creating J1407b's disk gaps, such as orbital resonances between multiple exomoons, are deemed unlikely because they cannot produce other observed features of J1407b's disk. Altogether, the presence of rings and gaps outside J1407b's Roche limit combined with evidence of possible exomoons suggests that J1407b's disk is currently in the process of accreting into more exomoons, and will eventually become a satellite system (or a planetary system if J1407b is a brown dwarf) in less than a few billion years.

== Bound companion hypothesis ==
In their 2012 paper describing the discovery of J1407b, Mamajek's team proposed that J1407b could be a ringed substellar object or exoplanet orbiting V1400 Centauri, because the star is young enough that a dense disk of dust could theoretically exist around it and any massive companions orbiting it. Although it is now considered less likely, the hypothesis of J1407b being a ringed substellar companion or exoplanet of V1400 Centauri was popularized by Mamajek and Kenworthy in 2015, when they announced their research on J1407b in a press release published by their respective universities.

=== Proposed orbit ===
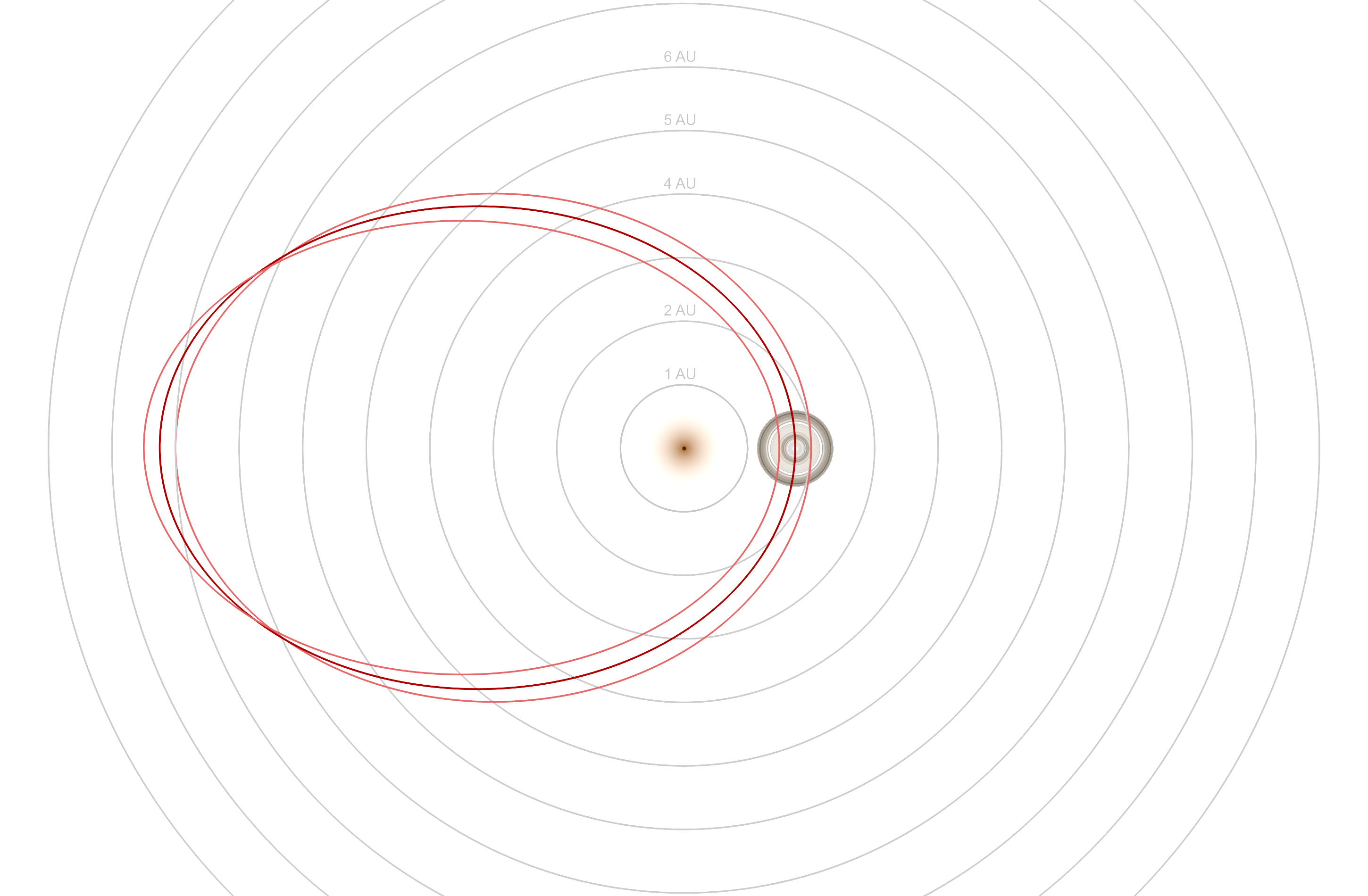
Diagram of the hypothesized V1400 Centauri planetary system, with J1407b's circumplanetary disk shown to scale. The range of possible elliptical orbits for J1407b is shown in red.

Following the assumption that J1407b is orbiting V1400 Centauri, its apparent transverse speed of 35 km/s (22 mi/s) during the 2007 eclipse should be the same as its orbital speed around the star. This orbital speed allows for a range of possible orbital periods depending on J1407b's orbital eccentricity: if J1407b has a circular orbit with a constant orbital speed, then it would have an orbital period around 200 days, whereas if J1407b's orbit is more elliptical with a varying orbital speed, then it could have longer orbital periods of up to several years.

Continuous observations of V1400 Centauri's brightness after 2007 did not show any signs of eclipse-like dimming, which rules out the possibility of near-circular and short-period orbits for J1407b. A more extensive analysis of V1400 Centauri's brightness in archival observations from 1890 to 1990 similarly found no signs of eclipses, ruling out 90% of possible orbital periods between 10 and 20 years for J1407b. Although these observations do not rule out the possibility of orbital periods longer than 25 years, such long orbital periods are considered unlikely because they require an extremely eccentric orbit for J1407b, which would destabilize J1407b's disk. Overall, these constraints suggest a probable orbital period range of 14–17 years (with the most probable orbital periods around 16.5–17 years) if J1407b orbits V1400 Centauri. For this orbital period range, J1407b's orbital eccentricity must be between 0.72 and 0.78.

The V1400 Centauri planetary system
Companion (in order from star)	Mass	Semimajor axis (AU)	Orbital period (days)	Eccentricity	Inclination (°)	Radius
b (disputed)	5–20 M_{J}	>5.0±0.1 AU (for >11 yr orbital period)	14–17 yr (5110–6200 d)	0.72–0.78	89.995°	—

=== Problems with the hypothesis ===
A 2016 study by Steven Rieder and Matthew Kenworthy investigated the orbital dynamics of J1407b's postulated eccentric orbit and found that the disk of J1407b either fills a large fraction of or extends beyond J1407b's Hill radius (extent of J1407b's gravitational influence against V1400 Centauri) regardless of its mass, which meant that J1407b's disk could be easily destabilized by V1400 Centauri's gravitational influence whenever it makes its closest approach to the star at periapsis. To remedy the issue with J1407b's disk stability in an eccentric orbit, Rieder and Kenworthy proposed that J1407b must be a brown dwarf of at least 20 Jupiter masses (M_{J}) and its disk must orbit J1407b in retrograde motion, opposite to the direction J1407b orbits its host star. A retrograde-orbiting disk would survive longer against V1400 Centauri's gravitational influence, although it would still slowly shrink over timescales of 10,000 years. Rieder and Kenworthy suggested that the lifetime of a retrograde-orbiting disk could be prolonged by dust-producing processes such as tidal disruption of comets around J1407b. A 2018 study found that a lower mass of 5–20 Jupiter masses would be marginally consistent with the observations.

Despite the better stability of a retrograde-orbiting disk, it could not explain why J1407b's disk is flat and tilted relative to its postulated orbit around V1400 Centauri. The star's gravitational influence is strong enough to realign J1407b's disk to its orbital plane instead of J1407b's equator, which would result in significant warping of J1407b's disk. In addition to this issue, the origin of a retrograde-orbiting disk together with J1407b's postulated eccentric orbit could not be easily explained by current theories for planetary formation. If J1407b is a companion that formed in orbit around V1400 Centauri, then its disk is expected to be prograde, orbiting J1407b in the same direction as its orbit around the star.

One hypothesis to explain J1407b's supposed eccentric orbit proposes that V1400 Centauri could have another undetected substellar companion that is orbiting beyond J1407b and gravitationally perturbing its orbit. However, the existence of additional substellar companions beyond the distance of J1407b's supposed orbit had already been shown to be unlikely by Mamajek's team, who attempted a search for J1407b using various telescopes during 2012–2013. High-resolution imaging of V1400 Centauri in near-infrared light found no signs of J1407b or any brown dwarf-mass companions within a few AU from the star. Doppler spectroscopy of V1400 Centauri showed no evidence of radial velocity variations that would be caused by a >12 M_{J} companion orbiting the star. Furthermore, continuous observations of V1400 Centauri's brightness over a 19-year timespan between 2001 and 2020 found no evidence of transits by Jupiter-sized exoplanets or substellar companions before and after J1407b's 2007 eclipse. Overall, the lack of recurring eclipses, non-detections of orbiting companions, and complications in explaining J1407b's eccentric orbit and disk stability suggest that J1407b likely does not orbit V1400 Centauri and is instead a free-floating object.

== Unbound object hypothesis ==
In a 2015 study, Mamajek and Kenworthy initially rejected the idea of J1407b being a free-floating object because they thought it was unlikely. Their reasoning was that stars and other interstellar objects are typically separated extremely far apart from each other (projected distance ~1,000 AU), so the probability of two unbound objects coincidentally being aligned in Earth's line of sight and eclipsing one another is extremely small. They further argued that the existence of J1407b's massive disk implies that the object must be considerably younger than the stars surrounding its location, which makes it difficult to explain J1407b's origin. They reconsidered their stance on J1407b's nature as they uncovered issues with the bound companion hypothesis.

=== Searches with telescope imaging ===
==== 2017 ALMA imaging ====
In 2017, Kenworthy and collaborators conducted a search for J1407b using the Atacama Large Millimeter Array (ALMA), which is capable of detecting thermal radiation from ringed substellar objects in millimeter radio frequencies. High-resolution radio images from ALMA showed no evidence of bound companions within 100 milliarcseconds (mas) from the star, but did detect a nearby object 438±8 mas away from V1400 Centauri's observed position. At V1400 Centauri's distance from Earth, this angular separation corresponds to a projected distance of 61 AU, which is too far away from the star to match the proposed orbit for J1407b. The observed angular separation of this ALMA object appeared marginally consistent with the expected distance (543±82 mas) travelled by an unbound object moving at J1407b's transverse velocity during 2007–2017, which raised the possibility that the ALMA object could be J1407b if it is a free-floating object. If the ALMA source is J1407b, it would have a proper motion of 43 mas/year, which would suggest it is not part of the Scorpius–Centaurus association. The brightness of the ALMA object appeared to be consistent with that expected for a substellar object surrounded by a warm disk of submillimeter-sized dust particles.

==== Follow-up and non-detection ====
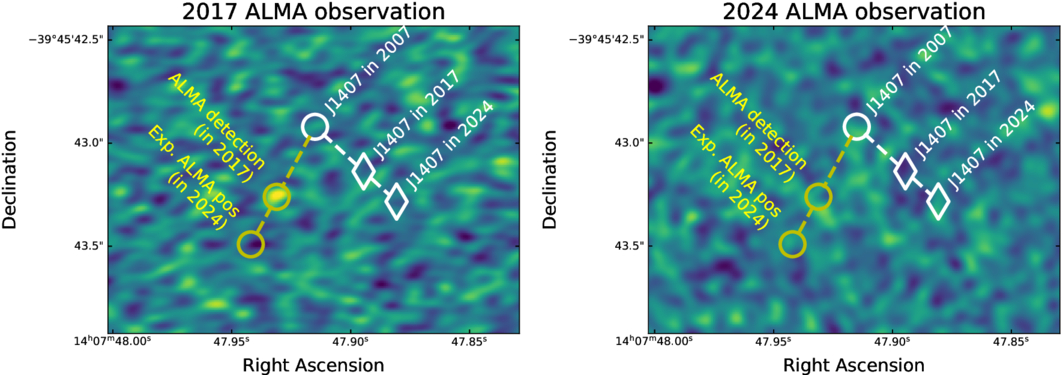
ALMA radio images of J1407b's expected location in 2017 (left panel) and 2024 (right panel), showing no conclusive detection of J1407b. The bright spot circled in the 2017 image did not reappear in the 2024 image, so it is likely not a real object.

In 2019, Kenworthy and collaborators attempted a follow-up search for J1407b using high-resolution imaging by the Very Large Telescope. These images, which were taken in near-infrared light, did not detect the ALMA object and showed no signs of >6 M_{J} substellar objects beyond 30 AU (0.25 arcseconds) nor >4 M_{J} objects beyond 100 AU (0.70 arcseconds) from V1400 Centauri. These non-detections in near-infrared wavelengths place an upper mass limit of <6 M_{J} for the ALMA object.

While the properties of the ALMA object appear to match those of J1407b, it has only been observed once, making it uncertain whether its motion aligns with the expected direction and speed.

In 2024, V1400 Centauri was observed again by ALMA and the results were published in 2025. No object was detected at the expected position, meaning that the 2017 detection was either noise or was caused by an object that dimmed afterward. The lack of a radio signal rules out the possibility that J1407b has a thick disk dominated by dust grains larger than 1 millimeter in size. However, it remains possible that J1407b could have either a thin or flared disk shape containing submillimeter-sized dust grains.

== See also ==
- List of transiting circumsecondary disks
- List of exomoon candidates
- HIP 41378 f, an exoplanet that likely has rings
- Examples of brown dwarfs/rogue planets surrounded by circumplanetary disks:
  - OTS 44
  - Cha 110913−773444
  - WISEA J120037.79-784508.3
  - 2MASS J11151597+1937266
  - KPNO-Tau 12
