= OTS 44 =

Brown dwarf in the constellation Chamaeleon

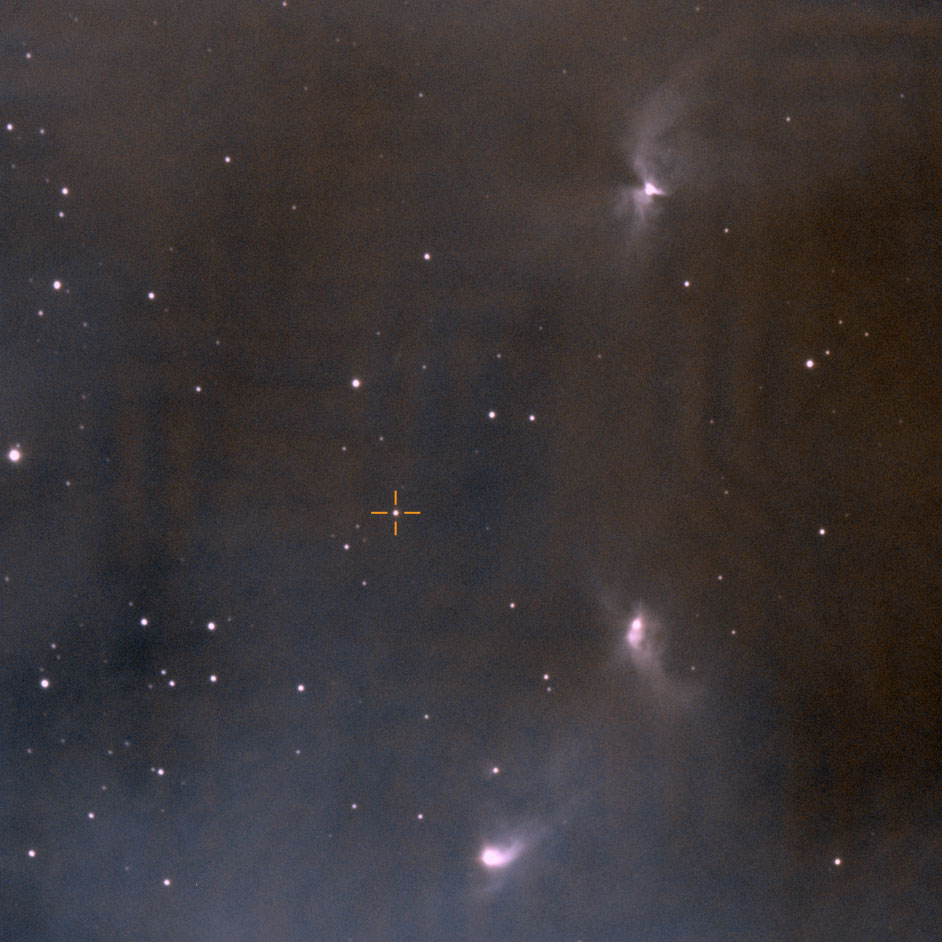
- OTS 44 (orange crosshair) and surrounding nebulae

Observation data Epoch J2000.0 Equinox ICRS
- Constellation: Chamaeleon
- Right ascension: 11^{h} 10^{m} 11.5^{s}
- Declination: −76° 32′ 13″

Characteristics
- Spectral type: M9.5±1.0

Astrometry
Distance	522–544 or 626 ly (160–170 or 192 pc)

Details
Mass	6–17 M_{J}, average 11.5 M_{Jup}
Radius	3.2 or 3.6 R_{Jup}
Luminosity	0.00126±0.00023 (Note: In Table of 8 of Bonnefoy et al. (2014), OTS 44's effective luminosity is given as a base 10 logarithm: −2.90±0.08. The luminosity of 0.00126±0.00023 L_{☉} can be obtained by taking 10 to the power of the aforementioned logarithm value; the uncertainty is calculated via propagation of error.) – 0.0024 L_{☉}
Temperature	1,700±100 K
Age	1–6 Myr

Other designations
- 2MASS J11100934–7632178, CHSM 16658, SSTgbs J1110093–763218, TIC 454329342, [GMM2009] Cha I 27

Database references
SIMBAD	data

OTS 44 is a young, free-floating planetary-mass brown dwarf, a "sub-brown dwarf", and rogue planet, located 520 to 630 light-years (160 to 192 parsecs) away in the star-forming molecular cloud Chamaeleon I in the constellation Chamaeleon. It is surrounded by a circumstellar disk of gas and dust, from which it is actively accreting mass at an approximate rate of 500 billion kilograms per second (or equivalently, 7.6×10^{−12} solar masses per year). With an estimated age between 1 and 6 million years, OTS 44 has not existed long enough to cool down, so it glows red with a temperature of around 1,700 K (1,430 °C; 2,600 °F) and a stellar spectral type of M9.5. It likely formed from the gravitational collapse of gas and dust, a similar process to how stars typically form.

The disk of OTS 44 is estimated to span at least several astronomical units in radius with a flared shape—decreasing in density but increasing in vertical thickness at farther distances from the object. OTS 44's disk contains a total estimated mass of approximately 0.1 Jupiter masses or 30 Earth masses, with a small fraction of this mass constituting dust in the disk. The disk of OTS 44 will possibly eventually coalesce to form a planetary system.

== Discovery ==
OTS 44 was discovered in images taken on 1–3 March 1996 by Japanese astronomers Yumiko Oasa, Motohide Tamura and Koji Sugitani, during a search for young stellar objects and brown dwarfs in the core of the Chamaeleon I molecular cloud. The discovery images were taken with the Cerro Tololo Inter-American Observatory's 1.5-metre (4.9 ft) telescope in Chile, which was equipped with the J, H and K filters to measure the near-infrared colors of these objects. The discoverers found 61 near-infrared-emitting objects and included them in their own catalogue, which became known as the Oasa–Tamura–Sugitani (OTS) catalogue.

OTS 44 was the 44th object and one of the dimmest objects listed in the OTS catalogue. The discoverers identified OTS 44 as a brown dwarf candidate because it appeared much dimmer and redder than other young stars in Chameleon I, which meant that it should have a very low mass if it shared the same age as these stars. The discoverers published their analysis and identification of OTS 44 as a brown dwarf candidate in the journal Science in November 1998.

In November 2004, Kevin L. Luhman, Dawn E. Peterson and S. Thomas Megeath announced the confirmation of OTS 44 as a low-mass brown dwarf. Using spectroscopic observations by the Gemini South telescope from March 2004, the researchers determined that OTS 44's mass lay close to the ~0.012-solar-mass (13-Jupiter-mass) boundary between giant planets and brown dwarfs, which made OTS 44 one of the least massive free-floating brown dwarfs confirmed at the time.

== Location and age ==
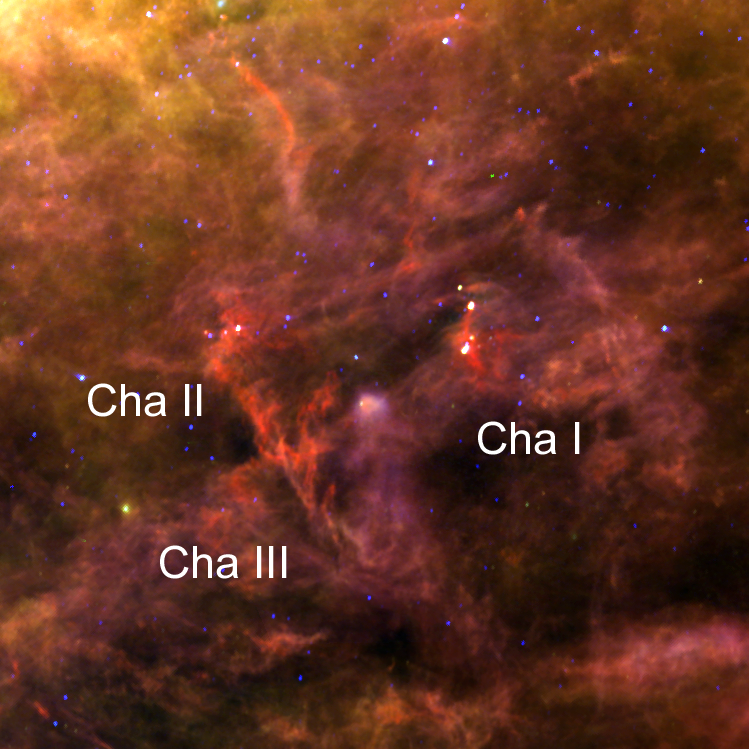
The Chamaeleon complex photographed in far infrared by the IRAS satellite. OTS 44 is located in the Chamaeleon I region.

OTS 44 is located in the constellation of Chamaeleon at a declination of approximately 76.5° south of the celestial equator. It is situated within the core of Chamaeleon I, one of the three major star-forming molecular clouds of the Chamaeleon complex. Chamaeleon I is one of the nearest star-forming regions to the Sun, at an estimated distance of either 160–170 parsecs (520–550 light-years) (according to 1999 parallax measurements by the Hipparcos satellite) or 192 pc (630 ly) (according to 2018 parallax measurements by the Gaia satellite). Astronomers assume that OTS 44 lies at the same distance as Chamaeleon I.

As a member of Chamaeleon I, OTS 44 is inferred to share the same age as other young stellar objects in the region, which are known to be between 1 and 6 million years old. At this age, substellar objects like OTS 44 are hot and luminous. Observations of active accretion around OTS 44 indicate that it formed in a similar process to how stars form—via direct gravitational collapse of concentrated gas and dust. OTS 44 will gradually cool and contract over time—becoming an L-type brown dwarf at about 10 million years of age, and then a Y dwarf after 1 billion years of age.

== Physical characteristics ==
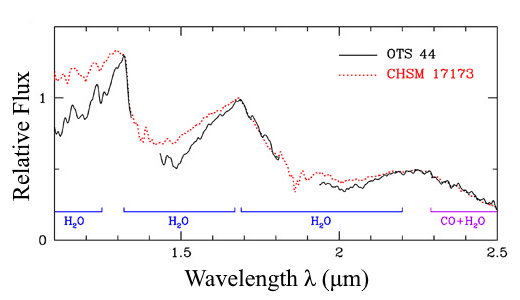
The near-infrared spectrum of OTS 44 (black) shows deep absorption bands due to steam (H_{2}O vapor) in its atmosphere. The spectrum of the M8-type brown dwarf CHSM 17173 (red) is shown for comparison.

The near-infrared spectrum of OTS 44 exhibits deep absorption bands caused by steam (water vapor) in its atmosphere, indicating a relatively cool temperature corresponding to a late spectral type of M9.5±1.0. Additional substances including elemental sodium (Na), potassium (K), iron hydride (FeH) and carbon monoxide (CO) have been spectroscopically detected in OTS 44's atmosphere. OTS 44 is estimated to have an effective temperature of 1,700 ± 100 K (1,427 ± 100 °C; 2,600 ± 180 °F), based on spectral energy distribution modeling with the object's atmospheric dust taken into account. OTS 44 stands out from cool main-sequence stars and red giants because it is much redder and brighter in near-infrared. Extinction by foreground dust has been observed to cause additional reddening in OTS 44's near-infrared colors (0.3±0.3-magnitude dimming in J-band), but not in its optical colors.

OTS 44 is a dim object with a luminosity between 0.001 and 0.002 times that of the Sun. As a young and hot object, OTS 44 is expected to have a radius larger than that of Jupiter. A Stefan–Boltzmann law calculation using OTS 44's luminosity and temperature suggests a "semi-empirical" radius of 3.5+0.6
−0.5 R_{J}, whereas a spectral energy distribution fit with OTS 44's disk taken into account suggests a radius between 3.2 and 3.6 R_{J}. OTS 44 is estimated to be 6–17 times more massive than Jupiter, though it is more likely below 13 Jupiter masses—in the planetary mass range, where it cannot fuse deuterium unlike brown dwarfs. Hence, astronomers have also categorized OTS 44 as a free-floating planet.

== Circumstellar disk ==
Cross-section diagram of the OTS 44's flared disk model proposed by Joergens et al. (2013)

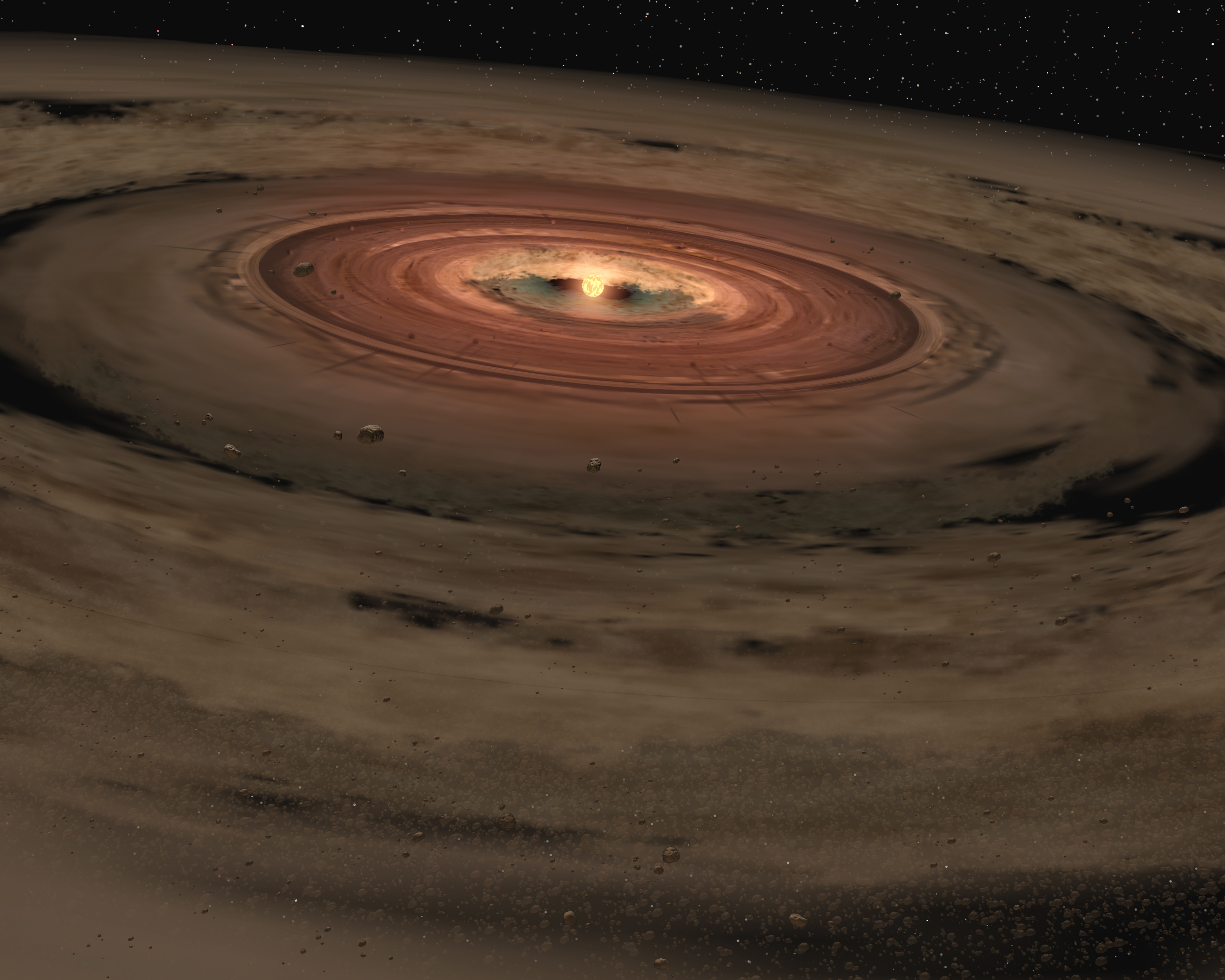
An artist's concept of OTS 44's dust disk

In February 2005, a team of astronomers led by Kevin Luhman announced the discovery of a circumstellar disk around OTS 44. Their discovery was based on the Spitzer Space Telescope's detection of excess mid-infrared thermal emission from OTS 44, which indicated the presence of warm dust surrounding the object. As one of the least massive free-floating objects known at the time, OTS 44 claimed the record for the least massive object known to have a circumstellar disk and demonstrated that such disks could exist around planetary-mass objects.

Estimates based on OTS 44's spectral energy distribution (SED) suggests that its disk contains a total mass of about 30 Earth masses. Observations with the SINFONI spectrograph at the Very Large Telescope show that OTS 44 is accreting matter from its disk at the rate of approximately 10^{−11} of the mass of the Sun per year. It could eventually develop into a planetary system.

Observations with ALMA detected OTS 44's disk in millimeter wavelengths. The observations constrained the dust mass of the disk between 0.07 and 0.63 M_{🜨}, but these mass estimates are limited by assumptions on poorly constrained parameters. Another work estimates the dust mass to 0.064 M_{🜨} (5.2 M_{☾}) for dust particles of 1 mm in size and 0.295 M_{🜨} (24 M_{☾}) for dust particles of 1 μm in size.

== See also ==
Other free-floating rogue planets and brown dwarfs with protoplanetary disks:

- Cha 110913−773444, rogue planet or brown dwarf surrounded by what appears to be a dusty disk
- Cha 1107−7626, a young rogue planet that underwent an episode of rapid accretion of material from its disk
- 2MASS J11151597+1937266, a young rogue planet or brown dwarf actively accreting material from its disk
- KPNO-Tau 12, another young rogue planet or brown dwarf that is actively accreting material from its disk
- J1407b, a possible disked object thought to have transited the star V1400 Centauri
