= 2MASS J0249−0557 =

Low mass binary brown dwarf

2MASS J0249−0557 AB
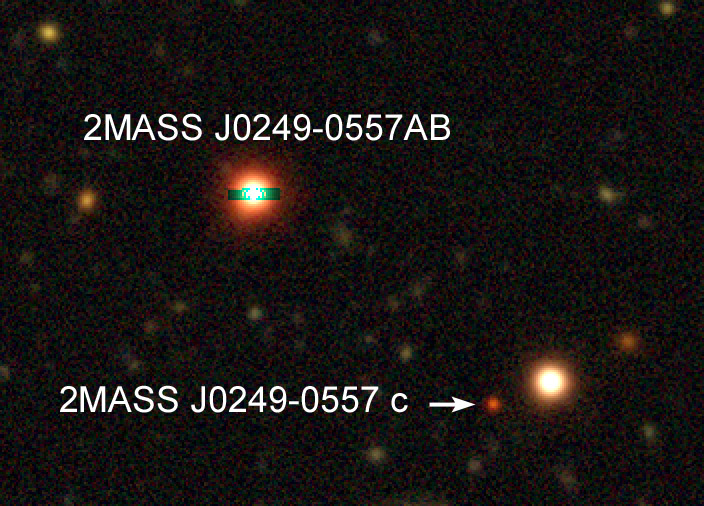
- 2MASS J0249−0557 AB and its companion Credit: Legacy Surveys / D. Lang (Perimeter Institute) & Meli_thev

Observation data Epoch J2000 Equinox J2000
- Constellation: Eridanus
- Right ascension: 02^{h} 49^{m} 56.39^{s}
- Declination: −05° 57′ 35.4″

Characteristics
- Evolutionary stage: brown dwarf
- Spectral type: M6+L2

Astrometry
Radial velocity (R_{v})	14.42 ±0.44 km/s
Proper motion (μ)	RA: 48.795 ±0.067 mas/yr Dec.: –35.211 ±0.057 mas/yr
Parallax (π)	15.0946±0.057 mas
Distance	216.1 ± 0.8 ly (66.2 ± 0.3 pc)

Position (relative to 2MASS J0249−0557 A)
Component	2MASS J0249−0557 B
Angular distance	0.0444 ±0.0002″
Position angle	233.1 ±0.3°
Projected separation	2.17 ±0.22 AU

Details

2MASS J0249−0557 A
Mass	48+13 −12 M_{Jup}
Luminosity (bolometric)	10^{–2.59 ±0.09} L_{☉}

2MASS J0249−0557 B
Mass	44+14 −11 M_{Jup}
Luminosity (bolometric)	10^{–2.64 ±0.09} L_{☉}

2MASS J0249−0557 c
Mass	11.38±0.77 M_{Jup}
Radius	0.159±0.003 R_{☉}
Radius	1.55±0.03 R_{Jup}
Temperature	1,723 K
Metallicity	$\begin{smallmatrix}\left[\ce{M}/\ce{H}\right]\end{smallmatrix}$ = 0.18±0.05
Rotational velocity (v sin i)	9.47±0.15 km/s

Other designations
- 2MASS J02495639−0557352, SDSS J024956.41−055735.7, TIC 10930507, Gaia DR2 5183875103632956032

Database references
SIMBAD	data
Exoplanet Archive	data

2MASS J0249−0557 (also known as 2MASS J02495639−0557352) is a young low-mass binary brown dwarf in the beta Pictoris moving group. It has one circumbinary planetary-mass companion, called 2MASS J0249−0557 (AB)c, or just 2MASS J0249−0557 c.

== The binary ==
The host was discovered as a member of the 22 ±6 Myr old beta Pictoris moving group in 2017 and a spectrum shows a spectral type of M6 with very low gravity. Keck Observatory adaptive optics aperture-masking interferometry showed that the primary 2MASS J0249−0557 is a binary. The binary is separated by 2.17 ±0.22 AU. 2MASS J0249−0557A has a mass of 48+13
−12 M_{J} and 2MASS J0249−0557B has a mass of 44+14
−11 M_{J}, making the host a binary of two brown dwarfs.

== The companion ==
The companion 2MASS J0249−0557 c (also known as 2MASS J02495436−0558015) was discovered in 2018 using astrometry from the Canada–France–Hawaii Telescope as a wide-separation companion, with a separation of 1950 ± 200 AU. Two near-infrared spectra were obtained. One from IRTF and the other from APO. A spectral type of L2 ±1 was assigned. Several spectral features show a low gravity, such as stronger VO and weaker FeH. The mass of the companion was estimated to be 11.6+1.3
−1.0 M_{J}, below the deuterium burning limit. The mass ration between companion and host binary is relative high (M_{comp}/M_{host}≥0.1), suggesting the system formed like a stellar triple. Unusual is the large separation of 2MASS J0249−0557 c. This could mean that it formed closer to the binary and was affected by turbulent fragmentation, which can lead to wide separations. A disfavoured alternative is that it formed in a disk around the binary and was scattered via dynamical interaction. Optical and near-infrared spectroscopy was obtained with the Gran Telescopio Canarias and the New Technology Telescope. This team also found evidence for low gravity in the form of strong absorption by oxides and weak absorption by alkali metals. Additionally the optical spectrum showed strong Hydrogen-alpha emission. This could indicate strong chromospheric activity or accretion from a disk around 2MASS J0249−0557 c. Strong H-alpha emission is more common in late M-dwarfs, but rare in young L-dwarfs. Other examples of L-dwarfs with strong H-alpha emission are 2MASS J11151597+1937266 and Delorme 1 (AB)b. A study using the instrument CRIRES+ on the Very Large Telescope found compositions consistent with other members of the beta Pictoris group. This supports formation via gravitational collapse.

== See also ==
- List of directly imaged exoplanets
- List of nearby stellar associations and moving groups
