= Sub-brown dwarf =

Astronomical objects of planetary size that did not form in orbit around a star

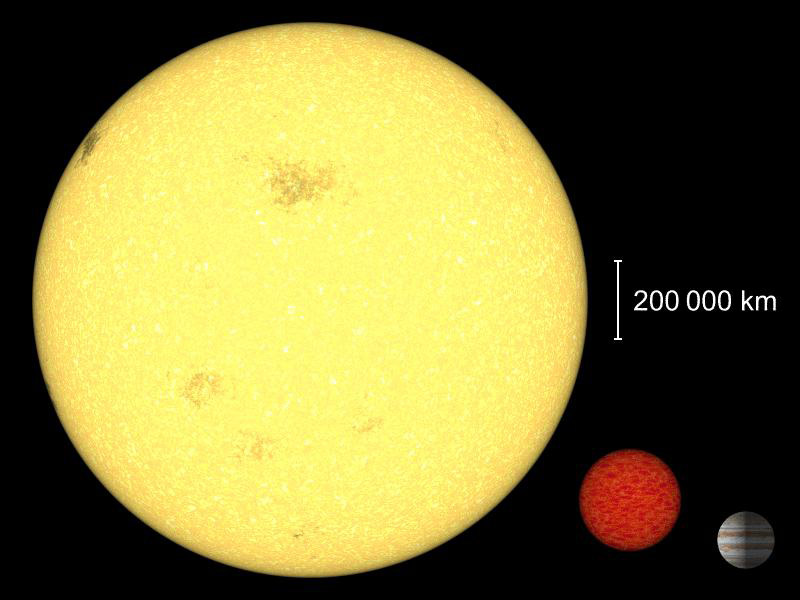
Comparison: the Sun (yellow), a young sub-brown dwarf (red), and Jupiter (multi-colored). As the sub-brown dwarf ages, it will gradually cool and shrink.

A sub-brown dwarf or planetary-mass brown dwarf is an astronomical object that formed in the same manner as stars and brown dwarfs (i.e. through the collapse of a gas cloud) but that has a planetary mass, therefore by definition below the limiting mass for thermonuclear fusion of deuterium (about 13 M_{J}). Some researchers include them in the category of rogue planets whereas others call them planetary-mass brown dwarfs.

== Description ==
Sub-brown dwarfs are formed in the manner of stars, through the collapse of a gas cloud (perhaps with the help of photo-erosion) but there is no consensus amongst astronomers on whether the formation process should be taken into account when classifying an object as a planet. Free-floating sub-brown dwarfs can be observationally indistinguishable from rogue planets, which originally formed around a star and were ejected from orbit. Similarly, a sub-brown dwarf formed free-floating in a star cluster may be captured into orbit around a star, making distinguishing sub-brown dwarfs and large planets also difficult. A definition for the term "sub-brown dwarf" was put forward by the IAU Working Group on Extra-Solar Planets (WGESP), which defined it as a free-floating body found in young star clusters below the lower mass cut-off of brown dwarfs.

=== Lower mass limit ===
The smallest mass of gas cloud that could collapse to form a sub-brown dwarf is about 1 Jupiter mass (M_{J}). This is because to collapse by gravitational contraction requires radiating away energy as heat and this is limited by the opacity of the gas. A 3 M_{J} candidate is described in a 2007 paper.

== List of possible sub-brown dwarfs ==
=== Orbiting one or more stars ===
There is no consensus whether these companions of stars should be considered sub-brown dwarfs or planets. Some authors agree these objects should be considered sub-brown dwarfs, since they likely formed on their own, like a "failed star".

- 2MASS J0441+2301 Bb

Nonetheless, the IAU working definition of an exoplanet ignored formation mechanism as a criterion, and based on it these objects would be considered planets.

- WD 0806-661 B
- HD 106906 b
- ROXs 42Bb

=== Orbiting a brown dwarf ===
At around 2022 the IAU working definition of an exoplanet excludes these objects as planets. The only fitting label would be as sub-brown dwarfs, but they are more often referred as planetary mass objects. Other definitions, like from the NASA Exoplanet Archive would include these as exoplanets. There is no consensus whether these companions of brown dwarfs should be considered sub-brown dwarfs or planets.

==== WISE J0336−0143B ====
WISE J0336−0143B orbits a brown dwarf or sub-brown dwarf. The primary has a mass of 8.5 to 18 M_{J} and secondary has a mass of 5-11.5 M_{J}. This object does not fit the IAU working definition of an exoplanet. This definition requires a mass ratio of about q<0.04, but the mass ratio of WISE J0336−0143AB is q=0.61±0.05. It also does not fit the definition of a rogue planet, because it is gravitationally bound to a brown dwarf (or possibly sub-brown dwarf). It could be considered a planet according to alternative definitions, but according to the IAU it only fits the definition of sub-brown dwarf.

==== 2M1207b ====
2M1207b orbits around a young brown dwarf with a circumstellar disk and itself is likely surrounded by a circumstellar disk. The mass ratio is well above the upper limit of q=0.04 for exoplanets according to the IAU.

==== Others ====
Other examples of planetary-mass objects orbiting brown dwarfs and with M_{B}<13 M_{J} and q>0.04:

- CFHTWIR-Oph 98B, with M_{B}=11.6+0.4
  −0.8 M_{J} and q=0.509+0.017
  −0.023
- 2MASS J0249-0557ABc, with M_{c}=11.6+1.3
  −1.0 M_{J} and $q={M_{c} \over M_{AB}}=0.13$

=== Free-floating ===
Also called rogue planets:

- WISE 0855–0714 3–10 M_{J} about 7 light years away
- S Ori 52
- UGPS 0722-05 10–25 M_{J} 13 light years away
- Cha 110913-773444 5–15 M_{J} 163 light years away
- CFBDSIR 2149−0403 4–7 M_{J} 130 light years away
- OTS 44 11.5 M_{J} 550 light years away
- PSO J318.5−22 6–8 M_{J} about 80 light years away
- Cha 1107−7626 6-10 M_{J} 620 light years away
- J1407b 5–20 M_{J} 451 light years away

== See also ==
- Brown dwarf
- Fusor (astronomy)
- Giant planet
- Hot Jupiter
- Red dwarf
- Rogue planet
- Substellar object
- List of planet types
- Lists of astronomical objects
