= IC 2631 =

Reflection nebula in Chamaeleon

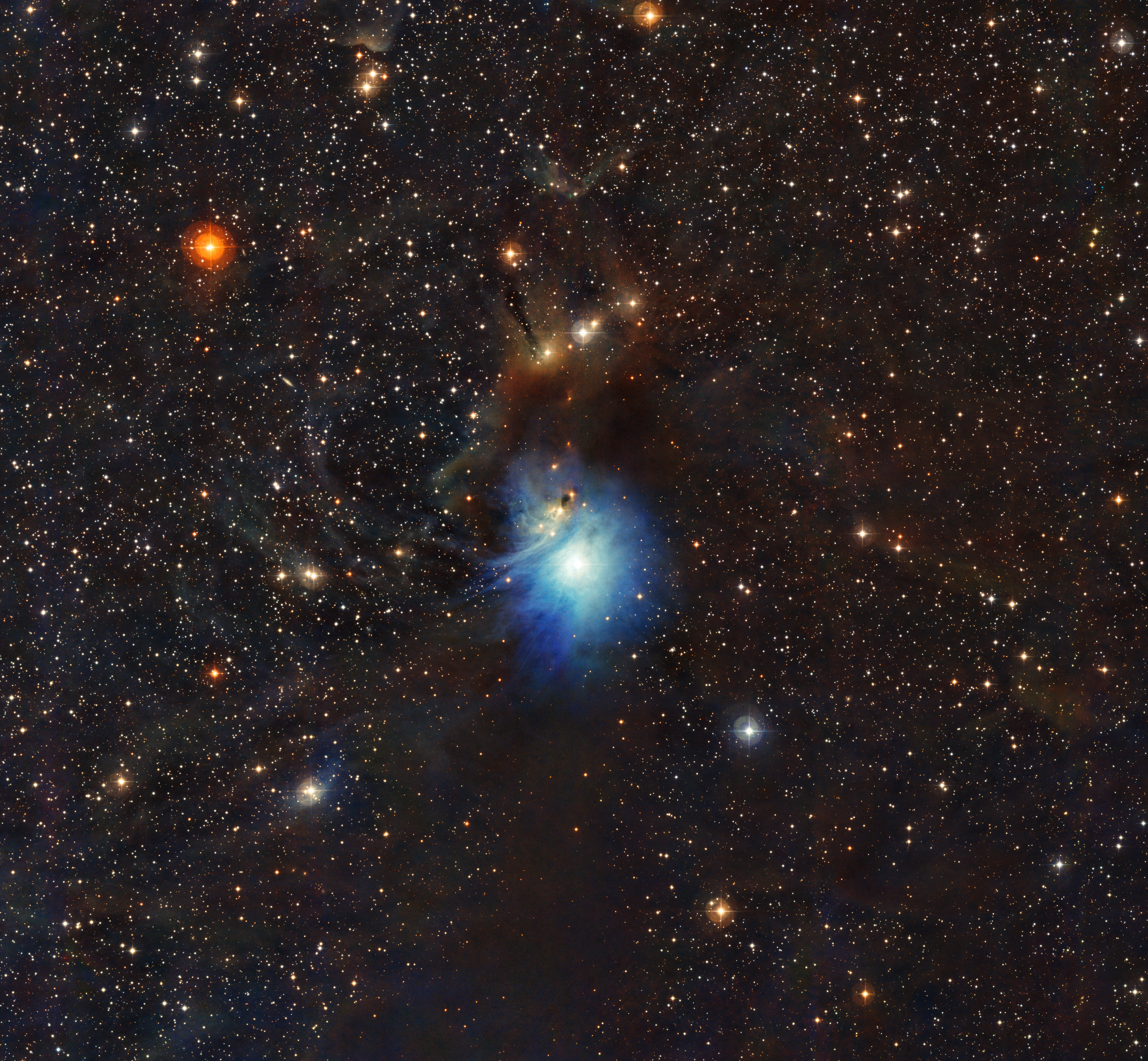
Young star lights up reflection nebula IC 2631

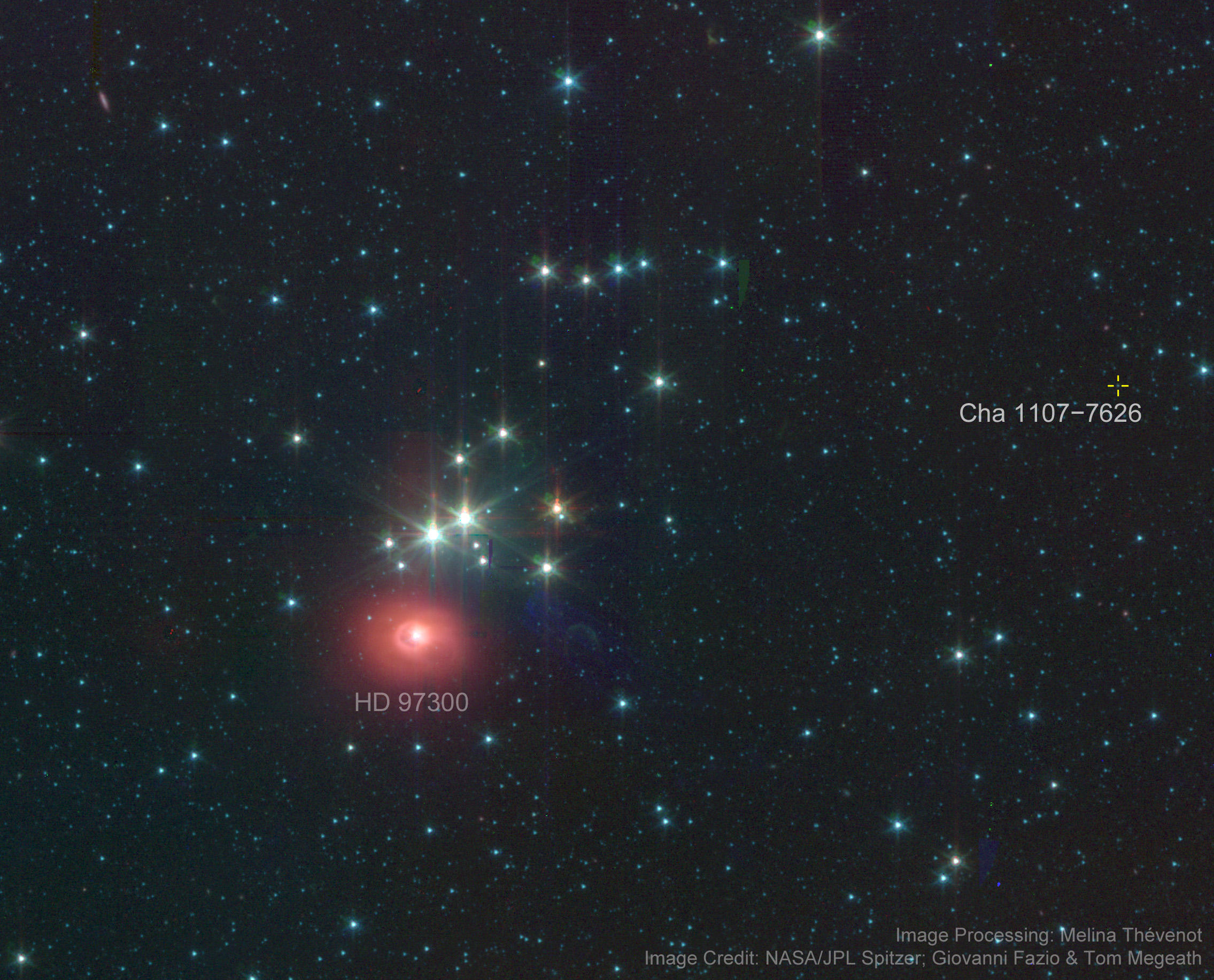
IC 2631 in infrared with the Spitzer Space Telescope. The ring around HD 97300 is seen. This image also shows the position of Cha 1107−7626, a planetary-mass object.

IC 2631 or Chamaeleon Cloud is a bright reflection nebula in the southern constellation of Chamaeleon. The nebula is lit up by a massive pre-main sequence star called HD 97300 at a distance of ~630 light years. It can be found 14.9° above the galactic plane of the Milky Way. IC 2631 can be easily seen in the southern hemisphere for the most part of the year.

HD 97300 is surrounded by a bubble seen in infrared with Spitzer and Herschel Space Telescopes.
