= V1400 Centauri =

Young sun-like star in the constellation Centaurus

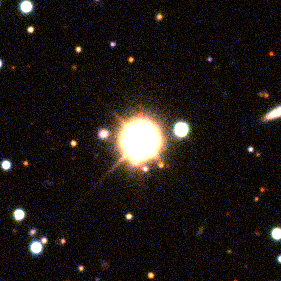
- V1400 Centauri imaged by the Dark Energy Survey

Observation data Epoch J2000 Equinox ICRS
- Constellation: Centaurus
- Right ascension: 14^{h} 07^{m} 47.92976^{s}
- Declination: −39° 45′ 42.7671″
- Apparent magnitude (V): 12.2–15.6

Characteristics
- Evolutionary stage: Pre-main sequence
- Spectral type: K5 IVe Li
- Variable type: rotational T Tau and eclipsing

Astrometry
Radial velocity (R_{v})	5.904±0.151 km/s
Proper motion (μ)	RA: −23.108±0.015 mas/yr Dec.: −21.048±0.017 mas/yr
Parallax (π)	7.2351±0.0140 mas
Distance	450.8 ± 0.9 ly (138.2 ± 0.3 pc)

Details
Mass	0.977+0.023 −0.045 M_{☉}
Radius	1.066+0.006 −0.014 R_{☉}
Luminosity	0.3431+0.0067 −0.0064 L_{☉}
Surface gravity (log g)	4.302±0.024 cgs
Temperature	4343+24 −29 K
Metallicity [Fe/H]	−0.190+0.045 −0.042 dex
Rotation	3.206±0.002 d (Note: 3.206±0.002 d is the median rotation period of V1400 Centauri throughout its 5.4-year magnetic activity cycle.)
Rotational velocity (v sin i)	14.6±0.4 km/s
Age	21.4+4.3 −7.6 Myr

Other designations
- V1400 Cen, GSC 07807-00004, 2MASS J14074792–3945427, WISE J140747.91–394542.9, 1SWASP J140747.93–394542.6, ASAS J140748–3945.7

Database references
SIMBAD	data

V1400 Centauri, also known as 1SWASP J140747.93−394542.6 or simply J1407, is a young, 20-million-year-old pre-main-sequence star that underwent a series of extreme dimming events in April–June 2007. These dimming events, which never appeared again, were thought to have been caused by an eclipse of a disked object known as J1407b. The star is about as massive as the Sun and is located in the constellation Centaurus at a distance of 451 light-years away. V1400 Centauri is a member of Upper Centaurus–Lupus subgroup of the Scorpius–Centaurus association, a group of young, comoving stars close to the Sun.

== Name and catalogue history ==
The star has been catalogued in as early as the 1990s by the Hubble Guide Star Catalog, which identified the star and measured its position in a pair of photographic plates taken in 1974 and 1979. The star has been catalogued by other sky surveys, including the All Sky Automated Survey (ASAS), Two Micron All-Sky Survey (2MASS), Super Wide Angle Search for Planets (1SWASP), and the Wide-field Infrared Survey Explorer (WISE). Typically in these catalogues, the star is given designations such as 1SWASP J140747.93–394542.6, which comprises the survey name followed by the star's location in equatorial coordinates. As such designations can be unwieldy, researchers simply call the star "J1407".

The star was given the official variable star designation V1400 Centauri in 2015, when it was added to the International Astronomical Union's General Catalogue of Variable Stars. A 2018 research paper on stars with unusual dimming periods nicknamed V1400 Centauri "Mamajek's Object", after the astronomer Eric Mamajek who identified the star's unusual dimming in 2007.

== Stellar properties ==
=== Location and age ===
Location of V1400 Centauri in the constellation Centaurus

V1400 Centauri is located in the constellation Centaurus, about 40 degrees south of the celestial equator. The most recent parallax measurements by the Gaia spacecraft indicate V1400 Centauri is located 450.8 ± 0.9 light-years (138.2 ± 0.3 parsecs) from the Sun. Observations of V1400 Centauri's position over time have shown that it has a southwestward (Note: Proper motion is split into right ascension (RA) and declination (Dec) components. By convention, positive RA is eastward and positive Dec is northward in the equatorial coordinate system. The measured proper motion components of V1400 Centauri are −23.108±0.015 mas/yr and −21.048±0.017 mas/yr in RA and Dec, respectively. Since both RA and Dec components of V1400 Centauri's proper motion are negative, its proper motion is pointed towards the west and south directions, hence southwest.) proper motion consistent with that of the Scorpius–Centaurus association, an OB association of young stars with ages between 11–17 million years and distances between 380–470 ly (118–145 pc) from the Sun. The Scorpius–Centaurus association is the nearest OB association to the Sun, and is believed to have formed out of a molecular cloud that has since been blown away by the stellar winds of the association's most massive stars.

V1400 Centauri is closest to the Upper Centaurus–Lupus subgroup of the Scorpius–Centaurus association, which has an age range of 14–18 million years and distance range of 380–460 ly (115–141 pc). Given V1400 Centauri's similar distance and proper motion, it very likely belongs to the Scorpius–Centaurus association, which would mean it must be a young star within the age range of the Upper Centaurus–Lupus subgroup. A 2012 estimate of V1400 Centauri's age assumes it is equal to 16 million years, the mean age of the Upper Centaurus–Lupus subgroup, while a 2018 estimate from Gaia measurements puts the star's age at 21.4+4.3
−7.6 million years.

=== Spectral type and physical characteristics ===
V1400 Centauri is a pre-main sequence star of spectral class K5 IVe Li. "K" means V1400 Centauri is an orange K-type star, and the adjoining number "5" ranks V1400 Centauri's relative temperature on a scale of 9 (coolest) to 0 (hottest) for K-type stars. V1400 Centauri is given the subgiant luminosity class "IV", because it has a brighter luminosity than K-type main-sequence stars (luminosity class V). (Note: The term "subgiant" and its associated luminosity class "IV" can either refer to the life stage between the main-sequence and giant phases near the end of a star's life, or it can strictly refer to a star's luminosity only. In the case of V1400 Centauri, the latter definition is used since it is appropriate for the star's young age.) The letter "e" indicates V1400 Centauri exhibits weak hydrogen-alpha emission lines in its visible light spectrum. Lastly, "Li" indicates V1400 Centauri is abundant in lithium.

Measurements from the Gaia spacecraft's third and most recent data release (Gaia DR3) indicate V1400 Centauri is about 7% larger than the Sun in radius (1.07 R_{☉}; 740,000 km; 460,000 mi), but is slightly less massive than the Sun. Depending on whether magnetic effects are taken into account in V1400 Centauri's stellar evolution or not, the star's mass could be either 0.98 M_{☉} or 0.89 M_{☉}, respectively. Young stars tend to be magnetically active, and neglecting their magnetic effects results in an underestimation of their mass. An older estimate of V1400 Centauri's mass from Gaia's second data release (Gaia DR2) in 2018 gives 0.95 M_{☉}, but does not take magnetic effects into account.

V1400 Centauri is cooler and less luminous than the Sun, with an effective temperature of about 4,300 K (4,030 °C; 7,280 °F) and a luminosity about 34% that of the Sun. V1400 Centauri has an estimated surface gravity of about 200 m/s^{2} (over 20 times the gravity of Earth), based on Gaia measurements of the star's brightness, distance, and color. (Note: The Gaia DR3 table gives log g = 4.302 as the base 10 logarithm of surface gravity in cgs units. Raising 10 to the power of log g gives the star's surface gravity g in cgs units of cm/s^{2}. Converting the result to the SI acceleration units of m/s^{2} gives g ≈ 200.4 m/s^{2} for V1400 Centauri's surface gravity.) Gaia measurements also indicate V1400 Centauri has a lower metallicity than the Sun. (Note: The Gaia DR3 table gives the [Fe/H] metallicity (iron abundance relative to the Sun) as a base 10 logarithmic quantity. V1400 Centauri has a negative [Fe/H] metallicity of –0.1903, which indicates a lower iron abundance than the Sun.) Viewed from Earth, V1400 Centauri appears marginally redder than a typical K5-type star due to light extinction by interstellar dust between Earth and the star. (Note: The latest estimate for V1400 Centauri's extinction reddening index is E(G_{BP}–G_{RP}) = 0.0414+0.0518 −0.0314 mag, from Gaia DR3 (2022). Mamajek et al. (2012) claimed V1400 Centauri is consistent with being slightly reddened, whereas van Werkhoven et al. (2014) claimed it is statistically consistent with being unreddened.) The star does not exhibit excess thermal emission in near- and mid-infrared wavelengths and lacks strong emission lines in its spectrum, which indicates it lacks a substantial accretion disk or protoplanetary disk.

=== Rotation and variability ===
Like most young stars, V1400 Centauri rotates rapidly with a rotation period of approximately 3.2 days. The rapid rotation of V1400 Centauri strengthens its magnetic field via the dynamo process, which leads to the formation of starspots on its surface. As V1400 Centauri rotates, its starspots come into and out of view, causing the star's brightness to periodically fluctuate by 5%, or about 0.1 magnitudes in amplitude. The star's rotation period varies by 0.02 days over a 5.4-year-long magnetic activity cycle, due to the long-term movement of starspots across the star's differentially rotating surface. V1400 Centauri is known to emit soft X-rays due to its corona being heated by its rotationally-strengthened magnetic field. Because of its young age, starspot variability, and lack of dust accretion, V1400 Centauri is classified as a weak-lined T Tauri variable.

Spectroscopic measurements of Doppler broadening in V1400 Centauri's spectral absorption lines indicate the star has a projected rotational velocity of 14.6±0.4 km/s. Given V1400 Centauri's rotation period, radius, and temperature, the star's true equatorial rotation velocity is 15.7±1.7 km/s, which indicates that the star's rotation axis is inclined 68°±10° with respect to Earth's line of sight.

== 2007 dimming events ==
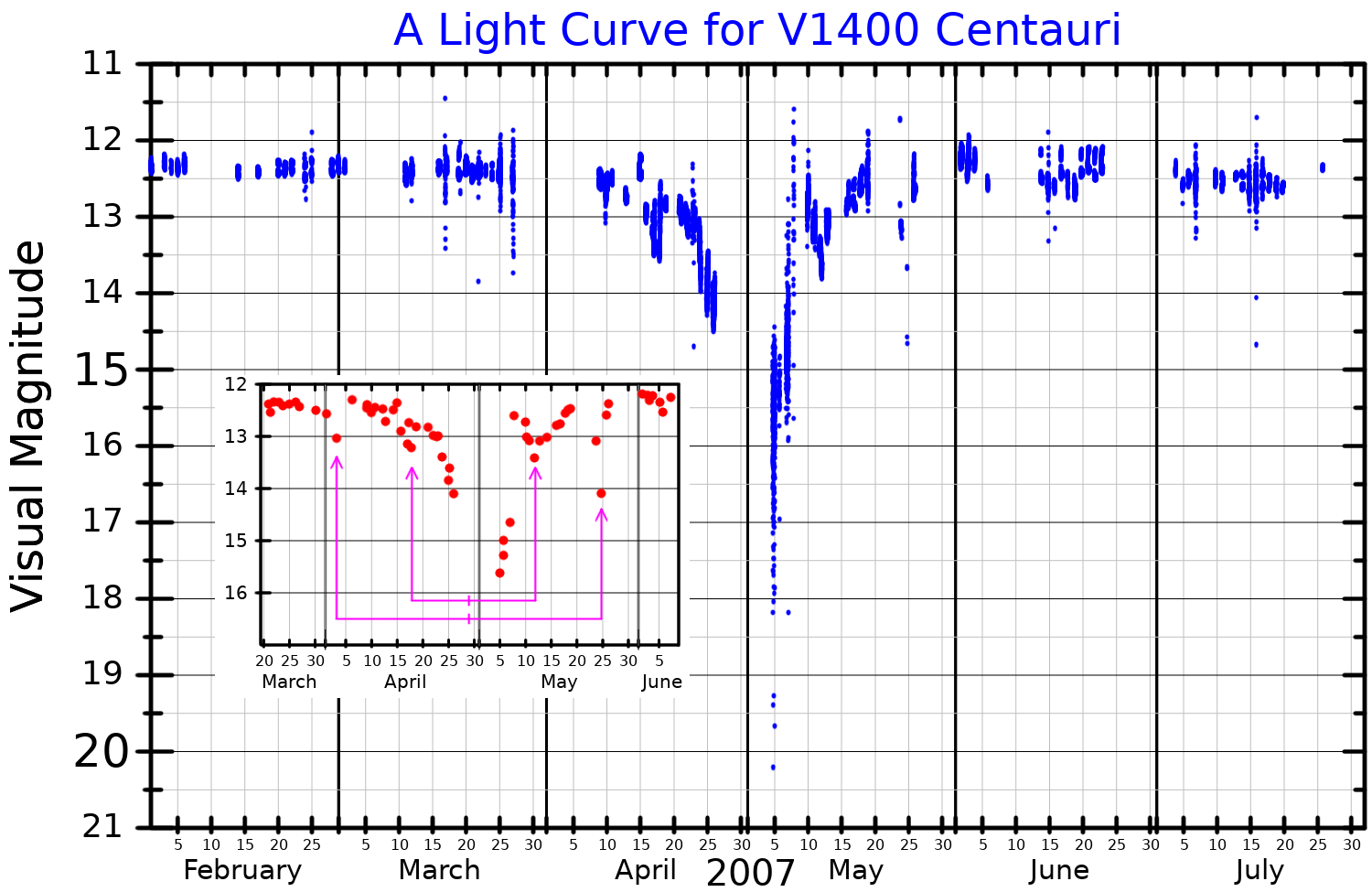
This light curve of V1400 Centauri's brightness during 2007 shows a 56-day-long series of dimming events. It has been hypothesized that these dimmings were caused by a large disked object (J1407b) eclipsing the star.

During 7 April to 4 June 2007, (Note: According to van Werkhoven et al. (2014), J1407b's eclipse start and end times are Modified Julian Date (MJD) 54197 and 54255, respectively. To convert these to Julian date (JD), add 2400000.5 to MJD. This gives JD 2454197.5 and JD 2454255.5 for the eclipse start and end times, respectively. Converting these JD dates to calendar dates gives 7 April 2007 UTC and 4 June 2007 UTC, respectively.) telescopes of the Super Wide Angle Search for Planets (SuperWASP) and All Sky Automated Survey (ASAS) projects recorded V1400 Centauri undergoing a series of significant dimming events for 56 days. The pattern of these dimming events was complex yet nearly symmetrical, suggesting they were caused by an opaque, disk-like structure eclipsing the star. The object thought to be responsible for these eclipses has been dubbed J1407b.

V1400 Centauri's 2007 dimmings were discovered on 3 December 2010 by Mark Pecaut, who was a graduate student of Eric E. Mamajek at the University of Rochester. Mamajek, Pecaut, and collaborators announced the discovery in 2012. Mamajek's team initially hypothesized that J1407b was a ringed exoplanet orbiting the star, but this explanation turned out to be unlikely because no new eclipses were ever observed, nor did historical photographic plates show any evidence for eclipses in the last century. Astronomers have alternatively proposed that J1407b might have been a free-floating substellar object with a circumstellar disk that coincidentally eclipsed V1400 Centauri, with follow-up observations suggesting that its disk is not thick and dusty.

== See also ==
- List of transiting circumsecondary disks
- List of stars that have unusual dimming periods
