= Eric Mamajek =

American astrophysicist

Eric E. Mamajek
- Born: October 22, 1975 (age 50); Pittsburgh, Pennsylvania, United States
- Occupations: Astrophysicist and academic

Academic background
- Education: Penn State University (B.S.); University of New South Wales/ADFA (M.Sc.); University of Arizona (M.S., Ph.D.)
- Thesis: Identification and Characterization of Young, Nearby, Solar-type Stars (2004)

Eric E. Mamajek (born 1975) is an American astrophysicist. He is a principal scientist at the Jet Propulsion Laboratory (JPL) and the deputy program chief scientist for the NASA Exoplanet Exploration Program.

Mamajek's research interests have focused on the formation and evolution of stars, planets, substellar objects, and circumstellar disks, with an emphasis on characterizing stars' ages and membership in kinematic groups and multiple systems.

== Early life and education ==
Mamajek was born in Pittsburgh, Pennsylvania, in 1975. He graduated from Bethel Park High School in 1993 and completed his bachelor of science from Penn State University in 1998. Later in 2000, he earned a master of science in physics from the University of New South Wales. He later studied at the University of Arizona, where he received his master of science and Ph.D. in astronomy in 2001 and 2004, respectively.

== Career ==
In 2008, Mamajek joined the University of Rochester as an assistant professor, became associate professor in 2013 and professor in 2016. In 2016, he was appointed as deputy program chief scientist for NASA's Exoplanet Exploration Program at the JPL and was promoted to JPL principal scientist in the Astrophysics and Space Sciences directorate.

Mamajek was the chair of the IAU Working Group on Star Names from 2016 to 2021.

== Research ==
Mamajek's research has addressed the formation, evolution, and characterization of stars, substellar objects, and exoplanetary systems, especially in the solar neighborhood. He has worked on determining stellar ages, distances, and kinematics of young stars and associations, as well as protoplanetary disks around stars. He has determined rotation periods, X-ray luminosities, and studied the association between magnetically generated stellar rotation and coronal activity.

Mamajek co-discovered the ringed substellar object J1407b, which has also been referred to as “Mamajek’s object”. Its extensive ring system was inferred from complex eclipses of its host star. The rings are much larger than those of Saturn, with gaps that may indicate ongoing satellite formation. His research has also included stellar age-dating techniques for young stars and open clusters, as well as the application of Bayesian inference methods to estimate membership probabilities for stellar groups within 150 parsecs of the Sun. Mamajek led research demonstrating that the binary system Scholz's Star passed through the outer Oort Cloud approximately 70,000 years ago, representing the closest known stellar flyby of the Solar System. In collaboration with Stapelfeldt, he has also identified nearby stars considered promising targets for future observations by NASA’s Habitable Worlds Observatory.

== Selected articles ==
- Mamajek, Eric E.; Hillenbrand, Lynne A. (2008). "Improved Age Estimation for Solar-Type Dwarfs Using Activity-Rotation Diagnostics". The Astrophysical Journal. 687 (2): 1264–1293. arXiv:0807.1686. Bibcode:2008ApJ...687.1264M. doi:10.1086/591785.
- Mamajek, Eric E.; Usuda, Tomonori; Tamura, Motohide; Ishii, Miki (2009). "Initial Conditions of Planet Formation: Lifetimes of Primordial Disks". AIP Conference Proceedings. 1158 (1): 3–10. arXiv:0906.5011. Bibcode:2009AIPC.1158....3M. doi:10.1063/1.3215910.
- Wright, Nicholas J.; Drake, Jeremy J.; Mamajek, Eric E.; Henry, Gregory W. (2011). "The Stellar-Activity-Rotation Relationship and The Evolution of Stellar Dynamos". The Astrophysical Journal. 743 (1): 48. arXiv:1109.4634. Bibcode:2011ApJ...743...48W. doi:10.1088/0004-637X/743/1/48.
- Pecaut, Mark J.; Mamajek, Eric E. (2013). "Intrinsic Colors, Temperatures, And Bolometric Corrections of Pre-Main-Sequence Stars". The Astrophysical Journal Supplement Series. 208 (1): 9. arXiv:1307.2657. Bibcode:2013ApJS..208....9P. doi:10.1088/0067-0049/208/1/9.
- Gagné, Jonathan; Mamajek, Eric E.; Malo, Lison; Riedel, Adric; Rodriguez, David; et al. (2018). "BANYAN. XI. The BANYAN Σ Multivariate Bayesian Algorithm to Identify Members of Young Associations with 150 pc". The Astrophysical Journal. 856 (1): 23. arXiv:1801.09051. Bibcode:2018ApJ...856...23G. doi:10.3847/1538-4357/aaae09.
- Mamajek, Eric; Stapelfeldt, Karl (2024). "NASA Exoplanet Exploration Program (ExEP) Mission Star List for the Habitable Worlds Observatory (2023)". arXiv:2402.12414 [astro-ph.IM].
