= KPNO-Tau 12 =

Young substellar object

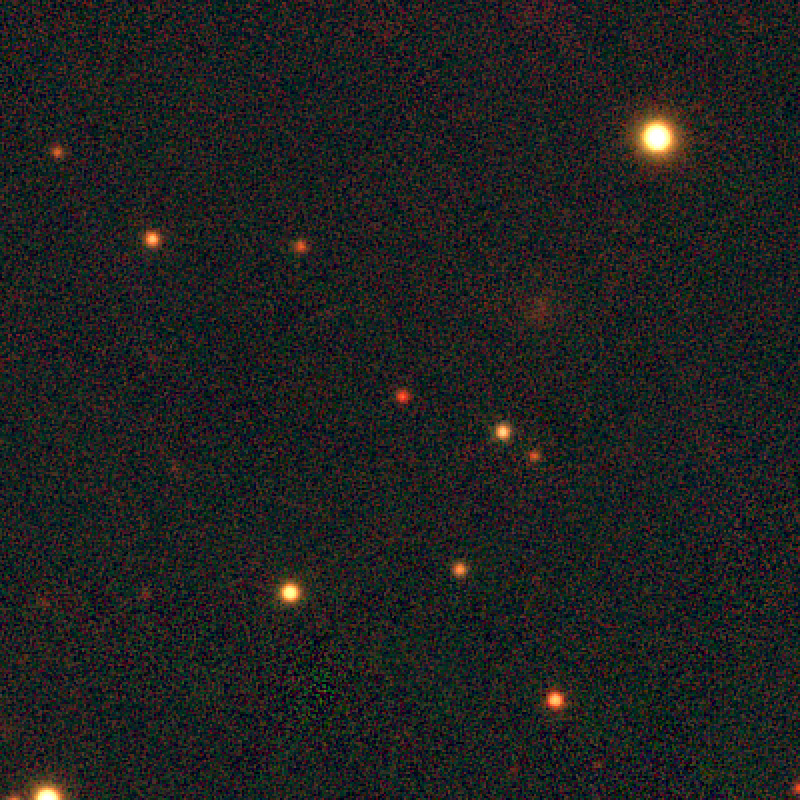
- KPNO-Tau 12 (red object in the center); Credit: PanSTARRS & Meli thev

Observation data Epoch J2000 Equinox J2000
- Constellation: Taurus
- Right ascension: 04^{h} 19^{m} 01.28^{s}
- Declination: +28° 02′ 48.1″
- Apparent magnitude (V): 23.228±0.023

Characteristics
- Evolutionary stage: low-mass brown dwarf or planetary-mass object
- Spectral type: M9.25±0.5

Astrometry
Proper motion (μ)	RA: 7.09±5.60 mas/yr Dec.: −28.41±5.27 mas/yr
Distance	473 ± 49 ly (145±15 pc)

Details
Mass	12.7+1.6 −1.8 M_{Jup}
Radius	2.22+0.11 −0.17 R_{Jup}
Luminosity (bolometric)	10^{−2.99±0.16} L_{☉}
Temperature	2170±200 K
Rotational velocity (v sin i)	5.0 km/s
Age	1-10 Myr

Other designations
- KPNO-Tau 12, 2MASS J04190126+2802487, SSTtau 041901.2+280248, TIC 58285609, UGCS J041901.27+280248.3, WISE J041901.26+280248.2, Gaia DR2 164487734085116800

Database references
SIMBAD	data

KPNO-Tau 12 (also called 2MASS J0419012+280248) is a low-mass brown dwarf or free-floating planetary-mass object that is surrounded by a protoplanetary disk, actively accreting material from it.

== Discovery ==
KPNO-Tau 12 was identified in 2003 in data from a survey of the Taurus Molecular Clouds taken with a telescope at the Kitt Peak National Observatory (KPNO) and 2MASS. The object was observed with the MMT Observatory/Blue Channel spectrometer and with Keck/LRIS. KPNO-Tau 12 showed a spectral type of M9 and also showed strong Hydrogen-alpha emission. At the time its mass was estimated to be around 0.02 M_{☉} (or 21 M_{J}), which would make it a brown dwarf. Since then several works found that it likely has a mass near or below the deuterium-burning limit, which makes this object a low-mass brown dwarf or planetary-mass object (e.g. 14.6 M_{J}, 13.6 M_{J}, 6-7 M_{J}, 16.5 M_{J}, 17.8+6.7
−4.6 M_{J}, 12.7+1.6
−1.8 M_{J}).

A few other free-floating planetary-mass objects are known in the Taurus Clouds. These include three other objects with possible disks around them.

== Atmosphere ==
Observations with Keck/LRIS showed several absorption features. These are titanium oxide, calcium hydride, vanadium oxide, sodium and potassium. A spectrum with Keck/NIRSPEC was interpreted to be consistent with very low gravity. This is typical for young sources. Several re-classifications of the spectral type were made over the years. In 2013 it was re-classified as a M9.25±0.5. In 2018 it was re-classified as a L0.7±1.1, which could make this object an early L-dwarf. A spectrum observed with VLT/SINFONI was published in 2022, estimating a spectral type of M9.8.

== Protoplanetary disk ==
KPNO-Tau 12 showed strongest H-alpha emission in both the MMT and Keck optical spectra. It also showed helium (He I) and calcium (Ca II IR triplet) emission in the Keck spectrum, which are usually seen in stars that undergo intense accretion of material from a surrounding protoplanetary disk. Additionally a Keck infrared spectrum shows a prominent emission line (see figure 10 of their work), which is described as Paschen β at 1.28 μm in the appendix of the paper. Paschen lines can be used as additional accretion indicators. In 2010 two works used observations with the Spitzer Space Telescope. These two works first identified infrared excess around KPNO-Tau 12 and classified it as a class II disk. A class II disk is composed of both a gaseous and a dusty part and belongs to the protoplanetary disks. Observation with the Spitzer Infrared Spectrograph showed that the silicate emission feature is likely missing. The dust mass of the disk was estimated to be 1.223 M_{🜨} or 0.6–1.1 M_{🜨}, depending on the work. The total (gas+dust) mass was estimated to be 0.66 M_{J} or 0.095 M_{J}, depending on the work. The dust temperature was estimated to be 7.0±13.8 Kelvin and the dust grains are smaller than 27.5 millimeters.

KPNO-Tau-12's protoplanetary disk
Disks (in order from star/planet)	Periapsis (AU)	Apoapsis (AU)	Inclination	Mass
protoplanetary disk	0.003	6.4–95.5	25.50°–26.30°	30–210 M_{🜨}

== See also ==
- 2MASS J04442713+2512164 is another brown dwarf with a disk in Taurus

Other free-floating planetary-mass objects with disks:

- 2MASS J11151597+1937266, closest free-floating planetary-mass object surrounded by a disk
- Cha 110913−773444
- OTS 44, has a well-studied disk
- J1407b, could also orbit a star

Other planetary-mass objects with disks that bound to a star:

- SR 12c
- Delorme 1 (AB)b
- 2M1207b
- PDS 70c, first circumplanetary disk
