= Cha 110913−773444 =

Brown dwarf in the constellation Chamaleon

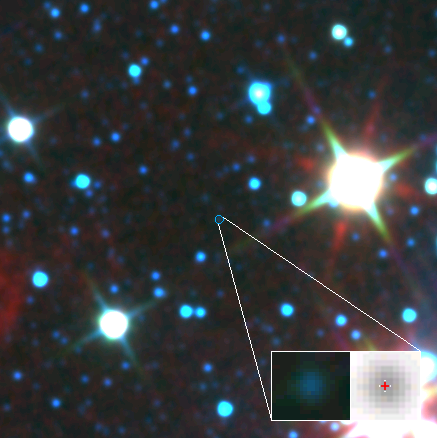
- WISE image centered on the brown dwarf Cha 110913−773444

Observation data Epoch J2000.0 Equinox ICRS
- Constellation: Chamaeleon
- Right ascension: 11^{h} 09^{m} 13.63^{s}
- Declination: −77° 34′ 44.6″

Astrometry
| Distance | 529 (Note: From a distance modulus (μ) of 6.05) ly (162 pc) |

Details
| Mass | 8+7 −3 M_{Jup} |
| Radius | 2.0 or 2.1 R_{Jup} |
| Luminosity (bolometric) | 0.000603 (Note: From the logarithm (log L_{bol}) of −3.22) L_{☉} |
| Temperature | 1300–1400 K |
| Age | 0.5–10 Myr |

Database references
| SIMBAD | data |

Cha 110913−773444 (sometimes abbreviated Cha 110913) is an astronomical object surrounded by what appears to be a protoplanetary disk. It lies at a distance of 529 light-years from Earth. There is no consensus yet among astronomers whether to classify the object as a sub-brown dwarf (with planets) or a rogue planet (with moons).

Cha 110913−773444 was discovered in 2004 by Kevin Luhman and others at Pennsylvania State University using the Spitzer Space Telescope and the Hubble Space Telescope, as well as two Earth-bound telescopes in Chile.

== Gallery ==
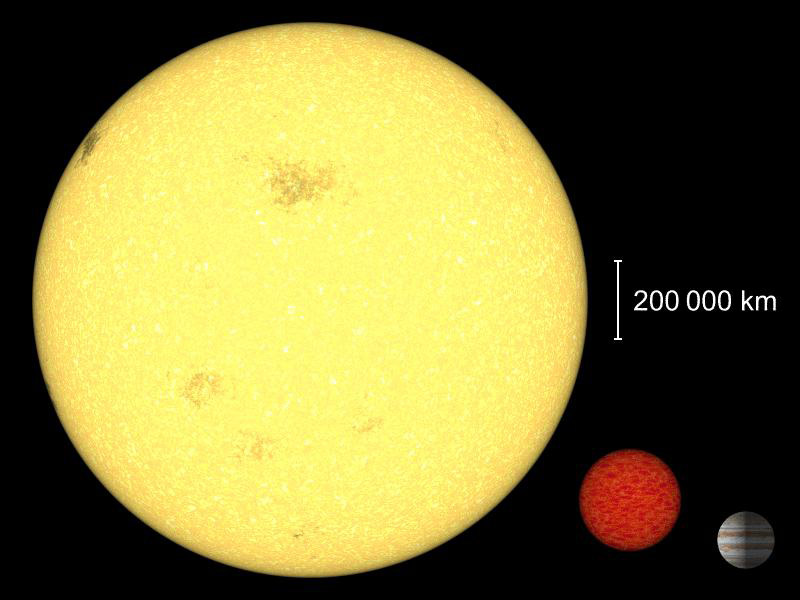
Comparison between the Sun (yellow), Cha 110913-773444 (red) and Jupiter

== See also ==
- WISEA J120037.79-784508.3, a brown dwarf with a primordial disk
- OTS 44, a rogue planet
- PSO J318.5−22, a rogue planet
- 2MASS J11151597+1937266, a relative nearby planetary-mass object with a disk
- KPNO-Tau 12, a low-mass brown dwarf or planetary-mass object with a disk
