= SR 12 (star) =

T-Tauri star

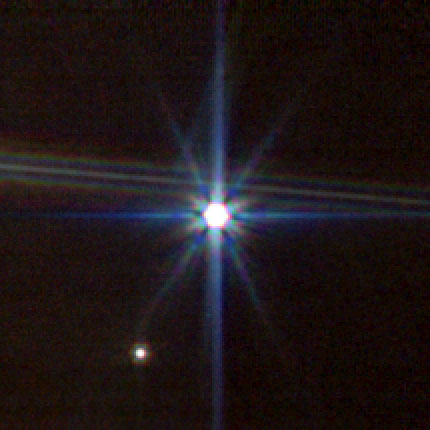
- SR 12 and SR 12c (lower left) with JWST MIRI

Observation data Epoch J2000 Equinox J2000
- Constellation: Ophiuchus
- Right ascension: 16^{h} 27^{m} 19.51^{s}
- Declination: −24° 41′ 40.4″
- Apparent magnitude (V): 13.09 to 13.53

Characteristics
- Evolutionary stage: T Tauri star
- Spectral type: M3 + M8
- Variable type: rotational variable

Astrometry
Radial velocity (R_{v})	−5.65±0.01 km/s
Proper motion (μ)	RA: −7.703±1.088 mas/yr Dec.: −25.327±0.829 mas/yr
Parallax (π)	8.9034±0.4288 mas
Distance	370 ± 20 ly (112 ± 5 pc)

Position (relative to SR 12A)
Component	SR 12B
Epoch of observation	2022.2827
Angular distance	0.1118±0.0011″
Position angle	76.2±1.1°

Details

SR 12A
Mass	0.36+0.16 −0.07 M_{☉}
Radius	2.0±0.3 R_{☉}
Temperature	3428 K
Rotation	3.4 to 3.6 days
Age	2 Myr

SR 12B
Temperature	2500 K

Other designations
- EM* SR 12, 2MASS J16271951-2441403, ISO-Oph 130, ROX 21, TIC 175629526, V2247 Oph, WDS J16273-2442AB

Database references
SIMBAD	data
Exoplanet Archive	data

SR 12 (also known as V2247 Oph) is a weak-line T-Tauri binary that has a planetary-mass companion with a detected accretion disk.

== The binary ==
SR 12 was discovered by Otto Struve and Mogens Rudkjøbing in 1949 as an emission-line star with a spectral type of M. The first letters of their names were used to name the star, together with the star number in their catalog. It was also observed as an x-ray source with the Einstein Observatory, having the designation ROX 21. The binary was discovered with the help of lunar occultations and speckle interferometry in 1987.

The binary is located in the ρ Ophiuchi star-forming region and is a weak-line T-Tauri binary, meaning it still accretes gaseous material from a circumstellar disk. There are differences in spectral type classifications of the individual stars. A K4/M2.5 binary was suggested, as well as a M3+M8 binary. The binary is separated by about 0.21 arcseconds, which corresponds to a separation of 24 AU. Speckle interferometry from SOAR does however find a lower separation of 0.1118 ±1.1 arcseconds.

The star is a variable with a rotation period that changes between 3.4 and 3.6 days. This is due to stellar spots at different latitudes corresponding to different rotation periods, which indicates photospheric shearing. The magnetic surface of the primary was mapped in 2010. The magnetic field showed changes within 1 week. Excess emissions concentrated at mid-latitude are seen as a footprint of an accretion funnel. The binary does not have any detection of circumbinary dust from Spitzer and ALMA observations.

== Substellar companion ==
SR 12c was first detected in 2002 using the Infrared Survey Facility (IRSF), which was constructed and operated by Nagoya University and NAOJ and is located at the South African Astronomical Observatory. Follow-up observations were carried out with the Subaru Telescope in 2005 and 2008. Archival Hubble Space Telescope and Very Large Telescope (VLT) data were used to confirm the astrometry. The companion is also mentioned in a paper from 2002 that detects it in Hubble/NICMOS.

SR 12c has a separation of about 980 AU from the binary. The near-infrared spectrum suggested a spectral type of M9.0 ± 0.5 of the planetary-mass companion (PMC) and a mass of 14+7
−8 M_{J}. An additional higher-resolution near-infrared spectrum was taken in 2014, which showed signs of very low surface gravity, which is an indicator of youth. VLT spectroscopy resulted in a spectral type of L0 ± 1. A later work found that SR 12c is less massive with 11 ±3 M_{J} and SED-fitting yielded a spectral type of L0 ±1. Several observations indicated that SR 12c is surrounded by a disk.

Observations with the VLT X-SHOOTER showed hydrogen emission lines, especially Hydrogen-alpha. This indicated that SR 12c accretes material at a rate of 10^{−11.08±0.40} M_{☉}/year. After five years observations with Hubble showed that the Hα line decreased by 90% in strength. Additionally the researchers detected the planet in ultraviolet. A blueward excess is accretion related and researchers find clear signs for the Balmer jump. The object also showed infrared excess from Spitzer IRAC photometry. Observations with ALMA did detect the disk, but was not able to resolve the disk, indicating a dust disk radius less than 5 AU and the radius might be about 0.3 AU if the continuum is optically thick. The disk has a dust mass twice as high as the disk around PDS 70c, but is less massive than OTS 44. Assuming the disk has only 1 mm grains, the dust mass of the disk is 0.012 M_{🜨} (0.95 M_{☾}). For a disk only made of 1 μm grains, it would have a dust mass of 0.054 M_{🜨} (4.4 M_{☾}). The disk also contains gas, as is indicated by the accretion of hydrogen, with the gas mass being on the order of 0.03 M_{J} (about 9.5 M_{🜨}). ALMA did not detect any carbon monoxide in the disk.

The SR 12 planetary system
Companion (in order from star)	Mass	Semimajor axis (AU)	Orbital period (years)	Eccentricity	Inclination (°)	Radius
c	16±2 M_{J}	980	—	—	—	1.9±0.3 R_{J}

== Gallery ==
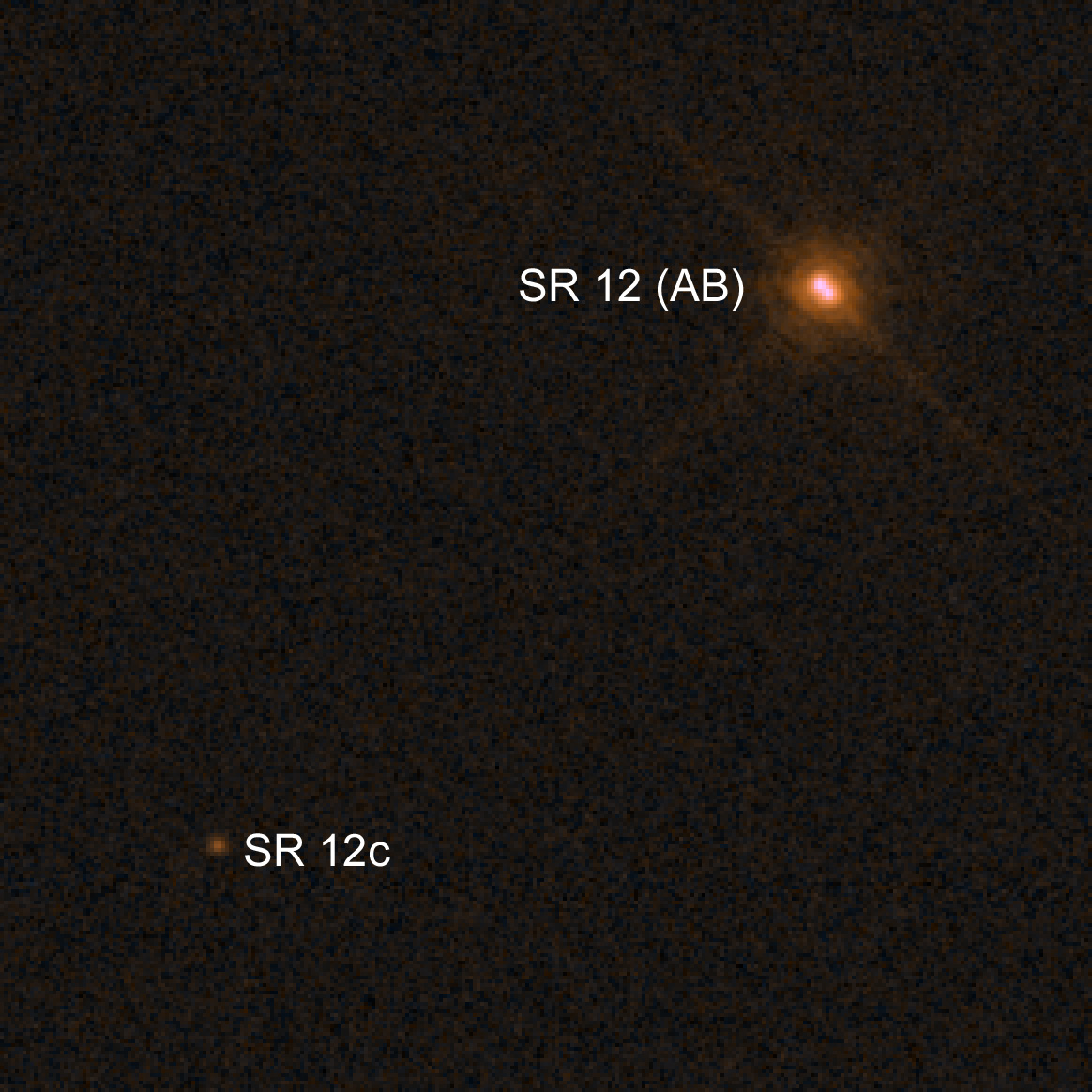
Hubble image of SR 12 binary (upper right) and SR 12c (lower left). The orange part of the image shows H-alpha.

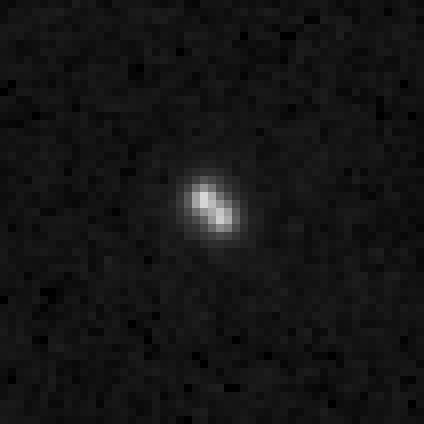
The binary SR 12 with Hubble

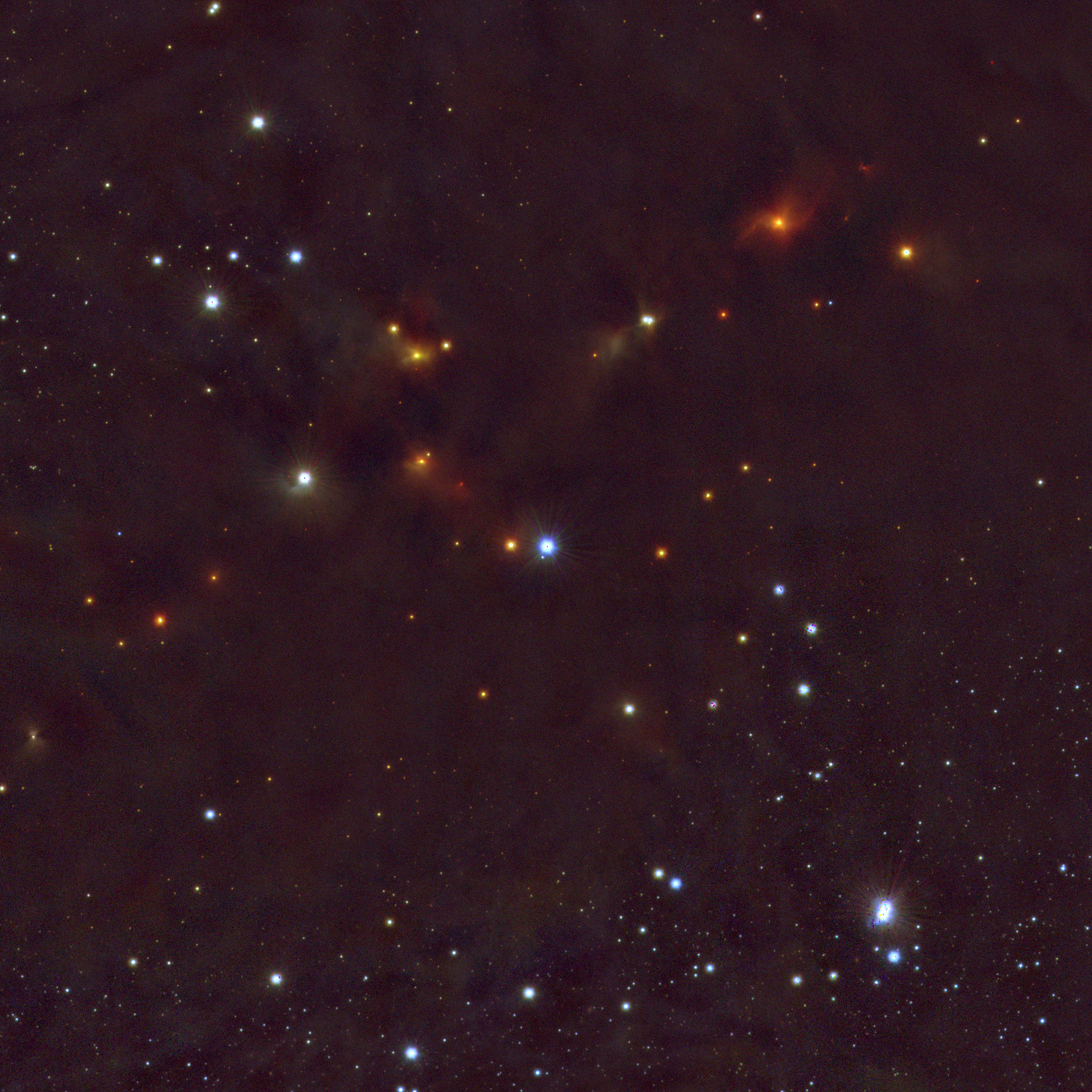
Wide view around SR 12 with VISTA, showing many young stars in the Ophiuchus dark clouds. SR 12 is the blue star at the center and SR 12c is the faint blue "star" below SR 12.
