= Delorme 1 =

Binary star system in the Phoenix constellation

Delorme 1 (AB)
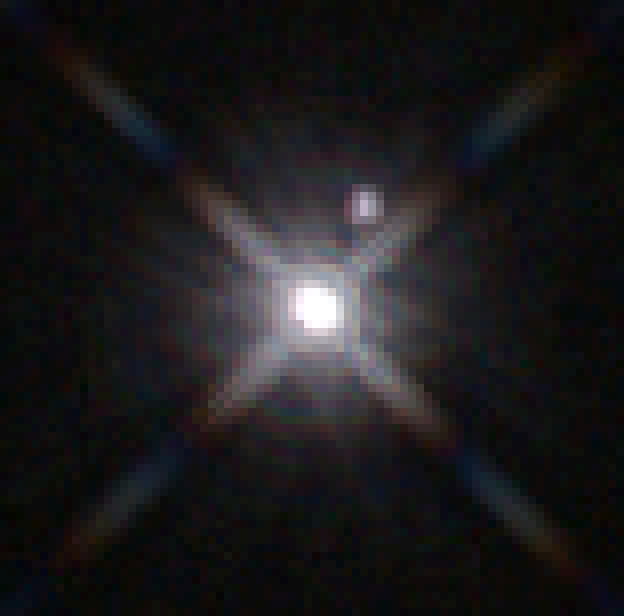
- The binary Delorme 1 (AB) is in the center and the companion is the source on the upper right. Credit: NASA/ESA Hubble WFC3; Daniel Apai et al. & Melina Thévenot

Observation data Epoch J2000 Equinox J2000
- Constellation: Phoenix
- Right ascension: 01^{h} 03^{m} 35.6551^{s}
- Declination: −55° 15′ 56.243″
- Apparent magnitude (V): 15.40 ±0.05

Characteristics
- Evolutionary stage: red dwarf
- Spectral type: M5/6+M5/6+L0(VLG)
- Variable type: flare star

Astrometry
Radial velocity (R_{v})	5.2 ±1.6 km/s
Proper motion (μ)	RA: 111.6 ±3.6 mas/yr Dec.: -43.8 ±8.1 mas/yr
Parallax (π)	21.18±1.37 mas
Distance	154 ± 10 ly (47 ± 3 pc)

Details

Delorme 1A
Mass	0.19 ±0.02 M_{☉}

Delorme 1B
Mass	0.17 ±0.02 M_{☉}

Position (relative to Delorme 1A)
Component	Delorme 1B
Epoch of observation	2012
Angular distance	0.249 ±0.003″
Projected separation	12 AU

Other designations
- SCR J0103-5515, ** DLR 1AB, DENIS J010335.6-551556, WDS J01036-5516AB, WISE J010335.75-551556.6, 2MASS J01033563-5515561

Database references
SIMBAD	data
Exoplanet Archive	data

Delorme 1 (2MASS J01033563-5515561) is a binary star with a planetary-mass companion (PMC) or protoplanet in a circumbinary orbit. The PMC is notable for showing signs of accretion, despite being 30-45 Myr old, making it similar to Peter Pan disks. These disks show characteristics of a gas-rich disk at unexpected high ages.

== Binary system ==
The star was resolved in 2013 with the Very Large Telescope NACO instrument by Delorme et al. A spectrum of the binary was taken with GMOS at Gemini South, which showed a spectral type of M5.5/M6 and strong Hydrogen-alpha emission. The astrometry showed that this star belongs to the Tucana-Horologium association. The binary is separated by around 12 astronomical units (AU). In 2014 Riedel et al. found a better match with the Carina association, which has a similar age as Tuc-Hor. They also found the system to be over-luminous, which might either hint at a younger age or further multiplicity. Other searches do, however, find a better match with Tuc-Hor. Because the Washington Double Star Catalog named the binary ** DLR 1 after the first author of the discovery paper in 2013, Eriksson et al. suggested the name Delorme 1 for the binary. The binary is named after Philippe Delorme.

== Circumbinary companion ==
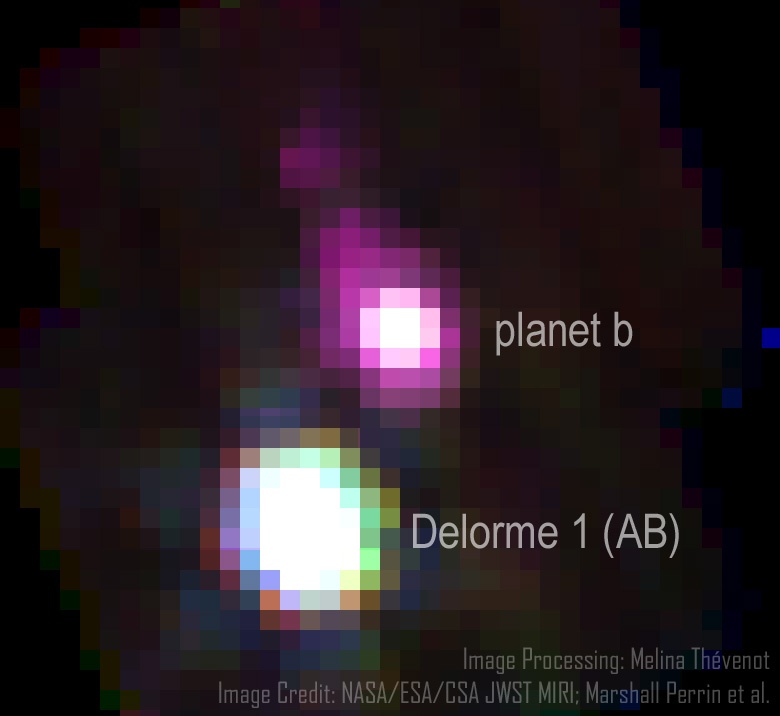
JWST MIRI IFU image, showing the molecular hydrogen outflow of the planet at 9.665 μm in violet

The binary companion was discovered in 2013 as an object with a mass between 12 and 14 M_{J} and a separation of 84 AU from the central binary. It had a spectrum similar to early L-dwarfs, but redder than field L-dwarfs. In 2020 Eriksson et al. discovered Hydrogen-alpha, -beta and Helium I lines from Delorme 1 (AB)b using MUSE. This is seen as a clear sign of accretion on a planetary-mass object. The spectral type of this object was determined to be L0 with very low gravity due to stronger than expected vanadium oxide absorption. H-alpha can be influenced by chromospheric activity, complicating its interpretation. Betti et al. discovered Paschen and Brackett lines in Delorme 1 (AB)b in the near-infrared, using TripleSpec at SOAR. These observations are in agreement with planetary-shock accretion. In 2023 Ringqvist et al. observed Delorme 1 (AB)b with the VLT UVES, detecting neutral hydrogen in the ultraviolet. Both near-infrared and ultraviolet observations show an accretion rate of about $(2-4)\times10^{-8} M_J yr^{-1}$ (about 1.2 to 2.3 the mass of 10 Hygiea per year). The planet and the star were observed with MIRI/IFU, which revealed the circumplanetary disk around the planet. The disk is carbon-rich and contains hydrogen cyanide (HCN), acetylene (C_{2}H_{2}, tentative: ^{13}CCH_{2}) and molecular hydrogen (H_{2}). The disk has a temperature of 295 ± 27 K (21.9 ± 27.0 °C; 71.3 ± 48.6 °F) and a inner cavity with a size of 32.6±3.1 R_{J}. According to simulations the disk will only fill out 40% of the Hill radius, resulting of a theoretical disk size of 7.8 AU. The extended emission by H_{2} is larger than this disk size, showing that it includes an outflow, maybe a disk wind coming from the circumplanetary disk. Assuming a disk wind is present, the disk has a mass-loss rate of 2 × 10^{−10} M_{J}/year.

Delorme 1 (AB)b has been called a protoplanet candidate and a super-Jupiter. The researchers found that the high accretion is in better agreement with a formation via disk fragmentation, hinting that it might have formed from a circumstellar disk. Giant planets and brown dwarfs are thought to form via disk fragmentation in rare cases in the outer regions of a disk (r>50 AU). Teasdale et al. modelled three formation scenarios in which the planet could have formed. In the first two scenarios the planet forms in a massive disk via gravitational instability. The first two scenarios produce planets that have accretion and separation comparable to the observed ones, but the resulting planets are more massive than Delorme 1 (AB)b. In a third scenario the planet forms via core accretion in a less massive disk much closer to the binary. In this third scenario the mass and accretion are similar to the observed ones, but the separation is smaller. The modelling of JWST spectrum showed super-solar metallicity and C/O ratio for the planet, but the authors mention that these values are model dependent. The C/O ratio could be consistent with the formation between water and CO snowlines. Alternatively the carbon-rich circumplanetary disk could enrich the planet in carbon, explaining the elevated C/O ratio.

The Delorme 1 (AB) planetary system
Companion (in order from star)	Mass	Semimajor axis (AU)	Orbital period (years)	Eccentricity	Inclination (°)	Radius
b	12 to 14 M_{J}	102+47 −27	1682+1308 −628	0.32+0.27 −0.23	127+17 −8	1.9±0.1 R_{J}
