= Substellar object =

Astronomical object without the mass to sustain hydrogen fusion

A substellar object, sometimes called a substar, is an astronomical object, the mass of which is smaller than the smallest mass at which hydrogen fusion can be sustained (approximately 0.08 solar masses). This definition includes brown dwarfs, sub-brown dwarfs, and former stars similar to EF Eridani B, and can also include objects of planetary mass, regardless of their formation mechanism and whether or not they are associated with a primary star.

== Properties ==
Assuming that a substellar object has a composition similar to the Sun's and at least the mass of Jupiter (approximately 0.001 solar masses), its radius will be comparable to that of Jupiter (approximately 0.1 solar radii) regardless of the mass of the substellar object (brown dwarfs are less than 75 Jupiter masses). This is because the center of such a substellar object at the top range of the mass (just below the hydrogen-burning limit) is quite degenerate, with a density of ≈10^{3} g/cm^{3}, but this degeneracy lessens with decreasing mass until, at the mass of Jupiter, a substellar object has a central density less than 10 g/cm^{3}. The density decrease balances the mass decrease, keeping the radius approximately constant.

Substellar objects like brown dwarfs do not have enough mass to fuse hydrogen and helium, hence do not undergo the usual stellar evolution that limits the lifetime of stars.

A substellar object with a mass just below the hydrogen-fusing limit may ignite hydrogen fusion temporarily at its center. Although this will provide some energy, it will not be enough to overcome the object's ongoing gravitational contraction. Likewise, although an object with mass above approximately 0.013 solar masses will be able to fuse deuterium for a time, this source of energy will be exhausted in approximately 1–00 million years. Apart from these sources, the radiation of an isolated substellar object comes only from the release of its gravitational potential energy, which causes it to gradually cool and shrink. A substellar object in orbit around a star will shrink more slowly as it is kept warm by the star, evolving towards an equilibrium state where it emits as much energy as it receives from the star.

Substellar objects are cool enough to have water vapor in their atmosphere. Infrared spectroscopy can detect the distinctive color of water in gas giant size substellar objects, even if they are not in orbit around a star.

== Classification ==
William Duncan MacMillan proposed in 1918 the classification of substellar objects into three categories based on their density and phase state: solid, transitional and dark (non-stellar) gaseous. Solid objects include Earth, smaller terrestrial planets and moons; with Uranus and Neptune (as well as later mini-Neptune and Super Earth planets) as transitional objects between solid and gaseous. Saturn, Jupiter and large gas giant planets are in a fully "gaseous" state.

== Substellar companion ==
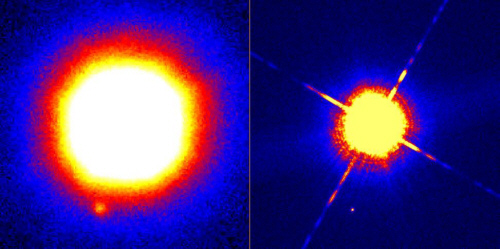
Earth and space bound observatories observe Gliese 229 and its companion, which is perhaps 20–40 Jupiter masses in size

A substellar object may be a companion of a star, such as an exoplanet or brown dwarf that is orbiting a star. Objects as low as 8–23 Jupiter masses have been called substellar companions.

Objects orbiting a star are often called planets below 13 Jupiter masses and brown dwarfs above that. Companions at that planet-brown dwarf borderline have been called Super-Jupiters, such as that around the star Kappa Andromedae. Nevertheless, objects as small as 8 Jupiter masses have been called brown dwarfs.

== See also ==
- Brown dwarf
- List of planet types
- Planet
- Red dwarf
- Sub-brown dwarf
