= Gaia20ehk =

F-type variable star

Gaia-GIC-1
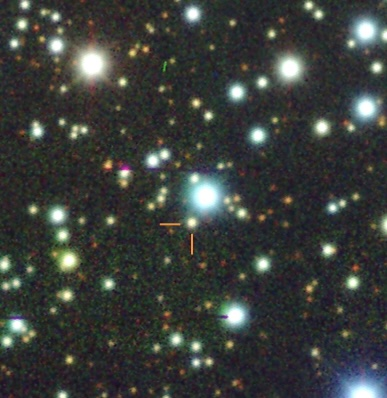
- Optical image of Gaia-GIC-1/Gaia20ehk taken by the Dark Energy Camera (DECam) on the 4.0m Blanco telescope at the Cerro Tololo Inter-American Observatory in Chile.

Observation data Epoch J2015 Equinox ICRS
- Constellation: Puppis
- Right ascension: 07^{h} 47^{m} 25.14^{s}
- Declination: −34° 09′ 32.4″

Characteristics
- Spectral type: F5
- J−K color index: 0.78

Astrometry
Proper motion (μ)	RA: −2.446 mas/yr Dec.: +2.946 mas/yr
Parallax (π)	0.3008±0.1550 mas
Distance	approx. 11,000 ly (approx. 3,000 pc)

Details
Mass	1.3 M_{☉}
Radius	1.7 R_{☉}
Surface gravity (log g)	4.1 cgs
Temperature	6,479 K
Metallicity [Fe/H]	−0.2 dex

Other designations
- AT 2020tdg, 2MASS 07472514-3409324, Gaia DR3 5593847908340254848

Gaia20ehk, also known as Gaia-GIC-1 (Giant Impact Candidate), is a young F-type variable star located 11,000 light-years (3,400 pc) from Earth in the constellation of Puppis. It is believed to be surrounded by hot circumstellar dust that formed from a planetary collision, causing irregular dimmings. Gaia-GIC-1 marks the first discovered planetary collision event found by the ESA's Gaia spacecraft and joins among a handful of other suspected planetary collision systems such as ASASSN-21qj, NGC 2547–ID8, HD 166191 and V488 Persei.

== Discovery ==
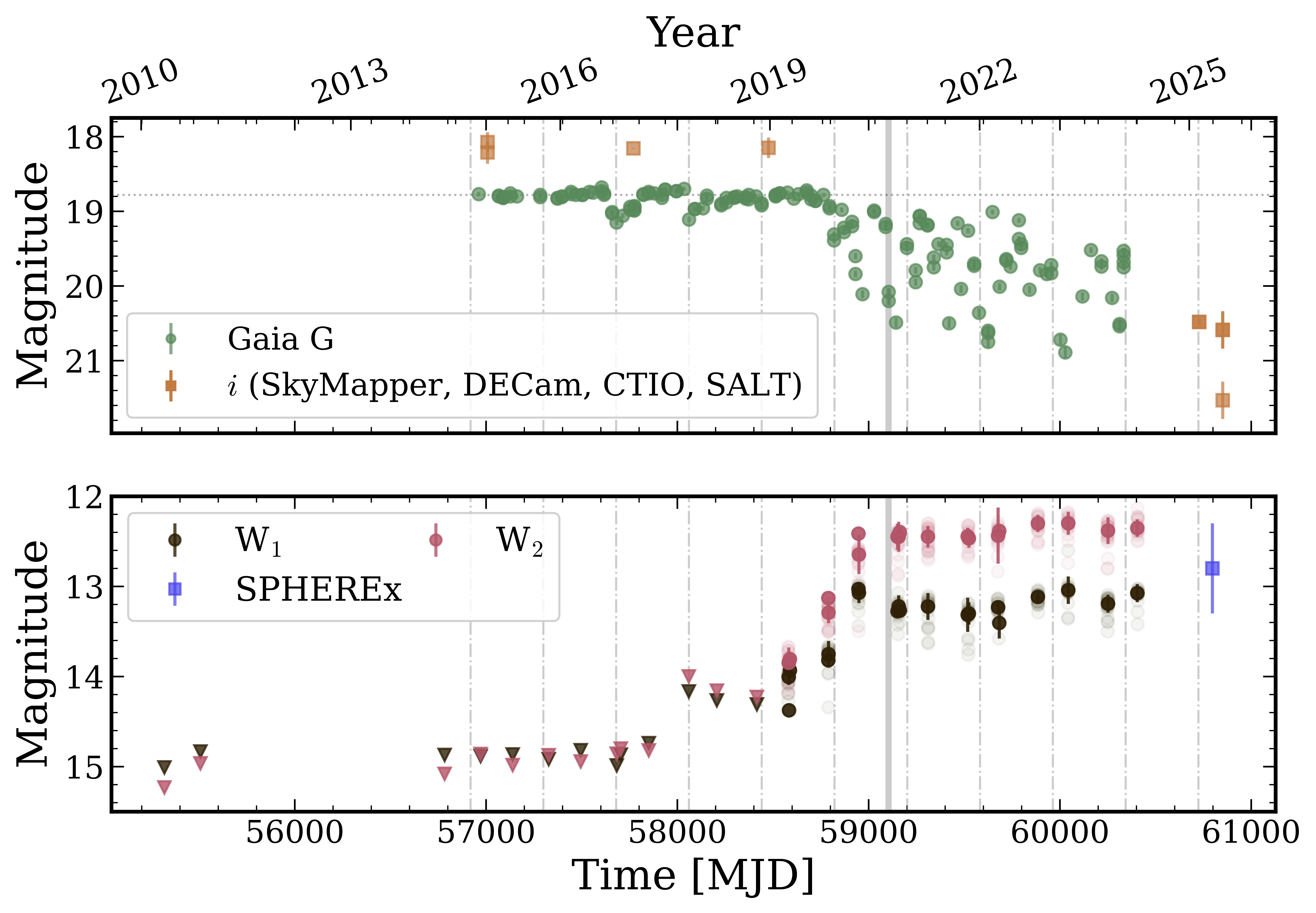
A light curve for Gaia-GIC-1/Gaia20ehk, showing the recovery from the dimming event. Original figure from Tzanidakis and Davenport 2026

Gaia-GIC-1 was initially discovered through the Gaia Photometric Science Alerts in 2026 by astronomers at the University of Washington, when astronomers noted the reported alert, Gaia20ehk, brightness exhibited unusual dips in the stars brightness upward of 25% reduction in flux. The Gaia Photometric Science Alerts released a public alert to the Transient Name Sever (TNS) named AT 2020tdg on September 12, 2020.

Gaia Photometric Science Alert Gaia-GIC-1/Gaia20ehk Gaia-G band light curve.

The optical wavelength light curve of Gaia-GIC-1 exhibits three distinct phases: (i) quiescent, (ii) periodic modulations, and (iii) irregular variability. Between October 31, 2014, to August 4, 2016, the star did not exhibit any large modulations in brightness. On August 16, 2016, the star suddenly exhibited a ~25% drop in brightness that lasted for 200 days with an asymmetric dimming transiting profile. These modulations repeated periodically with a 380.5 day orbital period, which translates to a semi-major axis 1.1 AU, assuming a 1.3 solar mass and readapted until approximately February 1, 2019. This is among the first of such giant impact candidate systems to exhibit evidence of clear periodic modulations before the onset of more complex variability.

WISE/NEOWISE W1+W2 image composite of Gaia-GIC-1. Observations span from 2016 to 2023.

Since November 11, 2019, the star undergone irregular drips in brightness with no periodic modulation on timescales of months with 50% drop in flux. Archival data from the SkyMapper and the Dark Energy Camera Plane Survey 2 (DECaPS2) including subsequent follow-up observations using the Southern African Large Telescope (SALT) and Cerro Tololo Inter-American Observatory (CITO) confirmed independent measurements that the star was indeed getting fainter since its initial measurement back in 2014 by Gaia. It is unclear if the star is still undergoing these irregular dips. More photometric monitoring is needed to confirm.

Archival time-series data from NASA's Wide-field Infrared Survey Explorer (WISE) exhibited a completely opposite trend. Around 2019, a new astronomical source appeared in the WISE data with a rapid increase in infrared light emerged and has plateaued since 2021. Observations in May 2025 from the Spectro-Photometer for the History of the Universe, Epoch of Reionization, and Ices Explorer (SPHEREx) near-infrared space observatory confirmed that the star is still bright in the infrared.

The reverse behavior between the optical and infrared light has been hypothesized to be caused by the newly generated debris clouds that is obscuring the host star, while the dusty material is glowing in the infrared light at 900 Kelvin and an area of 0.13 AU^{2} and a tentative dust mass estimate of ~10^{20} kilograms. The total dust amount amounts to approximately the dwarf planet Ceres. Gaia-GIC-1 is a suspected "afterglow" after the recent collision of two planets. Such inverse relationship between the optical and infrared light has been observed before in other giant impact systems. The researchers also investigated optical spectroscopic follow-up observations of Gaia-GIC-1 using the Southern African Large Telescope telescope. They have tentatively rule out that this star is not undergoing accretion-driven variability typical amongst Young stellar objects, though more follow-up observations are needed to say with more certainty.

== Age ==
The age of Gaia-GIC-1 is uncertain, though typically it is anticipated that stars with terrestrial planets undergo giant impact collisions within the first 100 million years. For example, the Moon is thought to have formed from the giant impact collision between the Early Earth and the Mars-sized protoplanet Theia, approximately 50–100 million years after the formation of the Solar System.

Marginal evidence from the Gaia spacecraft DR3 data based on the sky position, proper motions, and distance of Gaia-GIC-1 support a cluster membership between two open clusters: FSR 1347 and FSR 1352 which have ages between 6.3 and 15.9 million years old. If Gaia-GIC-1 is member of either cluster, then this would coincide with the anticipated stellar age when giant impacts would occur.

== See also ==
- List of stars that have unusual dimming periods
- List of extrasolar planetary collisions
- Tabby's Star
