= List of extrasolar planetary collisions =

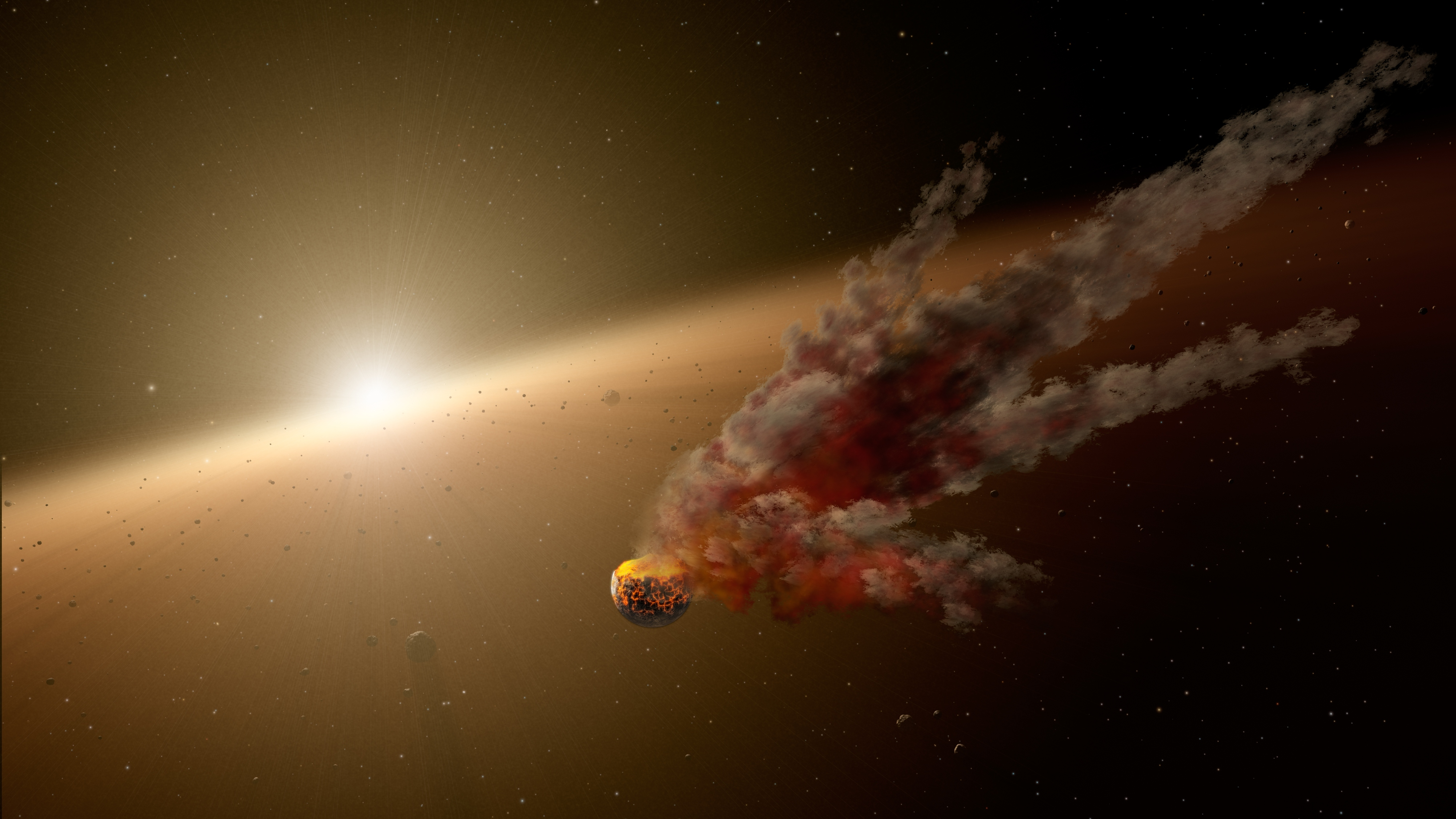
Artist's impression of a collision in NGC 2547–ID8

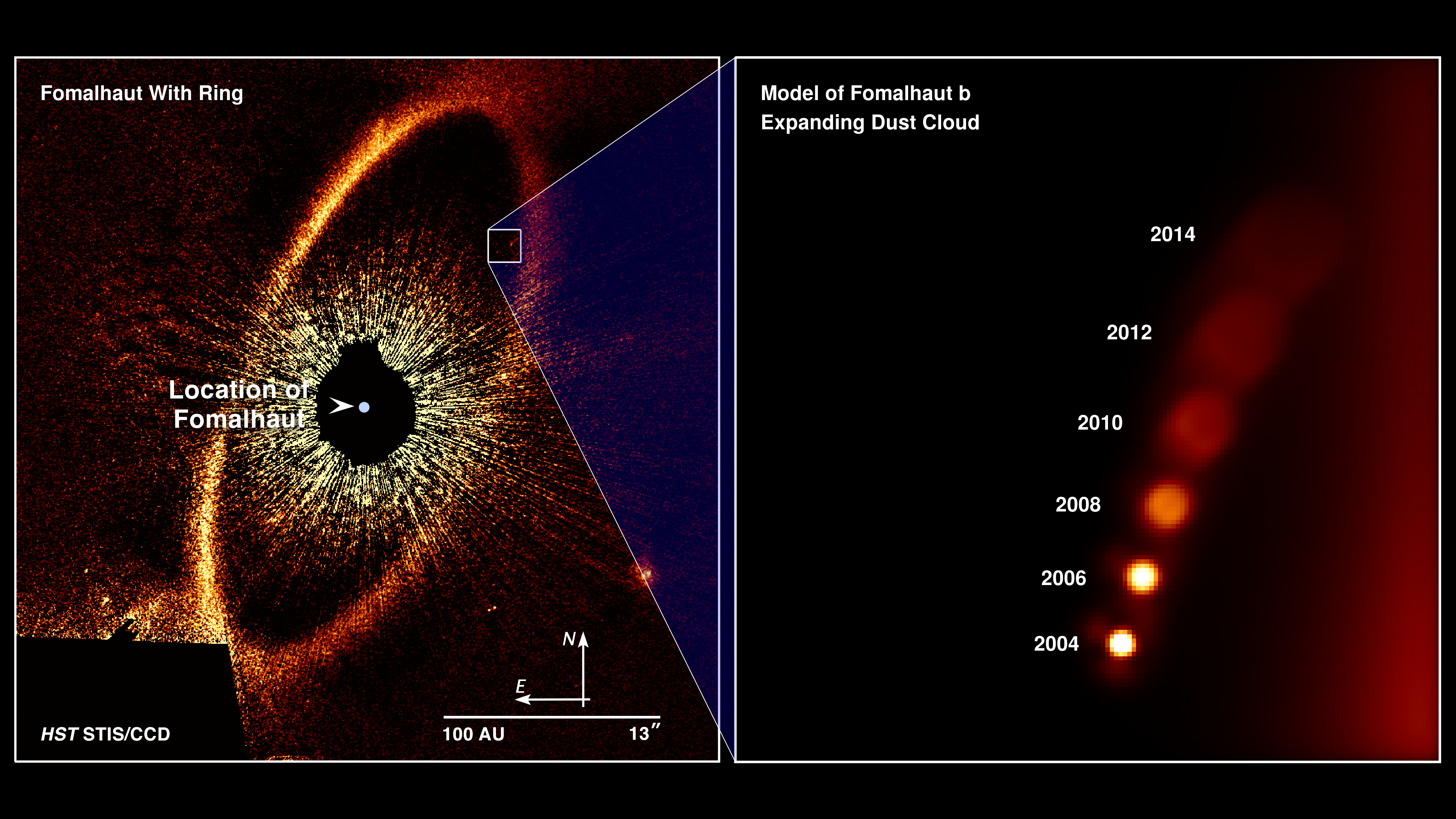
Fading and expansion of the Fomalhaut b dust cloud

This is a list of collisions between exoplanets or planetesimals observed in extrasolar systems. These collisions are more common in young systems and are an important part in the growth of especially terrestrial planets from so-called planetary embryos. Detections of individual collisions are nevertheless rare and are detected via transits in the optical, infrared excess, silicate emission or via infrared brightening. Collisions are thought to be common in a type of debris disk, so-called extreme debris disks (EDD). Co-moving stellar or substellar companions can trigger such collisions at an old age, creating old EDDs. Only about 24 EDDs are known.

This list does not include planetary bodies being accreted by white dwarfs; these are listed at List of exoplanets and planetary debris around white dwarfs.

== List of individual events ==
This list contains systems with individual collision events that were directly observed. Alternatively events were inferred from properties of the disk. The list is sorted by the start of each event.

| Name of star | spectral type | Approx. age (Myr) | Extreme debris disk? | Start of event | Colliding bodies | Notes | Ref. |
|---|---|---|---|---|---|---|---|
| Beta Pictoris | A6V | 20 | no | mid-19th century | 100–500 km body | So-called "cat's tail" feature in the disk observed in mid-infrared | |
| Beta Pictoris | A6V | 20 | no | A few years before 2004 | | Decreased mid-infrared flux and disappearance of forsterite emission | |
| Fomalhaut | A3V | 440 | no | Early 2004 | Two bodies of ≥110 km in size, or a 56 km body impacting a 893 km body | Fomalhaut b was once suspected to be a planet, but is now suspected to be the remains of a planetary collision | |
| Fomalhaut | A3V | 440 | no | September 2023 | two planetesimals | called "Fomalhaut cs2", is 135.3 AU distant from the star | |
| TYC 4209-1322-1 | G1V | 275 | yes | 2010 or earlier | unknown | | |
| TYC 4209-1322-1 | G1V | 275 | yes | Sometime in 2014 | Two ≥90 km bodies | brightening and fading between 2014 and 2018 | |
| P1121 | F9V | 80 | yes | Before 2012 | Two bodies with sizes of ≥100 km | One hypervelocity impact | |
| NGC 2547–ID8 | G6V | 35 | yes | late 2012 | Two bodies with sizes of ≥100 km | likely grazing or hit-and-run type event | |
| NGC 2547–ID8 | G6V | 35 | yes | early 2014 | 100 km bodies, maybe same objects as the first event | fragments dominated by boulders | |
| HD 169142 | A5V | 6 | no | 2013–2018 | Unknown | Variability interpreted as appearance and disappearance of a dust ring. Comparisons with EDDs were made. | |
| Gaia20ehk | F5 | >10 | no | August 2016 | two planetesimals | dust mass 4 × 10^{22} kg, orbit of 1.1 AU before infrared brightening | |
| HD 166191 | late F- to early G | 10 | yes | Early 2018 | Two ≥500 km bodies, or Mars-sized planetary embryos | Sudden increase of dust production in early 2018, reaching a high in 2019. Also transit of star-sized dust clouds, produced by the collisions. Silica-rich material. | |
| V488 Persei | K2-2.5 V | 80 | yes | 2019 | Two 60 km bodies, or Mars-sized planetary embryos | Constant collisions will last 1,000 to 10,000 years. Possibly formation of a Mercury-like planet. Silica-rich material. | |
| ASASSN-21qj | G2 | 300 | no? | December 2021 | Two ice giants | Breakup of exocomets was also proposed. | |
| HD 172555 | A5V | 23 | no | Within 0.1 Myr | Two planetesimals, or Mars-sized planetary embryos | Compared to the formation of the Moon. Silicate-rich material. | |
| BD+20 307 | F-type binary | ≥1000 | yes | Unknown | Planetary-scale | Catastrophic collision between planetary-scale bodies | |
| HD 15407A | F3V | 80 or 2100 | yes | Unknown | Mars-sized planetary embryos | One giant hypervelocity impact? Silica-rich material. | |
| HD 23514 | F6V | 100 | yes | Unknown | Planetary embryos; later work: atmospheric stripping or giant impact, involving volatiles. Involving a mass at least corresponding to 120-165 km-size asteroid. Later work: Mars-sized planetary embryos. | Member of the Pleiades. Silica-rich material. | |
| TYC 4479-3-1 | G6V | 5000 | yes | Unknown | ≥50 km planetesimal | Disruption of one body | |
| HD 113766A | F2V | 17 | yes | Unknown | Partially differentiated bodies | Recent impact of two asteroids or planetary bodies | |
| TYC 8830-410-1 | G9V | 600 | yes | Unknown | Rocky bodies | Giant impact | |
| TYC 8105–370–1 | G9V | 130 | yes | Unknown | Mars-sized planetary embryos. | Silica-rich material. | |
| BD-04 3234 (TYC 4946–1106–1) | F6V | >150 | yes | Unknown | Mars-sized planetary embryos. | Silica-rich material. | |

HD 181327 has an asymmetry in its disk that could be explained by a giant collision, but later research excluded this scenario. Bodies described as silica-rich in Su et al. 2026 originate from collisions between large planetary embryos (Mars-sized), silica-poor on the other hand are collisions between smaller bodies (Moon-sized) or involve less energetic impacts, such as low-velocity grazing impacts.

== List of other EDDs ==
These objects appear as EDDs in Moór et al. EDDs are listed here, because they are often associated with individual giant collisions. List is sorted after discovery year.

| Name of star | Spectral type | Approx. age (Myr) | Notes | Discovery year | Ref. |
|---|---|---|---|---|---|
| TYC 8241–2652–1 | K2 | 10 | rapid disappearance of the disk, unknown mechanism | 2012 | |
| RZ Piscium | K0IV | 30 | Intense continuous collisions, destroying a 90 km asteroid each year. | 2013 | |
| TIC 43488669 | | 100-400 | runaway star, without further estimates of the collisions | 2020 | |
| TYC 4515–485–1 | F5V | >150 | without further estimates of the collisions | 2021 | |
| TYC 5940–1510–1 | G5V | 120 | without further estimates of the collisions | 2021 | |
| TYC 9196-2916-1 | K4.5V | 85 | without further estimates of the collisions | 2022 | |
| 2MASS J06091701-1508085 | G9V | 200 | without further estimates of the collisions | 2024 | |
| 2MASS J07120655-4752423 | K3.5V | 240 | without further estimates of the collisions | 2024 | |
| CD-44 6765 | K0.5V | 5500 | without further estimates of the collisions | 2024 | |
| 2MASS J20431522+1043355 | K4V | 250 | without further estimates of the collisions | 2024 | |

== List of EDD without collisions ==
| Name of star | spectral type | approximate age (Myr) | notes | discovery year | Reference |
|---|---|---|---|---|---|
| HD 145263 | F4V | 11 | hypervelocity impact was excluded in one study, instead extreme space weathering was suggested to explain observed mineralogy. This object appears as an EDD in Moór et al. Silica-rich material. Mars-sized planetary embryos. | 1998 | |

== See also ==
- List of stars that have unusual dimming periods
- List of largest craters in the Solar System
- Giant impact hypothesis
- Mercury is thought to have lost its mantle from a collision
- 354P/LINEAR small asteroid that was impacted by another asteroid
