= ASASSN-21qj =

Main sequence star

Observation data Epoch J2000.0 Equinox ICRS
- Constellation: Puppis
- Right ascension: 08^{h} 15^{m} 23.300^{s}
- Declination: −38° 59′ 23.30″
- Apparent magnitude (V): 13.48±0.034

Astrometry
Radial velocity (R_{v})	25.8±3 km/s
Proper motion (μ)	RA: −9.692 mas/yr Dec.: 7.349 mas/yr
Parallax (π)	1.7631±0.0112 mas
Distance	1,850 ± 10 ly (567 ± 4 pc)

Details
Mass	0.94 ± 0.07 M_{☉}
Radius	1.045 R_{☉}
Surface gravity (log g)	4.339±0.005 cgs
Temperature	5,760±10 K
Metallicity [Fe/H]	−0.23±0.01 dex
Rotation	4.43 ± 0.33 days
Age	300±92 Myr

Other designations
- ASASSN -21qj, 2MASS J08152329-3859234, Gaia DR3 5539970601632026752 USNOA2 0450-06370789

Database references
SIMBAD	data

ASASSN-21qj, also known as 2MASS J08152329-3859234, is a Sun-like main sequence star with a rotating disk of circumstellar dust and gas which are leftovers from its stellar formation around 300 million years ago. The star is located 1,850 light years (567.2 parsecs) from Earth in the constellation of Puppis.

== Planetary collision event ==
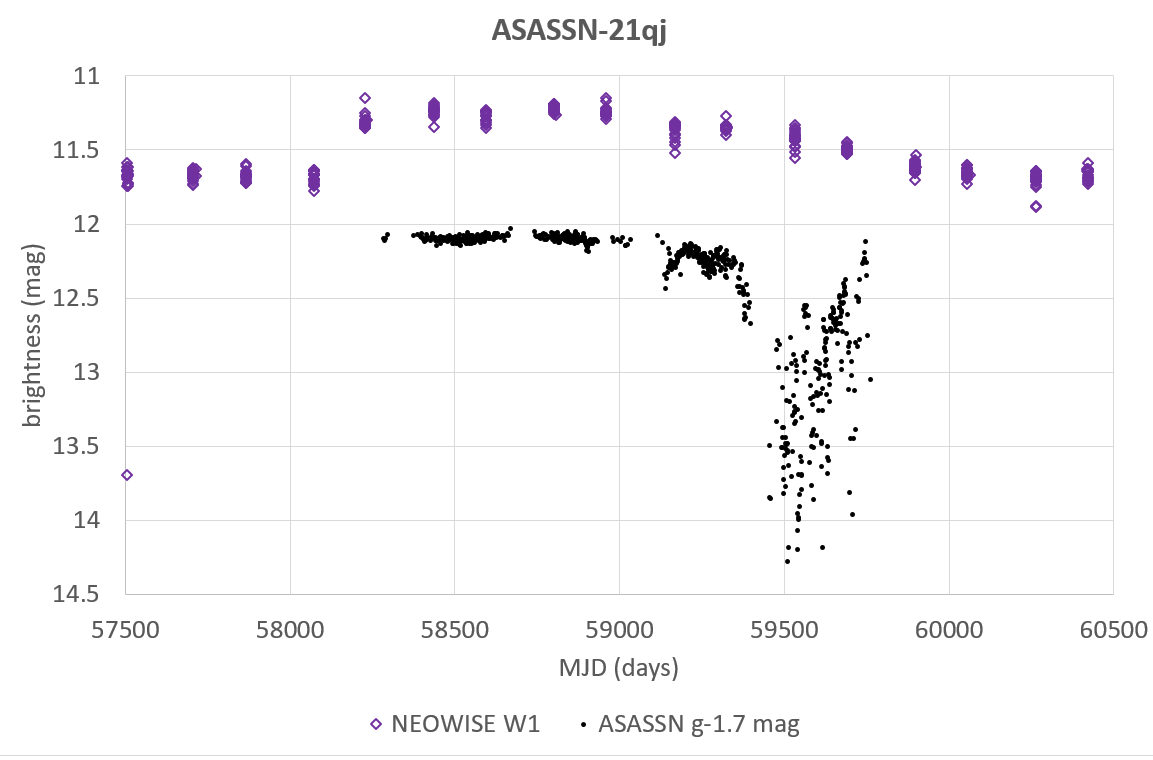
light curve showing the dimming event in black and the infrared brightening in violet above.

In 2021 the All-Sky Automated Survey for Supernovae reported that this star was rapidly fading. The published Astronomer's Telegram asked for follow-up observations. On twitter the astronomers Dr. Matthew Kenworthy and Dr. Eric Mamajek speculated about this object and amateur astronomer Arttu Sainio made his own investigation and discovered a brightening in NEOWISE data. He then joined the discussion on social media. The star brightened 2.5 years before the dimming event. More contributions came from amateur and professional astronomers, such as spectroscopic follow-up by amateur astronomers Hamish Barker, Sean Curry and the amateur Southern Spectroscopic project Observatory Team (2SPOT) members Stéphane Charbonnel, Pascal Le Dû, Olivier Garde, Lionel Mulato and Thomas Petit. Dr. Franz-Josef Hambsch observed this object with his remote observatory ROAD and submitted his observations to AAVSO. Other observations from professional telescope include ATLAS, ALMA, LCOGT and TESS.

In 2023, a scientific paper reported observations consistent with two ice-giant type exoplanets of several to tens of Earth masses having undergone a planetary collision event. The collision occurred at a distance of 2-16 AU (astronomical units) from the star. The infrared brightening is thought to be the result of dust produced by the disruption being heated by the collision, reaching a temperature of 1000 K (727°C; 1340°F) and then the dust slowly cooled off and expanded in size. Together with the newly formed planet, the dust cloud orbited the star and 1000 days later the dust moved in front of the star, causing a dimming event. Because of the dust cloud had now reached a large size, the dimming event would last for 600 days. The newly formed planet did not cause a transit.

Another work also studied the event in detail and concluded that the event was produced by the breakup of exocomets. This paper was later mentioned in an author correction of the first work. The system has been observed with JWST, with the data being studied by researchers.

A few other planetary collisions were discovered in the past, such as around NGC 2547–ID8, HD 166191 and V488 Persei.

== See also ==
- List of extrasolar planetary collisions
- BD+20°307
