= HD 166191 =

Star in the constellation Sagittarius

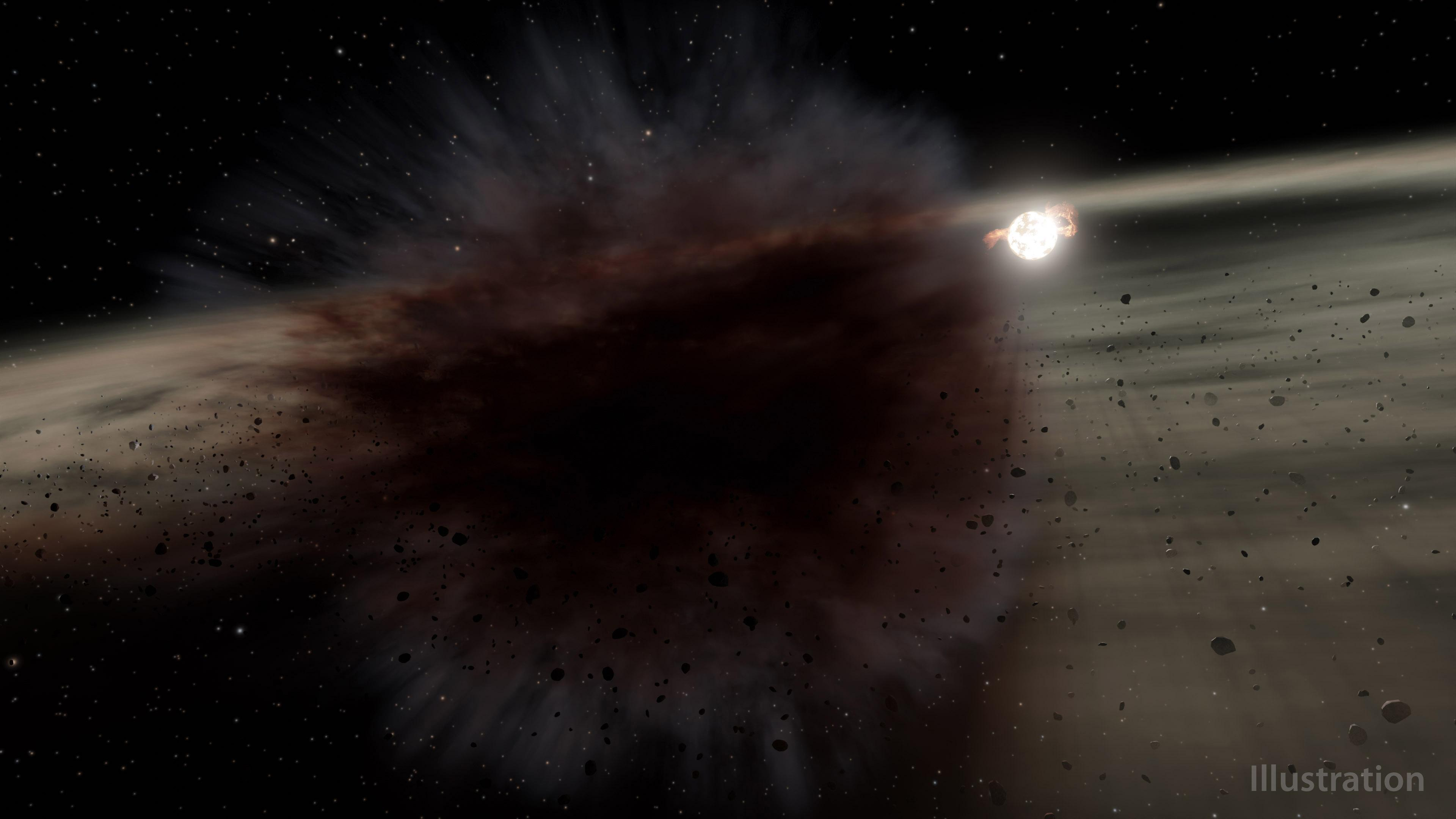
- Artist's impression of the collision of two planetesimals around HD 166191

Observation data Epoch J2000 Equinox J2000
- Constellation: Sagittarius
- Right ascension: 18^{h} 10^{m} 30.34^{s}
- Declination: −23° 34′ 00.27″
- Apparent magnitude (V): 8.35 ±0.02

Characteristics
- Evolutionary stage: main-sequence star
- Spectral type: F8 ±1 or G0V ±1

Astrometry
Radial velocity (R_{v})	–7.23 ±0.36 km/s
Proper motion (μ)	RA: –4.931 ±0.025 mas/yr Dec.: –39.349 ±0.019 mas/yr
Parallax (π)	9.8830±0.0232 mas
Distance	330.0 ± 0.8 ly (101.2 ± 0.2 pc)

Details
Mass	1.6 M_{☉}
Radius	2 R_{☉}
Luminosity	4.1 L_{☉}
Temperature	6000 K
Rotational velocity (v sin i)	27 ±1 km/s
Age	~10 Myr

Other designations
- CD-23 14016, HIP 89046, IRAS 18074-2334, 2MASS J18103033-2334003, TYC 6843-1557-1, WISE J181030.32-233400.6, PPM 267987, GSC 06843-01557, UCAC2 22300839, YZ 113 12544, AKARI-IRC-V1 J1810303-233401, MSX6C G007.4400-02.1430

Database references
SIMBAD	data

HD 166191 is a young late-F or early G-type star in the constellation Sagittarius. It is surrounded by a large amount of dust. In 2019 it was reported in the Astronomer's Telegram that the star had brightened in the infrared, as was seen from Spitzer observations. A study was published in 2022, reporting on the result of a follow-up campaign. This study showed that a dust cloud as large as the star did transit in front of it. This cloud was produced from a giant collision between two planetesimals.

In early works the age of the system was not certain and ranged between 10–100 Myrs. The large amount of dust was interpreted as being produced by a recent collision of planetary embryos or by massive ongoing collisional grinding. A later work did determine a younger age. The star was observed with ground-based spectroscopy and with Herschel. The researchers did find that the star is surrounded by a protoplanetary disk with a hole in the center. The silicate feature was also determined to be similar to primordial object. This would make the disk a so-called transitional disk, meaning it lies in between protoplanetary and debris disk. Observations with the Submillimeter Array did however find a high amount of dust and only little amount of gas, indicating that the disk is a debris disk. Another work determined that the disk is made up of two debris belts. An inner belt at ~0.27 AU with a temperature of about 760 Kelvin (K) and an outer belt at ~5 AU with a temperature of about 175 K.

It was suggested that HD 166191 co-moves with HD 163296. This was questioned in a later work.

== 2018–2019 collision event ==
Follow-up observations of the 2018–2019 brightening event were carried out with Spitzer, ASAS-SN and the Hereford Arizona Observatory. The disk has become brighter in the infrared since early 2018, reaching a maximum in mid 2019. ASAS-SN observed a dip during the infrared brightening. 142 ± 0.3 days later the second dip was seen with both Spitzer and ASAS-SN, having a depth of ≳80% in the optical. The new dust from the collision was at first compact, having a size of 1 stellar diameter vertically and about 2–3 stellar diameters horizontally. After two orbital periods the clump grew larger, but also optical thinner and no further dips could be observed. The researchers find a semi-major axis of 0.62 AU for a circular orbit, but the researchers also point out that the orbit is likely eccentric. The collision released dust with a minimum mass of ~1–4 × 10^{23} g (between 0.3x and 1.2x the mass of Mercury) The researchers think that a collision occurred between two large bodies with a sizes of ≳500 km (larger than 4 Vesta). The event set off a chain reaction of impacts between the fragments of the first collision and other small bodies in the system.

The HD 166191 planetary system
Companion (in order from star)	Mass	Semimajor axis (AU)	Orbital period (days)	Eccentricity	Inclination (°)	Radius
inner disk	0.27 AU				—	—
planetesimal 1 (hypothetical, pre-impact)	>1.7–6.7 × 10^{−5} M_{🜨}	0.62	142	—	—	≥0.0785 R_{🜨}
planetesimal 2 (hypothetical, pre-impact)	>1.7–6.7 × 10^{−5} M_{🜨}	0.62	142	—	—	≥0.0785 R_{🜨}
outer disk	5 AU				—	—

== See also ==
- List of extrasolar planetary collisions
- List of stars that have unusual dimming periods
- 2MASS J08090250-4858172
- Giant impact hypothesis
