= HD 169142 =

Pre-main-sequence star in the constellation Sagittarius

- VLT/SPHERE image of the circumstellar disk and protoplanet candidate b around HD 169142. Credit: ESO VLT/SPHERE - Monash University - Iain Hammond et al., adapted and mixed by Meli_thev

Observation data Epoch J2000 Equinox ICRS
- Constellation: Sagittarius
- Right ascension: 18^{h} 24^{m} 29.7800^{s}
- Declination: −29° 46′ 49.3286″
- Apparent magnitude (V): 8.16

Characteristics
- Evolutionary stage: Herbig Ae/Be star
- Spectral type: A9III/IVe

Astrometry
Radial velocity (R_{v})	−3±2 km/s
Proper motion (μ)	RA: −2.335 mas/yr Dec.: −37.879 mas/yr
Parallax (π)	8.7053±0.0268 mas
Distance	375 ± 1 ly (114.9 ± 0.4 pc)

Details
Mass	1.55+0.03 −0.00 M_{☉}
Radius	1.52 ± 0.06 (Note: Calculated, using the Stefan-Boltzmann law and the star's effective temperature and luminosity, with respect to the solar nominal effective temperature of 5,772 K: $$\sqrt{\biggl(\frac{5,772}{7,250}\biggr)^4 \cdot 10^{0.76}} = 1.52\ R_\odot.$$) R_{☉}
Luminosity	5.75±0.13 L_{☉}
Surface gravity (log g)	4.34±0.05 cgs
Temperature	7250±125 K
Metallicity [Fe/H]	−0.50±0.33 dex
Rotation	0.33±0.04 days
Rotational velocity (v sin i)	48±2 km/s
Age	<20.00 Myr

Other designations
- CD−29 14904, TYC 6856-876-1, GSC 06856-00876, 2MASS J18242978-2946492

Database references
SIMBAD	data

HD 169142 is a single Herbig Ae/Be star. Its surface temperature is 7650±150 K. HD 169142 is depleted of heavy elements compared to the Sun, with a metallicity Fe/H index of −0.375±0.125, but is much younger at an age of 7.5±4.5 million years. The star is rotating slowly and has relatively low stellar activity for a Herbig Ae/Be star.

== Planetary system ==
The HD 169142 planetary system
Companion (in order from star)	Mass	Semimajor axis (AU)	Orbital period (days)	Eccentricity	Inclination (°)	Radius
b	3±2 M_{J}	37.2	—	—	13	—
protoplanetary disk	20–250 AU				13°	—

=== Disk ===
The star is surrounded by a complex, rapidly evolving protoplanetary disk with two gaps. In the 1995-2005 period the disk inner edge has moved inward by 0.3 AU. The dust of the disk is rich in polycyclic aromatic hydrocarbons and carbon monoxide.

A study using ALMA data found that the water (H_{2}O) snow line is at around 20 astronomical units and the planet b is forming in beyond the water and carbon dioxide (CO_{2}) snow lines, but within the carbon monoxide (CO) snow line. The CO snow line lies at around 150 AU.

The study also detected a range of molecules in the disk: diazenylium (N_{2}H^{+}), methanol (CH_{3}OH), [CI], deuterated hydrogen cyanide (DCN), carbon monosulfide (CS, C^{34}S, ^{13}CS), thioformaldehyde (H_{2}CS), formaldehyde (H_{2}CO), cyanoacetylene (HC_{3}N), cyclopropenylidene (c-C_{3}H_{2}), sulfur monoxide (SO, previously detected) and deuterated aldehyde (DCO, previously detected). The detection of methanol in this warm disk is interpreted as a leftover from an earlier and colder stage of the disk. The methanol is now sublimating in this warmer phase. This means that complex ices can survive the disk formation process.

=== Planet ===
The annular gap and inner cavity observed in this protoplanetary disk both suggested the presence of embedded planets. Several protoplanet candidates have been suggested in the literature starting from 2014.

Nonetheless, a particular protoplanet candidate detected in 2015 and 2017 with the SPHERE instrument on the VLT appears to stand out, hereafter HD 169142 b. A paper from 2023 confirmed that the motion of this protoplanet candidate was consistent with Keplerian motion. The object shifted with a change of the position angle of 10.2±2.8° between 2015 and 2019. The researchers point out three lines of evidence arguing in favour of this object being a protoplanet:

1. The object is found in annular gap separating the two bright rings of the disc, as predicted in theory
2. The protoplanet moved between 2015, 2017 and 2019 consistent with Keplerian motion of an object at a distance of about 37 astronomical units from its star.
3. A spiral-shaped signal consistent with the expected outer spiral wake triggered by a planet in the gap, based on simulations of the system.

The researchers also found the near-infrared colors of the object are consistent with starlight scattered by dust around the protoplanet. This dust could be a circumplanetary disk or a dusty envelope around the protoplanet.

A study from June 2023, using archived ALMA data found sulfur monoxide and silicon monosulfide in the disk at the position of planet b. The paper also found compact ^{12}CO and ^{13}CO emission at the position of the planet. Carbon monoxide and sulfur monoxide were detected in other disks in the past and they are thought to be connected to protoplanets. Silicon monosulfide on the other hand was never before detected in any other disk and can only be detected if silicates are released from nearby dust grains in massive shock waves caused by gas travelling at high velocities. It is thought that planet b is driving an outflow causing these high velocities. Outflows from proto-jovian planets were hypothesised since 1998.

Outflows are known around isolated young proto-brown dwarfs, but HD 169142 b could be the first confirmed protoplanet around a star showing clear evidence of an outflow. Evidence for inflow or outflows suspected to be caused by planets exist for other disks, such as a signature in the CI gas of HD 163296.
