= Giant-impact hypothesis =

Hypothesis of the formation of the Moon

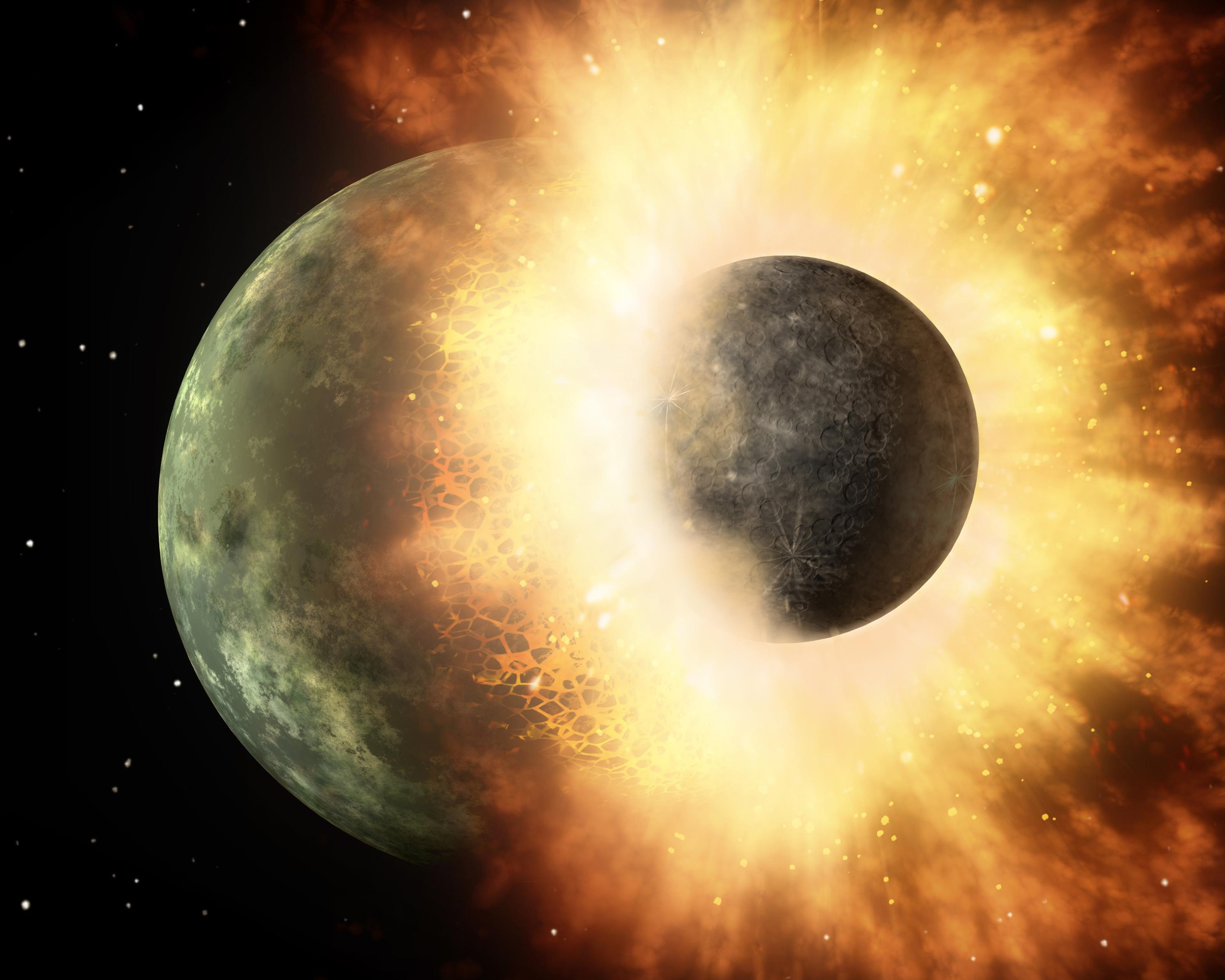
Artist's depiction of a collision between two planetary bodies. Such an impact between Earth and a Mars-sized object likely formed the Moon.

Animated seismic tomography showing the two large low-shear-velocity provinces (LLSVPs) at the Earth's core–mantle boundary, suspected to be sunken remnants of Theia's mantle

The giant-impact hypothesis, sometimes called the Theia Impact, is an astrogeology hypothesis for the formation of the Moon first proposed in 1946 by Canadian geologist Reginald Daly. The hypothesis suggests that the Proto-Earth collided with a Mars-sized co-orbital protoplanet likely from the L_{4} or L_{5} Lagrange points of the Earth's orbit approximately 4.5 billion years ago in the early Hadean eon (about 20 to 100 million years after the Solar System formed), and some of the ejected debris from the impact event later re-accreted to form the Moon. The impactor planet is sometimes called Theia, named after the mythical Greek Titan who was the mother of Selene, the goddess of the Moon.

Analysis of lunar rocks published in a 2016 report suggests that the impact might have been a direct hit, causing a fragmentation and thorough mixing of both parent bodies.

The giant-impact hypothesis is currently the favored hypothesis for lunar formation among astronomers. Evidence that supports this hypothesis includes:

- The Moon's orbit has a similar orientation to Earth's rotation, both of which are at a similar angle to the ecliptic plane of the Solar System.
- The stable isotope ratios of lunar and terrestrial rock are identical, implying a common origin.
- The Earth–Moon system contains an anomalously high angular momentum, meaning the momentum contained in Earth's rotation, the Moon's rotation and the Moon's orbit around Earth is significantly higher than those of the other terrestrial planets. A giant impact could supply this excess momentum.
- Moon samples indicate that the Moon was once molten to a substantial, but unknown, depth. This may have required much more energy than predicted to have been available from the accretion of a celestial body of the Moon's size and mass. An extremely energetic process, such as a giant impact, could provide this energy.
- The Moon has a relatively small iron core, which gives it a much lower density than Earth. Computer models of a giant impact of a Mars-sized body with Earth indicate the impactor's core would likely penetrate deep into Earth and fuse with its own core. If this occurred, it would leave the Moon, which was formed from coalesced ejectae of lighter crustal and mantle fragments that went far enough beyond the Roche limit and thus were not pulled back by Earth's gravity to re-fuse with Earth, with less remaining metallic iron than other planetary bodies.
- The Moon is depleted in volatile substances compared to Earth. Vaporizing at comparably lower temperatures, they could be lost in a high-energy event, with the Moon's smaller gravity unable to recapture them while Earth did.
- There is evidence in other star systems of similar collisions, resulting in debris discs.
- Giant collisions are consistent with the leading theory of the formation of the Solar System.

However, several questions remain concerning the best current models of the giant-impact hypothesis. The energy of such a giant impact is predicted to have heated Earth to produce a global magma ocean, and evidence of the resultant planetary differentiation of the heavier material sinking into Earth's mantle has been documented. However, there is no self-consistent model that starts with the giant-impact event and follows the evolution of the debris into a single moon.

== History ==
In 1898, George Darwin made the suggestion that Earth and the Moon were once a single body. Darwin's hypothesis was that a molten Moon had been spun from Earth because of centrifugal forces, and this became the dominant academic explanation. Using Newtonian mechanics, he calculated that the Moon had orbited much more closely in the past and was drifting away from Earth. This drifting was later confirmed by American and Soviet experiments, using laser ranging targets placed on the Moon.

Nonetheless, Darwin's calculations could not resolve the mechanics required to trace the Moon back to the surface of Earth. In 1946, Reginald Aldworth Daly of Harvard University challenged Darwin's explanation, adjusting it to postulate that the creation of the Moon was caused by an impact rather than centrifugal forces. Little attention was paid to Professor Daly's challenge until a conference on satellites in 1974, during which the idea was reintroduced and later published and discussed in Icarus in 1975 by William K. Hartmann and Donald R. Davis. Their models suggested that, at the end of the planet formation period, several satellite-sized bodies had formed that could collide with the planets or be captured. They proposed that one of these objects might have collided with Earth, ejecting refractory, volatile-poor dust that could coalesce to form the Moon. This collision could potentially explain the unique geological and geochemical properties of the Moon.

A similar approach was taken by Canadian astronomer Alastair G. W. Cameron and American astronomer William R. Ward, who suggested that the Moon was formed by the tangential impact upon Earth of a body the size of Mars. It is hypothesized that most of the outer silicates of the colliding body would be vaporized, whereas a metallic core would not. Hence, most of the collisional material sent into orbit would consist of silicates, leaving the coalescing Moon deficient in iron. The more volatile materials that were emitted during the collision probably would escape the Solar System, whereas silicates would tend to coalesce.

Eighteen months prior to an October 1984 conference on lunar origins, William K. Hartmann, Roger Phillips, and Jeff Taylor challenged fellow lunar scientists: "You have eighteen months. Go back to your Apollo data, go back to your computer, and do whatever you have to, but make up your mind. Don't come to our conference unless you have something to say about the Moon's birth." At the 1984 conference at Kona, Hawaii, the giant-impact hypothesis emerged as the most favored hypothesis.

Before the conference, there were partisans of the three "traditional" theories, plus a few people who were starting to take the giant impact seriously, and there was a huge apathetic middle who didn't think the debate would ever be resolved. Afterward, there were essentially only two groups: the giant impact camp and the agnostics.

== Theia ==
According to the hypothesis, Theia formed at the L_{4} Lagrange point, then went into a chaotic orbit, approached the Earth, and collided with it. One "loop" of the orbit takes one year. The Earth is shown stationary (rotating frame of reference). (Cartoon is not to scale.)

The name of the hypothesised protoplanet is derived from the mythical Greek titan Theia /ˈθiːə/, who gave birth to the Moon goddess Selene. This designation was proposed initially by the English geochemist Alex N. Halliday in 2000 and has become accepted in the scientific community. According to modern theories of planet formation, Theia was part of a population of Mars-sized bodies that existed in the Solar System 4.5 billion years ago. Theia is hypothesized to have orbited in the L_{4} or L_{5} configuration presented by the Earth–Sun system, where it would tend to remain. One of the attractive features of the giant-impact hypothesis is that the formation of the Moon and Earth align; during the course of its formation, Earth is thought to have experienced dozens of collisions with planet-sized bodies. The Moon-forming collision would have been only one such "giant impact" but certainly the last significant impactor event. The Late Heavy Bombardment by much smaller asteroids may have occurred later – approximately 3.9 billion years ago.

== Basic model ==
Simulation of the formation of the moon caused by a giant impact

Astronomers think the collision between Earth and Theia happened at about 4.4 to 4.45 billion years ago (bya); about 0.1 billion years after the Solar System began to form. In astronomical terms, the impact would have been of moderate velocity. Theia is thought to have struck Earth at an angle of about 45° when Earth was nearly fully formed. Computer simulations of this "late-impact" scenario suggest an initial impactor velocity below 4 kilometres per second (2.5 mi/s) at "infinity" (far enough that gravitational attraction is not a factor), increasing as it approached to over 9.3 km/s (5.8 mi/s) at impact, and an impact angle of about 45°. However, oxygen isotope abundance in lunar rock suggests "vigorous mixing" of Theia and Earth, indicating a steep impact angle. Theia's iron core would have sunk into the young Earth's core, and most of Theia's mantle accreted onto Earth's mantle. However, a significant portion of the mantle material from both Theia and Earth would have been ejected into orbit around Earth (if ejected with velocities between orbital velocity and escape velocity) or into individual orbits around the Sun (if ejected at higher velocities).

Modelling has hypothesised that material in orbit around Earth may have accreted to form the Moon in three consecutive phases, accreting first from the bodies initially present outside Earth's Roche limit, which acted to confine the inner disk material within the Roche limit. The inner disk slowly and viscously spread back out to Earth's Roche limit, pushing along outer bodies via resonant interactions. After several tens of years, the disk spread beyond the Roche limit, and started producing new objects that continued the growth of the Moon, until the inner disk was depleted in mass after several hundreds of years. Material in stable Kepler orbits was thus likely to hit the Earth–Moon system sometime later (because the Earth–Moon system's Kepler orbit around the Sun also remains stable). Estimates based on computer simulations of such an event suggest that some twenty percent of the original mass of Theia would have ended up as an orbiting ring of debris around Earth, and about half of this matter coalesced into the Moon. Earth would have gained significant amounts of angular momentum and mass from such a collision. Regardless of the speed and tilt of Earth's rotation before the impact, it would have experienced a day some five hours long after the impact, and Earth's equator and the Moon's orbit would have become coplanar.

Not all of the ring material need have been swept up right away: the thickened crust of the Moon's far side suggests the possibility that a second moon about 1,000 km (620 mi) in diameter formed in a Lagrange point of the Moon. The smaller moon may have remained in orbit for tens of millions of years. As the two moons migrated outward from Earth, solar tidal effects would have made the Lagrange orbit unstable, resulting in a slow-velocity collision that "pancaked" the smaller moon onto what is now the far side of the Moon, adding material to its crust. Lunar magma cannot pierce through the thick crust of the far side, causing fewer lunar maria, while the near side has a thin crust displaying the large maria visible from Earth.

Above a high resolution threshold for simulations, a study published in 2022 finds that giant impacts can immediately place a satellite with similar mass and iron content to the Moon into orbit far outside Earth's Roche limit. Even satellites that initially pass within the Roche limit can reliably and predictably survive, by being partially stripped and then torqued onto wider, stable orbits. Furthermore, the outer layers of these directly formed satellites are molten over cooler interiors and are composed of around 60% proto-Earth material. This could alleviate the tension between the Moon's Earth-like isotopic composition and the different signature expected for the impactor. Immediate formation opens up new options for the Moon's early orbit and evolution, including the possibility of a highly tilted orbit to explain the lunar inclination, and offers a simpler, single-stage scenario for the origin of the Moon.

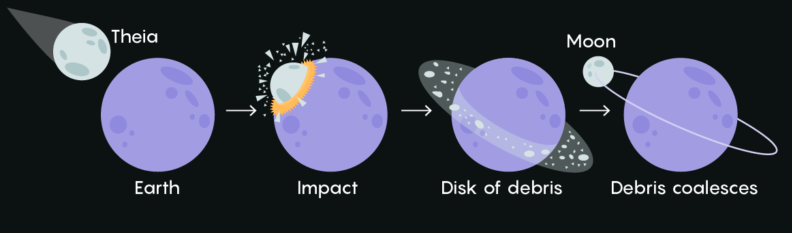
Simplistic representation of the giant-impact hypothesis

== Composition ==
In 2001, a team at the Carnegie Institution of Washington reported that the rocks from the Apollo program carried an isotopic signature that was identical with rocks from Earth, and were different from almost all other bodies in the Solar System.

In 2014, a team in Germany reported that the Apollo samples had a slightly different isotopic signature from Earth rocks. The difference was slight, but statistically significant. One possible explanation is that Theia formed near Earth.

This empirical data showing close similarity of composition can be explained only by the standard giant-impact hypothesis, as it is extremely unlikely that two bodies prior to collision had such similar composition.

=== Equilibration hypothesis ===
In 2007, researchers from the California Institute of Technology showed that the likelihood of Theia having an identical isotopic signature as Earth was very small (less than 1 percent). They proposed that in the aftermath of the giant impact, while Earth and the proto-lunar disc were molten and vaporised, the two reservoirs were connected by a common silicate vapor atmosphere and that the Earth–Moon system became homogenised by convective stirring while the system existed in the form of a continuous fluid. Such an "equilibration" between the post-impact Earth and the proto-lunar disc is the only proposed scenario that explains the isotopic similarities of the Apollo rocks with rocks from Earth's interior. For this scenario to be viable, however, the proto-lunar disc would have to endure for about 100 years. Work is ongoing to determine whether or not this is possible.

=== Direct collision hypothesis ===
According to research (2012) to explain similar compositions of the Earth and the Moon based on simulations at the University of Bern by physicist Andreas Reufer and his colleagues, Theia collided directly with Earth instead of barely swiping it. The collision speed may have been higher than originally assumed, and this higher velocity may have totally destroyed Theia. According to this modification, the composition of Theia is not so restricted, making a composition of up to 50% water ice possible.

=== Synestia hypothesis ===
One effort, in 2018, to homogenise the products of the collision was to energise the primary body by way of a greater pre-collision rotational speed. This way, more material from the primary body would be spun off to form the Moon. Further computer modelling determined that the observed result could be obtained by having the pre-Earth body spinning very rapidly, so much so that it formed a new celestial object which was given the name 'synestia'. This is an unstable state that could have been generated by yet another collision to get the rotation spinning fast enough. Further modelling of this transient structure has shown that the primary body spinning as a doughnut-shaped object (the synestia) existed for about a century (a very short time) before it cooled down and gave birth to Earth and the Moon.

=== Terrestrial magma ocean hypothesis ===
Another model, in 2019, to explain the similarity of Earth and the Moon's compositions posits that shortly after Earth formed, it was covered by a sea of hot magma, while the impacting object was likely made of solid material. Modelling suggests that this would lead to the impact heating the magma much more than solids from the impacting object, leading to more material being ejected from the proto-Earth, so that about 80% of the Moon-forming debris originated from the proto-Earth. Many prior models had suggested 80% of the Moon coming from the impactor.

== Evidence ==
Indirect evidence for the giant impact scenario comes from rocks collected during the Apollo Moon landings, which show oxygen isotope ratios nearly identical to those of Earth. The highly anorthositic composition of the lunar crust, as well as the existence of KREEP-rich samples, suggest that a large portion of the Moon once was molten; and a giant impact scenario could easily have supplied the energy needed to form such a magma ocean. Several lines of evidence show that if the Moon has an iron-rich core, it must be a small one. In particular, the mean density, moment of inertia, rotational signature, and magnetic induction response of the Moon all suggest that the radius of its core is less than about 25% the radius of the Moon, in contrast to about 50% for most of the other terrestrial bodies. Appropriate impact conditions satisfying the angular momentum constraints of the Earth–Moon system yield a Moon formed mostly from the mantles of Earth and the impactor, while the core of the impactor accretes to Earth. Earth has the highest density of all the planets in the Solar System; the absorption of the core of the impactor body explains this observation, given the proposed properties of the early Earth and Theia.

Comparison of the zinc isotopic composition of lunar samples with that of Earth and Mars rocks provides further evidence for the impact hypothesis. Zinc is strongly fractionated when volatilised in planetary rocks, but not during normal igneous processes, so zinc abundance and isotopic composition can distinguish the two geological processes. Moon rocks contain more heavy isotopes of zinc, and overall less zinc, than corresponding igneous Earth or Mars rocks, which is consistent with zinc being depleted from the Moon through evaporation, as expected for the giant impact origin.

Collisions between ejecta escaping Earth's gravity and asteroids would have left impact heating signatures in stony meteorites; analysis based on assuming the existence of this effect has been used to date the impact event to 4.47 billion years ago, in agreement with the date obtained by other means.

Warm silica-rich dust and abundant SiO gas, products of high velocity impacts – over 10 km/s (6.2 mi/s) – between rocky bodies, have been detected by the Spitzer Space Telescope around the nearby (29 pc distant) young (~12 My old) star HD 172555 in the Beta Pictoris moving group. A belt of warm dust in a zone between 0.25AU and 2AU from the young star HD 23514 in the Pleiades cluster appears similar to the predicted results of Theia's collision with the embryonic Earth, and has been interpreted as the result of planet-sized objects colliding with each other. A similar belt of warm dust was detected around the star BD+20°307 (HIP 8920, SAO 75016).

On 1 November 2023, scientists reported that, according to computer simulations, remnants of Theia could be still visible inside the Earth as two giant anomalies of the Earth's mantle.

== Difficulties ==
This lunar origin hypothesis has some difficulties that have yet to be resolved. For example, the giant-impact hypothesis implies that a surface magma ocean would have formed following the impact. Yet there is no evidence that Earth ever had such a magma ocean and it is likely there exists material that has never been processed in a magma ocean.

=== Composition ===
A number of compositional inconsistencies need to be addressed.

- The ratios of the Moon's volatile elements are not explained by the giant-impact hypothesis. If the giant-impact hypothesis is correct, these ratios must be due to some other cause.
- The presence of volatiles such as water trapped in lunar basalts and carbon emissions from the lunar surface is more difficult to explain if the Moon was caused by a high-temperature impact.
- The iron oxide (FeO) content (13%) of the Moon, intermediate between that of Mars (18%) and the terrestrial mantle (8%), rules out most of the source of the proto-lunar material from Earth's mantle.
- If the bulk of the proto-lunar material had come from an impactor, the Moon should be enriched in siderophilic elements, when, in fact, it is deficient in them.
- The Moon's oxygen isotopic ratios are essentially identical to those of Earth. Oxygen isotopic ratios, which may be measured very precisely, yield a unique and distinct signature for each Solar System body. If a separate proto-planet Theia had existed, it probably would have had a different oxygen isotopic signature than Earth, as would the ejected mixed material.
- The Moon's titanium isotope ratio (^{50}Ti/^{47}Ti) appears so close to Earth's (within 4 ppm), that little if any of the colliding body's mass could likely have been part of the Moon.

=== Lack of a Venusian moon ===
If the Moon was formed by such an impact, it is possible that other inner planets also may have been subjected to comparable impacts. A moon that formed around Venus by this process would have been unlikely to escape. If such a moon-forming event had occurred there, a possible explanation of why the planet does not have such a moon might be that a second collision occurred that countered the angular momentum from the first impact. Another possibility is that the strong tidal forces from the Sun would tend to destabilise the orbits of moons around close-in planets. For this reason, if Venus's slow rotation rate began early in its history, any satellites larger than a few kilometers in diameter would likely have spiraled inwards and collided with Venus.

Simulations of the chaotic period of terrestrial planet formation suggest that impacts like those hypothesised to have formed the Moon were common. For typical terrestrial planets with a mass of 0.5 to 1 Earth masses, such an impact typically results in a single moon containing 4% of the host planet's mass. The inclination of the resulting moon's orbit is random, but this tilt affects the subsequent dynamic evolution of the system. For example, some orbits may cause the moon to spiral back into the planet. Likewise, the proximity of the planet to the star will also affect the orbital evolution. The net effect is that it is more likely for impact-generated moons to survive when they orbit more distant terrestrial planets and are aligned with the planetary orbit.

== Possible origin of Theia ==
One suggested pathway for the impact as viewed from the direction of Earth's south pole (not to scale)

In 2004, Princeton University mathematician Edward Belbruno and astrophysicist J. Richard Gott III proposed that Theia coalesced at the L_{4} or L_{5} Lagrangian point relative to Earth (in about the same orbit and about 60° ahead or behind), similar to a trojan asteroid. Two-dimensional computer models suggest that the stability of Theia's proposed trojan orbit would have been affected when its growing mass exceeded a threshold of approximately 10% of Earth's mass (the mass of Mars). In this scenario, gravitational perturbations by planetesimals caused Theia to depart from its stable Lagrangian location, and subsequent interactions with proto-Earth led to a collision between the two bodies.

In 2008, evidence was presented that suggests that the collision might have occurred later than the accepted value of 4.53 Gya, at approximately 4.48 Gya. A 2014 comparison of computer simulations with elemental abundance measurements in Earth's mantle indicated that the collision occurred approximately 95 My after the formation of the Solar System.

It has been suggested that other significant objects might have been created by the impact, which could have remained in orbit between Earth and the Moon, stuck in Lagrangian points. Such objects might have stayed within the Earth–Moon system for as long as 100 million years, until the gravitational tugs of other planets destabilised the system enough to free the objects. A study published in 2011 suggested that a subsequent collision between the Moon and one of these smaller bodies caused the notable differences in physical characteristics between the two hemispheres of the Moon. This collision, simulations have supported, would have been at a low enough velocity so as not to form a crater; instead, the material from the smaller body would have spread out across the Moon (in what would become its far side), adding a thick layer of highlands crust. The resulting mass irregularities would subsequently produce a gravity gradient that resulted in tidal locking of the Moon so that today, only the near side remains visible from Earth. However, mapping by the GRAIL mission has ruled out this scenario.

In 2019, a team at the University of Münster reported that the molybdenum isotopic composition in Earth's primitive mantle originates from the outer Solar System, hinting at the source of water on Earth. One possible explanation is that Theia originated in the outer Solar System.

== Alternative hypotheses ==
Other mechanisms that have been suggested at various times for the Moon's origin are that the Moon was spun off from Earth's molten surface by centrifugal force; that it was formed elsewhere and was subsequently captured by Earth's gravitational field; or that Earth and the Moon formed at the same time and place from the same accretion disk. None of these hypotheses can account for the high angular momentum of the Earth–Moon system.

Another hypothesis attributes the formation of the Moon to the impact of a large asteroid with Earth much later than previously thought, creating the satellite primarily from debris from Earth. In this hypothesis, the formation of the Moon occurs 60–140 million years after the formation of the Solar System (as compared to hypothesized Theia impact at 4.527 ± 0.010 billion years). The asteroid impact in this scenario would have created a magma ocean on Earth and the proto-Moon with both bodies sharing a common plasma metal vapor atmosphere. The shared metal vapor bridge would have allowed material from Earth and the proto-Moon to exchange and equilibrate into a more common composition.

Yet another hypothesis proposes that the Moon and Earth formed together, not from the collision of once-distant bodies. This model, published in 2012 by Robin M. Canup, suggests that the Moon and Earth formed from a massive collision of two planetary bodies, each larger than Mars, which then re-collided to form what is now called Earth. After the re-collision, Earth was surrounded by a disk of material which accreted to form the Moon.

Moon – Oceanus Procellarum ("Ocean of Storms")

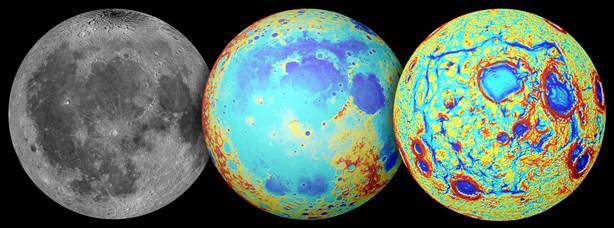
Ancient rift valleys – rectangular structure (visible – topography – GRAIL gravity gradients) (October 1, 2014)

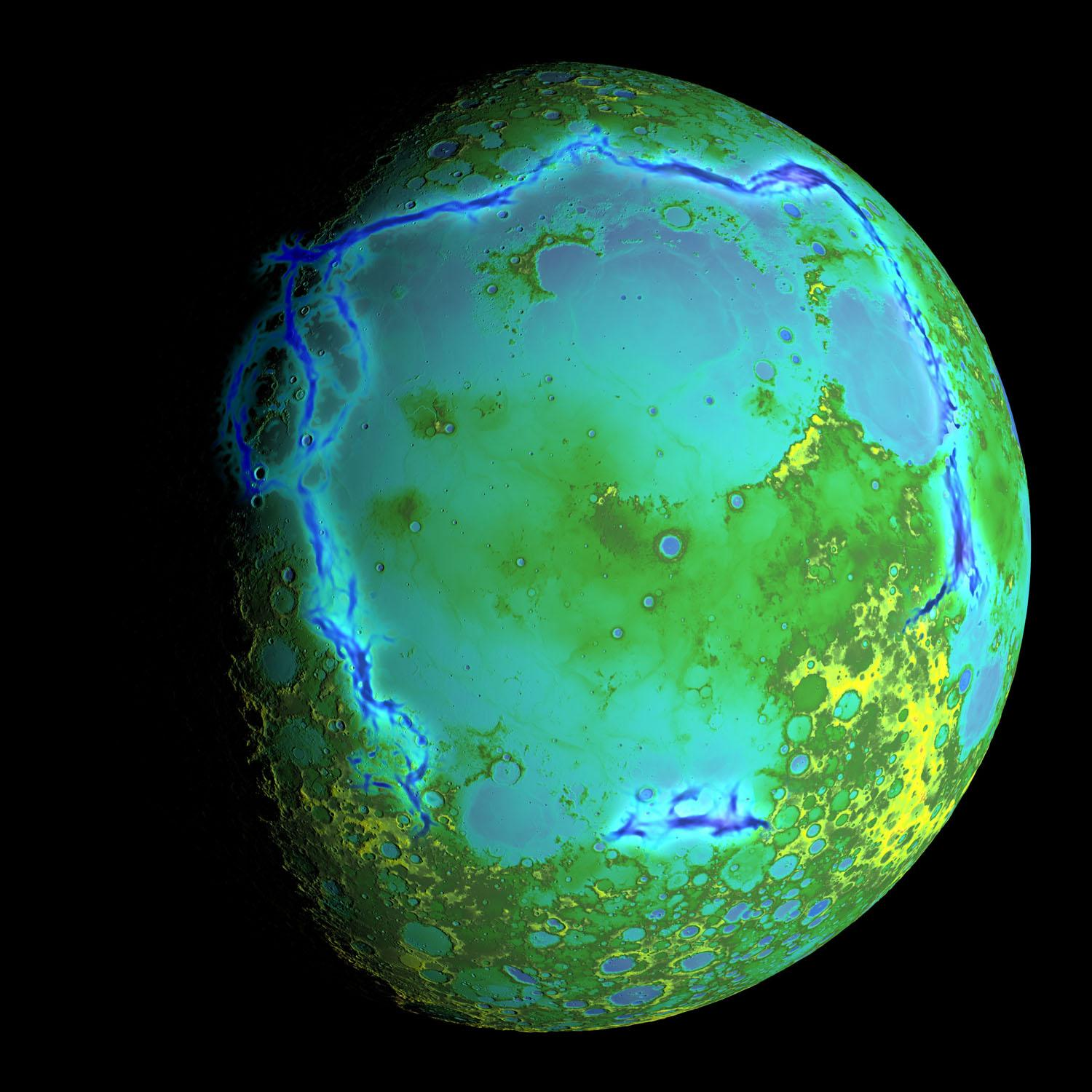
Ancient rift valleys – context

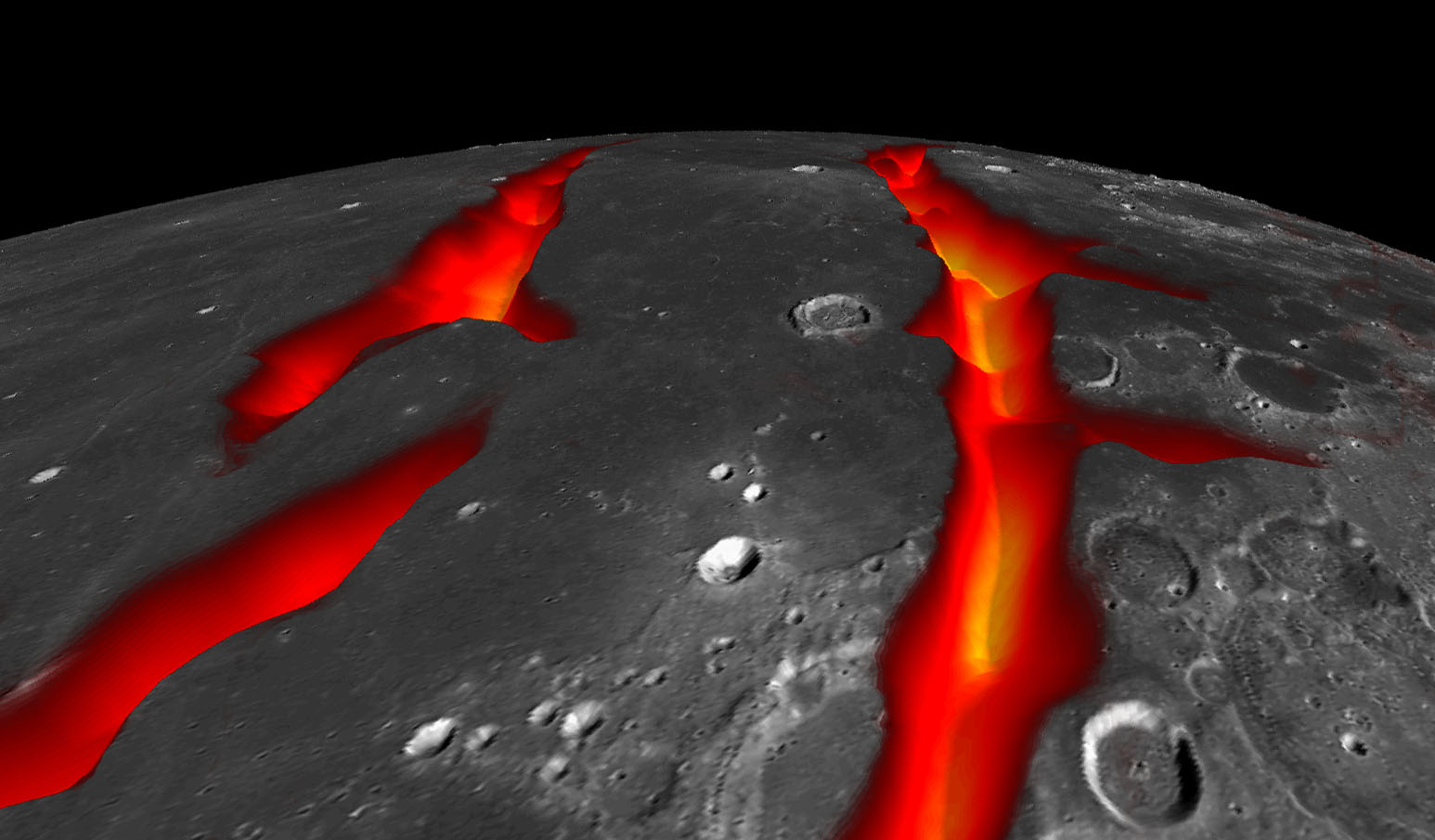
Ancient rift valleys – closeup (artist's concept)

== See also ==
- Circumplanetary disk
- Geologic time scale
- Geology of the Moon
- History of Earth
- Lunar geologic timescale
- Origin of the Moon
- Roche limit
- Phaeton (hypothetical planet)
