= HD 163296 =

Herbig Ae star in the constellation Sagittarius

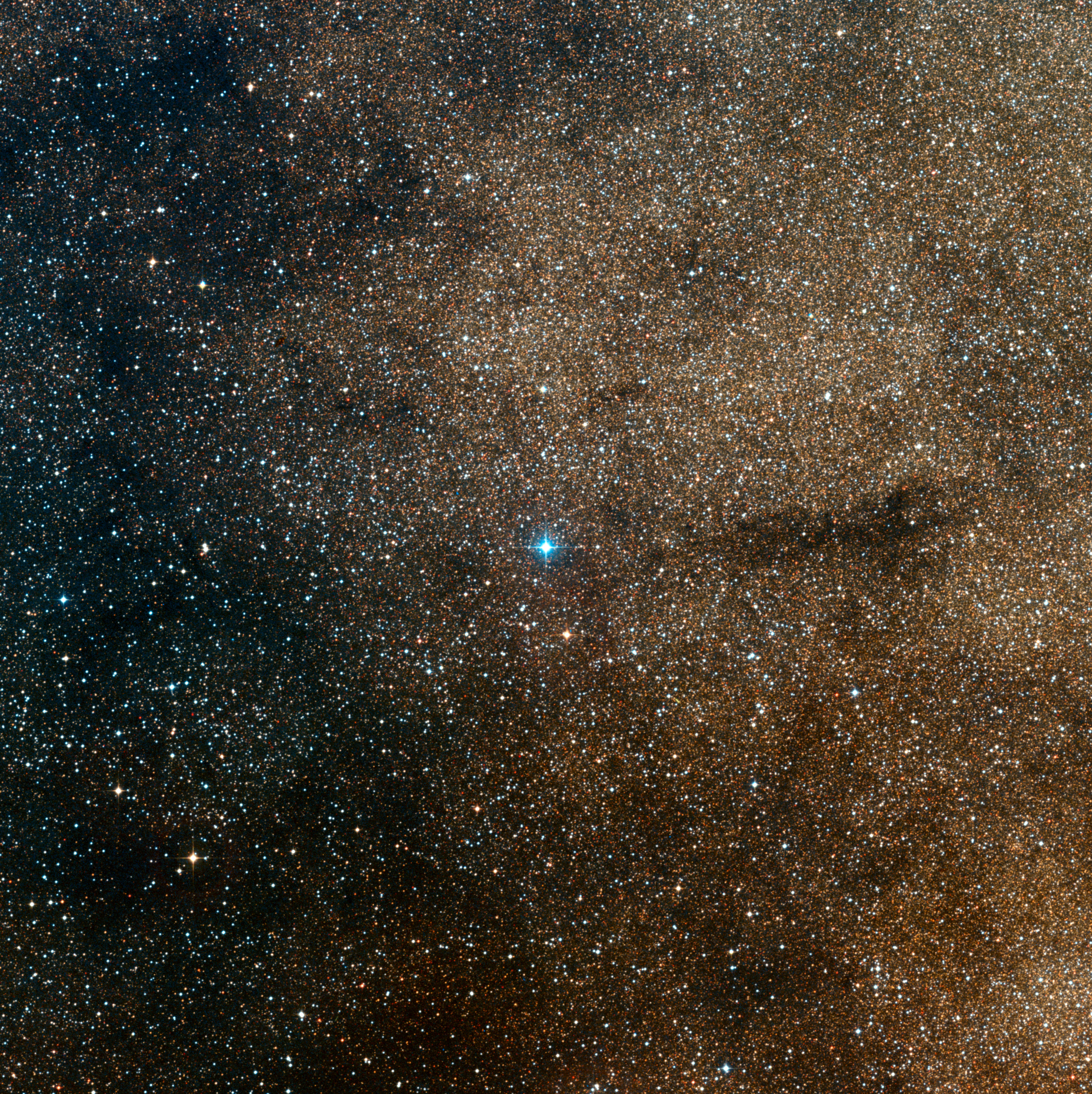
- HD 163296 and surroundings Credit: ESO/Digitized Sky Survey 2; Acknowledgement: Davide De Martin

Observation data Epoch J2000 Equinox J2000
- Constellation: Sagittarius
- Right ascension: 17^{h} 56^{m} 21.29^{s}
- Declination: −21° 57′ 21.9″
- Apparent magnitude (V): 6.85

Characteristics
- Evolutionary stage: Herbig Ae star
- Spectral type: A3VaekA1mA1

Astrometry
Radial velocity (R_{v})	−4.00±3.3 km/s
Proper motion (μ)	RA: −7.586±0.041 mas/yr Dec.: −39.458±0.029 mas/yr
Parallax (π)	9.9043±0.0408 mas
Distance	329 ± 1 ly (101.0 ± 0.4 pc)
Absolute magnitude (M_{V})	+1.51

Details
Mass	1.95±0.07 M_{☉}
Radius	1.87±0.05 R_{☉}
Luminosity	20.4+3.6 −3.0 L_{☉}
Surface gravity (log g)	4.10±0.10 cgs
Temperature	9000±250 K
Age	6.03+0.28 −0.27 Myr

Other designations
- BD−21 4779, CPD−21 6508, EM* MWC 275, HIP 87819, IRAS 17533-2156, 2MASS J17562128-2157218, PDS 473, TYC 6262-2131-1

Database references
SIMBAD	data

HD 163296 is a young Herbig Ae star surrounded by a protoplanetary disk. The disk is a popular target to study disk composition, and several works suggested the presence of protoplanets inside the gaps of the disk.

== Characteristics ==
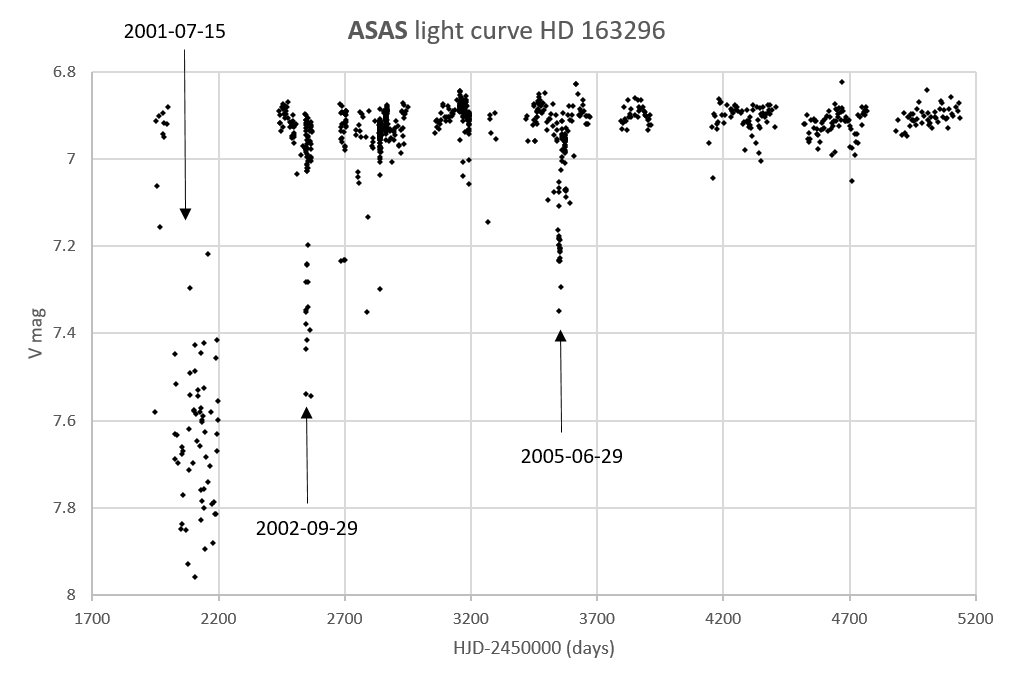
ASAS light curve of HD 163296, showing the dimming events in 2001, 2002 and 2005.

HD 163296 was first identified in the Henry Draper Catalogue. The star was first identified to have peculiar hydrogen emission lines in 1925, based on observations with the Mount Wilson Observatory by Paul W. Merrill, Milton L. Humason and Cora G. Burwell. The star was classified as having a spectral type of A2e. In 1984, it was first considered that HD 163296 is a Herbig Ae star due to the H-alpha and NaD lines having a P Cygni profile. The status as a Herbig Ae star was questioned at the time. It was, however concluded that it is surrounded by a dust shell from near-infrared excess. Later in 1989, it was found that magnesium and calcium lines have short-term variability from observations with the International Ultraviolet Explorer, showing that it is similar to the Herbig Ae star AB Aurigae. Observations with Hubble STIS showed Herbig-Haro nebulosity that is often associated with Herbig Ae stars. These nebulae are called HH 409 A/B/C. Additionally, a jet was detected with STIS in Lyman alpha and silicon emission, which had a velocity of 335-380 km/s. Observations with Chandra X-ray showed that the X-ray emission is dominated by accretion of material from the disk onto the star's surface. X-ray emission alongside the Ly-alpha jet was also detected. A team analysing XMM-Newton data concluded that the X-ray emission does not originate from the accretion shock, and the team proposed that the emission comes from the shock at the jet's base and the star's corona. The jet was also directly imaged with VLT/MUSE in H-alpha and sulfur emission lines.

The star's age was first determined to be 5 Myrs, but some recent works find an age of 10 Myrs. Other recent works find ages between 6–7 Myrs. The star is suspected to co-move with the young stellar object candidate 2MASS J17564004-2159530, with a separation of 30,600 AU. It is also suspected that the star could belong to a small moving group of 13 stars, called HSC 103. This group would have HD 163296 and HD 166191 as their brightest members. However, it is unclear if these stars belong to the same group.

The star experienced a dimming event in 2001, at which the V-band magnitude dropped by 0.8 and brightened in 2002 in the near-infrared. This was reproduced by modelling a jet-like feature and a disk wind. A disk wind is produced by the interaction of the star with the inner edge of the disk, which ejects dust and gas away from the disk. The drop in brightness was caused by a dust clump being ejected into the disk wind and blocking the light in the V-band, but increasing the near-infrared brightness.

== Planetary system ==
=== Protoplanetary disk ===
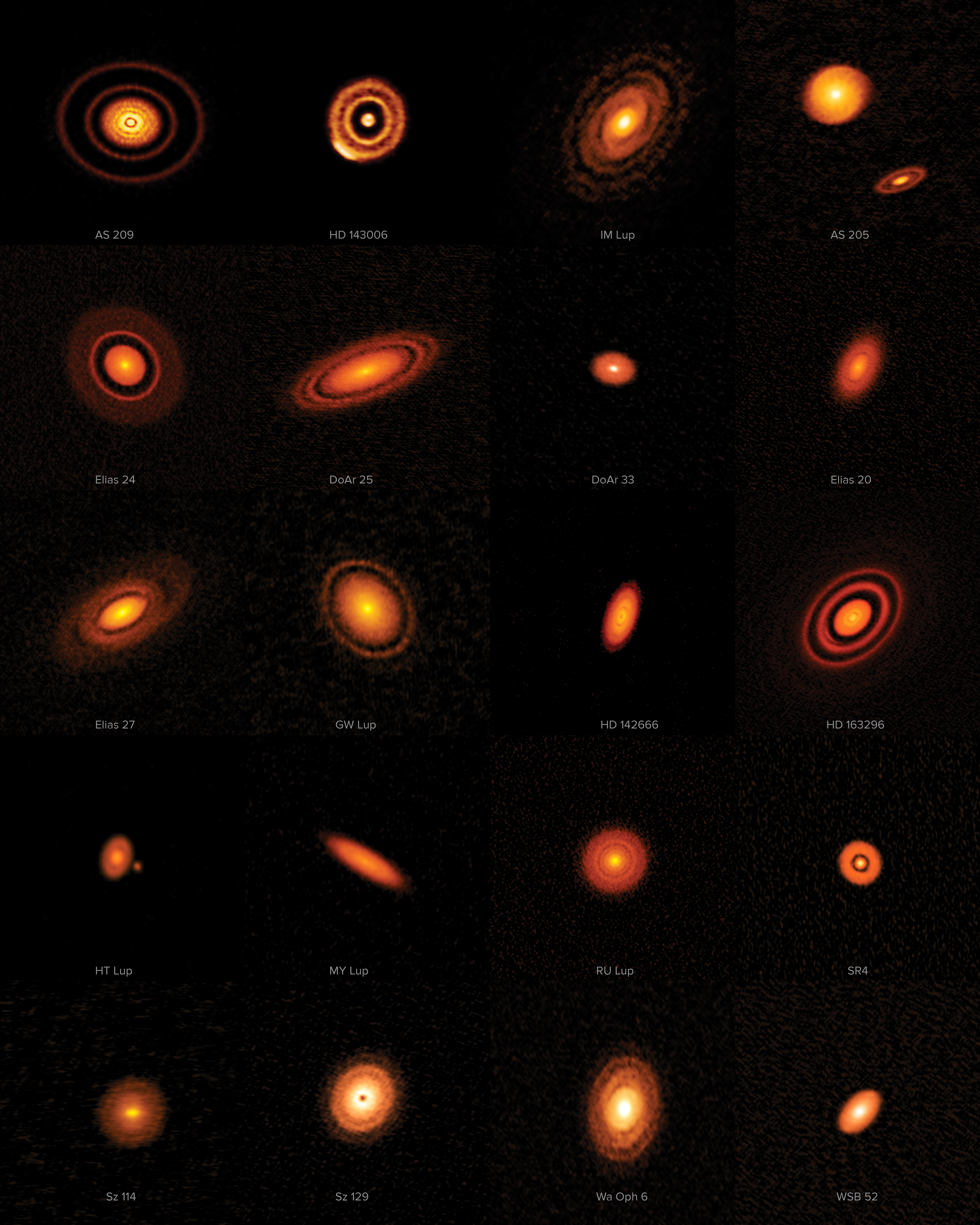
ALMA image of the disk around HD 163296 from DSHARP

A resolved circumstellar disk was first identified in 1997 with the Owens Valley Radio Observatory. The semi-major axis was initially estimated to be 110 AU. Observations with STIS revealed that the disk is much larger, with a radius of 450 AU, has an inclination of about 60±5°, and has a cleared central zone. An outer ring was discovered in scattered light with the Very Large Telescope (VLT) instrument NACO. The ring was initially seen as broken. Later, observations with the Gemini Planet Imager showed the complete ring. Notably, an offset exists between the star's position and the ring's outline. This is likely due to the scattered light on the disk's surface. A flared, inclined disk will make the ring appear to be offset. The scattered light images trace small dust grains. Atacama Large Millimeter Array (ALMA) dust observations showed multiple rings. The ALMA dust observations trace larger dust grains in the midplane of the disk. High-resolution ALMA dust and CO images were presented in 2018 by the DSHARP team. This new image showed the previously known rings, an inner ring with a gap, and a dust crescent near the B67 ring. The outer disk shows time-variable illumination between 2011 (Subaru) and 2016 (VLT/SPHERE). This time-dependent change is likely driven by shadows cast from the inner disk. New observations with STIS found an outer ring at 330 AU and also found time-variable changes. The disk has a total (gas+dust) mass of less than 0.35 M_{☉}, or between 0.01 and 0.15 M_{☉}. The B67 ring has a dust mass of 81 ±13 M_{🜨}, and the B100 ring has a dust mass of 82+26
−16 M_{🜨}.

==== Disk composition ====
In 1999, observations between 3 and 15 μm from the NASA Infrared Telescope Facility were published. The spectrum showed silicate emission, consistent with an olivine and pyroxene mixture. The study suggested that this is evidence of grains that will be incorporated into exocomets later. Observations with the Infrared Space Observatory were published in 2000. The team found amorphous silicates, water ice, iron oxide and a small fraction of very large (mm to cm-sized) crystalline silicates. Herschel/PACS observations detected warm water and the hydroxyl molecule. Observations with the Submillimeter Array showed that the carbon monoxide ice-line begins at around 155 AU. Later, ALMA observed carbon monoxide (CO) and other molecules in higher resolution. The CO snowline was detected with the help of DCO^{+} (deuterated aldehyde). Another analysis of ALMA data found that N_{2}H^{+} emission is a better tracer of the CO snowline, and this line is located at 90 AU (at 25 Kelvin). Formaldehyde was detected throughout the disk, but was found to be enhanced in the outer disk. This could be due to hydrogenation of CO ices on dust grains and sublimation of formaldehyde from UV-radiation. Alternatively, formaldehyde is more efficiently produced in the gas phase. Methanol was not detected in the disk around HD 163296. The abundance of methanol is lower when compared to TW Hydrae, likely due to a difference in stellar radiation. The water snowline has an upper limit of 8-20 AU from ALMA observations.

=== Possible exoplanets ===
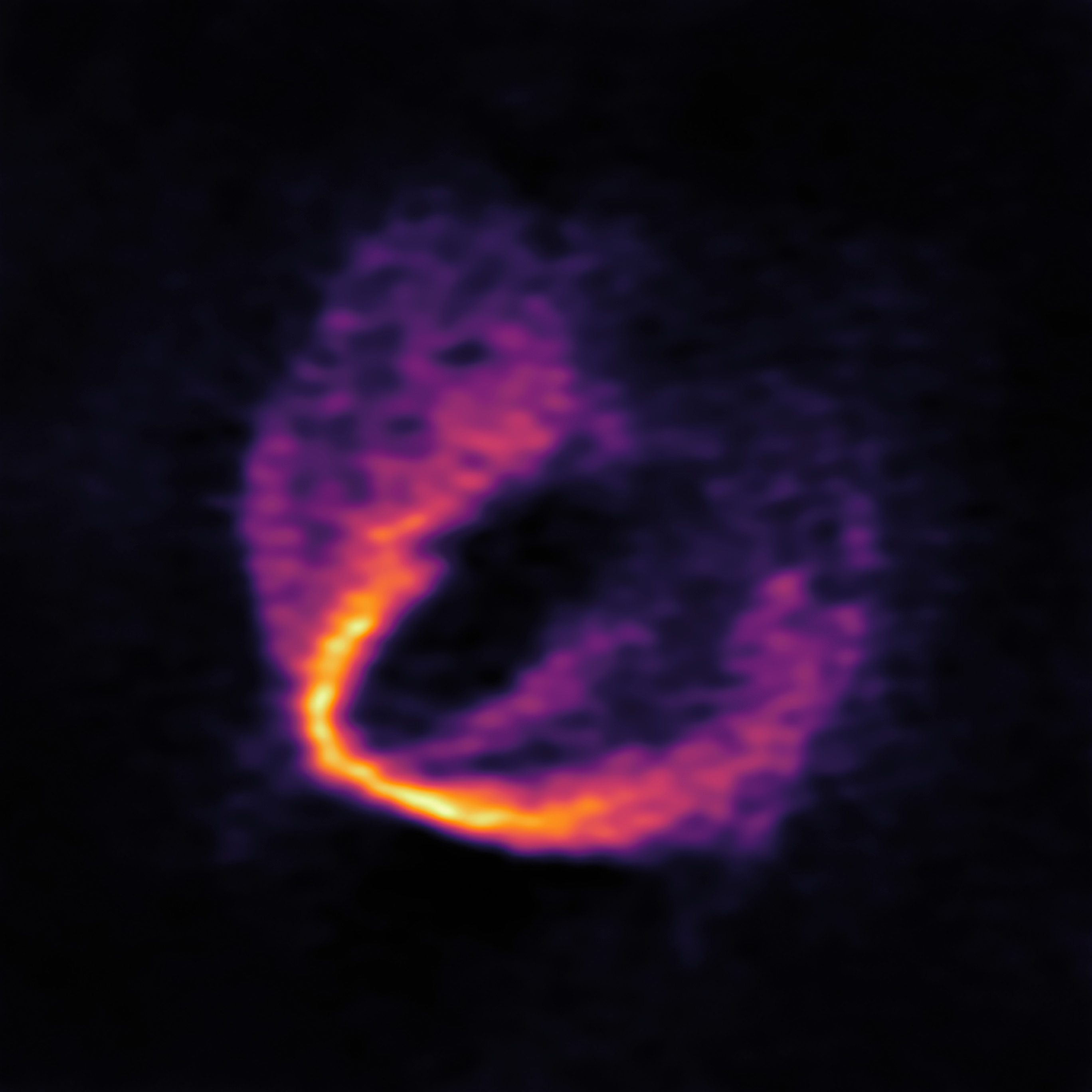
A CO map of the disk at a certain velocity shows a "kink" caused by a suspected planet.

The gaps in the disk around HD 163296 are thought to be carved by newly formed planets. As of 2023, four planets in the disk have been proposed. Below are the gaps and an explanation of candidate planets in those gaps:

D10 gap: One work suggests that a planet carves the gap with a mass of 0.35-0.71 M_{J}.

D45 gap: The crescent at 55 AU can be re-created by a 0.15 M_{J} planet at 54 AU. Another work estimated the mass to be 1.07-2.18 M_{J} from the size of the gap. Hydrodynamic simulations suggest a mass of 0.46 M_{J}. Later modelling found that a Jupiter-mass planet can explain the crescent-shaped asymmetry at 48 AU. The crescent represents dust with a mass between 10 and 15 M_{🜨}, trapped at Lagrange point L5 of the planet. Carbon emission localized at the position of the proposed planet at the D45 gap could represent protoplanet inflow/outflow or disk winds. Another work suggests that two sub-Saturn planets are inside the D45 gap and in a 4:3 orbital resonance. The crescent is seen as dust trapped in the L5 point of the outer planet.

D86 gap: Perturbations of the CO gas could be explained by a Jupiter-mass planet at 83 AU. One work suggests this planet could have a mass of 0.07-0.14 M_{J}. A point-like source at 67 AU was identified from Keck observations as a potential protoplanet with a mass of 6-7 M_{J}. It might be less massive if a circumplanetary disk surround the planet. The point-like Keck source was not detected SPHERE imaging, excluding it as a massive planet. It could still be a lower-mass planet if the spectrum is very red. A velocity kink in CO gas suggests the presence of a planet at 94 ±6 AU with a mass of 1 M_{J}.

D141 gap: Two Saturn-mass exoplanets were inferred from the gas and dust depletion of the middle and outer dust rings seen by ALMA. These planets would reside at 100 and 160 AU. It is, however, possible that no exoplanets are present and that other effects cause this observation. Perturbations of the CO gas could be explained by Jupiter-mass planets at 137 AU. Another work suggests a mass of 0.46 M_{J}, a distance of 105 AU, and another planet at 160 AU with a mass of 0.58 M_{J}. A point-like candidate was detected with NIRCam at 111 AU outside the B100 ring. This candidate is however at a different position compared to the velocity kink. A mass of 2-4 M_{J} is suggested. Follow-up observations are needed to confirm this candidate.

D270 gap: Another candidate was proposed from perturbation of the disk's gas, suggesting a 2 M_{J} planet at around 260 AU. This candidate was not detected with SPHERE, but could not be excluded. The spiral structure of the CO gas is explained by the planet, producing a planetary wake generated by Lindblad resonances.

The HD 163296 planetary system
Companion (in order from star)	Mass	Semimajor axis (AU)	Orbital period (years)	Eccentricity	Inclination (°)	Radius
D10 (gap)	9.96±0.07 AU				37.9±1.2°	—
B14 (inner disk)	<19.85 AU				47.24±0.64°	—
D45 (gap)	44.77±0.19 AU				42.22±0.67°	—
b	85 M_{🜨}	46	—	—	—	—
c	60 M_{🜨}	54	—	—	—	—
crescent	55 AU				—	—
B67 (ring)	63.80–70.36 AU				46.78±0.21°	—
d	127 M_{🜨}	84.5	—	—	—	—
D86 (gap)	86.61±0.22 AU				47.34±0.32°	—
B100 (ring)	98.26–104.06 AU				46.59±0.11°	—
e	1 M_{J}	137	—	—	—	—
D141 (gap)	140.62±0.96 AU				47.2±0.9°	—
B159 (ring)	158.7±1.2 AU				45.7±1.0°	—
D270	270 AU				—	—
4th ring	330 AU				—	—
