= V488 Persei =

Variable star in the Alpha Persei Cluster

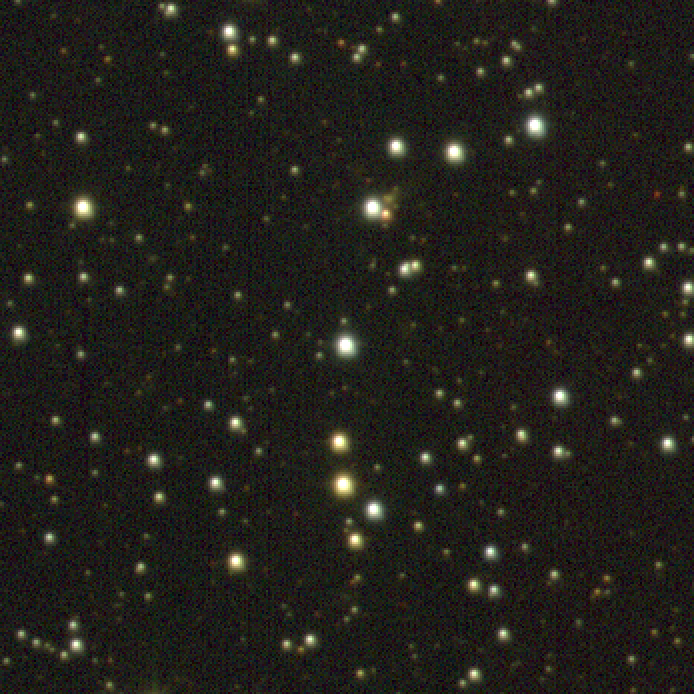
- V488 Persei (blue star in the middle) with the Zwicky Transient Facility

Observation data Epoch J2000 Equinox J2000
- Constellation: Perseus
- Right ascension: 03^{h} 28^{m} 18.68^{s}
- Declination: +48° 39′ 48.2″
- Apparent magnitude (V): 12.89 ±0.05

Characteristics
- Evolutionary stage: main-sequence star
- Spectral type: K2–K2.5V
- Variable type: BY Draconis variable

Astrometry
Radial velocity (R_{v})	–1.02 ±0.88 km/s
Proper motion (μ)	RA: 23.370 ±0.013 mas/yr Dec.: –25.879 ±0.013 mas/yr
Parallax (π)	5.7637±0.0121 mas
Distance	566 ± 1 ly (173.5 ± 0.4 pc)

Details
Mass	0.84 M_{☉}
Radius	0.76 R_{☉}
Luminosity	0.25 L_{☉}
Temperature	4700 K
Rotation	5.8 days
Rotational velocity (v sin i)	4.5 ±1.5 km/s
Age	80 Myr

Other designations
- Cl* Melotte 20 AP 70, 2MASS J03281868+4839482, TIC 410731676, V* V488 Per, WISEA J032818.69+483947.9, Gaia DR2 249236647249997696, AP J03281868+4839482, ATO J052.0779+48.6632

Database references
SIMBAD	data

V488 Persei is a variable star in the constellation Perseus. The star was first identified as a variable in 1985 from data of a 0.9 m telescope at Kitt Peak. The survey targeted stars of the Alpha Persei Cluster, for which the researchers found a few stars to be variable. The star AP 70, later called V488 Persei was found to be variable with a period of 123.5 hours. The star is a BY Draconis variable, which shows periodic variations due to starspots. In 2012 researchers found a debris disk with extreme infrared excess. The researchers suggested that this dust is the aftermath of the collision between two planetary embryos.

Candidate wide companions around V488 Persei were identified in 2015. Another work does point out problems with this approach, pointing out that wide companions cannot be distinguished from unrelated cluster members.

== The disk ==
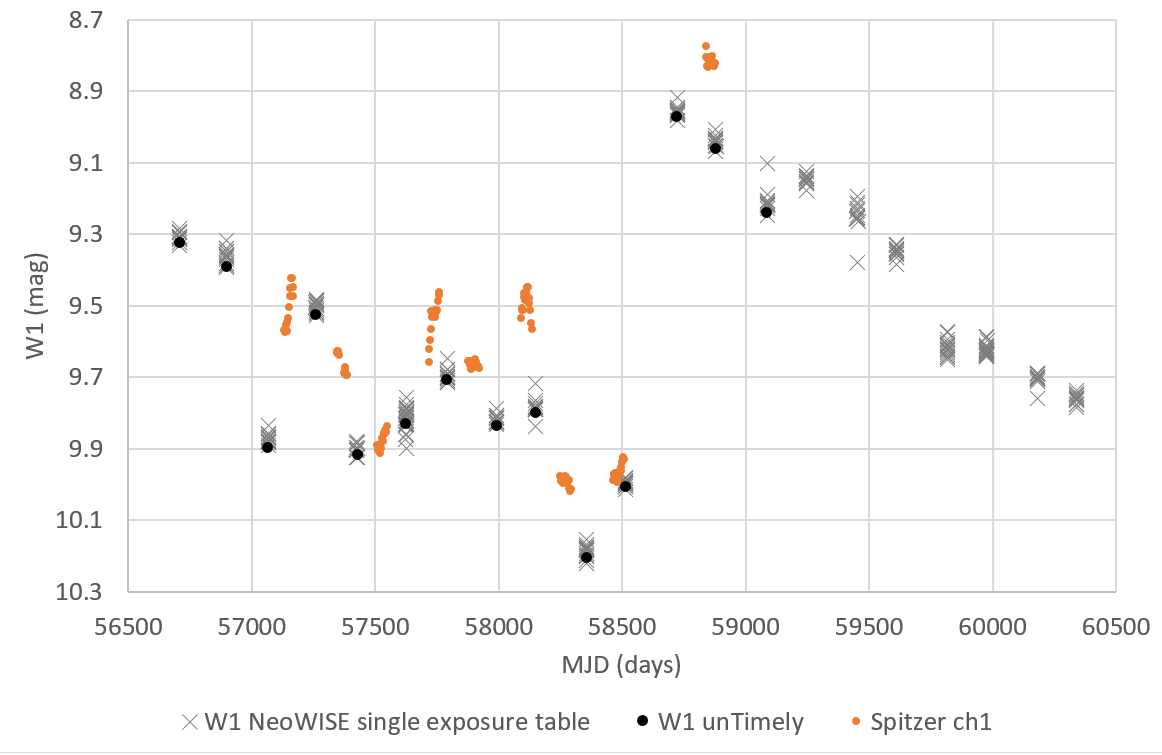
NEOWISE single exposure (gray crosses) and unTimely (black circles) light curves of the W1 filter of WISE. The Spitzer ch1 filter measurements from Rieke et al. are shown in orange. The 2019 event is clearly visible as a jump in brightness (between MJD 58500–58700) and the star shows constant fading since the event.

The disk was first found with Spitzer and WISE data. The researchers find dust with a temperature of about 800 Kelvin (K) at 0.06 astronomical units (AU). The researchers suspect that two planetary embroys collided with each other at distances similar to transiting rocky exoplanets, known at the time. At first it was suspected that the disk also contains a cold component at 120 K. Using far-infrared observations it was indeed found that the disk has a cold component with a temperature of around 130 K. There are currently two interpretations of the disk. One work interprets the infrared excess as two rings: an inner ring at 0.30–0.35 AU and an outer ring at 25–45 AU. Another work interprets the excess as two disks: an inner disk at around 0.07 AU and an outer disk at 2.7 AU.

In 2021 it was found that the infrared brightness of the system is extreme variable, similar to NGC 2547-ID8. This was found from an observation campaign with Spitzer. This work found that one major event occurred in 2019, leading to an increase of infrared brightness. This event was produced by the collision of two objects 60 km in size. The disk was however extreme before this event and variable over a period of 15 years, meaning additional collisions must take place in the disk. The same work suggests that the objects in an asteroid-like belt at 0.3 AU are perturbed by a giant planet or brown dwarf. This results in a high level of collisions between planetesimals and the dust will be dragged towards the star due to the stellar wind. A high level of collisions are happening in the inner region, because the dust is removed very fast. The system might be an analogue to the late heavy bombardment in the Solar System. Another work failed to detect silicate emission in the mid-infrared with Subaru/COMICS. The researchers interpret this as dust grains composed primarily of metallic iron. The researchers interpret this observation as a similar scenario that formed planet Mercury. In this scenario a rocky planet is subjected to erosive bombardment and the ejecta from the interior of the planet is ground into small particles. This scenario is more likely with an inner system packed with Earth-type and super-Earth-type planets.

== See also ==
- List of extrasolar planetary collisions
