= HD 113766 =

Binary star in the constellation Centaurus

HD 113766 A / B
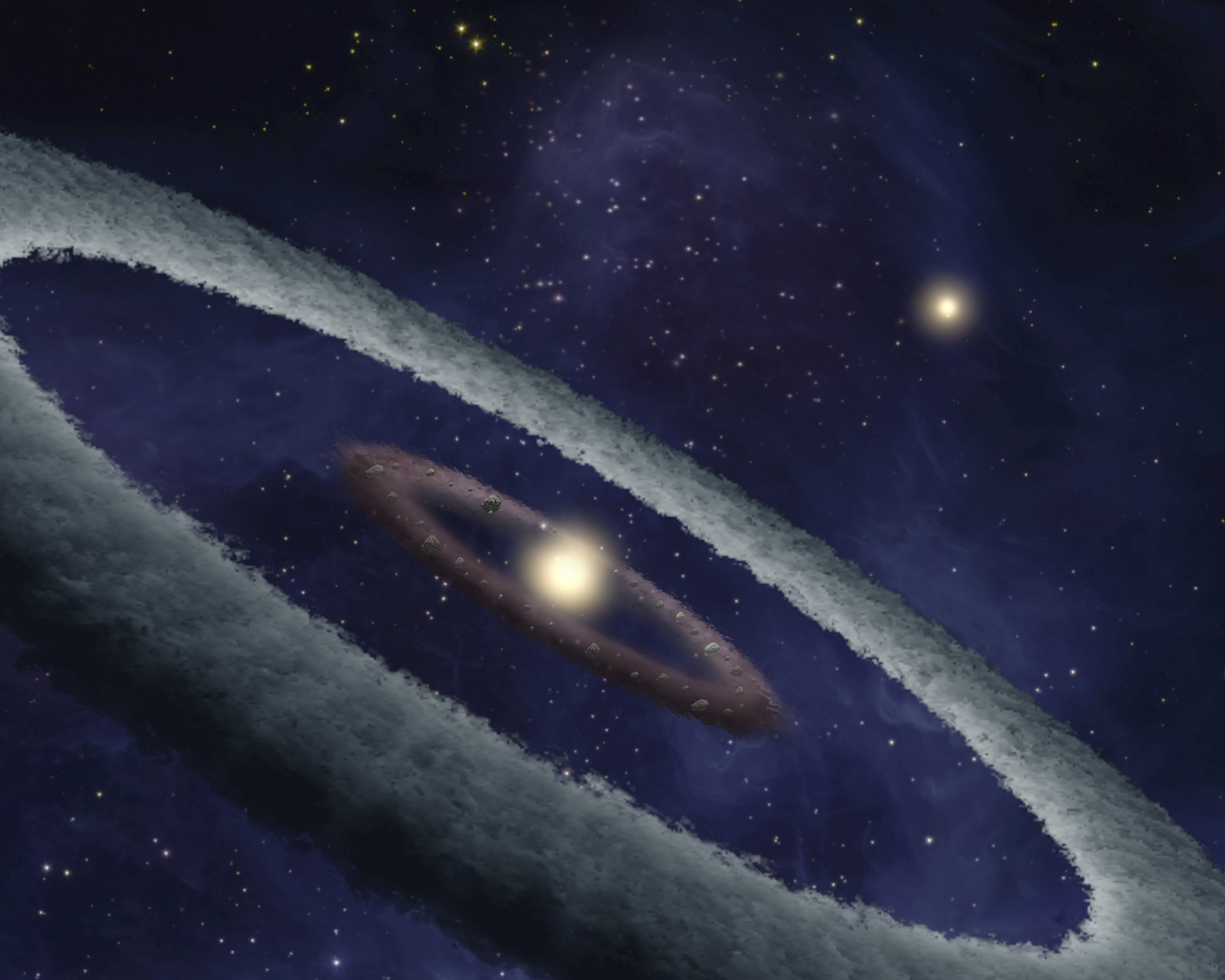
- An artists conception of the HD 113766 system showing the protoplanetary disk around HD 113766 A and its companion star HD 113766 B.

Observation data Epoch J2000.0 Equinox ICRS
- Constellation: Centaurus
- Right ascension: 13^{h} 06^{m} 35.83622^{s}
- Declination: −46° 02′ 02.0178″
- Apparent magnitude (V): 7.48

Characteristics
- Spectral type: F3 / F5V

Astrometry
Radial velocity (R_{v})	−0.6 km/s
Proper motion (μ)	RA: −34.09 mas/yr Dec.: −17.90 mas/yr
Parallax (π)	8.16±1.01 mas
Distance	approx. 400 ly (approx. 120 pc)
Absolute magnitude (M_{V})	+2.07

Details

A
Mass	1.64 M_{☉}
Radius	1.88 R_{☉}
Luminosity	4.4 L_{☉}
Surface gravity (log g)	5.18 cgs
Temperature	6,488 K
Metallicity [Fe/H]	+0.01 dex
Rotational velocity (v sin i)	93 km/s
Age	16 million years

B
Mass	1.31 M_{☉}
Radius	1.86 R_{☉}
Luminosity	2.3 L_{☉}
Surface gravity (log g)	3.80 cgs
Temperature	6,170 K
Rotational velocity (v sin i)	83 km/s

Other designations
- CD−45°8234, HD 113766, HIP 63975, SAO 223904

Database references
SIMBAD	data
- A
- B

HD 113766 is a binary star system located 424 light years from Earth in the direction of the constellation Centaurus. The star system is approximately 10 million years old and both stars are slightly more massive than the Sun. The two are separated by an angle of 1.3 arcseconds, which, at the distance of this system, corresponds to a projected separation of at least 170 AU.

What makes HD 113766 special is the presence of a large belt of warm (~440 K) dust surrounding the star HD 113766 A. The dense dust belt, more than 100 times more massive than the Solar System's asteroid belt, is thought to be collapsing to form a rocky planet, which when it has formed will lie within the star's terrestrial habitable zone where liquid water can exist on its surface. HD 113766 represents the most well understood system in a growing class of objects that should provide more clues to how rocky planets like the Earth formed.

== HD 113766 A ==
=== Rocky accretion belt ===
The dusty material in the system was analyzed in 2007 by a group led by Dr. Carey Lisse, of the Johns Hopkins University Applied Physics Laboratory in Laurel, MD, USA. Observations were made using the infrared spectrometer on board the Spitzer Space Telescope, and interpreted using the results of the NASA Deep Impact and STARDUST missions. Analysis of the atomic and mineral composition, dust temperature, and dust mass show a huge amount of warm material similar to metal rich S-type asteroids in a narrow belt at 1.8 ± 0.2 AU from the 4.4 L_{☉} HD 113766 A. The group found at least a Mars' mass worth of warm dust in particles of size 10 m or less, and very likely as much as a few Earth masses of dust if one adds in the contribution of material in bodies up to 1 km in radius which are currently thought to be the basic building blocks of rocky planet formation. Comparison with current planetary formation theories suggests that the disk is in the early stages of terrestrial (rocky) planet formation. This can be also inferred by the presence of metals in the rocky material making up the disk. If planets had already formed the high density metals should have sunk to their cores during the molten stage of planet formation; a process known as planetary differentiation.

==== Giant collision event ====
Observations with the Very Large Telescope and the Herschel Space Observatory found an inner disk within one AU and an outer disk at 9-13 AU. The inner disk contains Fe-rich crystalline olivine grains and is thought to have formed from at least one giant collision between partially differentiated bodies, seen as evidence of ongoing planet formation. Another study used Spitzer, Subaru and SOFIA to study HD 172555 and HD 113766 A. Non-periodic infrared variability was detected around HD 113766 A. The peak-to-peak amplitude was about 10-15% between 2015 and 2018. This was seen as a change in dust temperature and therefore distance from the star. It was suggested that a clump or arc of fine dust grains is in a modestly eccentric orbit (e~0.12) at 1.5 AU around the star in the terrestrial zone. This would cause dust to heat up once it is closer to the star and dust to cool down once it is further away.

=== Icy accretion belts ===
While no water gas was found to be associated with the warm dust belt, two concentrations of icy material were found in the system. The first belt lies between 4 and 9 AU, and is at the equivalent position of the solar system's asteroid belt, while the second belt is even farther out between 30 and 80 AU, where the solar system's Kuiper Belt would lie. This material may be the source of future water for the rocky planet at 1.8 AU if and when it completes its formation.

There may also be gas giant planets in this system, already formed (in the first 1-5 Myrs) before the current era of rocky planet formation. While none have been detected to date, by analogy with the Solar System, their presence is likely, since evidence for analogues of the Solar System's asteroid belt, Kuiper belt, and terrestrial planets have been found.

== HD 113766 B ==
The star system was first identified as being potentially interesting by Backman et al. using observations made by the Infrared Astronomical Satellite (IRAS) in 1983. Later measurements in 2001 by a team led by Meyer et al. determined that the system was actually a close binary, with the second star in the system, HD 113766 B, a near twin of HD 113766 A orbiting approximately 170 AU from the A star where the terrestrial planet is forming. Located at more than 4 times the distance of Pluto from the Sun, HD 113766 B has almost no effect on the material orbiting close to HD 113766 A.

== Similar star systems ==
Binary star systems are common, found more frequently than single star systems like the Sun's. The arrangement of HD 113766, a binary star system with a protoplanetary disk around one star, is somewhat similar to the one-half of the system HD 98800, which has been reported to have a large amount of warm dust mass at the equivalent distance of the Solar System's asteroid belt. It is not currently known why both of these star systems should have such configurations; i.e. a protoplanetary disk around part of the system while other stars in the system lack one.
