= 2MASS J08090250−4858172 =

Star in the cluster NGC 2547

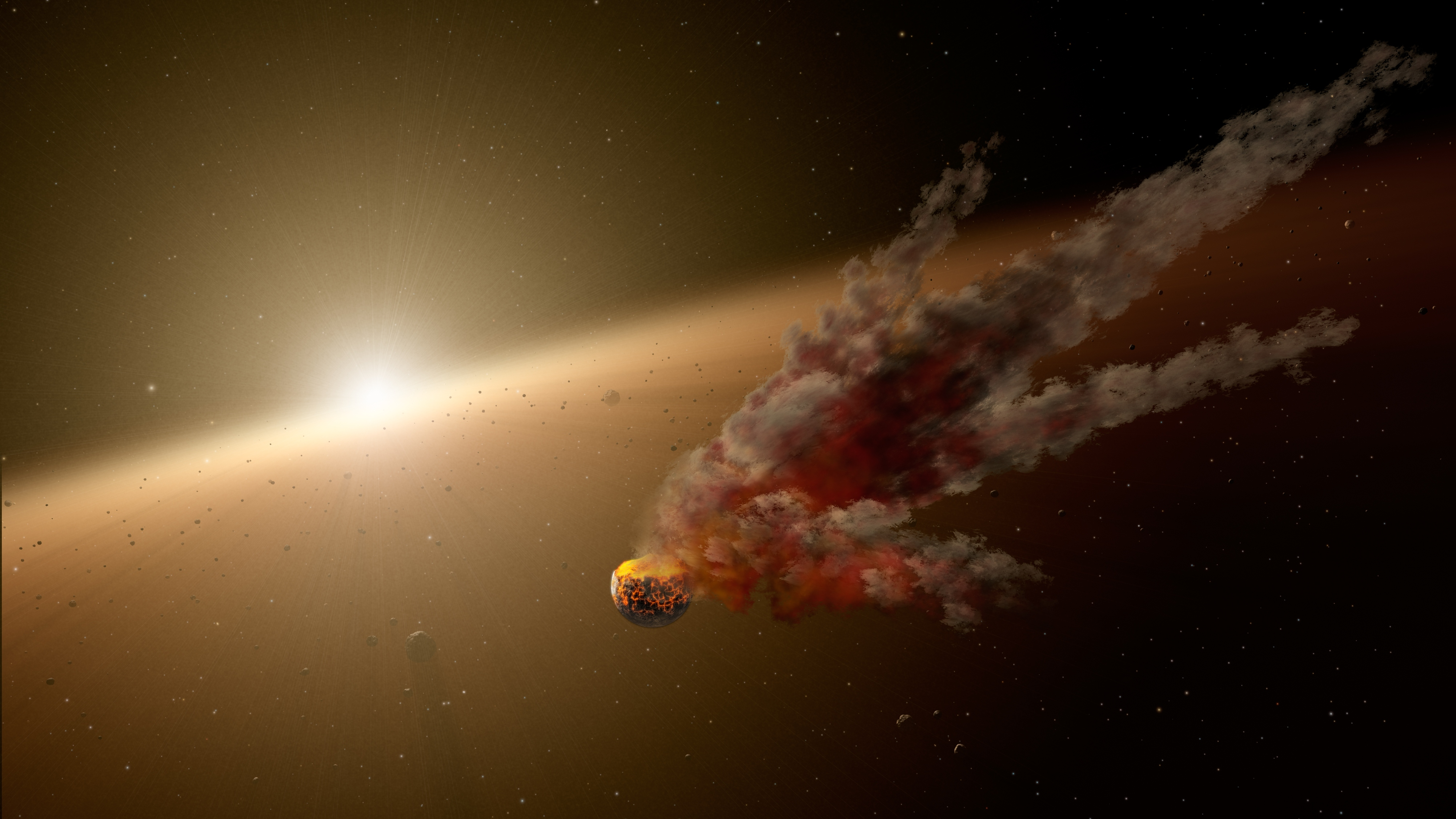
- Artist's impression of a collision occurring in ID8; Credit: NASA/JPL-Caltech

Observation data Epoch J2000 Equinox J2000
- Constellation: Vela
- Right ascension: 08^{h} 09^{m} 02.51^{s}
- Declination: −48° 58′ 17.3″
- Apparent magnitude (V): 13.13

Characteristics
- Evolutionary stage: main-sequence star
- Spectral type: G6V

Astrometry
Radial velocity (R_{v})	+22.48±1.97 km/s
Proper motion (μ)	RA: −12.003±0.017 mas/yr Dec.: +10.021±0.016 mas/yr
Parallax (π)	2.7875±0.0135 mas
Distance	1,170 ± 6 ly (359 ± 2 pc)

Details
Mass	0.9 M_{☉}
Luminosity	0.8 L_{☉}
Temperature	5,500 K
Age	35 Myr

Other designations
- Cl* NGC 2547 AR 31, DENIS J080902.5−485817, GES J08090250−4858172, TIC 238597409, UCAC2 10802763, WISEA J080902.49−485817.2, [GBR2007] ID 8, Gaia DR2 5514560780536422784

Database references
SIMBAD	data

2MASS J08090250−4858172 (also called NGC 2547–ID8) is a star in the cluster NGC 2547. In 2014 it was reported that the star had brightened in the infrared. This was interpreted as a collision between planetesimals. It is not the first time such a collision was inferred from infrared excess, with likely the first being BD+20 307, but ID8 was one of the first with the event being observed in real time. Later it became clear that two impacts occurred, one in late 2012 and another in early 2014.

In 2007 ID8 was discovered as a member of NGC 2547 and having infrared excess with Spitzer. At the time the excess was interpreted as either a transitional disk or a collision between planetesimals. In 2012 it was discovered that ID8 and HD 23514, both identified as extreme debris disks (EDD), are variable in 24 μm. EDDs are disks that are extreme bright at this wavelength and make up around 1% of all debris disks. This variation was interpreted as a possible major collision, or a few major collisions. This is opposed to debris produced in a collisional cascades in most debris disks. ID8 was variable in 24 μm between 2004 and 2007, showing both brightening and fading. Observations in 2007 with the Spitzer spectrograph showed ~98% amorphous grains and ~2% crystalline grains. The system interpreted to produce amorphous sub-micron-sized dust, originating in collisions. The similarity of the spectrum and the spectrum of BD+20 307 was noted. Follow-up observations were carried out with Spitzer IRAC (3.6 and 4.5 μm) and ground-based telescopes in 2012 and 2013. The object brightened in the infrared from 2012 to 2013. After that it decayed in brightness in 2013. At the same time the brightness remained stable in the optical. This was interpreted as a new collision between two bodies before 2013. Periodic variations in the 2013 IRAC light curve was interpreted as dust orbiting at around 0.33 astronomical units (AU).

Additional Spitzer IRAC observations showed a more complex picture. After 2013 the infrared flux increased again, until it declined rapidly in 2015. In 2016/2017 the system brightened again in the infrared, but more slowly. This was interpreted as two impacts, one in late 2012 and a second in early 2014. Short-term variations helped to determine the distance from the star for both events. The 2012 impact event occurred at 0.43 AU and involved two bodies with a size of ≥100 km. The 2014 impact event occurred at 0.24 AU, with the fragments being dominated by boulders with very little vapor condensates. As the cloud spread out, it became transparent to star light, which rapidly removed small grains from the dust cloud, explaining the sharp decline in 2015. It was suggested that the first event was a grazing or hit-and-run collision. It has been shown that fragments from such collisions return later and can impact an object a second time.

Simulations of giant impacts were done to re-create the short-term variability of ID8. As the material orbits the star it will pass through the collision point and the anticollision line. At these locations all the dust must pass through a relative narrow region, reducing the size of the dust cloud. This decreases the brightness of the dust cloud. This periodic movement into and out of these locations is what causes short-term variability. The simulations have shown that head-on collisions release material perpendicular to the impact direction and grazing impacts release material parallel to the impact direction. In between head-on and grazing, material is launched in all directions. The simulations did show that the orientation of the impact can cause the material to be spread more widely at the collision point, reducing the short-term variability.

== Gallery ==
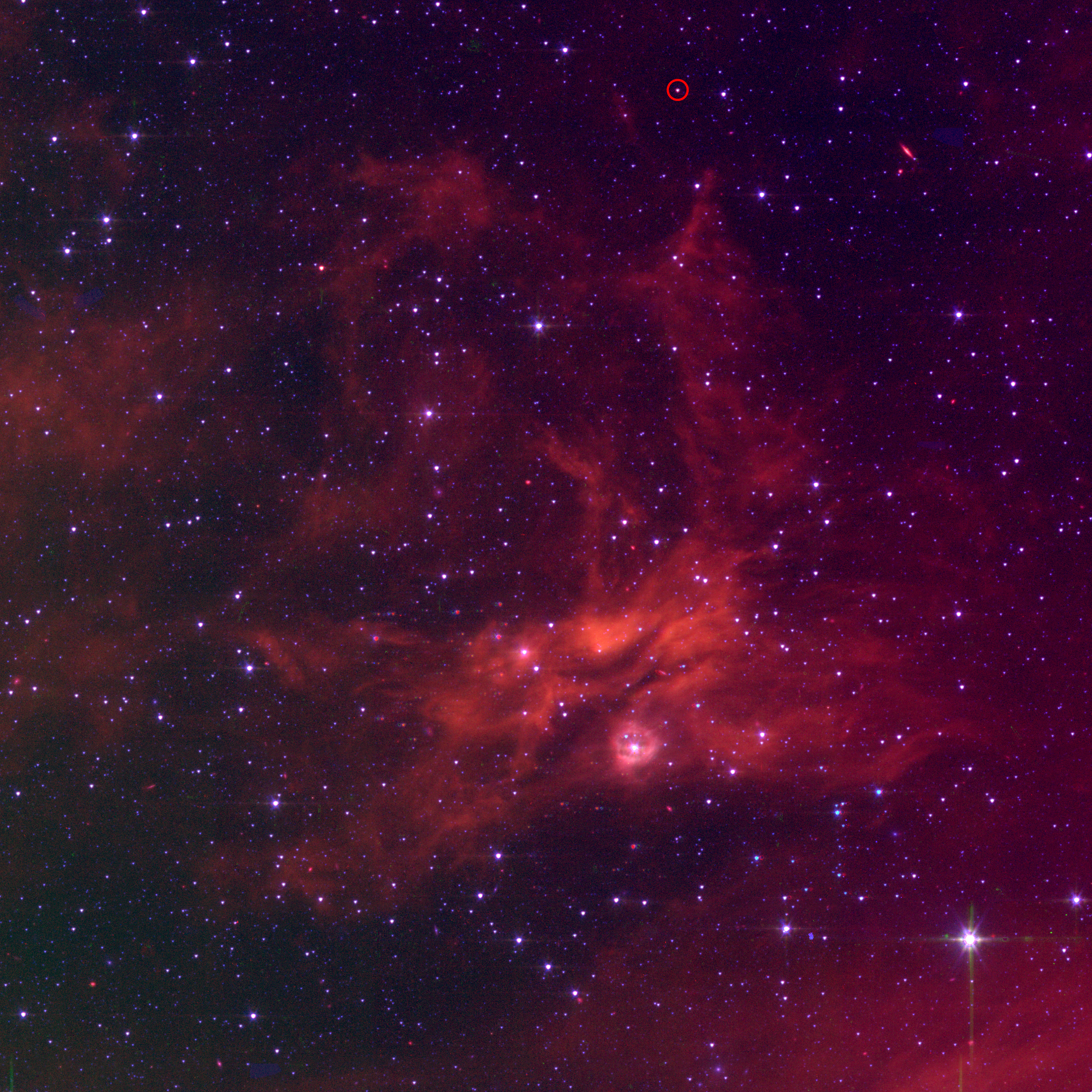
ID8 (red circle) in NGC 2547 with Spitzer IRAC

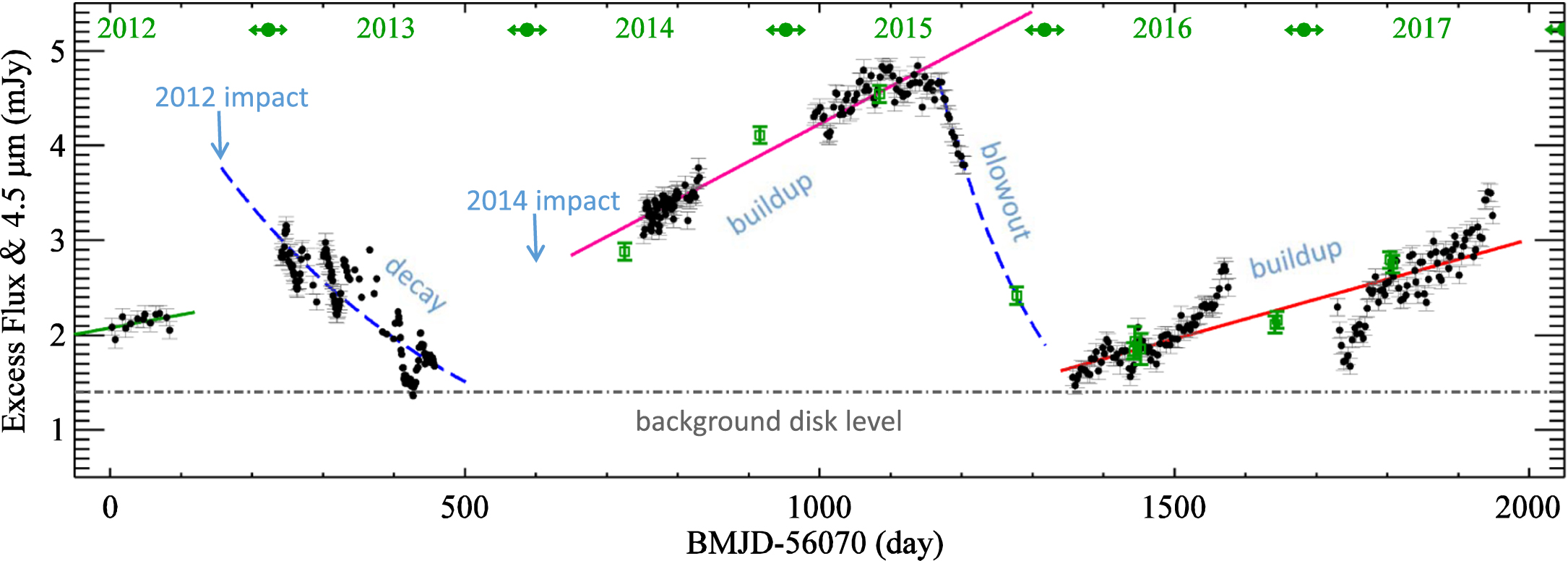
Light curve of ID8 showing both impact events in 2012 and 2014. Figure published by Su et al.

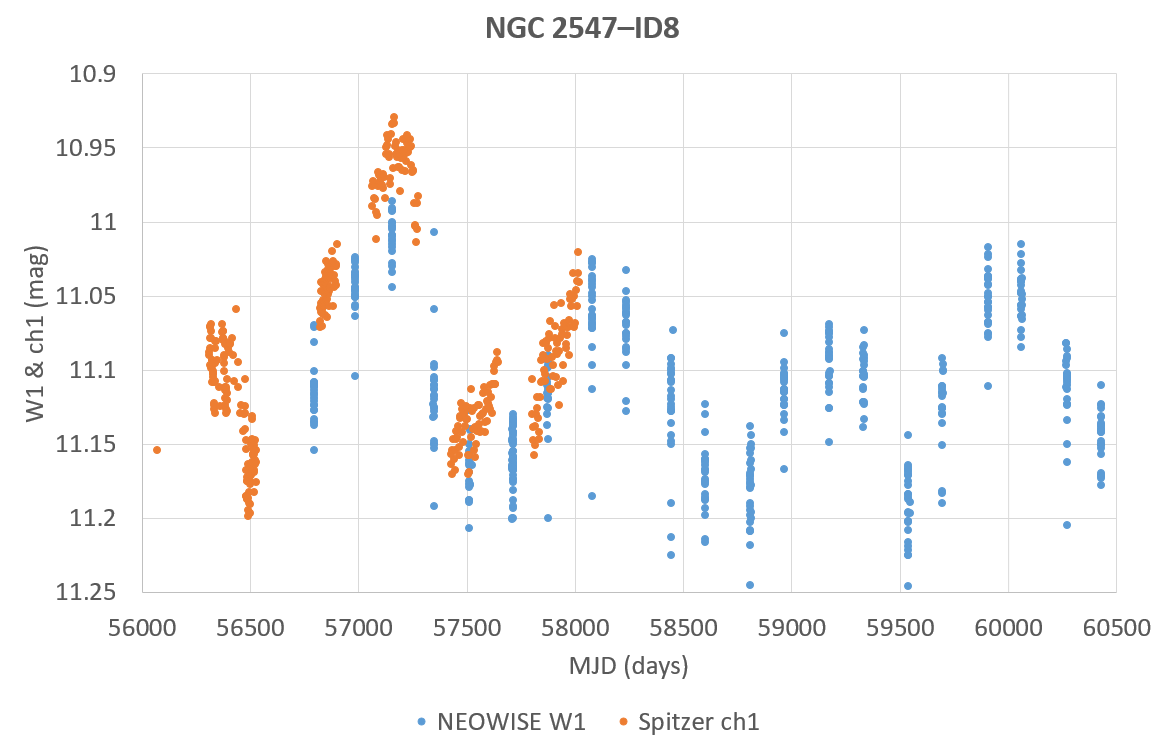
Light curve of ID with the data from Su et al. (orange) and from NEOWISE (blue). The light curve shows continued activity.

== See also ==
- List of extrasolar planetary collisions
