= BD+20°307 =

Binary star in the constellation Aries

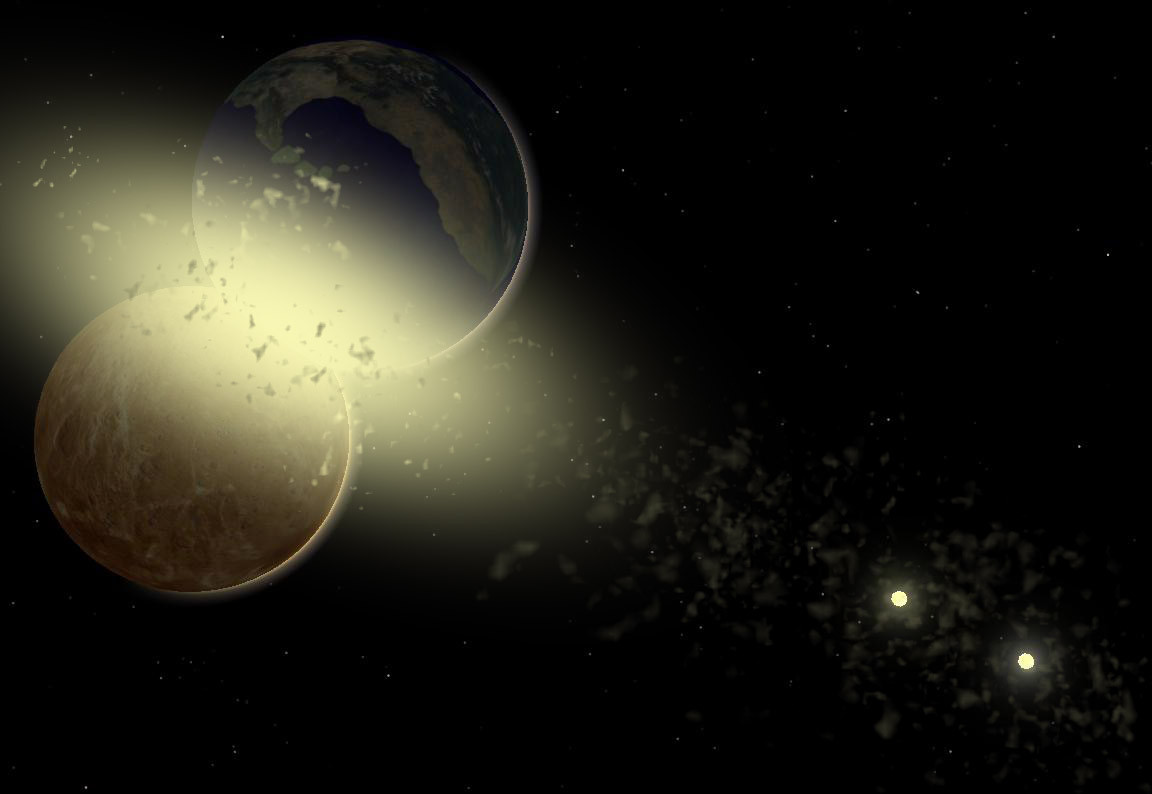
- An artist's impression of two planets colliding in the system

Observation data Epoch J2000.0 Equinox ICRS
- Constellation: Aries
- A
- Right ascension: 01^{h} 54^{m} 50.3440^{s}
- Declination: +21° 18′ 22.461″
- Apparent magnitude (V): 9.01
- B
- Right ascension: 01^{h} 54^{m} 50.7493^{s}
- Declination: +21° 18′ 16.203″
- Apparent magnitude (V): 16.45

Characteristics

A
- Spectral type: G0V
- U−B color index: +1.26
- B−V color index: +0.56

B
- Evolutionary stage: white dwarf
- Spectral type: DA

Astrometry

A
| Proper motion (μ) | RA: +38.801 mas/yr Dec.: −22.508 mas/yr |
| Parallax (π) | 8.5240±0.0189 mas |
| Distance | 382.6 ± 0.8 ly (117.3 ± 0.3 pc) |
| Absolute magnitude (M_{V}) | +4.10 |

B
| Parallax (π) | 8.4278±0.0647 mas |
| Distance | 387 ± 3 ly (118.7 ± 0.9 pc) |

Details

Aa
| Mass | 1.3±0.1 M_{☉} |
| Radius | 1.3–1.6 R_{☉} |
| Temperature | 6,500 K |
| Age | >1 Gyr |

Ab
| Mass | 1.2±0.1 M_{☉} |
| Radius | 1.3–1.6 R_{☉} |
| Temperature | 6,250 K |
| Age | >1 Gyr |

B
| Mass | 0.575 M_{☉} |
| Luminosity | 0.013 L_{☉} |
| Surface gravity (log g) | 7.93 cgs |
| Temperature | 16,594 K |

Other designations
- BD+20°307, 2MASS J01545034+2118225, TYC 1212-207-1, AG+21° 173, HIP 8920, PPM 91187, YZ 21 572, GSC 01212-00207, IRAS 01520+2103, SAO 75016.

Database references
| SIMBAD | data |
- B

BD+20°307 is a close binary star system approximately 300 light-years away in the constellation Aries. The system is surrounded by a dusty ring, and probably orbited by a 0.48 M_{☉} white dwarf on a wide (980 AU) orbit.

The dust that orbits around several hundred main-sequence stars is cold and comes from a Kuiper-belt analogous region. In the Solar System the ongoing collisions between asteroids generate a tenuous cloud of dust known as the zodiacal light. When the Solar System was young such collisions were more common and the rate of dust production was probably many times higher. Zodiacal dust around stars much younger than the Sun has been rarely found. Only a few main-sequence stars have revealed warm (>120 K) zodiacal dust.

An exceptionally large amount of warm, small, silicate dust particles around the solar-type star BD+20°307 (HIP 8920, SAO 75016) has been reported. The composition, quantity and temperature of the dust may be explained by recent, frequent or huge collisions between asteroids or other planetesimals whose orbits are being perturbed by a nearby planet.

== Spectroscopic binary ==
Both stars of the close binary are considered to be solar-type stars that are slightly more massive than the Sun. The two stars differ in effective temperature by only ~250 K and have a mass ratio of 0.91. The two orbit a common center of mass every 3.42 days. Within the spectra of the two stars the Li lines show different equivalent widths. The Li 6707 Å line though weak is detected only from the primary star, suggesting that it is older than 1 Gyr. If so, the large amount of zodiacal dust around the binary must be from a very large and recent collision of planetesimals.

== Dust cloud ==
The dust cloud orbiting BD+20°307 has about 1 million times more dust than is orbiting the Sun. Furthermore, the dust is made up of extremely tiny particles, and its temperature is over 100 K, which is unusually high. It is hypothesized that, within the past few hundred thousand years and perhaps much more recently, these particles were formed by a collision between two bodies similar to Earth. "It's as if Earth and Venus collided," said Prof. Benjamin Zuckerman, UCLA professor of physics and astronomy. "Astronomers have never seen anything like this before. Apparently, major catastrophic collisions can take place in a fully mature planetary system." This hypothesis explains why the bulk of this dust has not spiraled into BD+20°307, or been pushed out by stellar winds yet. The National Science Foundation (NSF), NASA, Tennessee State University (TSU) and the State of Tennessee funded the work by Zuckerman and his collaborators.

== Sun-like stars with hot dust ==
As of 2006 there were seven Sun-like stars that have hot dust system at semi-major axis < 10 AU. These are

Sun-like Stars with hot dust disks
| Star | Stellar classification | Distance from Earth (ly) | Constellation | Dust (or debris) temperature (K) | System | Dust (or debris) location (AU) | Cool dust > 10 AU | Stellar age (Myr) |
|---|---|---|---|---|---|---|---|---|
| Eta Corvi | F2V | 59 | Corvus | > 80 | Unary | < 3.5 | yes | 1,500 |
| HD 113766 | F3V | 424 | Centaurus | ~440 | Binary | 1.8 | yes | ~10–16 |
| BD+20°307 | G0V | ~300 | Aries | > 100 | Binary | 1 | no | > 1,000 |
| Pi^{1} Ursae Majoris | G1.5Vb | 46.5 | Ursa Major | unknown | Unary | 0.23 | yes | 400 |
| HD 12039 | G3-5V | 138 | Cetus | 110 | close stellar companion | 4–6 | no | 7.5–8 |
| HD 69830 | K0V | 40.6 | Puppis | unknown | 3 Neptune planets < 1 AU | 1 | no | 2,000–5,000 |
| HD 98800B | K5Ve | ~150 | Crater | unknown | Binary | 2.2 AU inner disk ~5.9 outer disk | no | 10 |

== See also ==
- Disrupted planet
- Eta Corvi
- HD 12039
- HD 69830
- HD 98800
- HD 113766
- List of stars that have unusual dimming periods
- List of extrasolar planetary collisions
- Pi1 Ursae Majoris
