= HD 23514 =

Star in the constellation Taurus

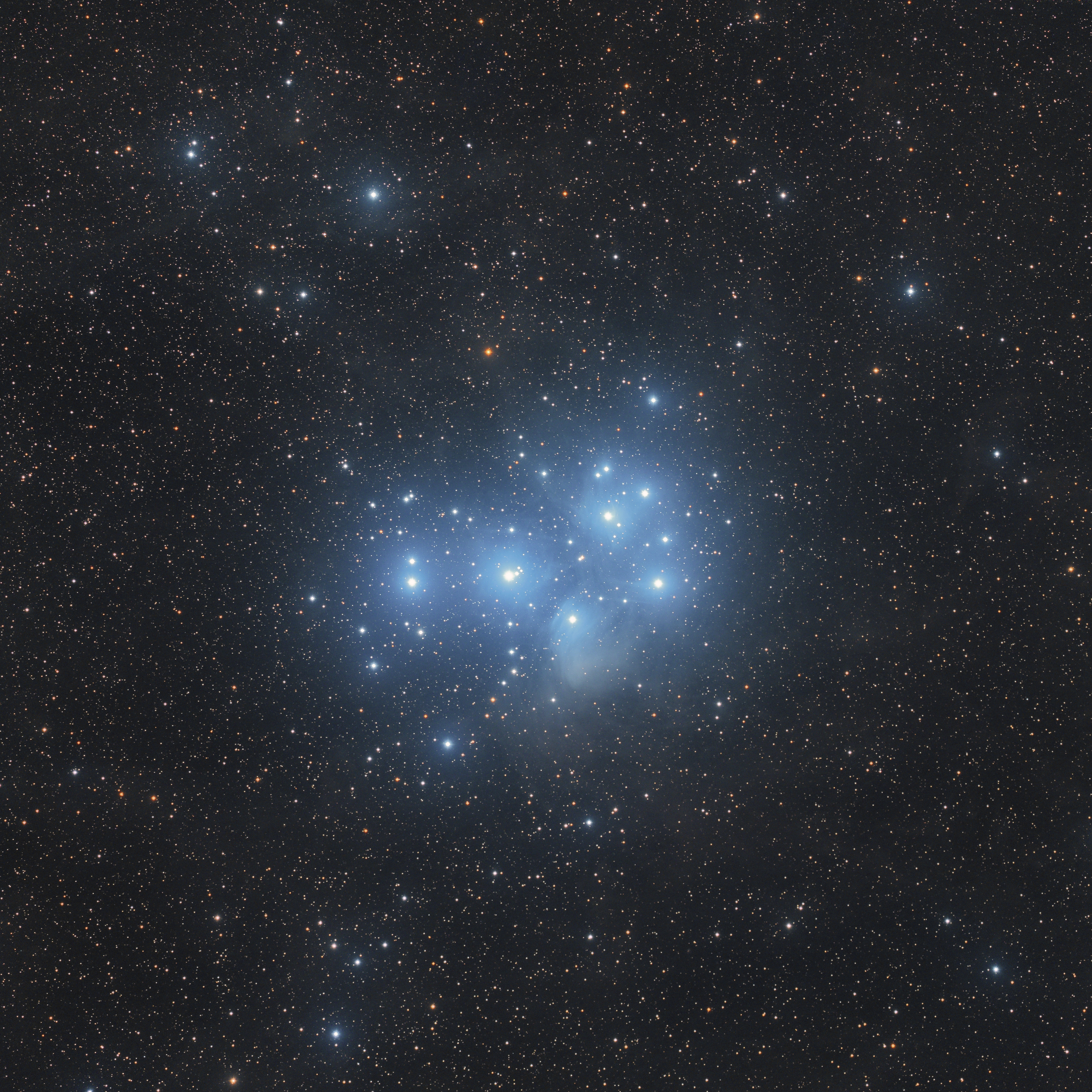
- HD 23514 in the Pleiades cluster (circled)

Observation data Epoch J2000.0 Equinox J2000.0
- Constellation: Taurus
- Right ascension: 03^{h} 46^{m} 38.3922^{s}
- Declination: +22° 55′ 11.200″
- Apparent magnitude (V): 9.42

Characteristics
- Evolutionary stage: main sequence
- Spectral type: F5V + M8
- U−B color index: 0.03
- B−V color index: 0.50

Astrometry
Radial velocity (R_{v})	6.32±0.44 km/s
Proper motion (μ)	RA: 19.924 mas/yr Dec.: -43.549 mas/yr
Parallax (π)	7.1526±0.0204 mas
Distance	456 ± 1 ly (139.8 ± 0.4 pc)

Details

HD 23514 A
Mass	1.35 M_{☉}
Radius	1.43 R_{☉}
Luminosity	2.88 L_{☉}
Surface gravity (log g)	4.20 cgs
Temperature	6400 K
Metallicity [Fe/H]	+0.03 dex
Rotation	1.496 days
Age	120±10 Myr

HD 23514 B
Mass	0.06±0.01 M_{☉}
Temperature	2600±100 K

Other designations
- BD+22 550, HD 23514, SAO 76178, EPIC 210996505, TYC 1800-1574-1

Database references
SIMBAD	data

HD 23514 is a star in the Pleiades. It is a main-sequence star of class F5V, and has been seen to have hot dust particles surrounding it. These materials, planetesimals which orbit within a circumstellar disc, are evidence of possible planetary formation. The debris disk shows evidence of being rich in silica.

The star system itself is very young, in the 35~100 million years range, meaning that it is very well likely at the stage of forming planets.

HD 23514 has a brown dwarf companion (HD 23514 B) estimated to have a mass of about 0.06±0.01 M_{☉} and a temperature of 2,600±100 K and separated by about 360 AU from the primary. The spectra of HD 23514 B have been found to have features typical of late-M dwarfs, including FeH absorption, strong CO bands and Na I absorption, and a near-infrared spectral type of M8±1 has been proposed.

In 2008 a strong silicate feature was detected in mid-infrared around the star. This was interpreted as the catastrophic collision between planetary embryos. Later observations with JWST MIRI and archived Spitzer observations found 15 year long presence of silicate emission and carbon dioxide emission. The dust was found to have a small grain size and to be 40% crystalline, which is unusually high when compared to protoplanetary disks. The crystalline dust is composed mostly of pyroxene and silica with little of olivine type. These results suggest thermal processing, favouring a giant impact. The JWST spectrum also shows the volatiles carbon monoxide and traces of water gas and ammonia. The researchers concluded that a past giant impact event can explain the detected volatiles. At least one object must have volatile content similar to carbonaceous chondritic material. Alternatively the volatiles can be explained by an atmospheric stripping event.
