= Chamaeleon Cloud =

Star forming region in the constellation Chamaleon

Nebula
- Star-forming region
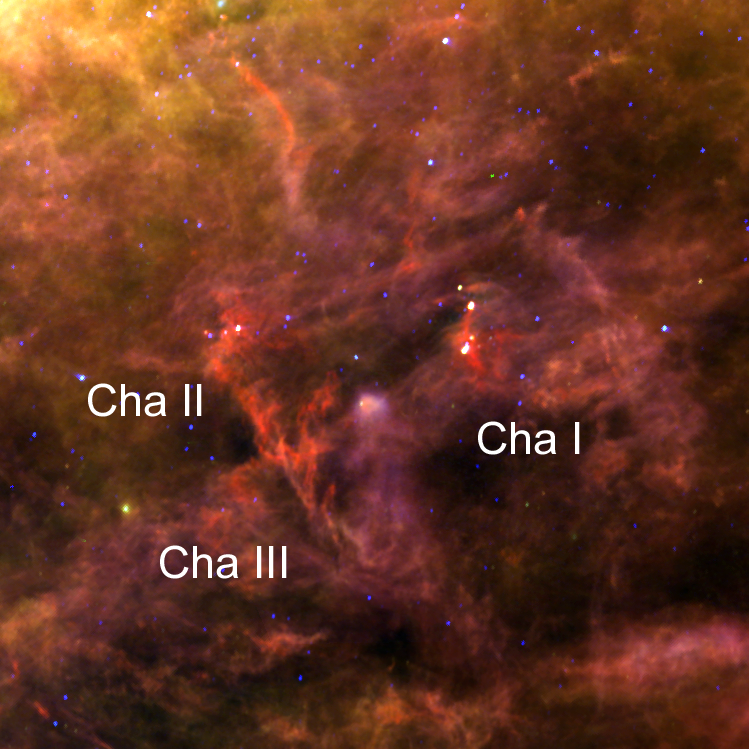
- IRAS image of Chamaeleon I, II and III. The Dark Doodad Nebula is the red filament at the top

Observation data: J2000 epoch
- Right ascension: 11^{h} 54^{m} 60.00^{s}
- Declination: −78° 00′ 0.0″
- Distance: 590-650 ly
- Constellation: Chamaeleon
- Notable features: Associated with Scorpius–Centaurus association
- Designations: Chamaeleon Molecular Cloud Complex, Chamaeleon Region

Chamaeleon Cloud (also known as Chamaeleon Complex) is a large star forming region (SFR) at the surface of the Local Bubble that includes the Chamaeleon I, Chamaeleon II, and Chamaeleon III dark clouds. It occupies nearly all of the constellation Chamaeleon and overlaps into Apus, Musca, Carina and Octans. The mean density of X-ray sources is about one source per square degree.

== Chamaeleon I dark cloud ==
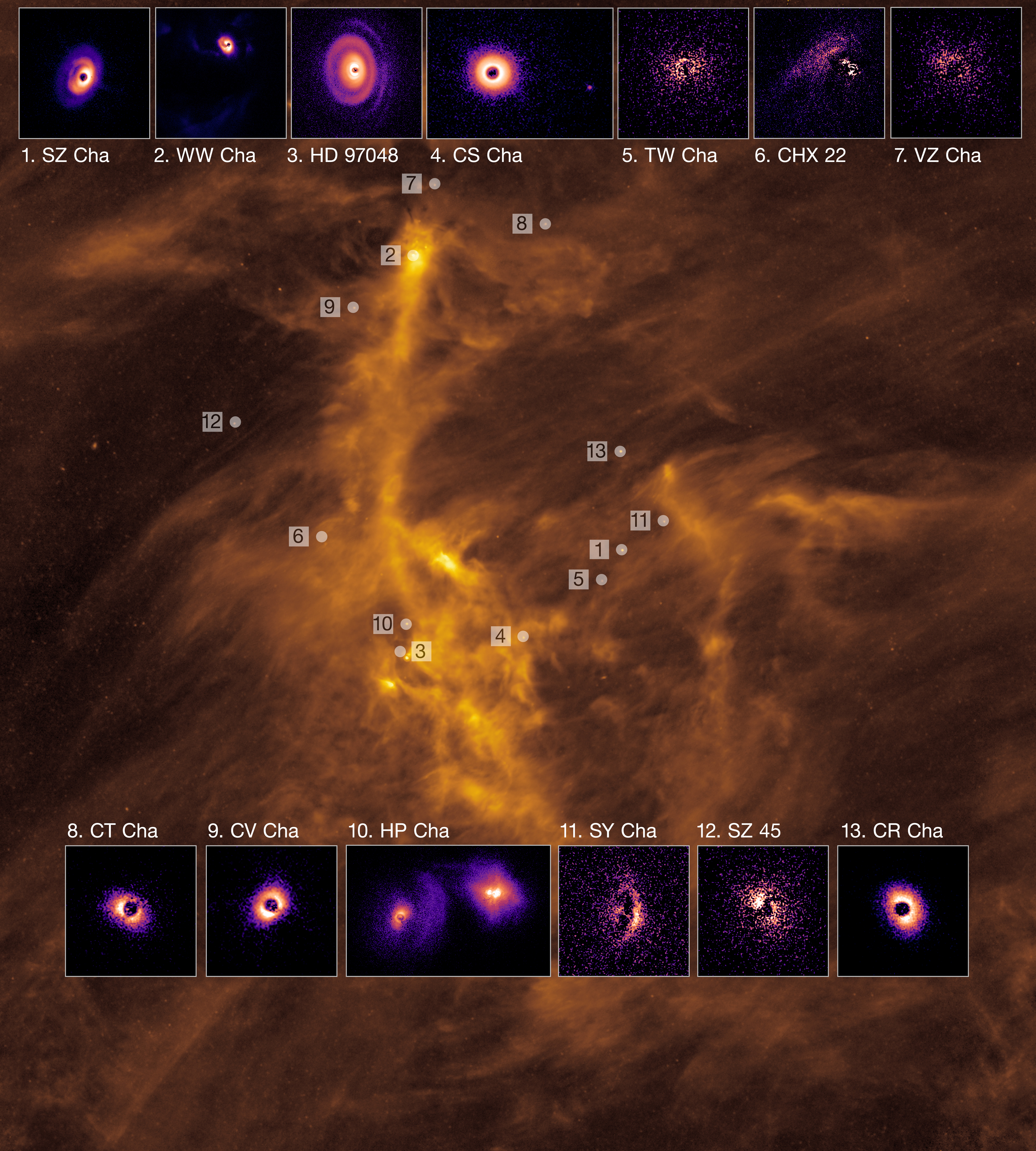
Chamaeleon I with Herschel, showing protoplanetary disks imaged with SPHERE.

The Chamaeleon I (Cha I) cloud is one of the nearest active star formation regions to Earth, with an estimated median distance of 190 parsecs (620 light-years) according to 2018 parallax measurements by the Gaia satellite. It is relatively isolated from other star-forming clouds, so it is unlikely that older pre-main sequence (PMS) stars have drifted into the field. The total stellar population is 200–300. The Cha I cloud is further divided into the North cloud or region, and the South cloud or main cloud. According to 2018 parallax measurements by the Gaia satellite, the North cloud's distance from Earth is 192.7 ± 0.4 pc (628.5 ± 1.3 ly) whereas the South cloud's distance is 186.5 ± 0.7 pc (608.3 ± 2.3 ly). Star-formation began 3-4 Myrs in the southern region and 5-6 Myr ago in the northern region. The stars have a median age of 1-2 Myr.

HD 97300 emits X-rays, illuminates the reflection nebula IC 2631 and is one of the highest mass members of the Cha I cloud, spectral type B9V, a Herbig Ae/Be star without emission lines.

Cha Hα 1 is an object of spectral type M8 in the Chamaeleon I dark cloud that was determined in 1998 to be an X-ray source and as such is the first X-ray emitting brown dwarf found.

There are some seventy to ninety X-ray sources in the Chamaeleon I star forming region. The Uhuru X-ray source (4U 1119–77) is within the Chamaeleon I cloud. This source region within the Chamaeleon I dark cloud was observed by ROSAT on February 9 at 22:14:47 UTC to February 18, 1991, 17:59:12 UTC, and on March 6, 1991, from 09:12:19 to 13:05:13 UTC. This cloud contains both "weak" T Tauri (WTT) stars and "classical" T Tauri (CTT) stars. Chamaeleon I X-ray ROSAT source 66 is at RA 11^{h} 17^{m} 36.4-37.9^{s} Dec -77° 04' 27-50", is a CTT, Chamaeleon I No. T56, aka CTT star HM 32.

The Chamaeleon I dark cloud was observed with the Imaging Proportional Counter (IPC) on board the Einstein Observatory for 2.5 h on January 23–24, 1981, identifying some 22 X-ray sources. None of these sources was closer than 8' to 4U 1119–77.

A survey of stars in Chamaeleon I with VLT/SPHERE showed that 13 out of 20 systems showed a protoplanetary disk in polarized scattered light. Systems such as HD 97048, SZ Chamaeleontis, and the WW Chamaeleontis showed morphological structures. HD 97048 also shows a kink in its carbon monoxide gas disk structure, which was interpreted with the presence of a protoplanet inside around the star and inside the disk. Another notable member of Chamaeleon I is OTS 44, which is a planetary-mass object surrounded by a disk. Other notable objects are Cha J11110675-7636030, which has a mass of 3-6 M_{J} and might be surrounded by a protoplanetary disk, and Cha 1107−7626 (6-10 M_{J}), which also is surrounded by a disk.

== Chamaeleon II dark cloud ==
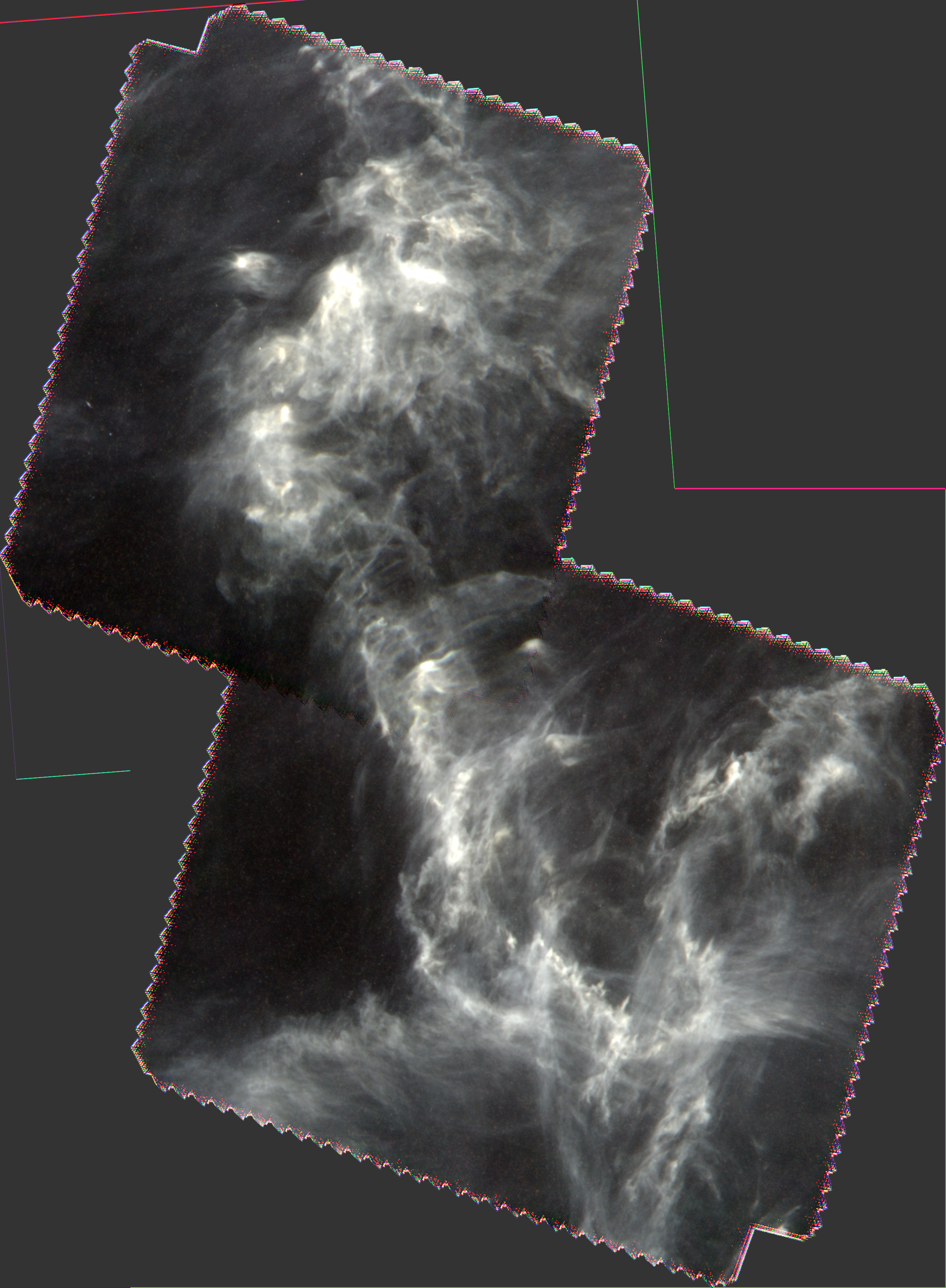
Chamaeleon II and III with Herschel

Chamaeleon II is 181+6
−5 pc (590+20
−16 ly) away from Earth, according to 2018 parallax measurements by the Gaia satellite. Chamaeleon II contains the Uhuru source 4U 1302–77. It is close to RXJ 1303.1-7706 at RA 13^{h} 03^{m} 04.70^{s} Dec -77° 06' 55.0", a K7-M0 new WTT. The Chamaeleon II dark cloud contains some 40 X-ray sources. Observation in Chamaeleon II was carried out from September 10 to 17, 1993. Source RXJ 1301.9-7706, a new WTTS candidate of spectral type K1, is closest to 4U 1302–77. Stars in Chamaeleon II have a mean age of 2-6 Myr. This age was later revised to 1-2 Myr. Cha II stars have a larger disk fraction than Cha I in this study. A study with ALMA detected 22 disks around stars in Cha II in continuum. There are also candidate planetary-mass objects in Cha II that are surrounded by disks.

== Chamaeleon III dark cloud ==
Chamaeleon II is 199+8
−7 pc (649+26
−23 ly) away from Earth, according to 2018 parallax measurements by the Gaia satellite. According to a 1998 study led by Shigeo Yamauchi, "Chamaeleon III appears to be devoid of current star-formation activity." There are two particularly prominent nebulae associated with this area. The smaller is commonly known as the Thumbprint Nebula and the larger The Talon Nebula.

== Extended definition ==
The cloud is sometimes extended with an eastern part, and together with the distinctively long Dark Doodad Nebula (or Musca nebula) to the north the complex is called the Musca-Chamaeleonis Molecular Cloud.

Two foreground associations are found near the Chamaeleon dark clouds. These are named after ε Chamaeleontis (3-5 Myr, distance 110 parsec) and η Chamaeleontis (4-8 Myr, distance 97 parsec). The proper motion of these associations are distinct from Chamaeleon I and II, but it is unclear whether the associations are physically connected to the dark clouds. One notable member of the ε Chamaeleontis association is WISEA J120037.79-784508.3, which is one of the closest brown dwarfs that is surrounded by a disk.

== Gallery ==
Middle and south of Cha I in visible light with the Víctor M. Blanco telescope. This view does not contain the northern part of Cha I.

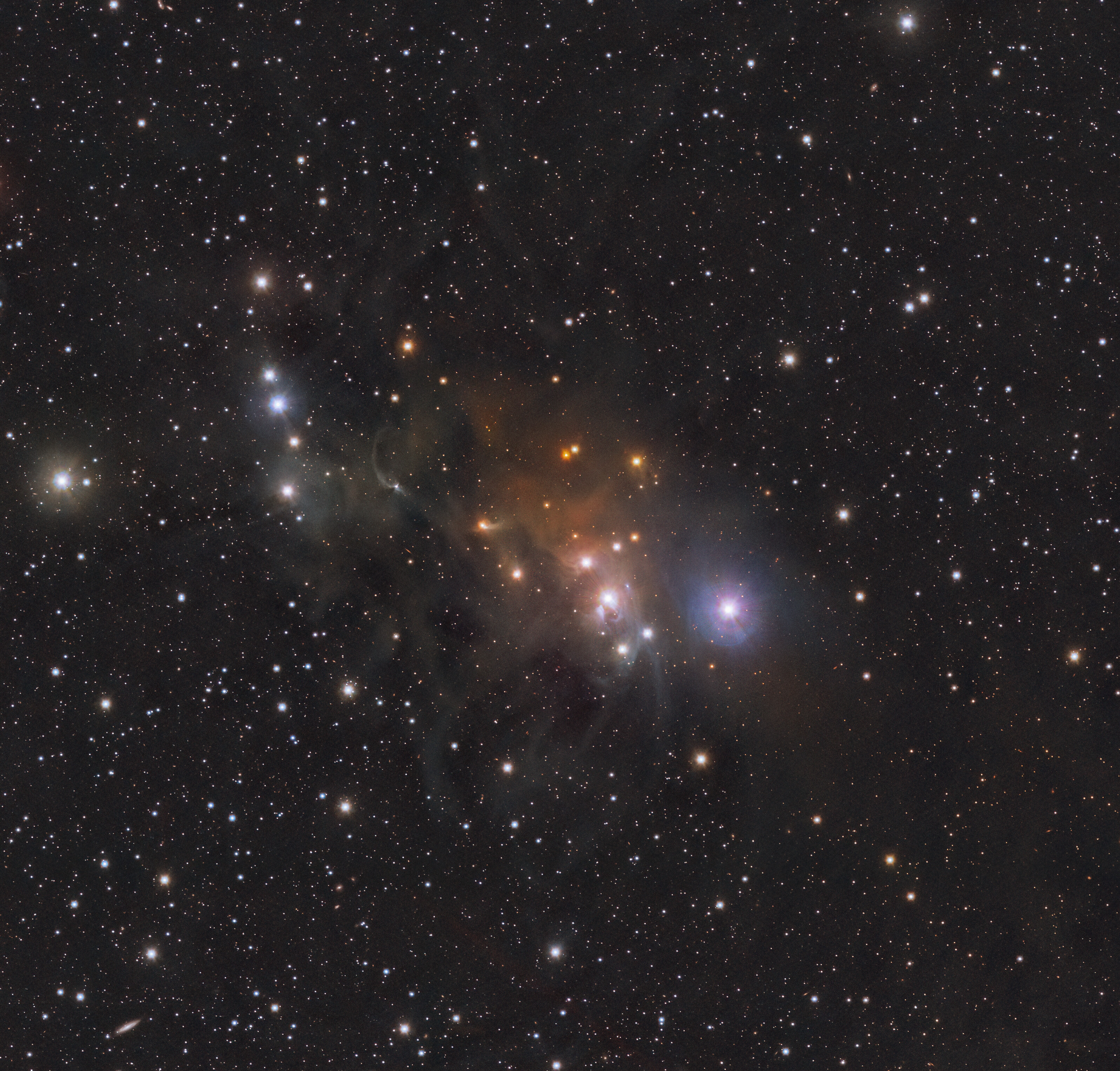
Infrared view (VIRCam) of the north of Cha I (reflection nebula IC 2631)

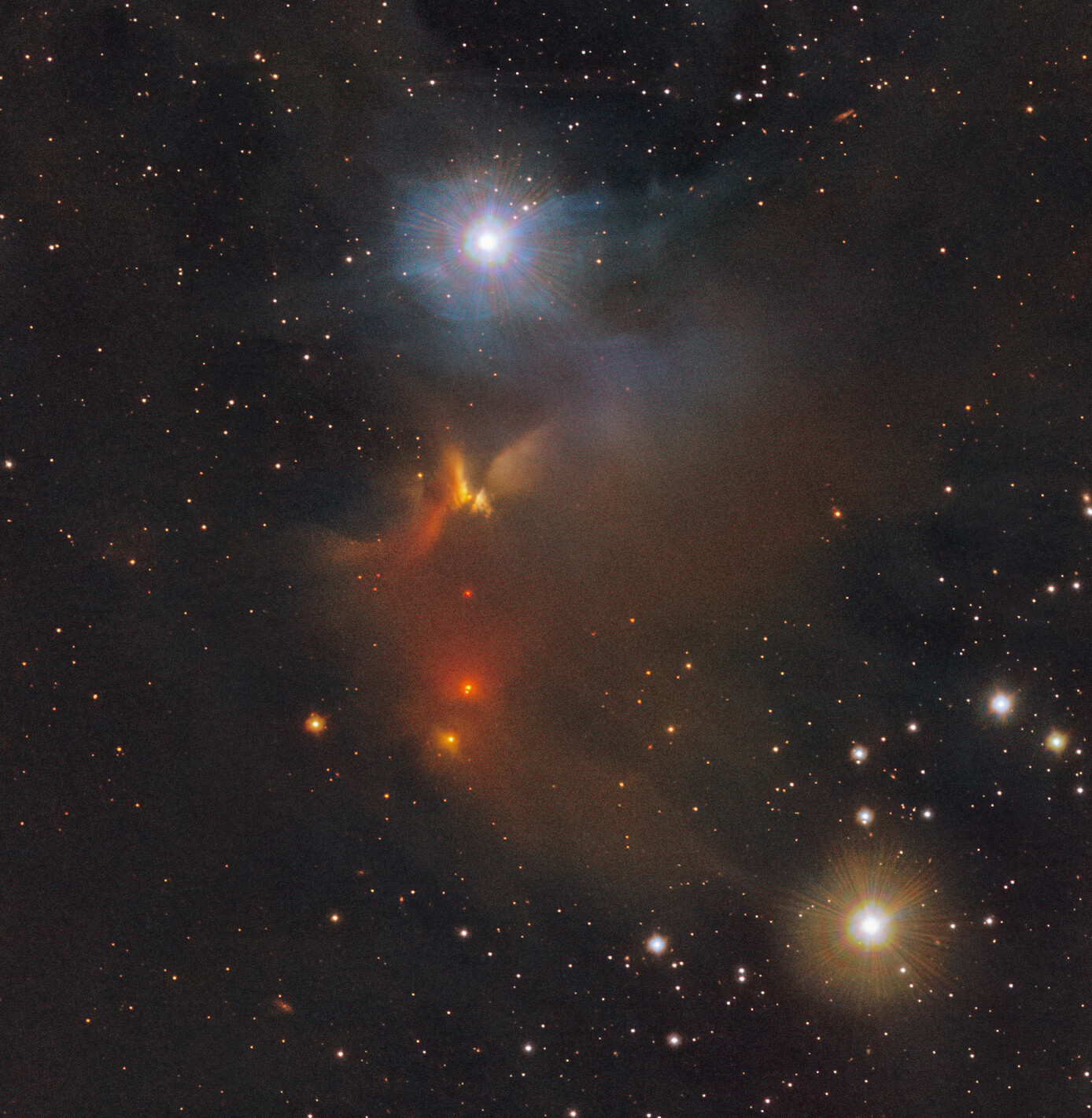
Infrared view (VIRCam) of the middle of Cha I, with Ass Cha T 2-21 (top) and Ced 110 IRS 4 (middle)

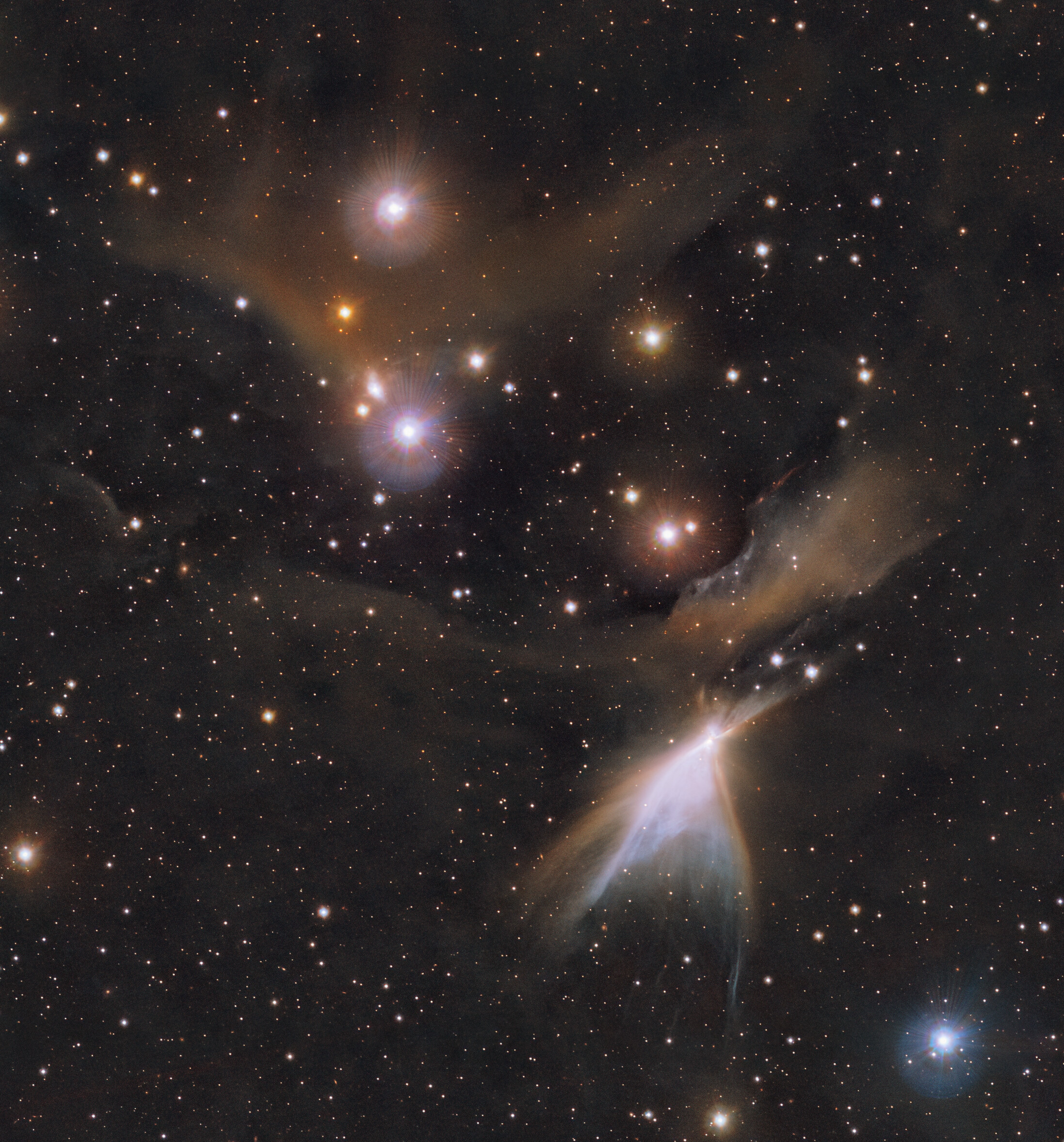
Infrared view (VIRCam) of the south of Cha I, including HD 97048, DI Chamaeleontis (both at the upper left) and Cha IRN (bright nebula at the lower right)

Another view of the south of Cha I, this time with Hubble

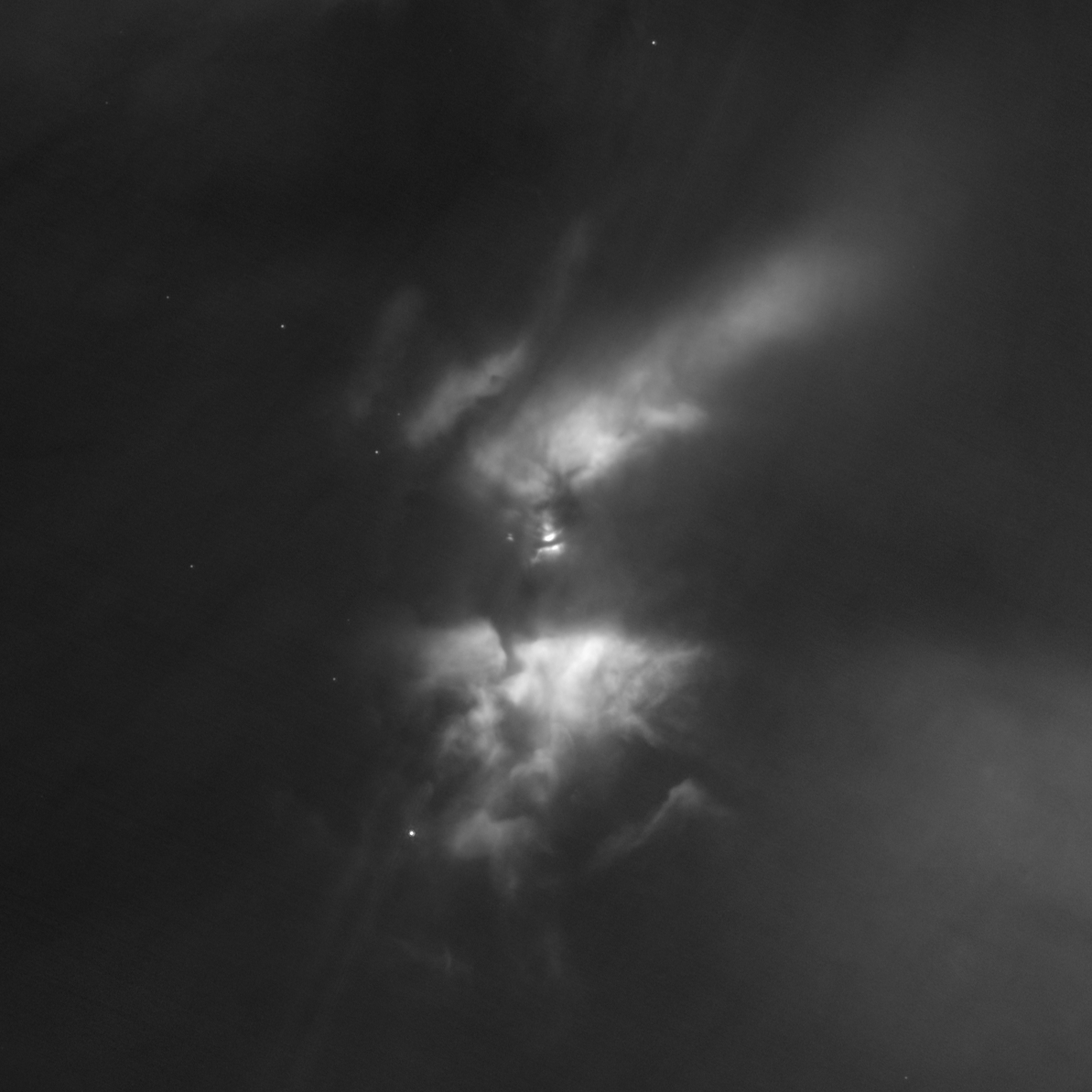
Detailed view of the two disks of Ced 110 IRS4 (center) and the surrounding nebula with JWST

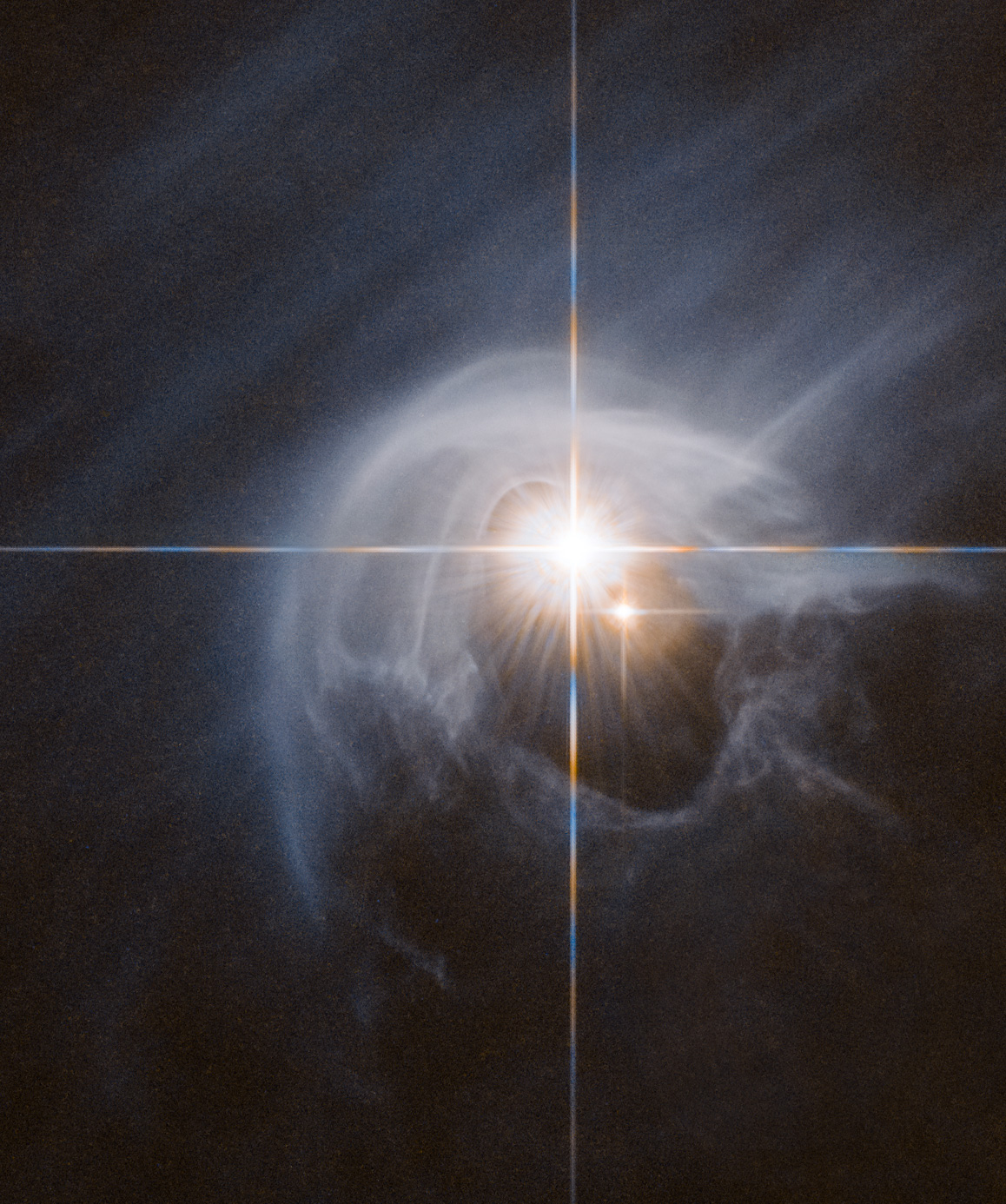
DI Chamaeleontis nebula in detail with Hubble

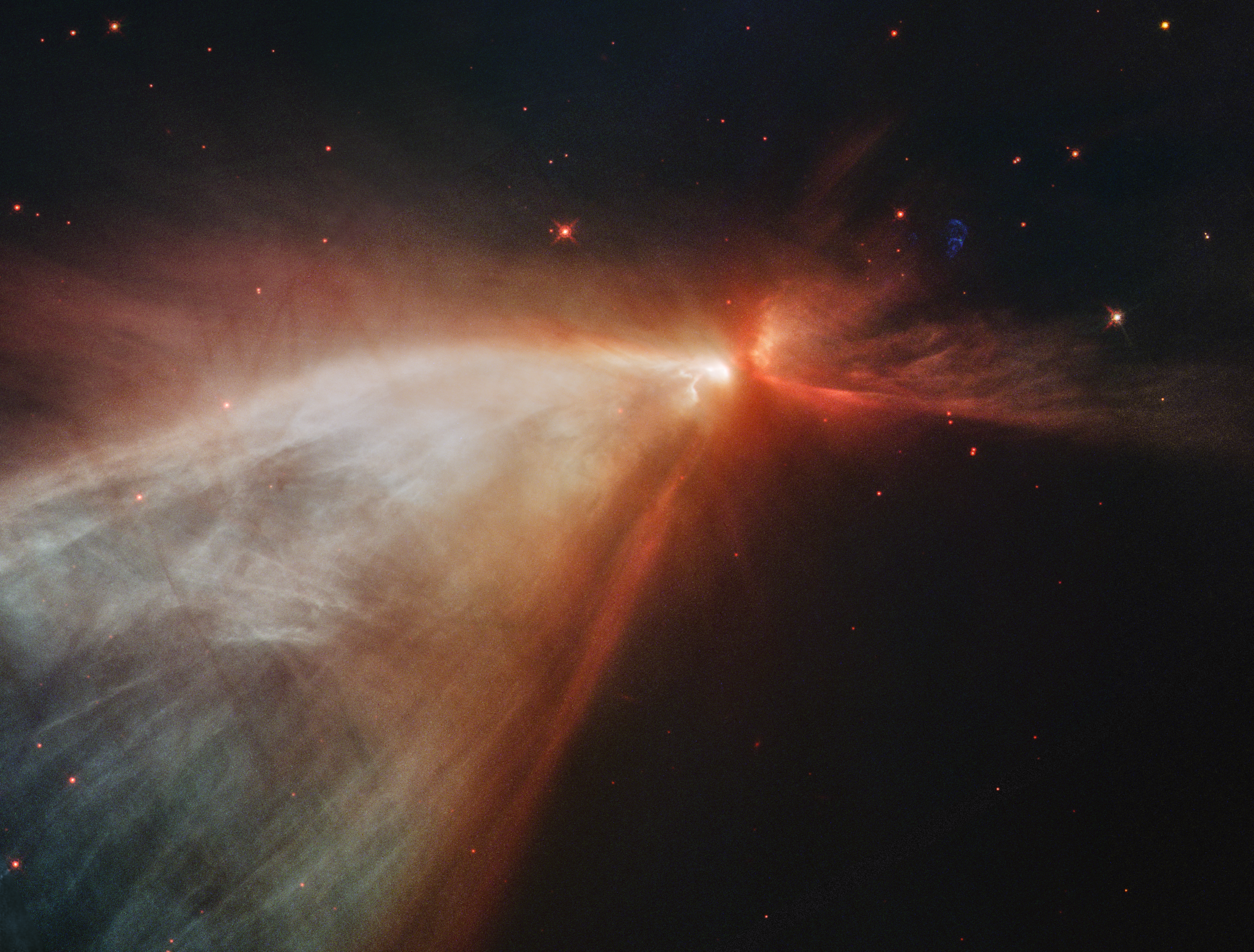
Detail of the young star Cha IRN with HH909A, with Hubble

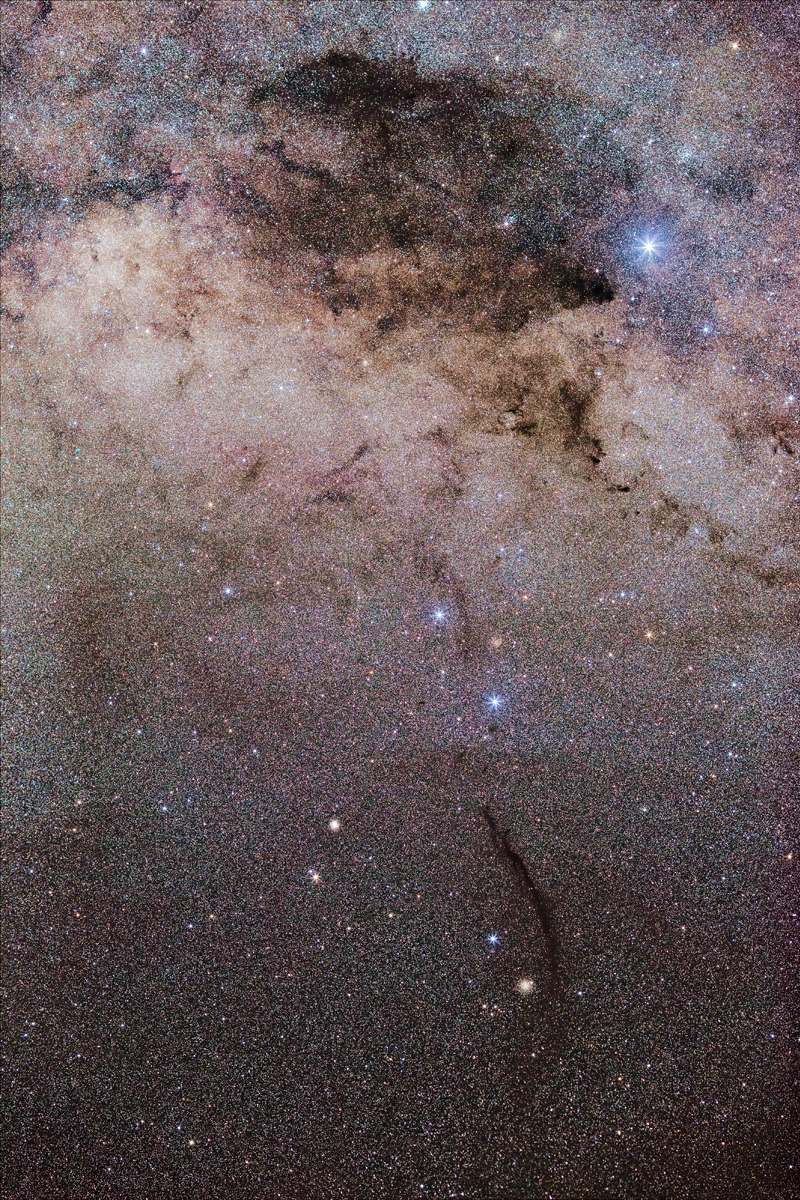
The distinctively thin Doodad Nebula can be seen south of the large Coalsack Nebula at the top.

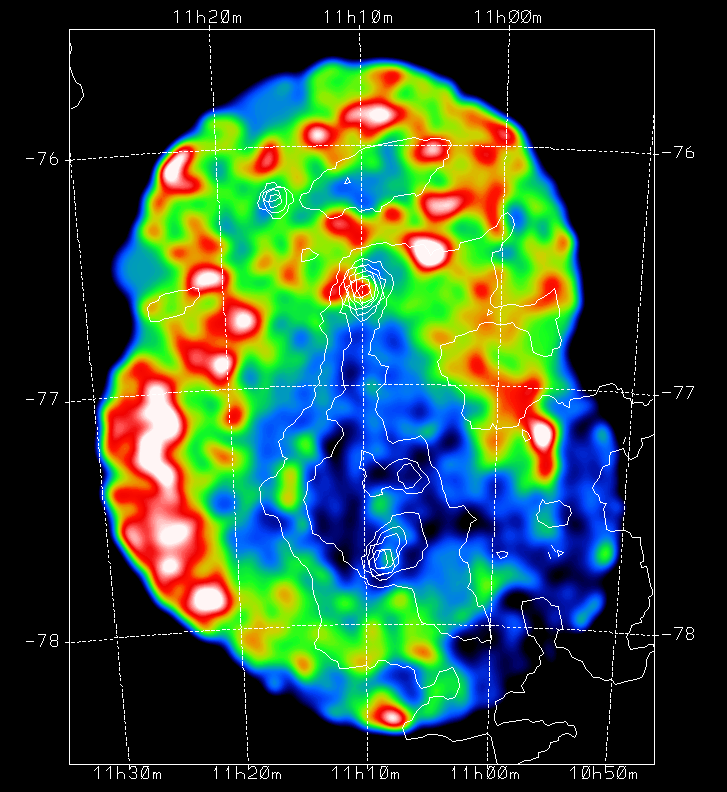
This is a ROSAT false-color image in X-rays between 500 eV and 1.1 keV of the Chamaeleon I dark cloud. The contours are 100 μm emission from dust measured by the IRAS satellite.

== See also ==
- Corona Australis Molecular Cloud
- List of nearby stellar associations and moving groups
