= WISPIT 2 =

Binary star in the constellation Aquila

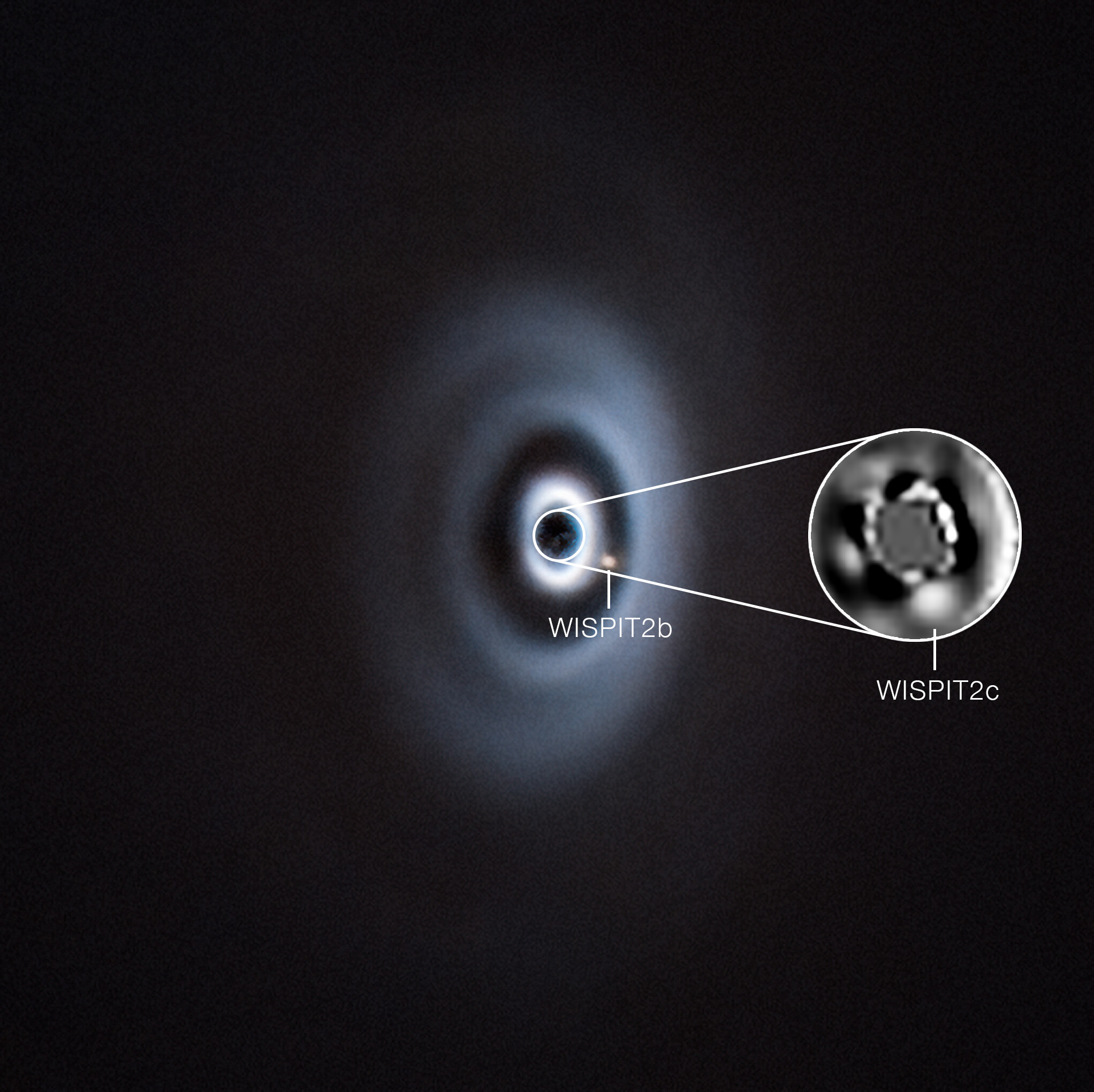
- The disk around WISPIT 2 with VLT SPHERE. The protoplanet WISPIT 2b is inside the gap of the disk on the lower right while zoomed in, another protoplanet WISPIT 2c is inside of the inner disk Credit: ESO/R. F. van Capelleveen et al.

Observation data Epoch J2000 Equinox J2000
- Constellation: Aquila
- Right ascension: 19^{h} 23^{m} 17.03^{s}
- Declination: −07° 40′ 55.1″
- Apparent magnitude (V): 11.60±0.12

Characteristics
- Evolutionary stage: pre-main-sequence
- Variable type: T Tau

Astrometry
Radial velocity (R_{v})	+5.81±0.01 km/s
Proper motion (μ)	RA: +6.308±0.024 mas/yr Dec.: −27.138±0.018 mas/yr
Parallax (π)	7.4649±0.0214 mas
Distance	437 ± 1 ly (134.0 ± 0.4 pc)

Orbit
Period (P)	4.8026±0.0001 days
Semi-major axis (a)	0.0608–0.6210 au (13.07–13.37 R_{☉})
Eccentricity (e)	0.0079±0.0004
Inclination (i)	45.66°
Periastron epoch (T)	61152.723±0.022 MJD
Argument of periastron (ω) (secondary)	9.81±1.65°
Semi-amplitude (K_{1}) (primary)	26.665±0.014 km/s

Details

Primary
Mass	0.95–1.02 M_{☉}
Radius	1.418±0.004 R_{☉}
Luminosity (bolometric)	0.699±0.021 L_{☉}
Surface gravity (log g)	4.00±0.25 cgs
Temperature	4400±50 K
Rotation	4.7004 days
Age	5.1+2.4 −1.3 Myr

Secondary
Mass	0.35–0.37 M_{☉}

Other designations
- TYC 5709-354-1, IRAS 19205-0746, IRAS F19205-0746, Gaia DR2 4207586980945067648

Database references
SIMBAD	data
Exoplanet Archive	data

WISPIT 2 (also called TYC 5709-354-1) is a binary star in the constellation Aquila. It is part of the Scorpius-Centaurus OB association, likely belonging to the subgroup Theia 53. The system has a directly imaged circumstellar disk with multiple rings and two directly imaged protoplanets inside the rings' gaps. One of the protoplanets, WISPIT 2b, was also detected in H-alpha, showing that it is actively accreting gas from a surrounding circumplanetary disk. The star is named after the astronomical survey Wide Separation Planets In Time (WISPIT) in the course of which the protoplanetary system was discovered.

The binary nature of WISPIT 2 was discovered in 2026 using radial velocity data. It is a single-lined spectroscopic binary with an orbital period of 4.8026 days a semi-major axis between 0.0608 and 0.6210 au. The orbit is thought to be circular, with a very small eccentricity of 0.0079, and the inclination is assumed to be the same of the outer disk (45.66°), based on observational evidence. Based on the orbital elements and dynamical constraints on the sum of masses, the primary has a mass between 0.95 and 1.02 M_{☉}, while the mass of the secondary is between 0.35 and 0.37 M_{☉}.

== Circumstellar disk ==
The disk was classified as transitional, meaning it has an inner cavity. The disk has 4 rings and one prominent gap at 68 astronomical units (AU). The outermost ring is located at 316 AU and the disk was detected out to a distance of 2.8 arcseconds (380 AU) from the star. The inclination of the disk is around 44° to 46°.

== Planetary system ==
Observations with VLT/SPHERE, Magellan MagAO-X and LBT/LMIRcam revealed one planet located inside gap 3. The protoplanet was confirmed to move with the star and shows orbital motion in images from October 2023 to April 2025. The planet has a mass of around 5 M_{J} and is responsible for clearing a gap inside the disk. The protoplanet is also detected in H-alpha, showing that it is accreting material from a circumplanetary disk. This makes WISPIT 2b similar to the PDS 70 planets, 2MJ1612b and possibly LkCa 15b.

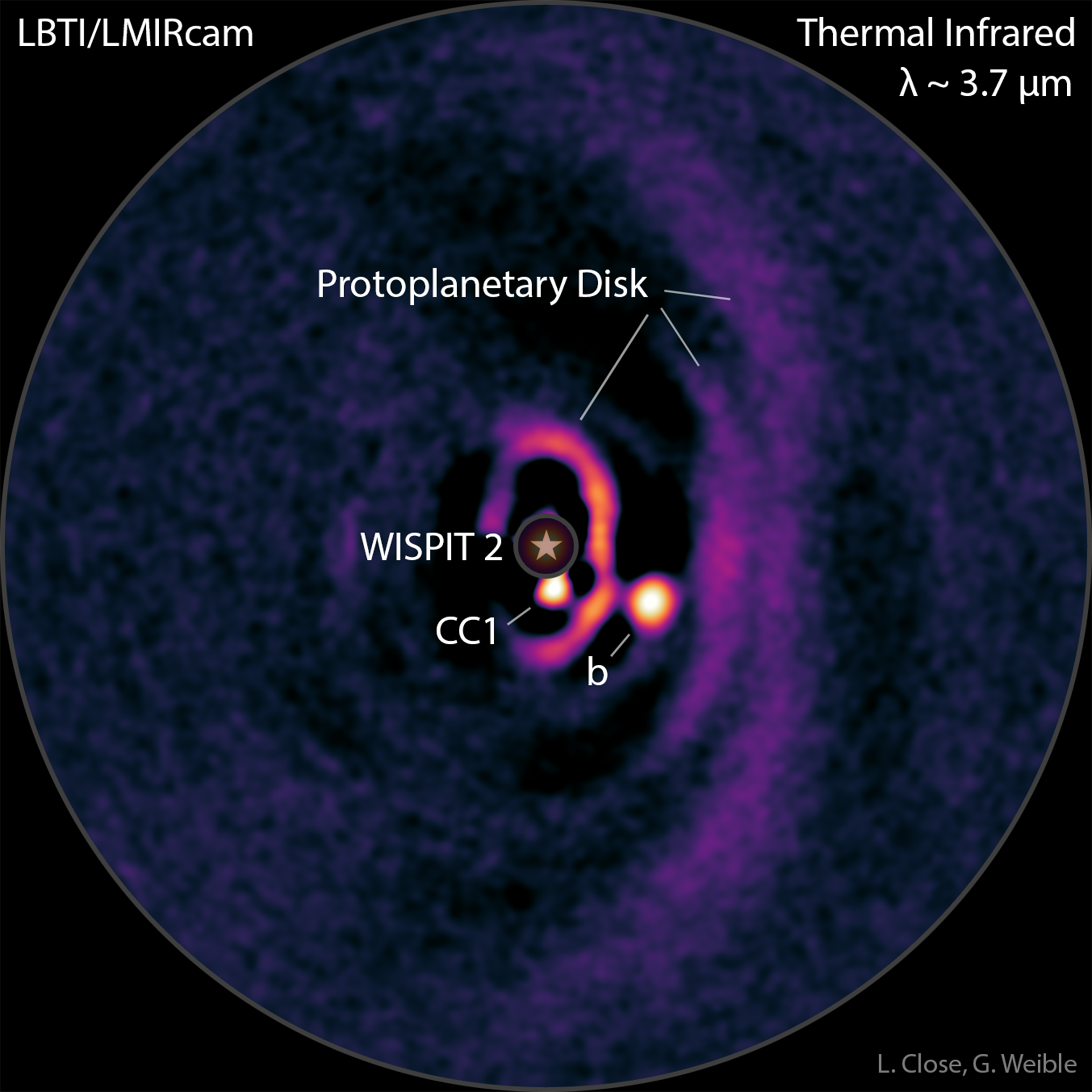
Annotated thermal-infrared image of the WISPIT 2 protoplanetary system seen with LBTI/LMIRcam. Credit: Laird Close & Gabriel Weible (University of Arizona)

One additional inner candidate planet, CC1, was detected together with WISPIT 2b, but needed further observations to determine whether it is a planet or a dust clump. Spectroscopic observations published in 2026 confirmed that CC1 is indeed a planet, now named WISPIT 2c.

The WISPIT 2 planetary system
Companion (in order from star)	Mass	Semimajor axis (AU)	Orbital period (years)	Eccentricity	Inclination (°)	Radius
c	8–12 M_{J}	15	—	—	—	1.78–2.20 R_{J}
Ring 3	38.44±0.09 AU				44.95±0.39°	—
b	5.3±1.0 M_{J}	57.5	—	—	—	1.6±0.2 R_{J}
Gap 3	69.0±0.6 AU				44.2±0.8°	—
Ring 2	96.7±0.6 AU				41.8±0.6°	—
Ring 1	163.6±2.9 AU				45.4±1.1°	—
Ring 0	316.4±4.5 AU				43.6±1.5°	—

== See also ==
- List of directly imaged exoplanets
- WISPIT 1
