= Mesoplanet =

Proposed term for planetary objects that have masses between those of Mercury and Ceres

Mesoplanets are planetary-mass objects with sizes smaller than Mercury but larger than Ceres. The term was coined by Isaac Asimov. Assuming size is defined in relation to equatorial radius, mesoplanets should be approximately 500 km to 2,500 km in radius.

== History ==
The term was coined in Asimov's essay "What's in a Name?", which first appeared in the Los Angeles Times in the late 1980s and was reprinted in his 1990 book Frontiers; the term was later revisited in his essay, "The Incredible Shrinking Planet" which appeared first in The Magazine of Fantasy and Science Fiction and then in the anthology The Relativity of Wrong (1988).

Asimov noted that the Solar System has many planetary bodies (as opposed to the Sun and natural satellites) and stated that lines dividing "major planets" from minor planets were necessarily arbitrary. Asimov then pointed out that there was a large gap in size between Mercury, the smallest planetary body that was considered to be undoubtedly a major planet, and Ceres, the largest planetary body that was considered to be undoubtedly a minor planet. Only one planetary body known at the time, Pluto, fell within the gap. Rather than arbitrarily decide whether Pluto belonged with the major planets or the minor planets, Asimov suggested that any planetary body that fell within the size gap between Mercury and Ceres be called a mesoplanet, because mesos means "middle" in Greek.

... my own suggestion is that everything from Mercury up be called a major planet; everything from Ceres down be called a minor planet; and everything between Mercury and Ceres be called a "mesoplanet" (from a Greek word for "intermediate"). At the moment, Pluto is the only mesoplanet known. — I. Asimov (1988)

Today, the known objects that would be included by this definition are Pluto, Eris, Haumea, Makemake, Gonggong, Quaoar, probably Sedna, and perhaps Orcus. These eight, together with Ceres, are the objects astronomers generally agree are dwarf planets (though with some doubt regarding Orcus).

== See also ==
- Asteroid
- Centaur (minor planet)
- Fusor (astronomy)
- Protoplanet
- Planetesimal
- Brown dwarf
