= IM Lupi =

Pre-main-sequence star in the constellation Lupus

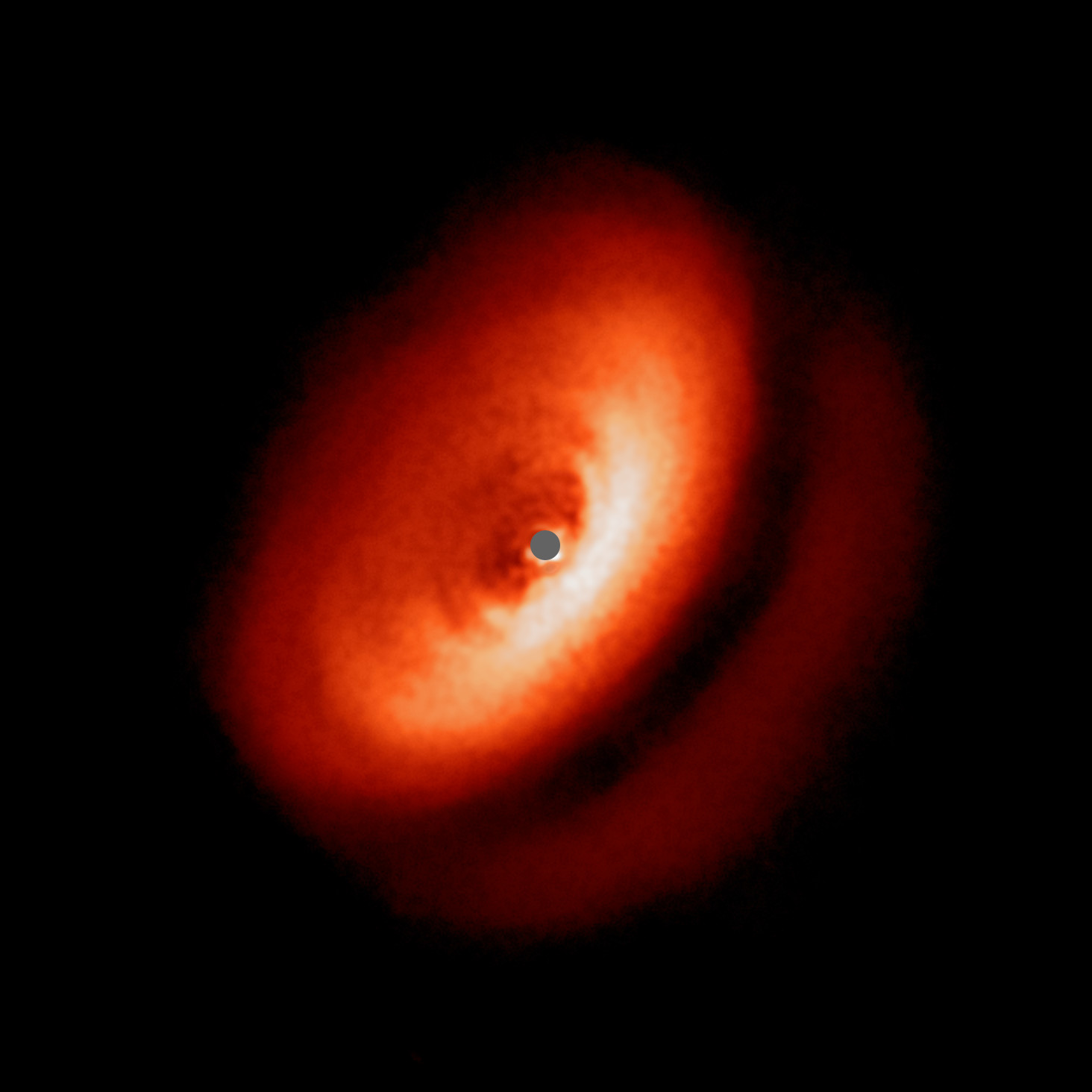
- VLT/SPHERE scattered light image of the disk around IM Lupi. The gray circle shows the position of the star. Credit: ESO/H. Avenhaus et al./DARTT-S collaboration

Observation data Epoch J2000 Equinox J2000
- Constellation: Lupus
- Right ascension: 15^{h} 56^{m} 09.2067^{s}
- Declination: −37° 56′ 06.1261″
- Apparent magnitude (V): 11.93

Characteristics
- Evolutionary stage: Young Stellar Object
- Spectral type: M0
- Variable type: Orion variable of T Tauri type (INT)

Astrometry
Proper motion (μ)	RA: -12.059 mas/yr Dec.: -23.727 mas/yr
Parallax (π)	6.4175±0.022 mas
Distance	508 ± 2 ly (155.8 ± 0.5 pc)

Details
Mass	1 M_{☉}
Luminosity	0.9 L_{☉}
Age	0.5 - 1 Myr

Other designations
- HIP 78053, WDS J15562-3756A, GSC 07838-00962, IRAS 15528-3747, 2MASS J15560921-3756057

Database references
SIMBAD	data

IM Lupi is a young stellar object with a surrounding protoplanetary disk. The young star is suspected to host a still forming protoplanet at a distance of 110 astronomical units (AU) and a mass of 2-3 M_{J}. IM Lupi is 508 light-years (156 parsec) distant.

== Star ==
The star IM Lupi was classified as a class II YSO with a spectral type M0. The star is probably not actively accreting, but there is evidence that the accretion is variable around IM Lupi. The young star is associated with the Lupus 2 Molecular Cloud.

== Protoplanetary Disk ==
Many features at different wavelengths have been observed in this disk, which is very massive (0.17 M_{☉}). The disk has a gas and a dust component. The gas component reaches out to 751 AU and the smaller dust component reaches out to 334 AU. In a scattered light image from SPHERE the upper surface and part of the lower surface was imaged. Dust observations with ALMA shows two rings and with SPHERE 2 additional rings were detected. ALMA observations at 1.25 mm shows a spiral pattern, which is also imprinted on the surface of the dusty part as seen by SPHERE. ALMA also observed the molecule ^{12}CO, which traces the gas component of the disk. The CO observations show several deviations from Keplerian motion in the form of 16 kinks. The kinks and spirals could be caused by an undetected planet with a mass of 2-3 M_{J} orbiting at about 110 AU. It is also possible that gravitational instability causes the patterns in this disk.
