= WISPIT 1 =

Star system in the constellation Puppis

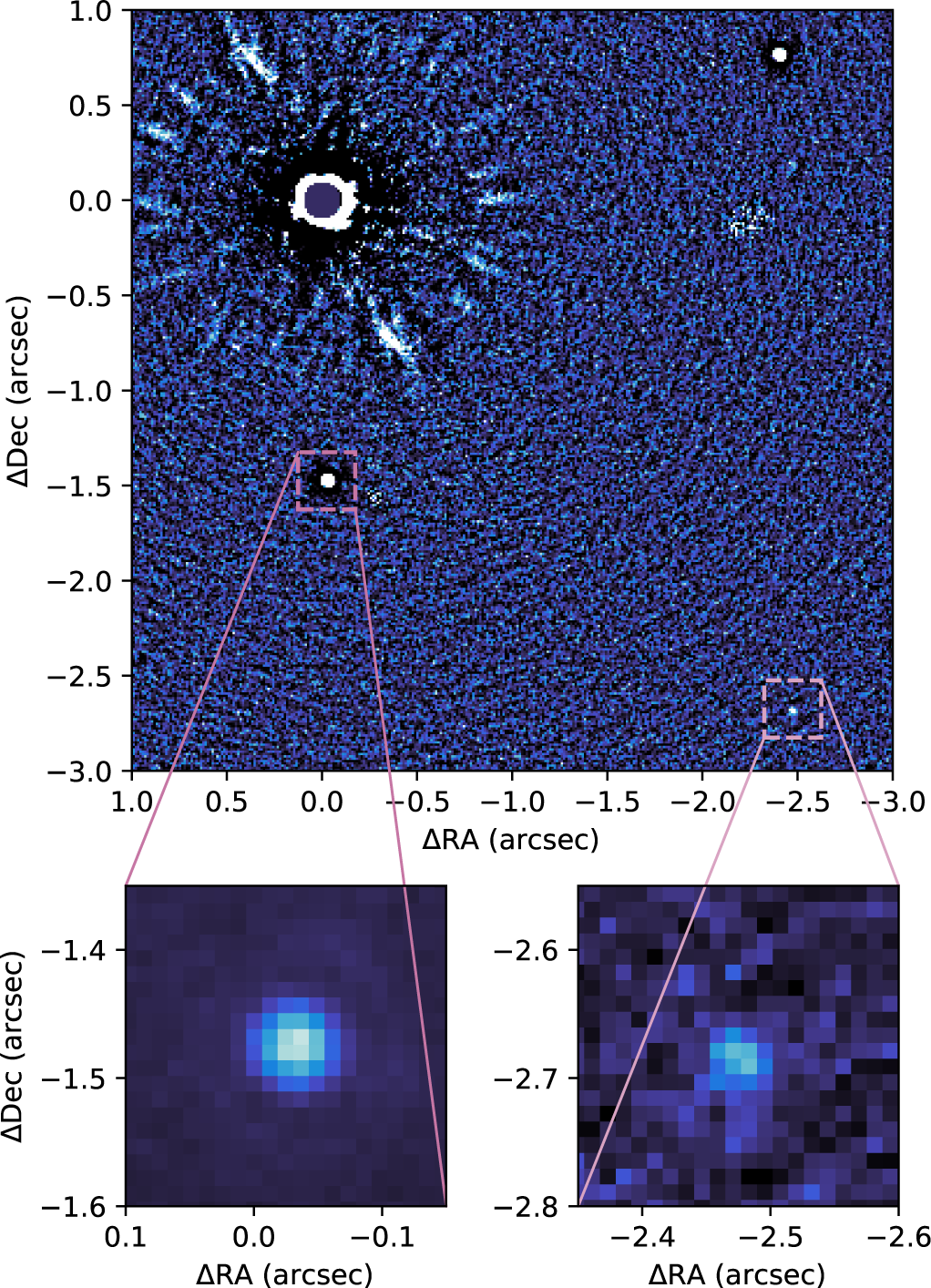
- SPHERE/IRDIS H-band imagery of the WISPIT 1 system taken on 2022 November 19. The stellar binary WISPIT 1 (behind the coronagraph) in the upper left. Companions highlighted with coloured boxes, with zoomed-in images in the bottom panels. Credit: R. F. van Capelleveen et al.

Observation data Epoch J2000 Equinox J2000
- Constellation: Puppis
- Right ascension: 07^{h} 51^{m} 11.69^{s}
- Declination: −50° 08′ 15.88″
- Apparent magnitude (V): 13.146

Characteristics
- Evolutionary stage: pre-main-sequence star
- Spectral type: K4V + M5.5V

Astrometry
Radial velocity (R_{v})	21.08±5.61 km/s
Proper motion (μ)	RA: −19.824±0.016 mas/yr Dec.: 14.021±0.017 mas/yr
Parallax (π)	4.3652±0.0137 mas
Distance	747 ± 2 ly (229.1 ± 0.7 pc)

Details

A
Mass	0.92±0.04 M_{☉}
Radius	0.92 (Note: Calculated, using the Stefan-Boltzmann law and the star's effective temperature and luminosity, with respect to the solar nominal effective temperature of 5,772 K: $$\sqrt{\biggl(\frac{5,772}{4,670}\biggr)^4 \cdot 0.36} = 0.92\ R_\odot.$$) R_{☉}
Luminosity	0.36 L_{☉}
Surface gravity (log g)	4.0 cgs
Temperature	4670+990 −540 K
Age	15.6+4.1 −3.7 Myr

B
Radius	1.05 (Note: Calculated, using the Stefan-Boltzmann law and the star's effective temperature and luminosity, with respect to the solar nominal effective temperature of 5,772 K: $$\sqrt{\biggl(\frac{5,772}{2,900}\biggr)^4 \cdot 0.07} = 1.05\ R_\odot.$$) R_{☉}
Luminosity	0.07 L_{☉}
Surface gravity (log g)	4.5 cgs
Temperature	2900+560 −280 K
Age	15.6+4.1 −3.7 Myr

Other designations
- TIC 268764100, 2MASS J07511168-5008158, WISE J075111.66-500815.8, Gaia DR2 5517037434775143808, Gaia DR3 5517037434775143808, UCAC4 200-015587

Database references
SIMBAD	data
Exoplanet Archive	data

WISPIT 1 is a young binary star system hosting two giant exoplanets on wide orbits. The system was the first target of the astronomical survey Wide Separation Planets In Time (WISPIT), which observed the system with VLT/SPHERE in the near-infrared range, obtaining direct images of the two circumbinary planets, as well as discovering the binary nature of the star. WISPIT 1 is the first directly imaged multi-planet system around a binary star with a solar-type primary.

== Stellar characteristics ==
WISPIT 1 is a close stellar binary which is only marginally resolved in the observations, with the much fainter secondary visible as a bump on the shape of the merged image of both stars on VLT/SPHERE imagery. The WISPIT survey observations, which were performed on 19 November 2022, 3 December 2023, and 30 November 2024, showed negligible motion of the secondary relative to the primary, which confirms that the secondary is a bound companion and not a background star. To derive the calculation, the shape of the combined stars' image was fitted to a model of two separate sources, which implies a physical projected separation of at least 10.5 au, corresponding to a Keplerian orbit of a period of at least 34 years.

The age of the system is determined based on the abundance of lithium, which is a crucial indicator of age in pre-main-sequence stars due to the lithium burning process. The evolutionary model of lithium depletion for the primary star corresponds to an age of 15.6+1.4
−1.2 Ma.

The calculated age is similar also to that of a nearby faint red star 2MASS J07485619-4656229. Another nearby star with a similar proper motion is 2MASS J07512310-5008109, which also appears to be young based on fast rotation. This implies a common origin of the stars.

== Planetary system ==
The binary star is accompanied by two gas giants on very wide orbits, observed at projected separations of 338 au and 840 au. Their status as planetary companions rather than background objects is confirmed by a common proper motion during the two years of observations with VLT/SPHERE. The orbital period cannot be determined yet as no orbital motion was detected during the timeframe of available observations.

The mass of the two planets can be estimated based on the observed magnitude and colour index in comparison to the theoretical isochrones, assuming that the planets have the same age as the star. The inferred masses are below the deuterium burning limit, confirming their nature as planets rather than brown dwarfs. The planet WISPIT 1b has a colour similar to that of other directly imaged gas giants, and implied mass of 10.4+0.7
−0.8 M_{J}. WISPIT 1c is one of the faintest planets imaged in both H and K_{s} bands at the time of its discovery. Its mass is most likely in the range of 5.3+0.8
−0.6 M_{J}, though van Capelleveen et al. note that different isochrones predict significantly different masses, with the reported mass interpolated between the two models used in the study.

The WISPIT 1 planetary system
Companion (in order from star)	Mass	Semimajor axis (AU)	Orbital period (years)	Eccentricity	Inclination (°)	Radius
b	10.4+0.7 −0.8 M_{J}	338	—	—	—	—
c	5.3+0.8 −0.6 M_{J}	840	—	—	—	—

== See also ==
- WISPIT 2
- YSES 1 – a system with a similar primary star and two similar planets
- 1RXS J160929.1−210524 – hosts a similar planet to b
- Ross 458 – hosts a similar planet to c
- HD 106906 – another young circumbinary system
- HD 129116 – another young circumbinary system
