= Protoplanet =

Large planetary embryo

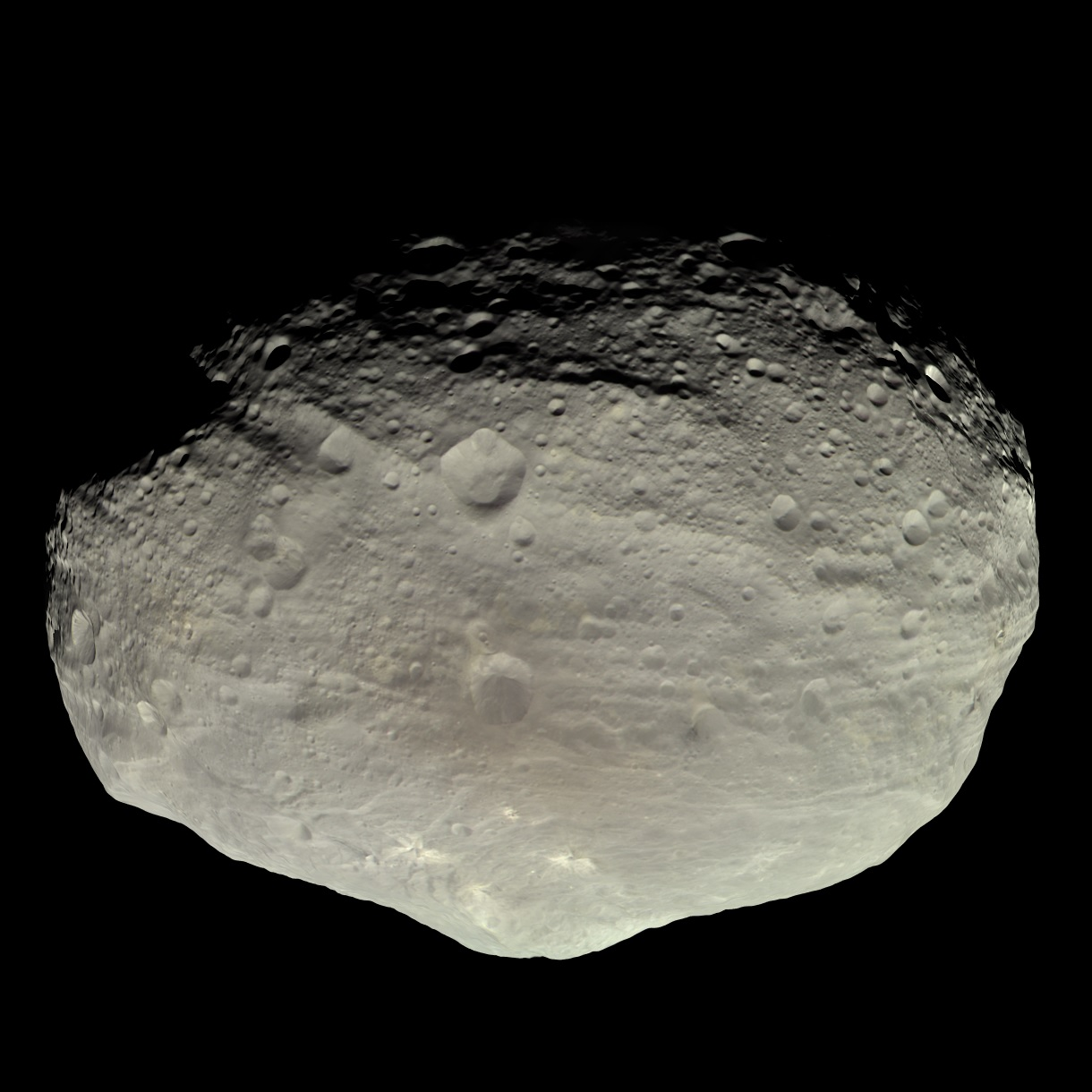
Vesta is one of the best known examples of a protoplanet.

A protoplanet or planetary embryo is an astronomical body originated within a protoplanetary disk that has undergone internal melting to produce a differentiated interior.

Protoplanets are thought to form out of kilometre-sized planetesimals that gravitationally perturb each other's orbits and collide, gradually coalescing into larger bodies through a process known as "runaway growth". Once accumulated enough mass, protoplanets will begin to assume a spherical shape due to hydrostatic equilibrium and become dwarf planets, those of which that subsequently succeed in dominating their own orbit will become planets proper.

An alternative formation pathway of protoplanets is a process called disk fragmentation. Formation by this process, also called gravitational (disk) instability, is favoured for giant planets on wide orbits.

== The planetesimal hypothesis ==
A planetesimal is an object formed from dust, rock, and other materials, measuring from meters to hundreds of kilometers in size. According to the Chamberlin–Moulton planetesimal hypothesis and the theories of Viktor Safronov, a protoplanetary disk of materials such as gas and dust would orbit a star early in the formation of a planetary system. The action of gravity on such materials form larger and larger chunks until some reach the size of planetesimals.

It is thought that the collisions of planetesimals created a few hundred larger planetary embryos. Over the course of hundreds of millions of years, they collided with one another. The exact sequence whereby planetary embryos collided to assemble the planets is not known, but it is thought that initial collisions would have replaced the first "generation" of embryos with a second generation consisting of fewer but larger embryos. These in their turn would have collided to create a third generation of fewer but even larger embryos. Eventually, only a handful of embryos were left, which collided to complete the assembly of the planets proper.

Early protoplanets had more radioactive elements, the quantity of which has been reduced over time due to radioactive decay. Heating due to radioactivity, impact, and gravitational pressure melted parts of protoplanets as they grew toward being planets. In melted zones their heavier elements sank to the center, whereas lighter elements rose to the surface. Such a process is known as planetary differentiation. The composition of some meteorites show that differentiation took place in some asteroids.

== Evidence in the Solar System ==
In the case of the Solar System, it is thought that the collisions of planetesimals created a few hundred planetary embryos. Such embryos were similar to Ceres and Pluto with masses of about 10^{22} to 10^{23} kg and were a few thousand km in diameter.

According to the giant impact hypothesis, the Moon formed from a colossal impact of a hypothetical protoplanet called Theia with Earth, early in the Solar System's history.

In the inner Solar System, the three protoplanets to survive more-or-less intact are the asteroids Ceres, Pallas, and Vesta. Psyche is likely the survivor of a violent hit-and-run with another object that stripped off the outer, rocky layers of a protoplanet. The asteroid Metis may also have a similar origin history to that of Psyche. The asteroid Lutetia also has characteristics that resemble a protoplanet. Kuiper-belt dwarf planets have also been referred to as protoplanets. Because iron meteorites have been found on Earth, it is deemed likely that there once were other metal-cored protoplanets in the asteroid belt that since have been disrupted and that are the source of these meteorites.

== Extrasolar protoplanets ==
The first directly imaged exoplanet candidates were confirmed in 2005. Several of them are very young, DH Tauri b, GQ Lupi b, 2M1207b and show signs of accretion. However, all these candidates either lack in confirmation of a planetary mass or in confirmation that they formed within the protoplanetary disk of the host object.

In January 2012 astronomers made the first direct observation of a candidate protoplanet forming in a disk of gas and dust around a distant star, LkCa 15. Subsequent observations, however, refuted the existence of this candidate.

In February 2013 astronomers made the first direct observation of a candidate protoplanet, that is still a candidate, forming in a disk of gas and dust around a distant star, HD 100546. Subsequent observations suggest that several protoplanets may be present in the gas disk.

Another protoplanet, AB Aur b, may be in the earliest observed stage of formation for a gas giant. It is located in the gas disk of the star AB Aurigae. AB Aur b is among the largest exoplanets identified, and has a distant orbit, three times as far as Neptune is from the Earth's sun. Observations of AB Aur b may challenge conventional thinking about how planets are formed. It was viewed by the Subaru Telescope and the Hubble Space Telescope.

One more example of a Protoplanet is HD 100546 B a planet outside of our solar system And could potentially be the biggest planet in the observable universe, though scientists are still uncertain about it’s real size.

Rings, gaps, spirals, dust concentrations and shadows in protoplanetary disks could be caused by protoplanets. These structures are not completely understood and are therefore not seen as a proof for the presence of a protoplanet. One new emerging way to study the effect of protoplanets on the disk are molecular line observations of protoplanetary disks in the form of gas velocity maps. HD 97048 b is the first protoplanet detected by disk kinematics in the form of a kink in the gas velocity map.

List of confirmed protoplanets (described as "protoplanets" in literature)
Star	Exoplanet	Mass (M_{J})	Period (yr)	Separation (AU)	Distance to Earth (Parsec)	Year of Discovery	Detection technique
PDS 70	PDS 70 b	6+6 −4	119	20 ± 2	112	2018	Direct Imaging
PDS 70	PDS 70 c	9+9 −6	227	34 ^{+6}_{−3}	112	2019	Direct imaging
HD 97048	HD 97048 b	2.5 ± 0.5	956	130	184	2019	Disk Kinematics
HD 169142	HD 169142 b	3 ± 2	167	37.2± 1.5	114	2019/2023	Direct Imaging
TYC 5709-354-1	WISPIT 2b	5.3 ± 1.0		54	133	2025	Direct Imaging
TYC 5709-354-1	WISPIT 2c	8–12		15	133	2025/2026	Direct Imaging
Elias 2-24	Elias 2-24b	2–5		52	139	2023/2026	Direct Imaging + Disk Kinematics

=== Unconfirmed protoplanets ===
The confident detection of protoplanets is difficult. Protoplanets usually exist in gas-rich protoplanetary disks. Over-densities within these disks can mimic protoplanets. A number of unconfirmed protoplanet candidates are known and some detections were later questioned.

List of unconfirmed/disputed/refuted protoplanets
Star/host	Exoplanet	Mass (M_{J})	Period (yr)	Separation (AU)	Distance to Earth (Parsec)	Year of Discovery	Status	Detection technique
DH Tauri	DH Tauri b	8–50		330	135	2005	unconfirmed planetary mass and formation in disk	Direct Imaging
GQ Lupi	GQ Lupi b	1–36		103	152	2005	unconfirmed planetary mass and formation in disk	Direct Imaging
2M1207	2M1207b	5–6		49.8	65	2005	unconfirmed formation in disk	Direct Imaging
LkCa 15	LkCa 15 b			12.7		2012	refuted in 2019	Direct Imaging
LkCa 15	LkCa 15 c			18.6		2015	refuted in 2019	Direct Imaging
LkCa 15	LkCa 15 d			24.7		2015	refuted in 2019	Direct Imaging
HD 100546	HD 100546 b	4–13	249	53 ± 2	108	2015	disputed in 2017	Direct Imaging
Gomez's Hamburger	GoHam b	0.8–11.4		350 ± 50	250	2015	unconfirmed candidate	Direct Imaging
AB Aurigae	AB Aur b	9–20		94 ± 49	156	2022	disputed in 2023 and 2024	Direct Imaging
IM Lupi		2–3		110		2022	unconfirmed candidate	Disk Kinematics
HD 163296	multiple?					2022	unconfirmed candidates	Disk Kinematics
2MJ1612	2MJ1612b	4		23.45 ± 0.29	132	2025	unconfirmed candidate	Direct Imaging (ASDI)
EK Chamaeleontis	EK Cha b	8.5+6.46 −3.92		46±4	98	2026	unconfirmed candidate	Direct Imaging

== See also ==
- Accretion (astrophysics)
- Fusor (astronomy)
- Mesoplanet
- Planetesimal
