= Elias 2-24 =

T Tauri star in the constellation Ophiuchus

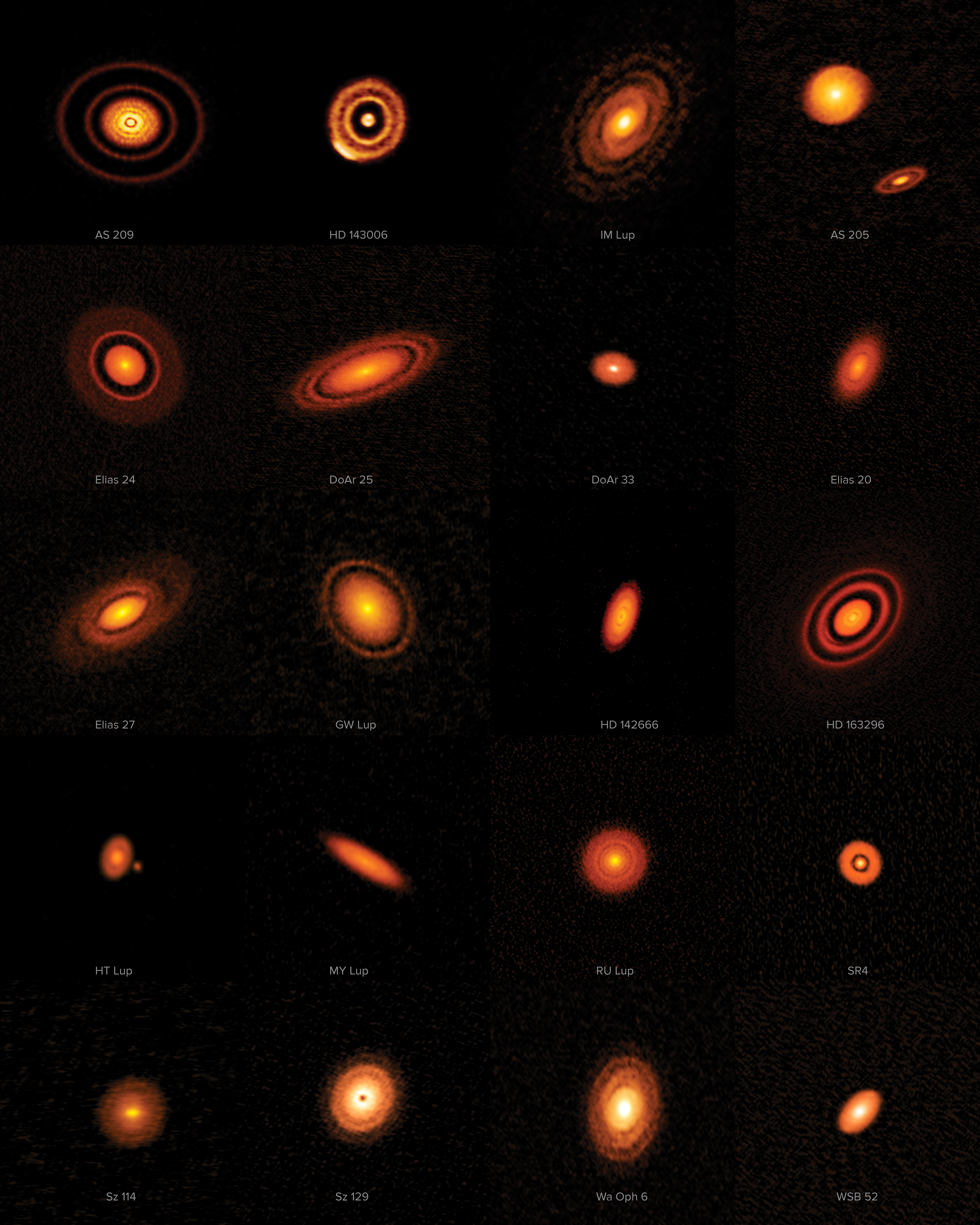
- Disk around Elias 2-24. The protoplanet (not shown) is located inside the large gap Credit: ALMA (ESO/NAOJ/NRAO), S. Andrews et al.; NRAO/AUI/NSF, S. Dagnello

Observation data Epoch J2000 Equinox J2000
- Constellation: Ophiuchus
- Right ascension: 16^{h} 26^{m} 24.09^{s}
- Declination: −24° 16′ 13.4″

Characteristics
- Evolutionary stage: T Tauri star
- Spectral type: K5.5

Astrometry
Radial velocity (R_{v})	−7.260740±0.013915 km/s
Proper motion (μ)	RA: −7.971±0.083 mas/yr Dec.: −24.725±0.066 mas/yr
Parallax (π)	7.1809±0.0639 mas
Distance	454 ± 4 ly (139 ± 1 pc)

Details
Mass	0.78+0.35 −0.13 M_{☉}
Temperature	4265±300 K
Age	0.4 Myr

Other designations
- Elias 24, Elia 2-24, 2MASS J16262407-2416134, EPIC 203953466, IRAS 16233-2409, ISO-Oph 40

Database references
SIMBAD	data

Elias 2-24 is a heavily accreting T Tauri star surrounded by a protoplanetary disk and has one confirmed protoplanet inside the disk gap. At the time of confirmation, the planet is the youngest exoplanet discovered, with an age younger than or approximately equal to 1 Myr.

The system is named after J. H. Elias and is part of a catalog of infrared sources in the Rho Ophiuchi Cloud complex.

== Protoplanetary disk ==
The disk around the star has a mass of around 0.12 M_{☉}. The disk gaps were first noticed in 2017 using ALMA continuum observations. The middle gap is located at 52 astronomical units (AU) and has a width of 28 AU. The researchers estimated that this gap hosts a planet with a mass of 1 to 8 M_{J}. Another study with ALMA found that the gap is produced by a protoplanet with a mass of around 0.7 M_{J}. A higher resolution ALMA image was obtained with DSHARP. The observation showed one gap at 57 AU, consistent with the middle gap of the previous observation. It also showed a narrow ring at 77 AU, which is consistent with the simulation of a disk with a 0.8 M_{J} protoplanet inside it. ALMA observations showed that the CO gas disk kinematics are disturbed by the protoplanet. Additionally the image showed traces of a spiral wake produced by the orbiting protoplanet.

== Protoplanet ==
A candidate protoplanet was first detected in 2021 using the Very Large Telescope NaCo instrument in the infrared L' band at 55 au inside the gap of the protoplanetary disk. Later a carbon monoxide (CO) emission was detected with ALMA at the position of the candidate. The morphology of the bright spot is consistent with emission by a circumplanetary disk. The protoplanet was recovered with Keck NIRC2 observations. This study also confirmed the planetary nature of this source. The mass was estimated between 1.9 and 4.0 M_{J}. The researchers caution that this estimate is an upper limit because of strong disk extinction and accretion effects. The protoplanet has a temperature between 1,100 K (830 °C; 1,520 °F) to 2,000 K (1,730 °C; 3,140 °F), meaning it could be similar to L dwarfs or T dwarfs. Because of the young age of less than or approximately equal to 1 Myr, the planet is at an early stage of its formation. At this stage the planet is rapidly gaining mass by accreting its envelope.

== Gallery ==
Elias 2-24 in near-infrared with ESO VISIONS, showing the surrounding nebula.

Elias 2-24 b with Keck in 2018
