= What's in a Name? (short story) =

- Short story by Isaac Asimov
- Original title: Death of a Honey-Blonde
- Country: United States
- Language: English
- Genre: mystery

Publication
- Published in: The Saint Detective Magazine
- Publication type: Periodical
- Publisher: Fiction Publishing
- Media type: Print (magazine)
- Publication date: June 1956

"What's in a Name?" is a mystery short story by American writer Isaac Asimov. It first appeared in the June 1956 issue of The Saint Detective Magazine under the title Death of a Honey-Blonde and was reprinted in the 1968 collection Asimov's Mysteries under its original title.

The title is from William Shakespeare's Romeo and Juliet (Act 2, scene 2): "What's in a name? that which we call a rose/ By any other name would smell as sweet".

== Plot summary ==
A detective arrives to investigate a mysterious death at Carmody University. Louella-Marie Busch and Susan Morey were known as the "library twins" due to their similar appearance and work at the science reference library. Busch is dead after drinking tea laced with potassium cyanide. The detective proves, with a professor's help, that it was the survivor, Morey, who prepared the tea by showing that she did not know the name of the one person who inquired at the reference desk while the tea was being prepared, a furrier named Ernest Beilstein. Professor Rodney alleges that Morey could not possibly have forgotten this due to the coincidence of his sharing a name with Beilstein's Handbook of Organic Chemistry, a sixty volume encyclopedia of chemical compounds and reactions.
