= PDS 70 =

T Tauri-type star in the constellation Centaurus

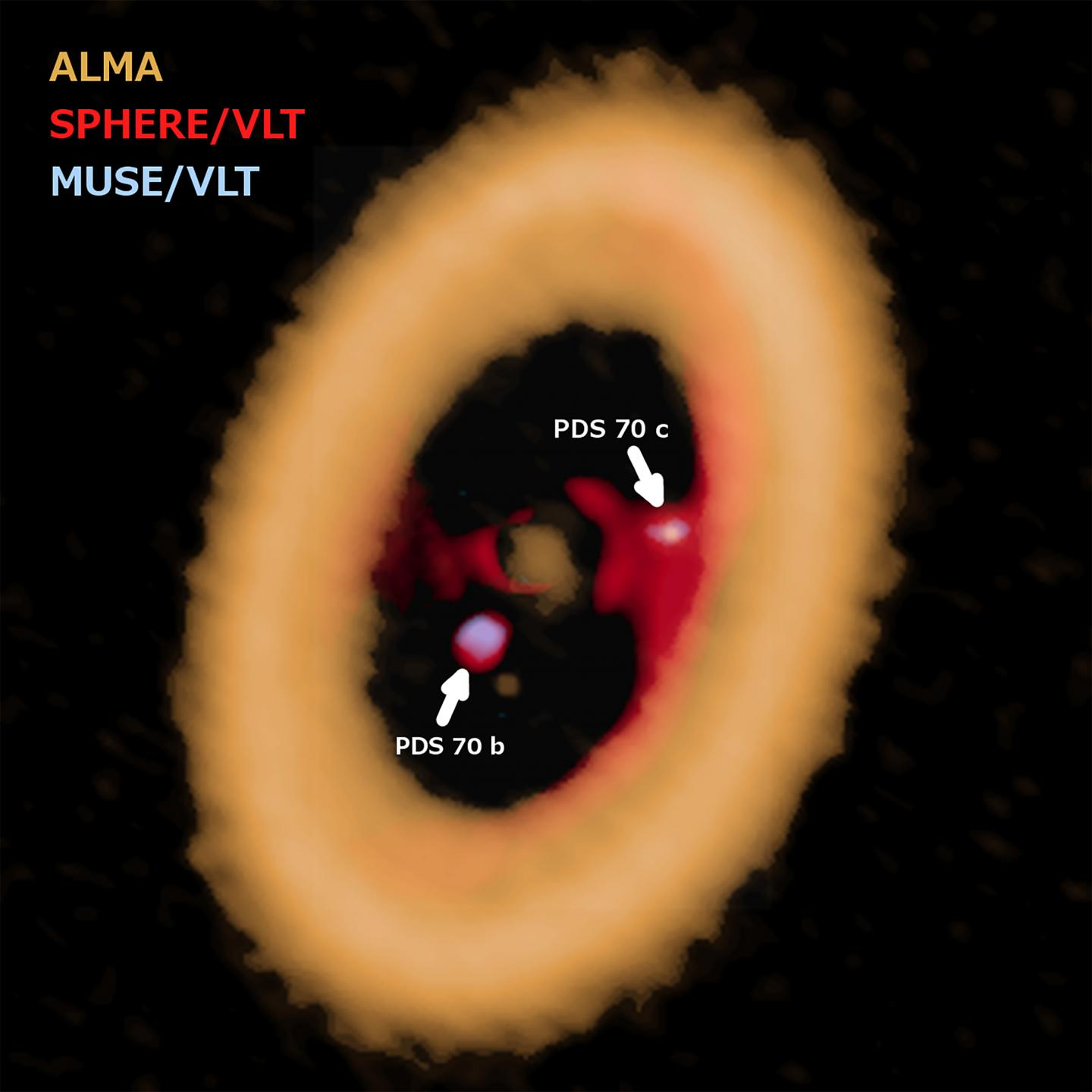
- The protoplanetary disk of PDS 70 with PDS 70b (bottom-left) and PDS 70c (right)

Observation data Epoch J2000 Equinox ICRS
- Constellation: Centaurus
- Right ascension: 14^{h} 08^{m} 10.15455^{s}
- Declination: −41° 23′ 52.5733″
- Apparent magnitude (V): 12

Characteristics
- Evolutionary stage: Pre-main-sequence (T Tauri)
- Spectral type: K7
- U−B color index: 0.71
- B−V color index: 1.06

Astrometry
Radial velocity (R_{v})	0.74±3.22 km/s
Proper motion (μ)	RA: −29.697 mas/yr Dec.: −24.041 mas/yr
Parallax (π)	8.8975±0.0191 mas
Distance	366.6 ± 0.8 ly (112.4 ± 0.2 pc)

Details
Mass	0.901+0.067 −0.060 M_{☉}
Radius	1.14±0.03 R_{☉}
Luminosity	0.35±0.09 L_{☉}
Temperature	4247+31 −39 K
Rotation	~50 days
Rotational velocity (v sin i)	~10 km/s
Age	5.4±1.0 Myr

Other designations
- V1032 Cen, 2MASS J14081015−4123525, IRAS 14050−4109

Database references
SIMBAD	data

PDS 70 (V1032 Centauri) is a very young T Tauri star in the constellation Centaurus. Located 370 light-years (110 parsecs) from Earth, it has a mass of 0.76 M_{☉} and is approximately 5.4 million years old. The star has a protoplanetary disk containing two nascent exoplanets, named PDS 70b and PDS 70c, which have been directly imaged by the European Southern Observatory's Very Large Telescope, as well as a third unconfirmed protoplanet. PDS 70b was the first confirmed protoplanet to be directly imaged.

== Discovery and naming ==
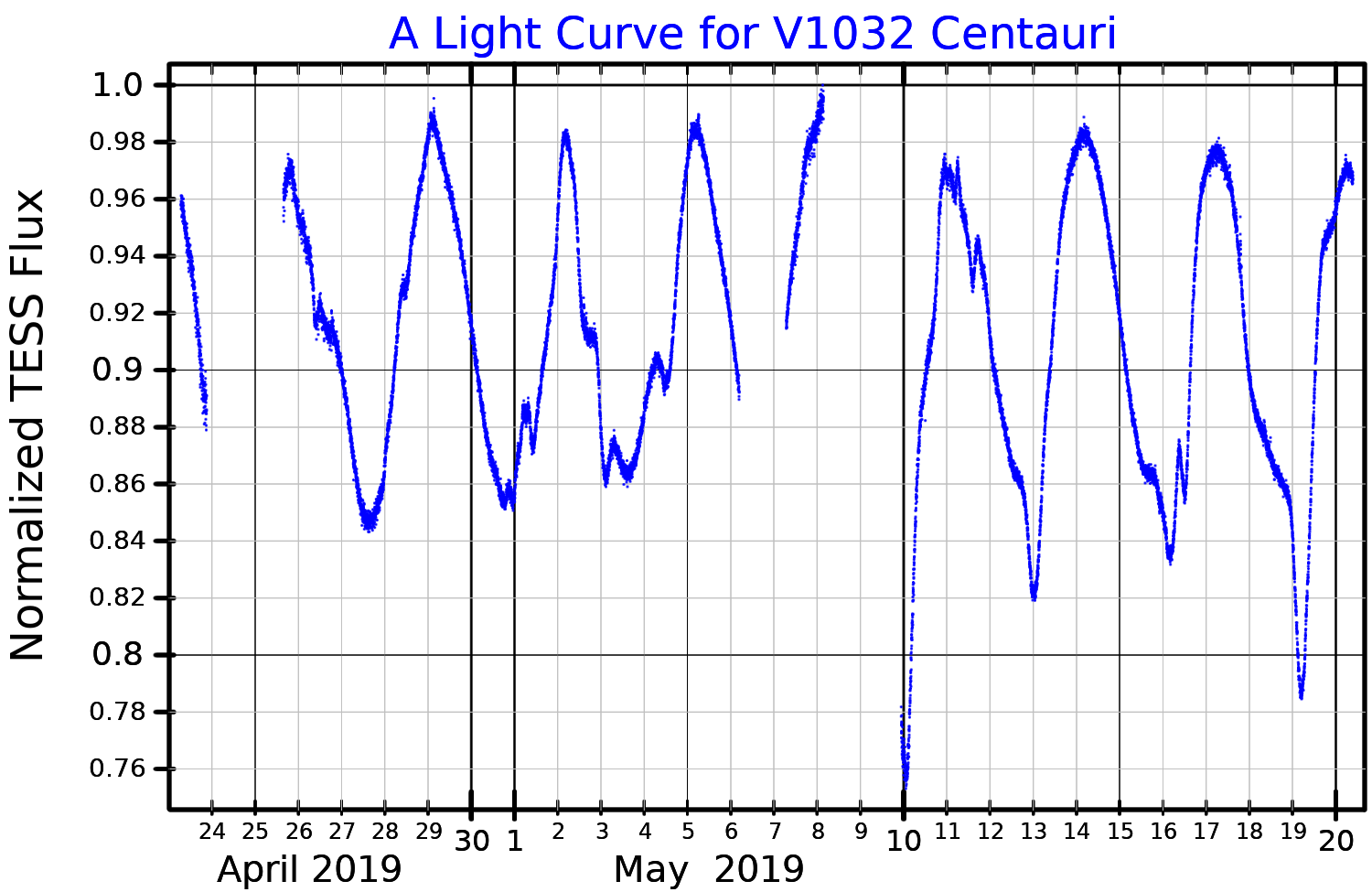
A light curve for PDS 70 (aka V1032 Centauri), plotted from TESS data

The "PDS" in this star's name stands for Pico dos Dias Survey, a survey that looked for pre-main-sequence stars based on the star's infrared colors measured by the IRAS satellite. PDS 70 was identified as a T Tauri variable star in 1992, from these infrared colors. PDS 70's brightness varies quasi-periodically with an amplitude of a few hundredths of a magnitude in visible light. Measurements of the star's period in the astronomical literature are inconsistent, ranging from 3.007 days to 5.1 or 5.6 days.

== Protoplanetary disk ==
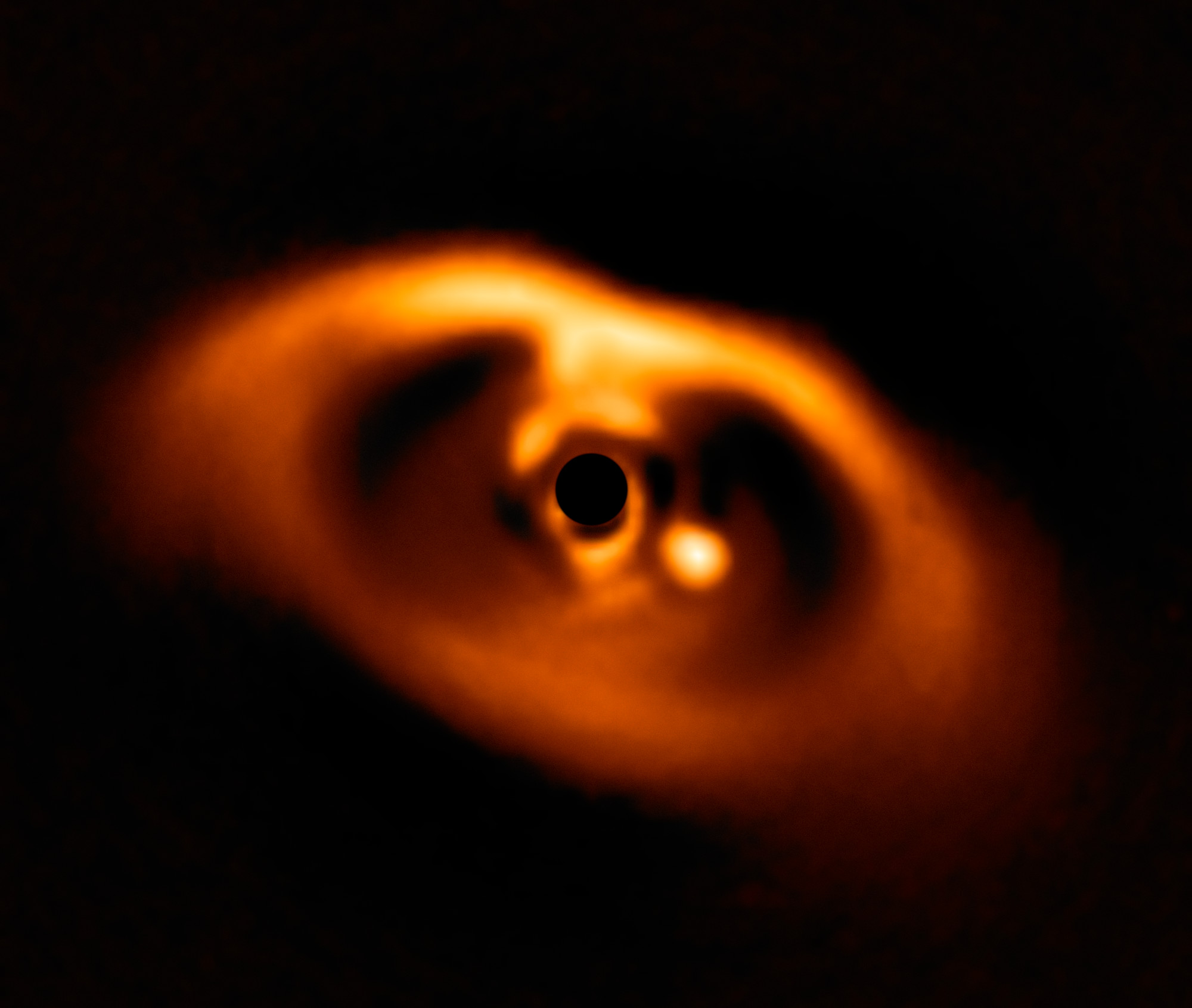
The protoplanetary disk of PDS 70 with new planet PDS 70b (right)

The protoplanetary disk around PDS 70 was first hypothesized in 1992 and fully imaged in 2006 with phase-mask coronagraph on the VLT. The disk has a radius of approximately 140 au. In 2012 a large gap (~65 au) in the disk was discovered, which was thought to be caused by planetary formation.

The gap was later found to have multiple regions: large dust grains were absent out to 80 au, while small dust grains were only absent out to the previously-observed 65 au. There is an asymmetry in the overall shape of the gap; these factors indicate that there are likely multiple planets affecting the shape of the gap and the dust distribution.

The James Webb Space Telescope has been used to detect water vapor in the inner part of the disk, where terrestrial planets may be forming.

== Planetary system ==
The PDS 70 planetary system
Companion (in order from star)	Mass	Semimajor axis (AU)	Orbital period (years)	Eccentricity	Inclination (°)	Radius
d (dubious)	5.2+3.3 −3.5 M_{J}	12.9+2.0 −2.1	—	0.16+0.16 −0.12	146+12 −9°	—
b	8.0+4.8 −5.2 M_{J}	24.8±2.4	123.5+9.8 −4.9	0.103+0.069 −0.056	127.4+3.8 −2.8	1.77±0.08 R_{J}
c	7.6±5.0 M_{J}	36.6+2.0 −3.4	191.5+15.8 −31.5	0.052+0.061 −0.037	128.9+2.1 −3.1	2.22+0.20 −0.18 R_{J}
Protoplanetary disk	~65–140 AU				~130°	—

In results published in 2018, a planet in the disk, named PDS 70 b, was imaged with SPHERE planet imager at the Very Large Telescope (VLT). With a mass estimated to be a few times greater than Jupiter, the planet is thought to have a temperature of around 1,200 K (930 °C; 1,700 °F) and an atmosphere with clouds; its orbit has an approximate radius of 20.8 AU (3.11 billion kilometres), taking around 120 years for a revolution.

The emission spectrum of the planet PDS 70 b is gray and featureless, and no molecular species were detected by 2021.

A second planet, designated PDS 70 c, was discovered in 2019 using the VLT's MUSE integral field spectrograph. The planet orbits its host star at a distance of 34.3 AU (5.13 billion kilometres), farther away than PDS 70 b. PDS 70 c is in a near 1:2 orbital resonance with PDS 70 b, meaning that PDS 70 c completes nearly one revolution once every time PDS 70 b completes nearly two.

=== Circumplanetary disks ===
Modelling predicts that PDS 70 b has acquired its own circumplanetary disk (CPD). The CPD was at first observationally supported in 2019, however, in 2020 evidence was presented that the current data favor a model with a single component of the planet. The accretion rate was measured to be at least 5 • 10^{−7} Jupiter masses per year. A 2021 study with newer methods and data suggested a lower accretion rate of (1.4±0.2)×10^{−8} M_{J} per year. It is not clear how to reconcile these results with each other and with existing planetary accretion models; future research in accretion mechanisms and Hα emissions production should offer clarity.

In July 2019, astronomers using the Atacama Large Millimeter Array (ALMA) reported the first-ever detection of a moon-forming circumplanetary disk. The disk was detected around PDS 70 c, with a potential disk observed around PDS 70 b. The two planets and the superposition of PDS 70 c and the protoplanetary disk was confirmed by Caltech-led researchers using the W. M. Keck Observatory in Mauna Kea, whose research was published in May 2020. An image of the circumplanetary disk around PDS 70 c separated from the protoplanetary disk was finally confirming the circumplanetary disk and was published in November 2021.

In 2025 two studies found variable accretion from the variable H-alpha emission line for both planet b and c. One work used Magellan/MagAO-X and the other used Hubble. Planet b did show a general fading trend, with a decrease in brightness by a factor of 4.6. Planet c did increase in brightness by a factor of 2.3 between 2023 and 2024. The MagAO-X observations also suggest in reasonably good agreement with a predicted scattered light model of a CPD that both planets are surrounded by a compact disk with a radius of about 3 astronomical units.

=== Claim of planet d ===
VLT/SPHERE observations showed a third object 0.12 arcseconds from the star. Its spectrum is very blue, possibly due to star light reflected in dust. It could be a feature of the inner disk. The possibility does still exist that this object is a planetary mass object enshrouded by a dust envelope. For this second scenario the mass of the planet would be on the order of a few tens M_{🜨}. JWST NIRCam observations also detected this object. It is located at around 13.5 AU and if it is a planet, it would be in a 1:2:4 mean-motion resonance with the other protoplanets. In 2025 a team combined VLT/SPHERE, VLT/NaCo, VLT/SINFONI and JWST/NIRcam observations and detected Keplerian motion of the candidate. The planet candidate is detected over nine epochs ranging nine years of observations. The orbit could be in resonance with the other planets. The spectrum in the infrared is mostly consistent with the star PDS 70, but beyond 2.3 μm an infrared excess was detected. This excess could be produced by the thermal emission of the protoplanet, by circumplanetary dust, variability or contamination. The source may not be a point-like source. The source is therefore interpreted as an outer spiral wake from protoplanet d with a dusty envelope. A feature of the inner disk is an alternative explanation of candidate d. Planet-disk simulations suggest PDS 70 "d"'s 1:2:4 mean-motion resonance locking with b and c will allow the system to remain stable in the current configuration for at least a billion years, long after the disk is fully dissipated.

Another candidate, called "CC3" is consistent with a planet at 5.6 AU, but could also be a PSF artifact. It could also be a clump and the same phenomenon as planet "d" from JWST and "CC1" from Hubble, because all three candidates have the a similar position angle.

In a 2026 study, the planet d has not been re-detected at the expected position despite the sensitivity of VLTI/GRAVITY+, suggesting that it should be a dust clump instead of a planet. This situation is similar to that of the Fomalhaut star (see Fomalhaut b).

=== Possible co-orbital body ===
In July 2023, the likely detection of a cloud of debris co-orbital with the planet PDS 70 b was announced. This debris is thought to have a mass 0.03-2 times that of the Moon, and could be evidence of a Trojan planet or one in the process of forming.

== Gallery ==
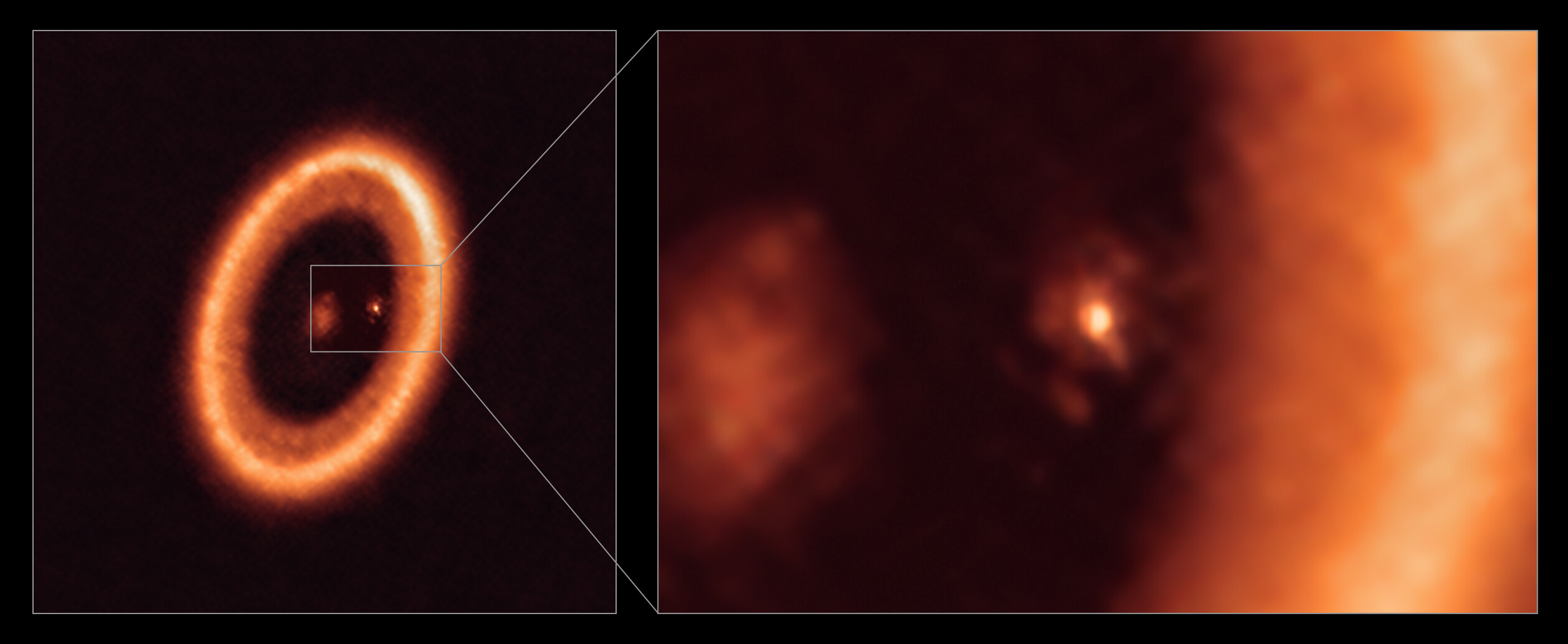
ALMA image of a resolved circumplanetary disk around exoplanet PDS 70c

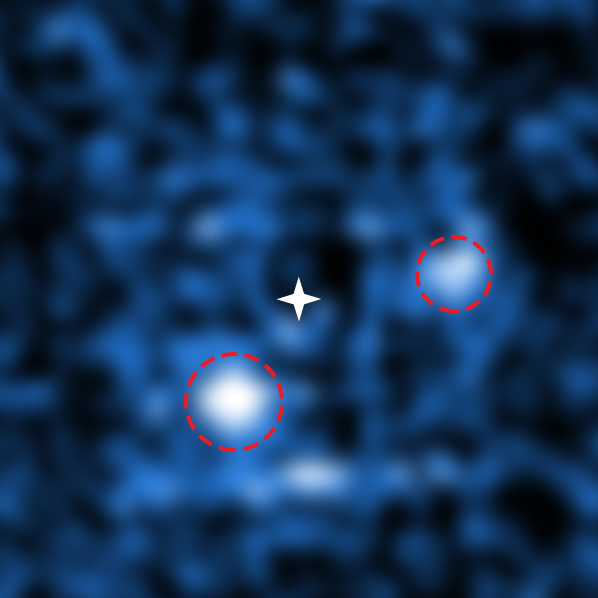
Hubble image of PDS 70. This is only the second multi-planet system to be directly imaged.

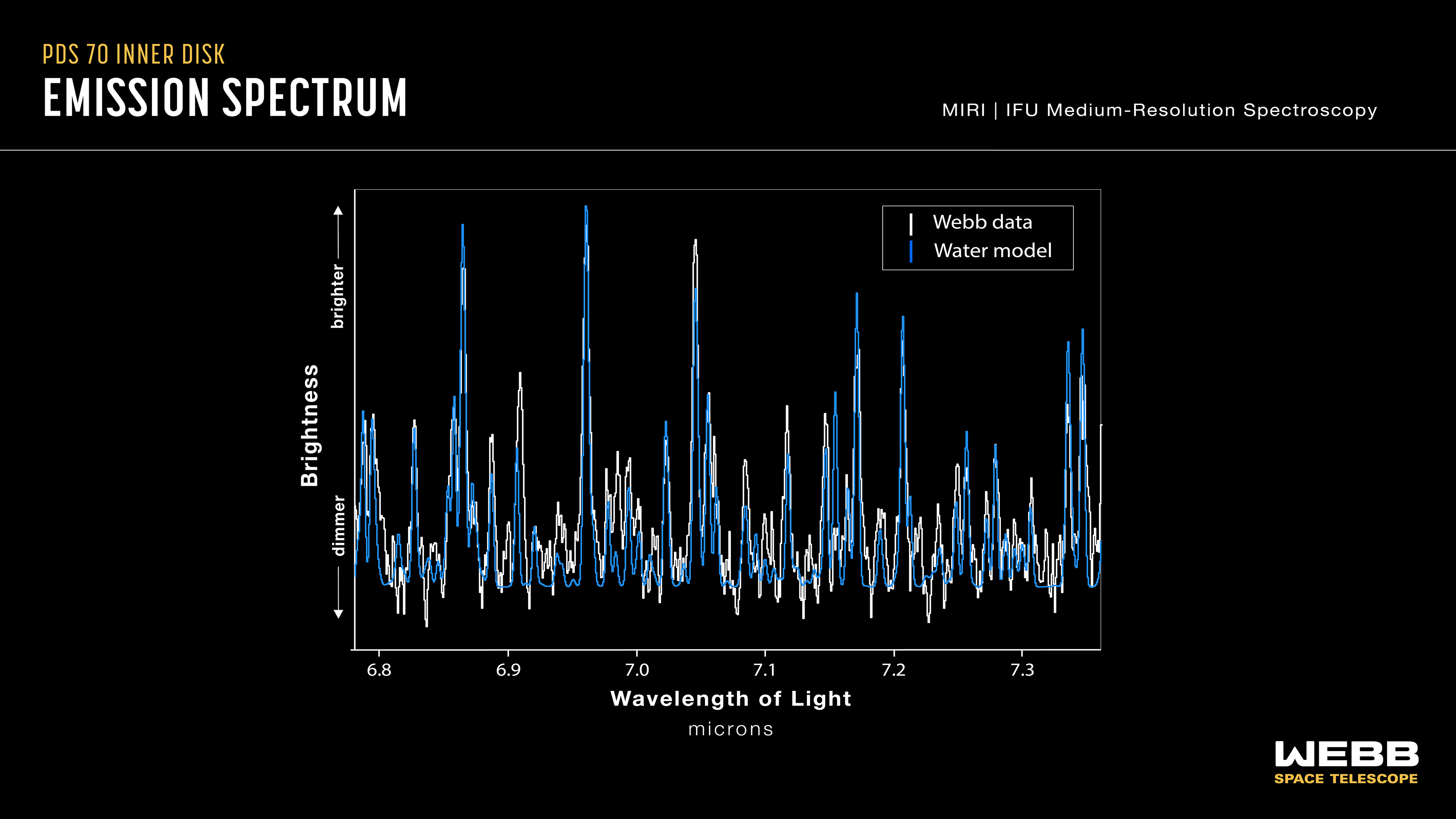
James Webb Space Telescope spectrum of PDS 70, detecting water in the terrestrial region of the protoplanetary disk

== See also ==
- List of brightest stars
- List of nearest bright stars
- Lists of stars
- Historical brightest stars
