= Fusor (astronomy) =

Astronomical object capable of nuclear fusion

Fusor is a proposed term for an astronomical object which is capable of core fusion. The term is more inclusive than star.

== Motivation ==
To help clarify the nomenclature of celestial bodies, Gibor Basri proposed to the IAU that any "object that achieves core fusion during its lifetime" be called a fusor.

This definition includes any form of nuclear fusion, so the lowest possible mass of a fusor was set at roughly 13 M_{J} (Jupiter masses) at which point deuterium fusion becomes possible. This is significantly lower than the point at which sustained fusion of protium (^{1}H, "regular" hydrogen) becomes possible, around 60 M_{J}. Objects are considered "stellar" when they are about 75 M_{J}, when their gravitational contraction is halted by the heat generated by core fusion, establishing hydrostatic equilibrium, and they become main sequence stars. Fusors would include active stars and many brown dwarfs.

The introduction of the term "fusor" would allow for a simple definition:

- Fusor – An object capable of core fusion
- Planemo – A round non-fusor
  - Planet – A planemo that orbits a fusor

In this context, the word round is understood to mean "whose surface is very nearly on the gravitational equipotential", and orbits to mean "whose primary orbit is now, or was in the past around", and capable implies fusion is possible sometime during the existence of the object by itself.

== See also ==
- Gas giant
- Mesoplanet
- Planetar (astronomy)
