= DI Chamaeleontis =

Star system in the constellation Chamaleon

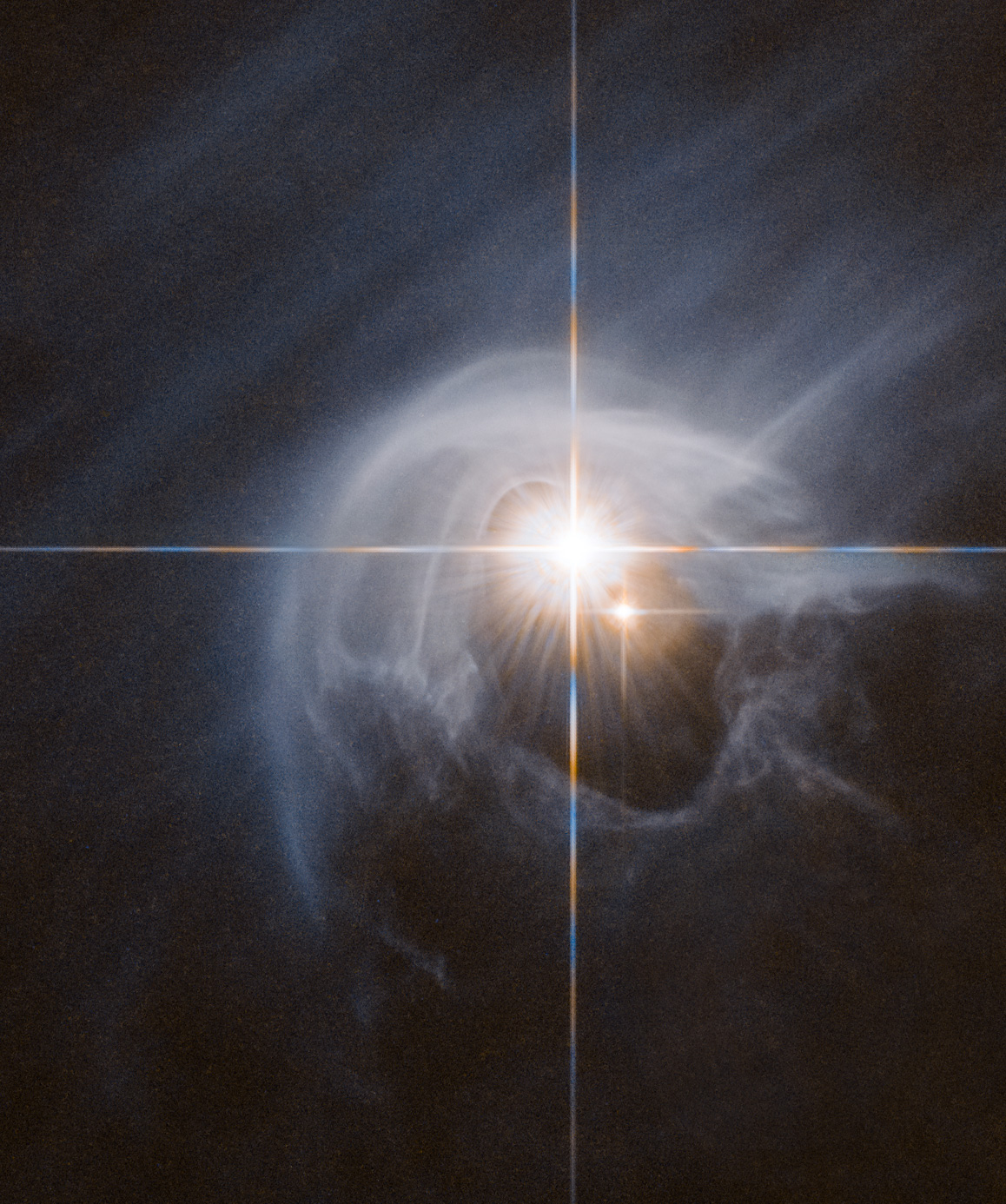
- Image showing DI Cha A and B, each of which is also an even closer binary, and the surrounding nebulosity.

Observation data Epoch J2000 Equinox ICRS
- Constellation: Chamaeleon
- A
- Right ascension: 11^{h} 07^{m} 20.72761^{s}
- Declination: −77° 38′ 07.3081″
- Apparent magnitude (V): 10.72
- A
- Right ascension: 11^{h} 07^{m} 20.18917^{s}
- Declination: −77° 38′ 11.5657″
- Apparent magnitude (V): 16.7

Characteristics
- Spectral type: G0e (G2 + M6 + M5.5 + M5.5)
- U−B color index: +0.630
- B−V color index: +1.144
- Variable type: T Tau

Astrometry

A
Radial velocity (R_{v})	+12.040±0.140 km/s
Proper motion (μ)	RA: −22.552 mas/yr Dec.: +1.214 mas/yr
Parallax (π)	5.2913±0.0133 mas
Distance	616 ± 2 ly (189.0 ± 0.5 pc)

B
Radial velocity (R_{v})	+15.5±0.3 km/s
Proper motion (μ)	RA: −21.477 mas/yr Dec.: +1.289 mas/yr
Parallax (π)	5.2190±0.0719 mas
Distance	625 ± 9 ly (192 ± 3 pc)

Details

Aa
Mass	1.7 M_{☉}
Radius	2.00 R_{☉}
Luminosity	4.7 L_{☉}
Temperature	6,030 K
Age	7.1 Myr

Ba/Bb
Mass	0.18 M_{☉}
Radius	1.13 R_{☉}
Luminosity	0.11 L_{☉}
Temperature	3,130 K
Age	3.0 Myr

Other designations
- DI Cha, HIP 54365, CD−76°486, WDS J11073-7738, AAVSO 1104-77

Database references
SIMBAD	data
- B

DI Chamaeleontis, also known as Hen 3-593 or HIP 54365, is a quadruple star system in the constellation Chamaeleon. The system is located 616 light years away from Earth based on Gaia DR3 parallax measurements.

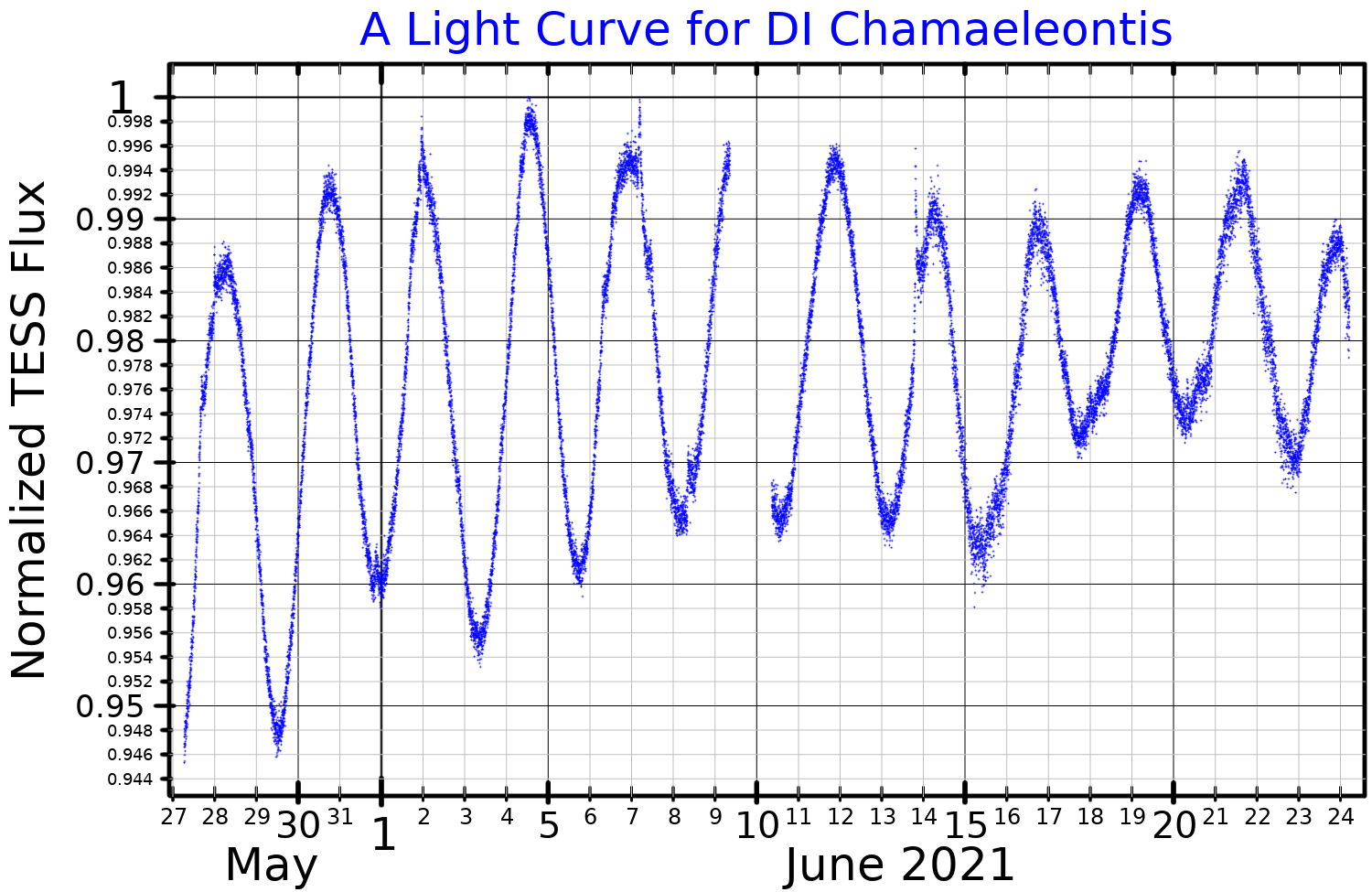
A light curve for DI Chamaeleontis, plotted from TESS data,

DI Cha is a variable star of the T Tauri type, young stellar objects just approaching the main sequence. It varies erratically between visual magnitudes 10.65 and 10.74. Although it is visually faint, it was noticed because of the prominent emission lines in its spectrum.

In 1977, DI Cha was observed to have a much fainter companion. The separation was later measured at 4.6", approximately 644 astronomical units (AU). The B component was discovered to be a pair of stars separated by only 0.066", about 10 AU, both with spectral type M5.5. Finally, the variable primary star was found to have a faint companion 0.2" (therefore ~30 AU) away, of spectral type M6.
