= HD 97048 =

Herbig Ae/Be star in the constellation Chamaleon

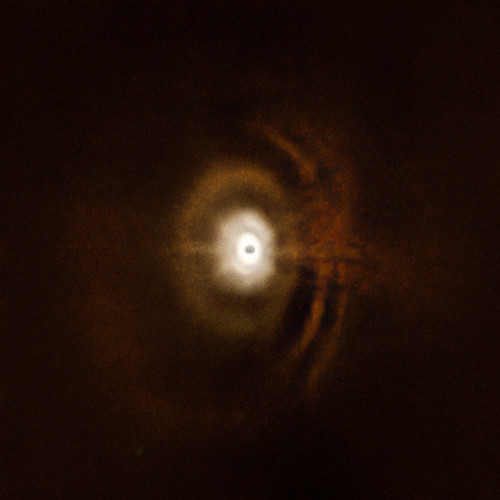
- The protoplanetary disk of HD 97048 imaged by SPHERE

Observation data Epoch J2000 Equinox ICRS
- Constellation: Chamaeleon
- Right ascension: 11^{h} 08^{m} 03.31097^{s}
- Declination: −77° 39′ 17.4908″
- Apparent magnitude (V): 8.38 - 8.48

Characteristics
- Evolutionary stage: Herbig Ae/Be
- Spectral type: A0Vep
- Variable type: INA

Astrometry
Radial velocity (R_{v})	+34.00±2.5 km/s
Proper motion (μ)	RA: −22.526 mas/yr Dec.: +1.291 mas/yr
Parallax (π)	5.4228±0.0249 mas
Distance	601 ± 3 ly (184.4 ± 0.8 pc)
Absolute magnitude (M_{V})	+2.47

Details
Mass	2.5 M_{☉}
Radius	1.7 R_{☉}
Luminosity	33 L_{☉}
Surface gravity (log g)	4.30 cgs
Temperature	10,500 K
Age	3 Myr

Other designations
- CD−76 488, HIP 54413, SAO 256802

Database references
SIMBAD	data
Exoplanet Archive	data

HD 97048 or CU Chamaeleontis is a Herbig Ae/Be star 603 ly away in the constellation Chamaeleon. It is a variable star embedded in a dust cloud containing a stellar nursery, and is itself surrounded by a dust disk.

HD 97048 is a young star still contracting towards the main sequence. Its brightness varies between magnitudes 8.38 and 8.48 and it is classified as an Orion variable. It was given the variable star designation CU Chamaeleontis in 1981. Its spectrum is also variable. The spectral class is usually given as A0 or B9, sometimes with a giant luminosity class, sometimes main sequence. The spectrum shows strong variable emission lines indicative of a shell surrounding the star.

HD 97048 is a member of the Chamaeleon T1 stellar association and is still embedded within the dark molecular cloud that it is forming from. It illuminates a small reflection nebula against the dark cloud.

== Planetary system ==
This star has a substantial dust disk having a central cavity with a 40−46 AU radius The disk has a carbon monoxide gas velocity kink and intensity gap at 130 AUs, which is suspected to be caused by a superjovian planet. In 2019, HCO^{+} ion and Hydrogen cyanide emission was detected from the disk, suggesting a large amount of gas is orbiting beyond 200 AU radius.

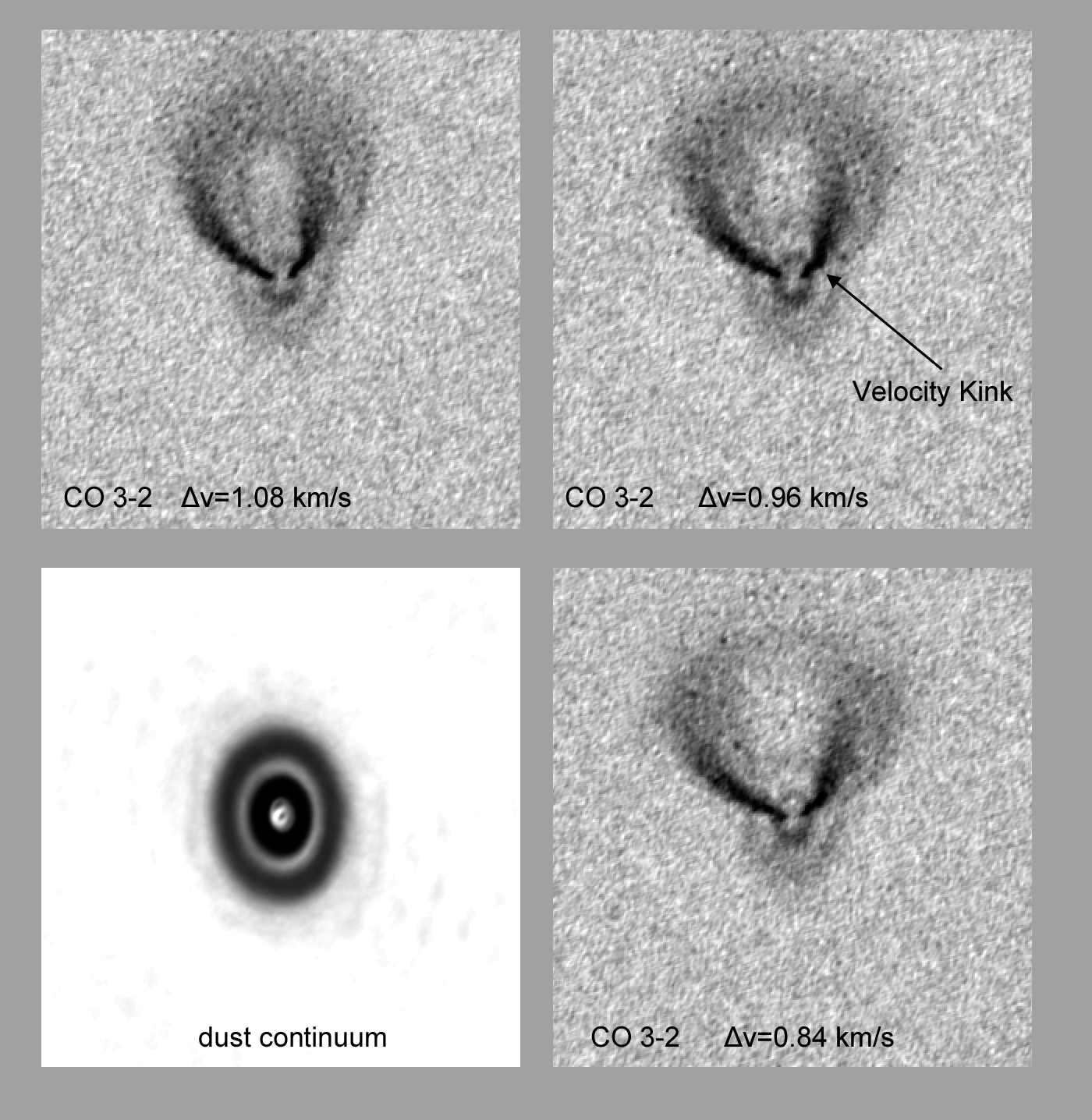
Velocity kink for the CO gas and gap in the disk, showing the presence of a protoplanet

In the system a kink in the velocity of carbon monoxide gas (CO 3–2) as well as a gap in the dust emission of the disk are seen as evidence for a jovian protoplanet. The protoplanet is located at 130 au from the star and has a mass of about 2.5 Jupiter masses. It is one of the lowest mass protoplanets discovered as of 2023.

The HD 97048 planetary system
Companion (in order from star)	Mass	Semimajor axis (AU)	Orbital period (years)	Eccentricity	Inclination (°)	Radius
protoplanetary disk	40–850 AU				40°	—
b	2.5±0.5 M_{J}	130	—	—	40	—
