= TW Hydrae association =

Star cluster

The TW Hydrae association is a group of very young low-mass stars and substellar objects located approximately 25–75 parsecs (80–240 light years) from Earth. They share a common motion and appear to all be roughly the same age, 10±3 million years old. It is the youngest such association within 100 pc from Earth.

As of 2017, 42 objects (in 23 systems) are assigned to the association confidently, and several dozens — uncertainly. Masses of its known members vary from 5 Jupiter masses to 2 solar masses, and their spectral types vary from A0 to L7.

Some of the best studied members of this stellar association are TW Hydrae (nearest known accreting T Tauri star to the Earth), HR 4796 (an A-type star with resolved dusty debris disk; the most massive known group member), HD 98800 (a quadruple star system with debris disk), and 2M1207 (accreting brown dwarf with remarkable planetary-mass companion 2M1207b).

Included in the association is WISEA 1147, which is a brown dwarf.

== See also ==
- List of nearby stellar associations and moving groups
- β Pictoris moving group
- AB Doradus moving group
- Scorpius–Centaurus association
