= HD 98800 =

Quadruple star system in the constellation of Crater

Observation data Epoch J2000 Equinox ICRS
- Constellation: Crater
- HD 98800 A
- Right ascension: 11^{h} 22^{m} 05.287^{s}
- Declination: −24° 46′ 39.78″
- Apparent magnitude (V): 9.59
- HD 98800 B
- Right ascension: 11^{h} 22^{m} 05.288^{s}
- Declination: −24° 46′ 39.05″
- Apparent magnitude (V): 10.06 (10.4 / 11.5)‍

Characteristics

HD 98800 A
- Spectral type: K5V / ?
- B−V color index: 1.17 / ?

HD 98800 B
- Spectral type: K7V / M1V
- B−V color index: 1.37 / 1.41
- Variable type: T Tau / RS CVn?

Astrometry
Proper motion (μ)	RA: −85.40 mas/yr Dec.: −33.10 mas/yr
Parallax (π)	21.90±0.35 mas
Distance	149 ± 2 ly (45.7 ± 0.7 pc)
Absolute magnitude (M_{V})	6.06 (Aa); 6.91±0.26; 8.02±0.27

Orbit
Primary	HD 98800 A
Secondary	HD 98800 B
Period (P)	212±11 yr 237±12 yr
Semi-major axis (a)	1.067±0.046"; 1.172±0.044" (48.8±1.9 au 52.6±2.0 au)
Eccentricity (e)	0.437±0.014; 0.460±0.015
Inclination (i)	87.850±0.082° 88.074±0.064°
Longitude of the node (Ω)	184.47±0.10° 184.639±0.095°
Periastron epoch (T)	2024.11±0.79; 2021.63±0.65
Argument of periastron (ω) (secondary)	69.1±3.5° 58.8±2.6°
Semi-amplitude (K_{1}) (primary)	3.86±0.23 km/s 3.78±0.20 km/s
Semi-amplitude (K_{2}) (secondary)	3.73±0.20 km/s 3.67±0.20 km/s

Orbit
Primary	HD 98800 Aa
Secondary	HD 98800 Ab
Period (P)	264.507±0.020 days
Semi-major axis (a)	(19.036±0.015)×10^{−3}" (0.870±0.016 au)
Eccentricity (e)	0.48082±0.00085
Inclination (i)	135.59±0.12°
Longitude of the node (Ω)	170.17±0.15°
Periastron epoch (T)	MJD 48,742.46±0.79
Argument of periastron (ω) (secondary)	68.7±0.1°
Semi-amplitude (K_{1}) (primary)	6.79±0.14 km/s

Orbit
Primary	HD 98800 Ba
Secondary	HD 98800 Bb
Period (P)	314.87848±0.00015 days
Semi-major axis (a)	0.02204±0.00023" (1.0064±0.0075 au)
Eccentricity (e)	0.7819±0.0049
Inclination (i)	65.43±0.31°
Longitude of the node (Ω)	344.02±0.32°
Periastron epoch (T)	MJD 48,708.7±0.2
Argument of periastron (ω) (secondary)	104.86±0.34°
Semi-amplitude (K_{1}) (primary)	22.63±0.29 km/s
Semi-amplitude (K_{2}) (secondary)	28.11±0.39 km/s

Details

HD 98800 Aa
Mass	0.956±0.059 M_{☉}
Radius	1.75 R_{☉}
Surface gravity (log g)	4.25 cgs
Temperature	4500 K
Rotational velocity (v sin i)	5.0 km/s
Age	7±5 Myr

HD 98800 Ab
Mass	0.298±0.013 M_{☉}
Age	7±5 Myr

HD 98800 Ba
Mass	0.76±0.02 M_{☉}
Radius	1.09±0.14 R_{☉}
Luminosity	0.330±0.075 L_{☉}
Surface gravity (log g)	4.21±0.12 cgs
Temperature	4,200±150 K
Rotational velocity (v sin i)	3.0 km/s

HD 98800 Bb
Mass	0.612±0.013 M_{☉}
Radius	0.85±0.11 R_{☉}
Luminosity	0.167±0.038 L_{☉}
Surface gravity (log g)	4.34±0.12 cgs
Temperature	4,000±150 K
Rotational velocity (v sin i)	0.0 km/s

Other designations
- TV Crt, CD−24°9706, GJ 2084, HD 98800, HIP 55505, SAO 179815, ADS 8141 AB, CCDM J11221-2447AB

Database references
SIMBAD	HD 98800
- HD 98800A
- HD 98800B
ARICNS	HD 98800A
- HD 98800B

HD 98800, also catalogued as TV Crateris (TV Crt), is a quadruple star system in the constellation of Crater (the cup). Parallax measurements made by the Hipparcos spacecraft put it at a distance of about 150 light-years (45 parsecs) away. The system is located within the TW Hydrae association (TWA), and has received the designation TWA 4.

The system consists of HD 98800 A and HD 98800 B each of which contains two stars. In 2007, a debris disk was discovered orbiting HD 98800 B consisting of two rings which indicates there may be an extrasolar planet orbiting within a distance of 1.5 to 2 astronomical units.

== Stellar system ==
The system is a member of the TW Hydrae association, a group of young stars. Its membership was derived from the fact that its proper motion is similar to other stars in the group. The system itself is estimated to be around 7-10 million years old.

HD 98800 is a quadruple system, with two pairs of stars orbiting each other. The two pairs are separated by over an arcsecond, so the wide visual orbit is poorly known. A preliminary range of orbits has been calculated, with an orbital period of 300 to 430 years, as well as a moderate eccentricity of 0.3 to 0.6.

The primary component, HD 98800 A, is a K-type main-sequence star with a varying radial velocity. This indicates the presence of another star orbiting it, but light from that star cannot be detected, so the system is a single-lined spectroscopic binary. The secondary system, HD 98800 B, is another spectroscopic binary, but double-lined since both stars (another K-type star and a red dwarf) can be directly detected. The stars in the HD 98800 are much larger than would be expected from their masses: at such a young age, these stars have not condensed into their normal size yet.

== Variability ==
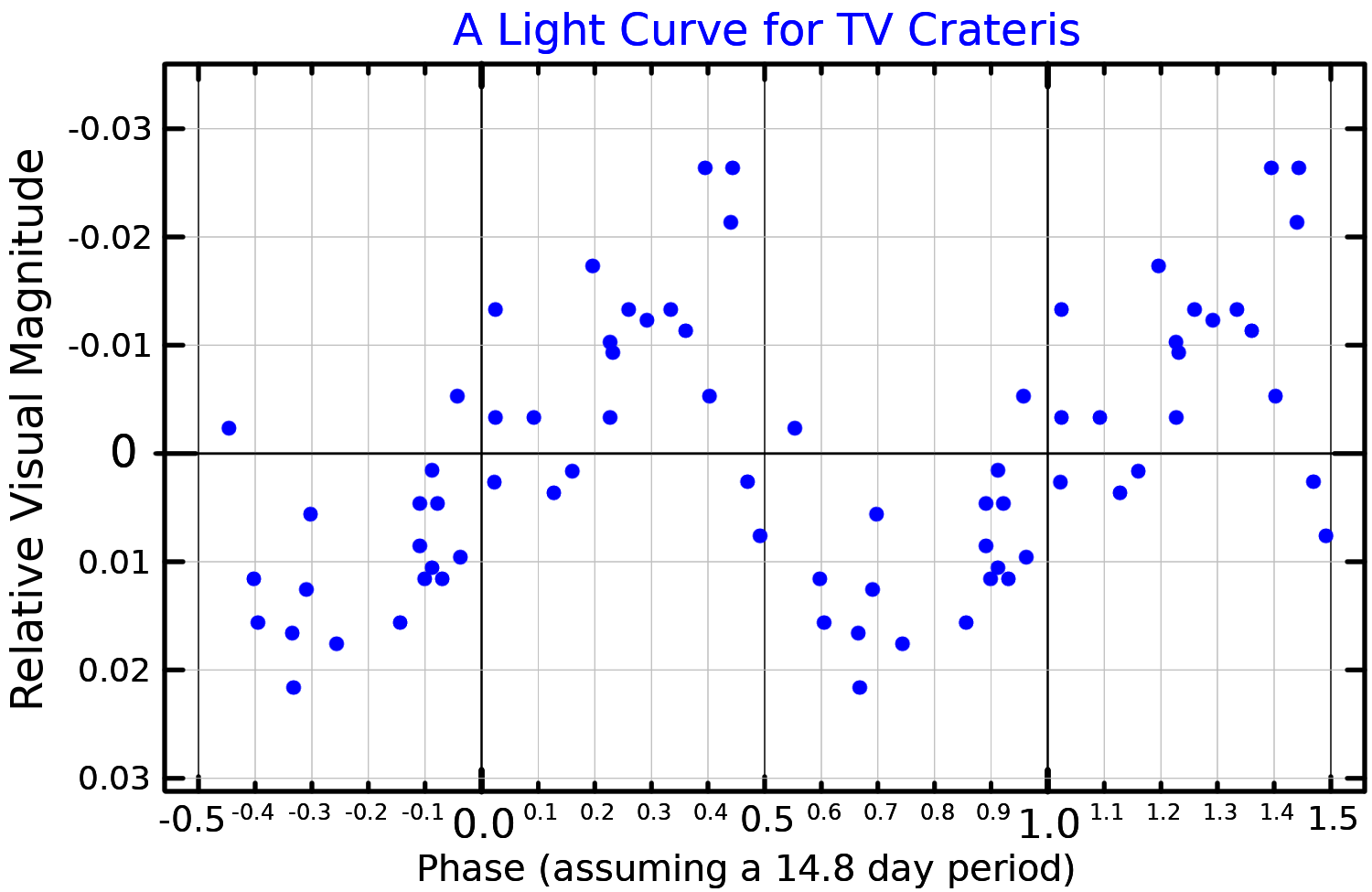
A visual band light curve for TV Crateris, adapted from Henry et al. (1995)

The brightness of HD 98800 varies slightly between magnitudes 8.91 and 8.98, and it has been given the variable star designation TV Crateris. The designation TV Crateris includes all four stars and it appears that both components A and B are variable. Component A varies with a period of 2.521 days which is thought to be its rotation period and it is classified as an RS Canum Venaticorum variable, a dwarf star with an uneven surface brightness that changes brightness as it rotates. Component B is thought to be a T Tauri star, a pre-main-sequence star surrounded by a disk. It has been speculated that it is actually a post-T Tauri star and that the variations are caused by irregularities in the tilted disk intercepting the light from the star.

== Planetary system ==
=== Debris disk ===
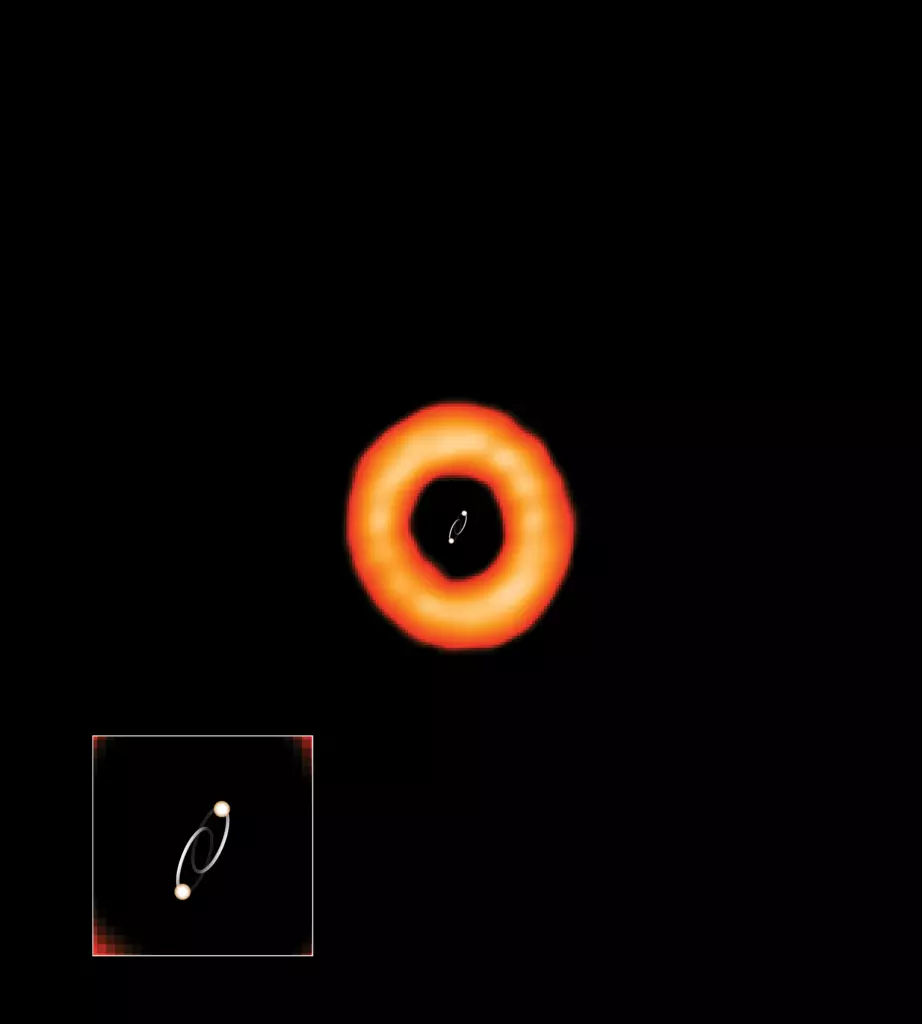
An image of the debris disk around HD 98800 B by ALMA. The disk is misaligned with the orbital plane of the inner binary.

An infrared excess indicative of a debris disk was first discovered by IRAS. Further observations of the system have been made using Keck and the Spitzer Space Telescope. The disk consists of two separate belts. The inner ring extends from a distance of 1.5 to 2 astronomical units from the barycenter of the central binary. The outer ring begins at approximately 5.9 astronomical units from the central binary, and extends out an undetermined distance. The gap between the two rings is ~3 astronomical units. The inner ring is thin, while the inner portion of the outer ring is dense.

Dr. Elise Furlan, leader of the Spitzer team that imaged this disk, concludes that the dust generated from the collision of rocky objects in the outer belt should eventually migrate toward the inner disk. But because the system is a double binary system, the dust particles do not evenly fill out the inner disk as expected.

The disk was imaged with ALMA and the high resolution image showed that the disk is likely misaligned with the orbit of the inner binary. The long period of the orbiting inner binary could be responsible for this misalignment and any circumbinary planet forming in this disk would be misaligned with the orbit of the inner binary. Based on VLA observations the disk extends from 3 to 5 astronomical units. The disk is more similar to a massive gas-rich protoplanetary disks than to a debris disks, which is unusual for this kind of age of a circumbinary disk.

=== Possible planets ===
Debris disks are thought to constitute a phase in planetary formation. Because of the gap within the debris disk, the possibility of a planet within the system becomes even more likely. The detected gap could be caused by a unique gravitational relationship between the disk and a possible planet already begun to form, carving out a clear space in the disk. However, the gap could also be gravitational resonance effects of the four stars.

== Gallery ==
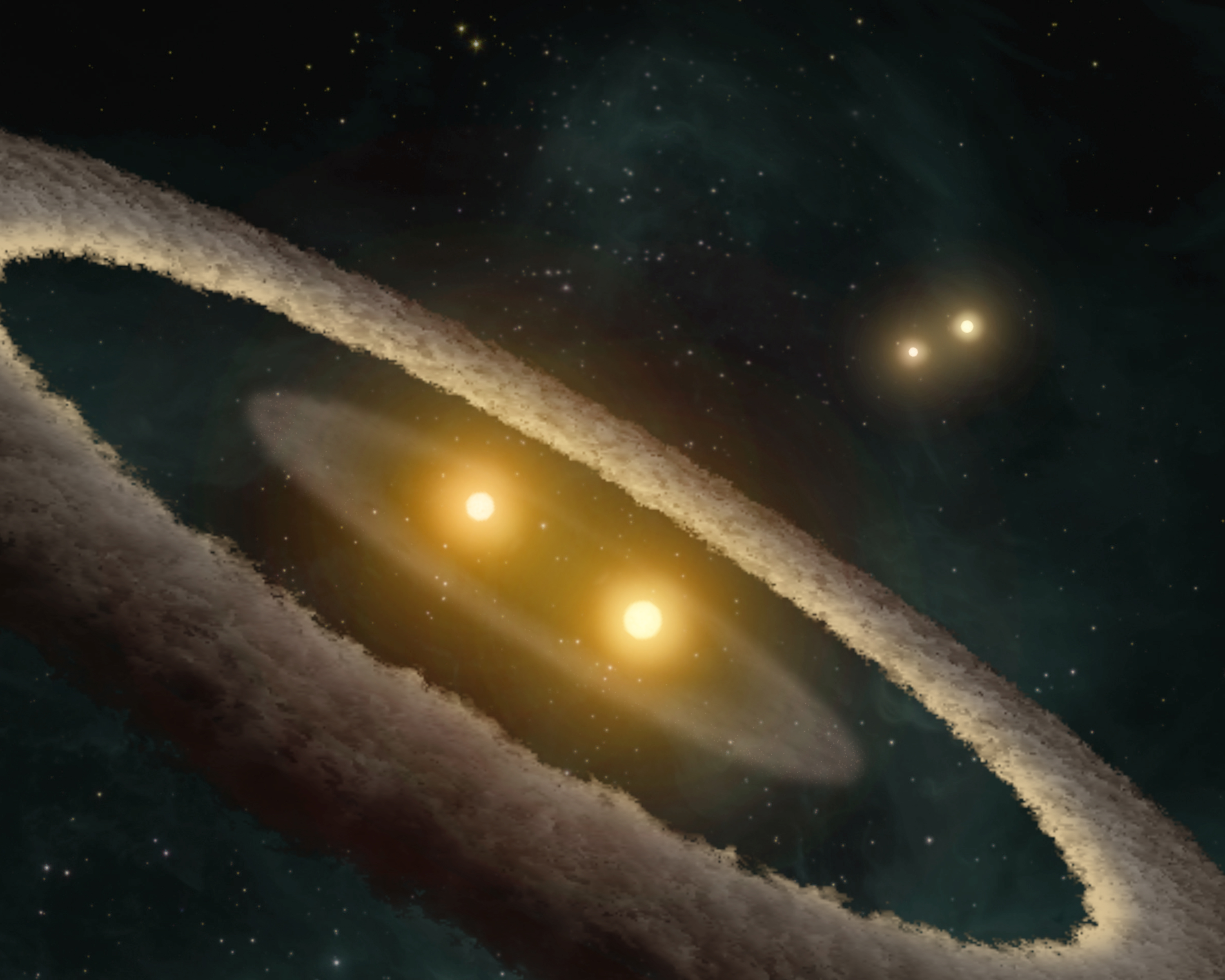
An older artist's impression of the debris disk around HD 98800 B. HD 98800 A is seen in the distance. This impression was created before it was known that the disk is misaligned.

== See also ==
- 2M1207
- HD 188753
- UX Tauri
- V4046 Sagittarii
