= WISE J1147−2040 =

Astronomical object

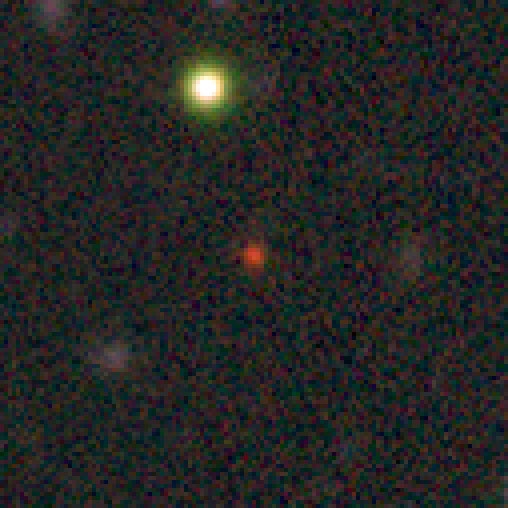
- WISE J1147−2040; Credit: legacy surveys

Observation data Epoch J2000 Equinox J2000
- Constellation: Crater
- Right ascension: 11^{h} 47^{m} 24.214^{s}
- Declination: −20° 40′ 20.44″

Characteristics
- Evolutionary stage: Brown dwarf or a rogue planet
- Spectral type: L7V

Astrometry
Distance	102±12 ly (31.3±3.8 pc)

Details
Mass	5–10 M_{Jup}
Temperature	1,500±100 K 1100–1200 K
Age	7±2.5 Myr

Other designations
- WISEA 1147, 2MASS J11472421−2040204, WISEA J114724.10−204021.3

Database references
SIMBAD	data

WISEA J114724.10−204021.3 (abbreviated WISEA 1147) is a sub-brown dwarf or rogue planet in the TW Hydrae association, a nearby group of very young stars and brown dwarfs. The object is notable because its estimate mass, 6±1 times the mass of Jupiter, places it in the mass range for rogue planets. As such, it is a free-floating object, unassociated with any star system.

The object was discovered using information from NASA's WISE (Wide-field Infrared Survey Explorer) and the 2MASS (Two Micron All-Sky Survey). Researchers inferred the young age for WISEA 1147 because it is a member of a group of stars that is only 10 million years old, and they estimated its mass using evolutionary models for brown dwarf cooling.
