= Maciej Konacki =

Polish astronomer

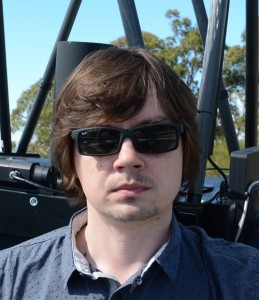

Dr. Maciej Konacki (MATCH-ee Konn-ATZ-kee) (born 1972 in Toruń, Poland) is a Polish astronomer, notable for his tentative discovery of HD 188753 Ab, a possible planet discovered in a three star system. The planet would be similar to Jupiter.

== Education ==
Konacki received a Master of Science degree in astronomy in 1996 and a Ph.D. in astronomy in 2000, all at Nicolaus Copernicus University

== Possible discovery of HD 188753 Ab ==
Dr. Konacki tentatively discovered HD 188753 Ab with the Keck I telescope on top of Mauna Kea mountain in Hawaii. The discovery was reported in the journal Nature in July 2005. A previously discovered planet around a triple star system, 16 Cygni Bb, orbits a wide system, while HD 188753 Ab, if it exists, orbits a system where the stars in the system are very close to each other. Two years later, Eggenberger et al. stated that they had made observations with the necessary precision to detect the planet, but did not detect it.

== See also ==
- Aleksander Wolszczan
