= V4046 Sagittarii =

Young binary star system in the constellation Sagittarius

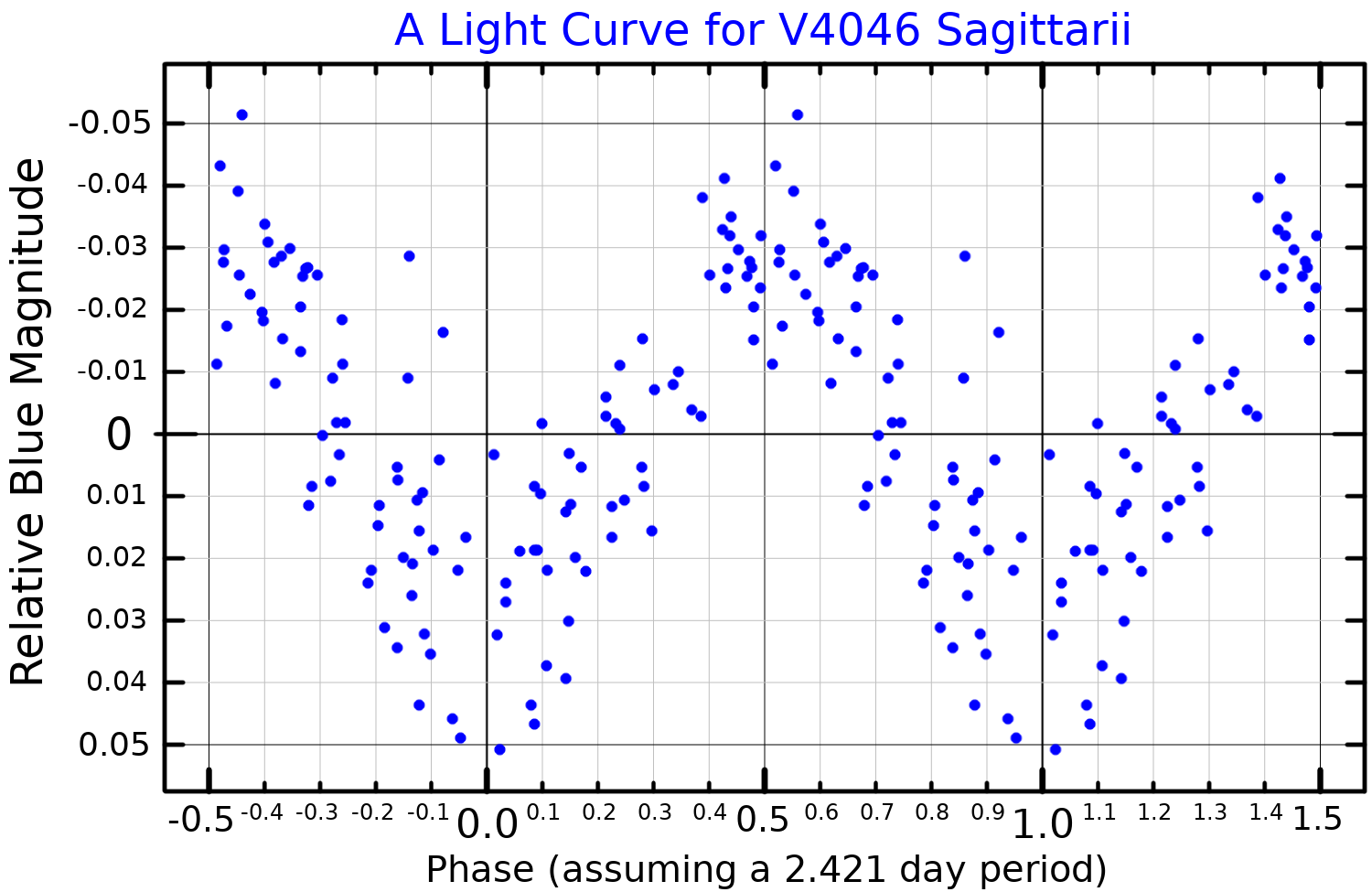
- A blue band light curve for V4046 Sagittarii, adapted from Quast et al. (2000)

Observation data Epoch J2000 Equinox ICRS
- Constellation: Sagittarius
- Right ascension: 18^{h} 14^{m} 10.4819^{s}
- Declination: −32° 47′ 34.517″
- Apparent magnitude (V): 10.68

Characteristics
- Spectral type: K5Ve / K7Ve
- Variable type: T Tauri

Astrometry
Radial velocity (R_{v})	−6.94 km/s
Proper motion (μ)	RA: +3.510 mas/yr Dec.: −52.721 mas/yr
Parallax (π)	13.9893±0.0221 mas
Distance	233.1 ± 0.4 ly (71.5 ± 0.1 pc)

Orbit
Period (P)	2.4213459 days
Semi-major axis (a)	0.041 au (8.8 R_{☉})
Eccentricity (e)	≤0.01
Inclination (i)	33.5+0.7 −1.4°
Periastron epoch (T)	JD 2,452,380.867±0.03
Semi-amplitude (K_{1}) (primary)	51.4±0.2 km/s
Semi-amplitude (K_{2}) (secondary)	54.3±0.2 km/s

Details

V4046 Sgr A
Mass	0.90±0.05 M_{☉}
Radius	1.25±0.04 R_{☉}
Luminosity	0.35±0.10 L_{☉}
Surface gravity (log g)	4.20±0.02 cgs
Temperature	4,350±240 K
Rotational velocity (v sin i)	13.5±0.5 km/s
Age	13+8 −3 Myr

V4046 Sgr B
Mass	0.85±0.04 M_{☉}
Radius	1.21±0.04 R_{☉}
Luminosity	0.25±0.08 L_{☉}
Surface gravity (log g)	4.20±0.02 cgs
Temperature	4,060±210 K
Rotational velocity (v sin i)	12.5±0.5 km/s
Age	13+8 −3 Myr

Other designations
- HD 319139, CD−32° 13906, GSC 07396-00644

Database references
SIMBAD	data

V4046 Sagittarii is a young binary consisting of two K-type main-sequence stars. The two stars are about 233.1 light-years (71.5 pc) away from the Earth. The two stars orbit each other every 2.42 days on a circular orbit.

In 1976, Ivo C. Busko and Carlos Alberto Oliveira Torres announced that the star, then known as HD 319139, is a variable star. It was given its variable star designation, V4046 Sagittarii, in 1981. It is both a classical T Tauri star, and a star showing periodic variability due to starspots.

V4046 Sagittarii is surrounded by a massive protoplanetary disk. The disk has a radius of about 370 astronomical units (au) with about 40 Earth masses of dust in the disk. There are two bright inner rings at 14 and 25 au from the center, respectively. V4046 Sagittarii is one of four pre-main-sequence star systems within 100 parsecs with protoplanetary disks, the others being TW Hydrae, HD 141569, and 49 Ceti. The two stars are still accreting matter from the disk, and gas giant planets may be forming in the disk as well.

Image of the disk around the red dwarf GSC 07396-00759 from the REASONS survey

The red dwarf GSC 07396-00759 is separated about 2.82″ from V4046 Sagittarii. Since it has a similar motion throughout space with V4046 Sagittarii, GSC 07396-00759 is assumed to be gravitationally bound (although weakly) to V4046 Sagittarii. The two systems are separated by at least 12,350 astronomical units (0.1953 ly) away, and the orbital period would be on the order of 100,000 years. GSC 07396-00759 itself has an edge-on debris disk with a radius of 70 au, and may be a binary as well, making V4046 Sagittarii a potentially quadruple system.

== See also ==
- UX Tauri
- HD 98800
- T Tauri
