= Moving-cluster method =

In astrometry, the moving-cluster method and the closely related convergent point method are means, primarily of historical interest, for determining the distance to star clusters. They were used on several nearby clusters in the first half of the 1900s to determine distance. The moving-cluster method is now largely superseded by other, usually more accurate distance measures.

== Introduction ==
The moving-cluster method relies on observing the proper motions and Doppler shift of each member of a group of stars known to form a cluster. The idea is that since all the stars share a common space velocity, they will appear to move towards a point of common convergence ("vanishing point") on the sky. This is essentially a perspective effect.

Using the moving-cluster method, the distance to a given star cluster (in parsecs) can be determined using the following equation:

$$\mathrm{distance} = \mathrm{tan}(\theta) \frac {\mathrm{v}} {\mathrm{\mu}}$$

where "θ" is the angle between the star and the cluster's apparent convergence point, "μ" is the proper motion of the cluster (in arcsec/year), and "v" is the star's radial velocity (in AU/year).

== Usage ==
The method has only ever been used for a small number of clusters. This is because for the method to work, the cluster must be quite close to Earth (within a few hundred parsecs), and also be fairly tightly bound so it can be made out on the sky. Also, the method is quite difficult to work with compared with more straightforward methods like trigonometric parallax. Finally, the uncertainty in the final distance values are in general fairly large compared those obtained with precision measurements like those from Hipparcos.

Of the clusters it has been used with, certainly the most famous are the Hyades and the Pleiades. The moving-cluster method was in fact the only way astronomers had to measure the distance to these clusters with any precision for some time in the early 20th century.

Because of the problems outlined above, this method has not been used practically for stars for several decades in astronomical research.

However, recently it has been used to estimate the distance between the brown dwarf 2M1207 and its observed exoplanet 2M1207b. In December 2005, American astronomer Eric Mamajek reported a distance (53 ± 6 parsecs) to 2M1207b using the moving-cluster method.

== See also ==
- Astrometry
- Parallax
- Parallax in astronomy
- Stellar parallax
- Cepheid Stars
- RR Lyrae Variable Stars
