= TIC 168789840 =

Sextuple star in the constellation Eridanus

- Location of TIC 168789840 (red circle)

Observation data Epoch J2000 Equinox ICRS
- Constellation: Eridanus
- Right ascension: 04^{h} 14^{m} 04.867^{s}
- Declination: −31° 55′ 22.36″
- Apparent magnitude (V): 11.51

Astrometry
Proper motion (μ)	RA: 12.082 mas/yr Dec.: 9.513 mas/yr
Parallax (π)	1.6861±0.4296 mas
Distance	1900±225 ly (584±70 pc)

Orbit
Primary	AC
Secondary	B
Period (P)	≈2000 yr

Orbit
Primary	A
Secondary	C
Period (P)	3.7±0.6 yr
Semi-major axis (a)	7" (4 AU)
Eccentricity (e)	0.28±0.05
Inclination (i)	42°
Periastron epoch (T)	2457662±305
Argument of periastron (ω) (secondary)	166.0±25.2°

Orbit
Primary	A1
Period (P)	1.570013 d
Semi-major axis (a)	6.9 R_{☉}
Inclination (i)	89.6±0.4°
Semi-amplitude (K_{1}) (primary)	70.7 km/s
Semi-amplitude (K_{2}) (secondary)	153.1 km/s

Orbit
Primary	B1
Period (P)	8.217111 d
Semi-major axis (a)	21.4 R_{☉}
Inclination (i)	88.1±0.3°
Semi-amplitude (K_{1}) (primary)	44.4 km/s
Semi-amplitude (K_{2}) (secondary)	87.1 km/s

Orbit
Primary	C1
Period (P)	1.305883 d
Semi-major axis (a)	6.1 R_{☉}
Inclination (i)	75.9±0.1°
Semi-amplitude (K_{1}) (primary)	75.4 km/s
Semi-amplitude (K_{2}) (secondary)	154.3 km/s

Details

System
Age	3.160±0.624 Gyr

A1
Mass	1.25±0.05 M_{☉}
Radius	1.49±0.07 R_{☉}
Luminosity	3.39 L_{☉}
Surface gravity (log g)	4.18 cgs
Temperature	6,400±125 K
Rotational velocity (v sin i)	48.5 km/s

A2
Mass	0.56±0.04 M_{☉}
Radius	0.52±0.04 R_{☉}
Luminosity	0.07 L_{☉}
Surface gravity (log g)	4.73 cgs
Temperature	3,923±100 K
Rotational velocity (v sin i)	17.5 km/s

B1
Mass	1.30±0.08 M_{☉}
Radius	1.69±0.22 R_{☉}
Luminosity	3.95 L_{☉}
Surface gravity (log g)	4.12 cgs
Temperature	6,365±170 K
Rotational velocity (v sin i)	10.1 km/s

B2
Mass	0.66±0.03 M_{☉}
Radius	0.62±0.02 R_{☉}
Luminosity	0.12 L_{☉}
Surface gravity (log g)	4.67 cgs
Temperature	4,290±110 K
Rotational velocity (v sin i)	3.8 km/s

C1
Mass	1.23±0.10 M_{☉}
Radius	1.45±0.28 R_{☉}
Luminosity	2.74 L_{☉}
Surface gravity (log g)	4.24 cgs
Temperature	6,350±160 K
Rotational velocity (v sin i)	51.5 km/s

C2
Mass	0.59±0.07 M_{☉}
Radius	0.56±0.07 R_{☉}
Luminosity	0.07 L_{☉}
Surface gravity (log g)	4.72 cgs
Temperature	3,889±190 K
Rotational velocity (v sin i)	20.9 km/s

Other designations
- 2MASS J04140483-3155223, GSC 07037-00089, TYC 7037-89-1, RAVE J041404.8-315523, Gaia DR2 4882954370431549824

Database references
SIMBAD	data

TIC 168789840, also known as TYC 7037-89-1, is a stellar system with six stars. Three pairs of binary stars circle a common barycenter. While other systems with three pairs of stars have been discovered, this was the first system where the stars can be observed eclipsing one another, as the Earth lies approximately on their planes of rotation.

== Discovery ==
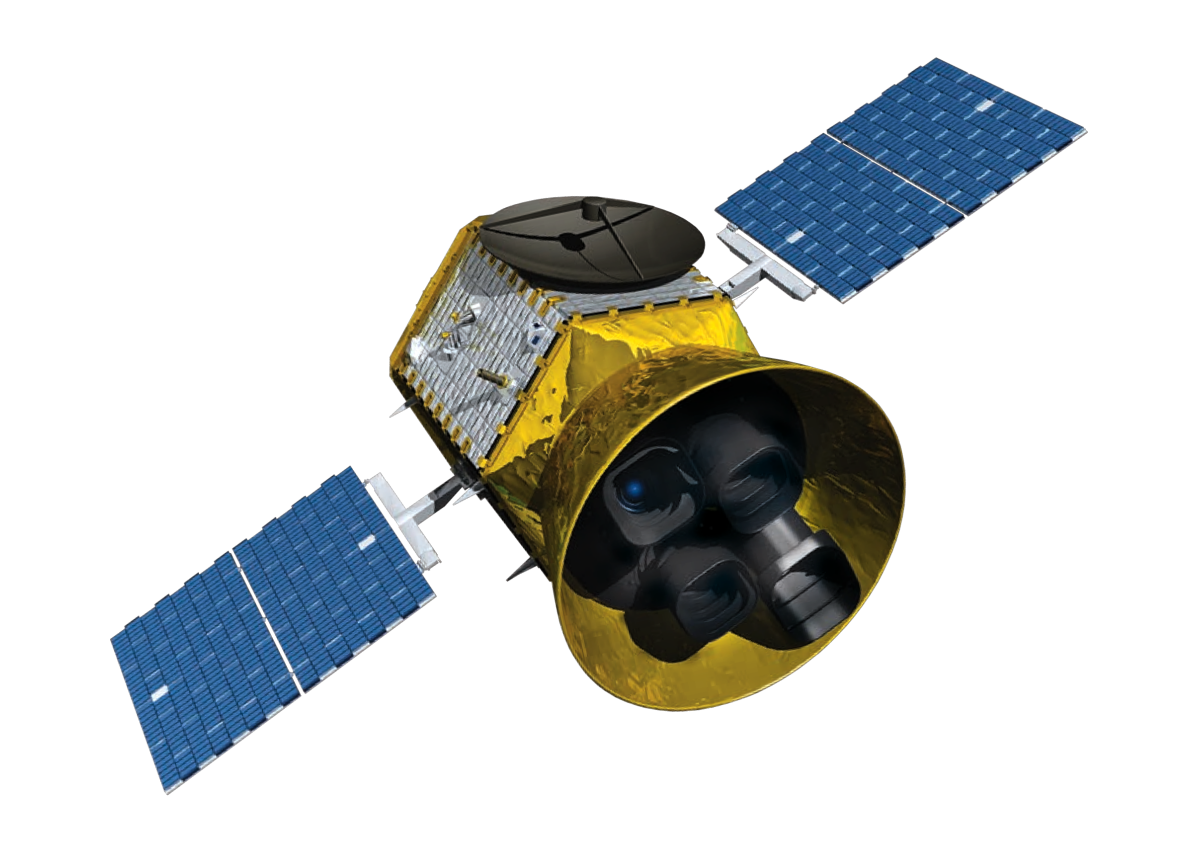
Astronomers used the orbiting TESS telescope to determine TIC 168789840 was lined up so all six stars' eclipses could be observed.

The Transiting Exoplanet Survey Satellite identified that the star system consisted of six eclipsing stars. The discovery was announced in January 2021. It is approximately 1,900 light-years (584 pc) from Earth, in the constellation Eridanus, west of the river asterism's sharpest bend, Upsilon2 Eridani, often called Theemin. To be seen the group needs strong magnification from Earth as is much fainter than red clump giant star Theemin and is about nine times further away.

== Orbits ==
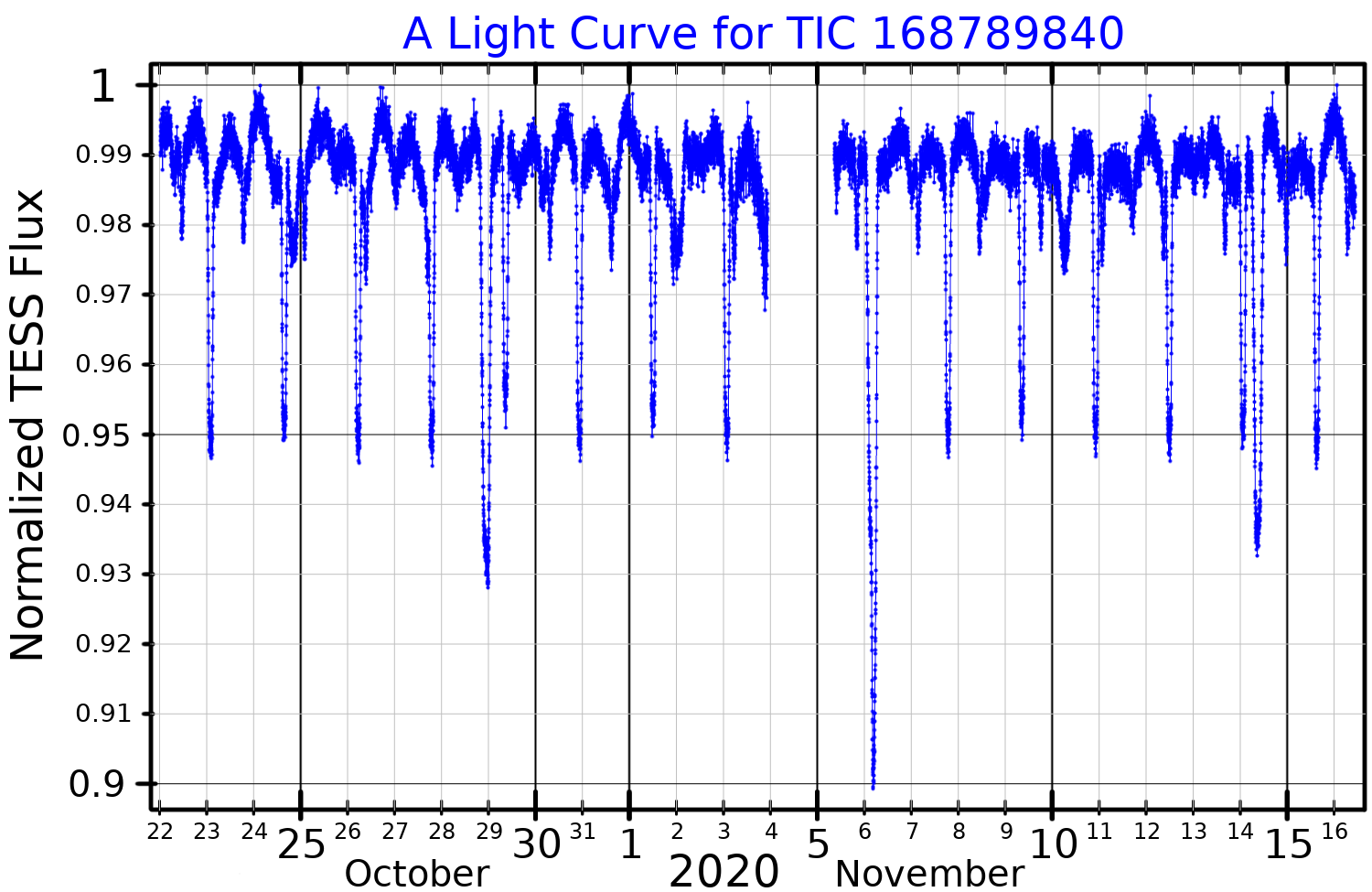
A light curve for TIC 168789840, plotted from TESS data

Two sets of the binaries co-orbit relatively closely, while the third pair of stars takes 2,000 years to orbit the entire system barycenter. The inner A pair and C pair orbit each other in 3.7 years. These are, as taken from the paired B stars, about 250 AU away (specifically the mean telescopic separation is 423 mas) and the three lettered pairs, as groups, have been resolved (the three gaps made out). From A pair to C pair is calculated to be 4 AU (∼7 mas) apart, which means this gap should be resolvable using speckle interferometry which has not yet been achieved.

Note, the three binaries (here close pairs) A, B, and C are resolved only as systems, the pairs being just 6.9 R_{☉} (∼0.054 mas), 21.4 R_{☉} (∼0.168 mas), and 6.1 R_{☉} (∼0.047 mas) apart, respectively.

According to Jeanette Kazmierczak of NASA's Goddard Space Flight Center:

The stars in the A and C systems orbit each other roughly every day and a half, and the two binaries orbit each other about every four years. The B binary’s members circle each other about every eight days, but the pair is much farther away, orbiting around the inner systems roughly every 2,000 years.

== Stellar characteristics ==
The primary stars of all three close binaries are slightly hotter and brighter than the Sun, while the secondary stars are much cooler and dimmer. Because the two closely bound pairs are so close, only the third, more distant pair could have planets. The primaries are all beginning to evolve away from the main sequence, while the less massive and longer-lived secondaries are all still firmly on the main sequence and fusing hydrogen in their cores.

== See also ==
- Castor (star) – the second-brightest (apparent) "star" in Gemini, likewise a (double-double)-double system
