= UX Tauri =

Binary star system in the constellation Taurus

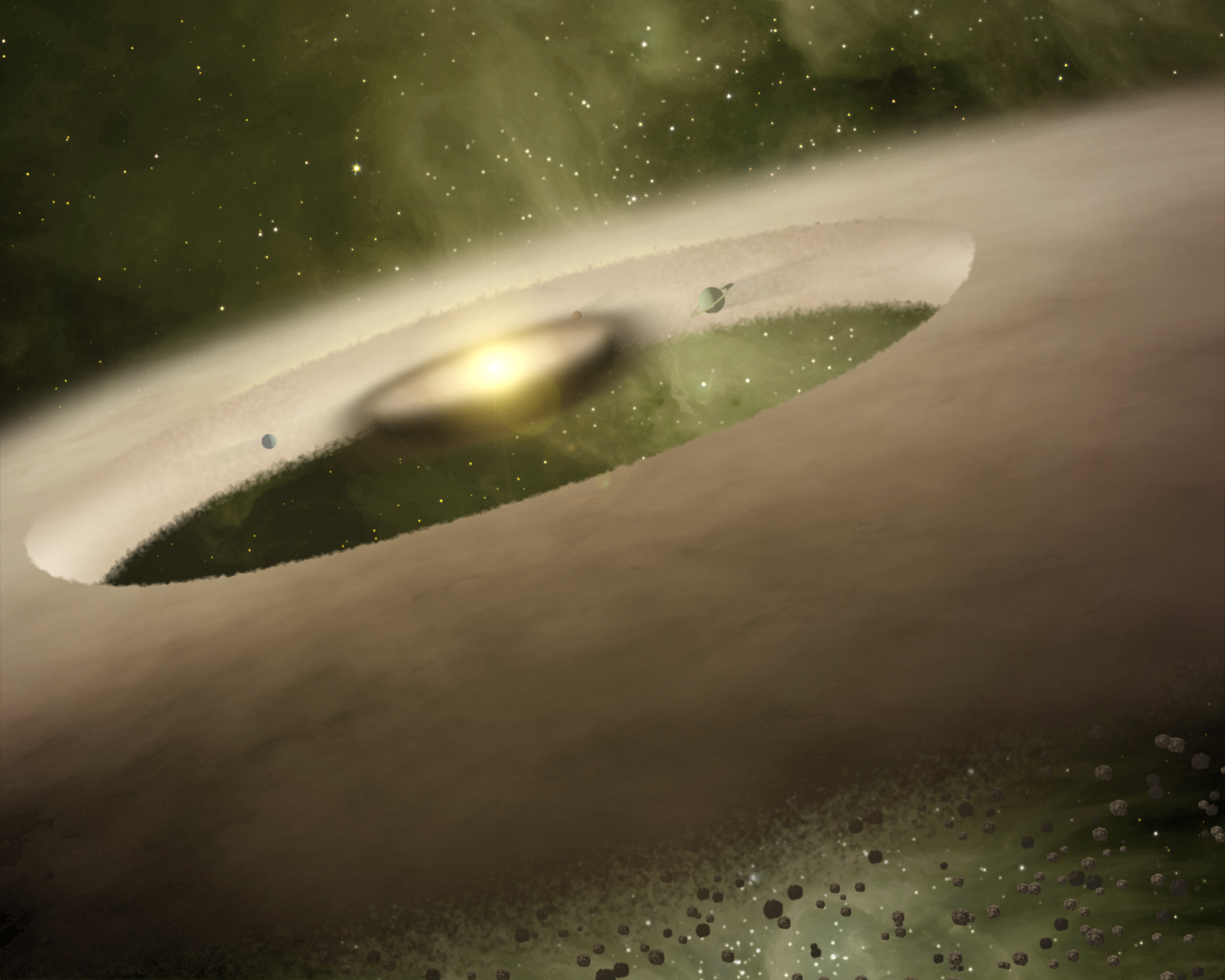
- An artist's conception of a circumstellar disk around UX Tauri A, along with several hypothetical protoplanets

Observation data Epoch J2000.0 Equinox ICRS
- Constellation: Taurus
- Right ascension: 04^{h} 30^{m} 03.99626^{s}
- Declination: +18° 13′ 49.4355″
- Apparent magnitude (V): 10.5 - 13.9

Characteristics
- Spectral type: K2Ve + M1Ve
- Variable type: T Tau

Astrometry
Radial velocity (R_{v})	22.90 km/s
Proper motion (μ)	RA: 17.18 mas/yr Dec.: -21.91 mas/yr
Parallax (π)	-3.70±5.73 mas
Distance	454.7 ± 6.5 ly (139.4±2.0 pc)

Details

UX Tauri A
Mass	2.34+0.29 −0.43 M_{☉}
Radius	3.3 (Note: Calculated, using the Stefan-Boltzmann law and the star's effective temperature and luminosity, with respect to the solar nominal effective temperature of 5,772 K: $$\sqrt{\biggl(\frac{5,772}{5,490}\biggr)^4 \cdot 10^{0.95}} = 3.3\ R_\odot.$$) R_{☉}
Luminosity	8.9+3.7 −2.5 L_{☉}
Surface gravity (log g)	3.77±0.17 cgs
Temperature	5,490+130 −210 K
Metallicity [Fe/H]	+0.02±0.02 dex
Rotation	5.0±0.9 days
Rotational velocity (v sin i)	128±12 km/s
Age	1.26+1.03 −0.63 Myr

UX Tauri B
Mass	0.4 M_{☉}
Radius	1.9 (Note: Calculated, using the Stefan-Boltzmann law and the star's effective temperature and luminosity, with respect to the solar nominal effective temperature of 5,772 K: $$\sqrt{\biggl(\frac{5,772}{3,500}\biggr)^4 \cdot 0.5} = 1.9\ R_\odot.$$) R_{☉}
Luminosity	0.5 L_{☉}
Surface gravity (log g)	3.5 cgs
Temperature	3,500 K
Age	1 Myr

Other designations
- UX Tau, HD 285846, HIP 20990, WDS J04301+1814AB, CCDM J04301+1814AB, 1RXS J043004.5+181342

Database references
SIMBAD	data

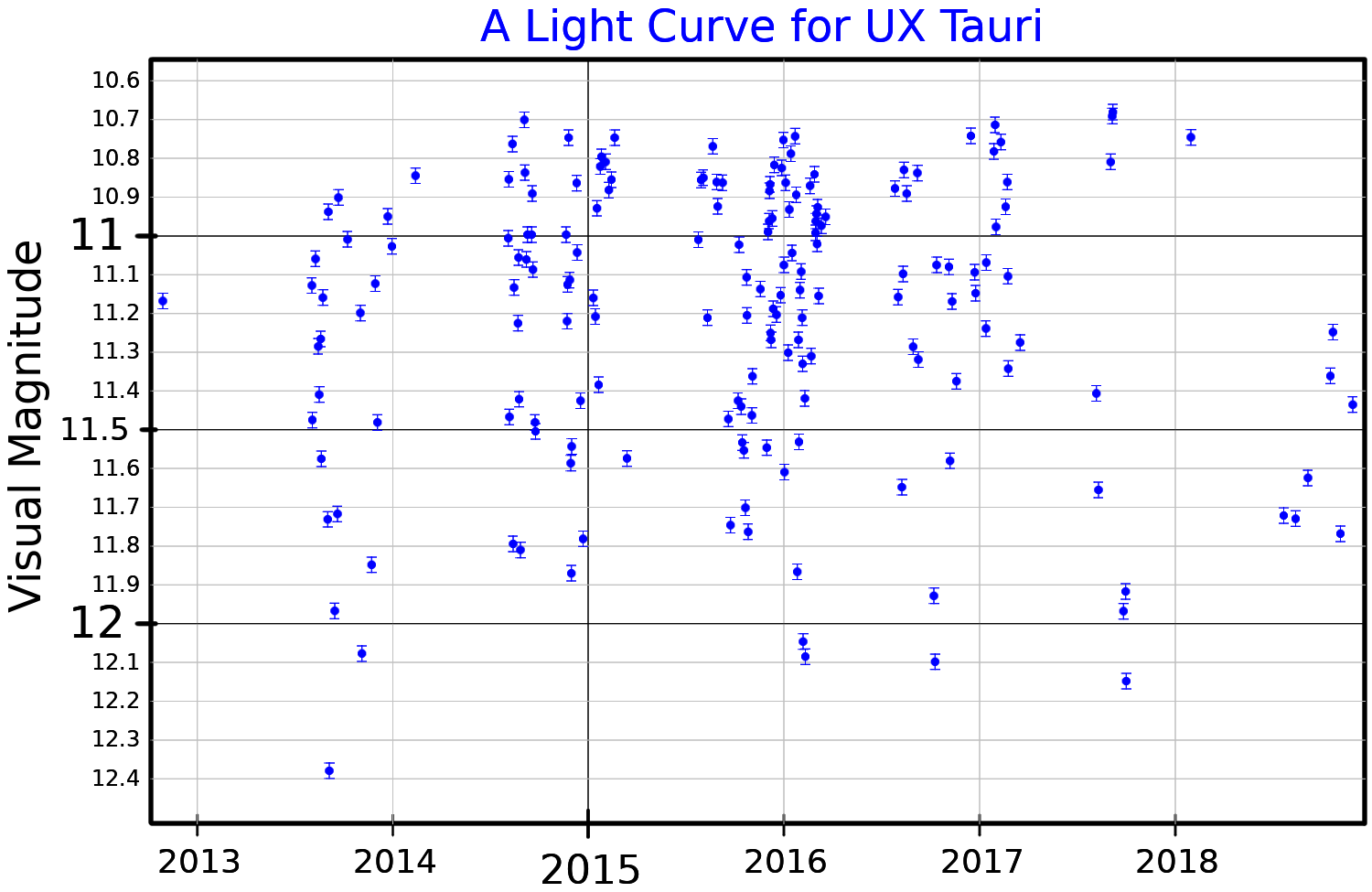
A visual-band light curve for UX Tauri, plotted from ASAS-SN data

UX Tauri, abbreviated as UX Tau, is a binary star system approximately 450 light-years away in the constellation of Taurus (the Bull). It is notable for the fact that, despite its recent (in stellar terms) creation, the Spitzer Space Telescope discovered that its protoplanetary disk contains a gap. The dust, which normally accumulates in an expanding ring starting right next to the star at such a young age, is either very thin or nonexistent at a range of 0.2 to 56 AU from the star. Typically, this means that the early ancestors of planets may be forming from the disk, though the star only ignited about 1 million years ago. In contrast, Earth was formed approximately 4.54 billion years ago, placing its formation about sixty million years after the Sun's ignition around 4.6 billion years ago.

== See also ==
- HD 98800
- Vega
- V4046 Sagittarii
