= HD 188753 =

Hierarchical triple star system in the constellation Cygnus

Observation data Epoch J2000.0 Equinox ICRS
- Constellation: Cygnus
- Right ascension: 19^{h} 54^{m} 58.37177^{s}
- Declination: +41° 52′ 17.5298″
- Apparent magnitude (V): +7.43

Characteristics
- Spectral type: A: G8V; Ba: K0V; Bb: K7V
- U−B color index: +0.42
- B−V color index: +0.79

Astrometry
Radial velocity (R_{v})	−23.5 km/s
Proper motion (μ)	RA: −51.32 mas/yr Dec.: +286.57 mas/yr
Parallax (π)	21.63±0.65 mas
Distance	151 ± 5 ly (46 ± 1 pc)
Absolute magnitude (M_{V})	4.09

Orbit
Primary	HD 188753 A
Secondary	HD 188753 B
Period (P)	25.63 yr
Semi-major axis (a)	0.2587" (11.8 au)
Eccentricity (e)	0.502
Inclination (i)	31.1°
Longitude of the node (Ω)	45.7°
Periastron epoch (T)	1988.1
Argument of periastron (ω) (secondary)	233.3°
Semi-amplitude (K_{1}) (primary)	4.8 km/s
Semi-amplitude (K_{2}) (secondary)	3.4 km/s

Orbit
Primary	Ba
Secondary	Bb
Period (P)	154.448 days
Eccentricity (e)	0.175
Inclination (i)	41±3°
Semi-amplitude (K_{1}) (primary)	13.479 km/s
Semi-amplitude (K_{2}) (secondary)	17.63 km/s

Details
Mass	A: 1.06±0.07 M_{☉} Ba: 0.96±0.05 M_{☉} Bb: 0.67±0.05 M_{☉}
Temperature	A: 5,750 K

Other designations
- BD+41 3535, HIP 98001, SAO 48968, ADS 13125, WDS J19550+4152

Database references
SIMBAD	data

HD 188753 is a hierarchical triple star system approximately 151 light-years away in the constellation of Cygnus, the Swan. In 2005, an extrasolar planet was announced to be orbiting the primary star (designated HD 188753 A) in the system. Follow-up measurements by an independent group in 2007 did not confirm the planet's existence.

== Stellar components ==
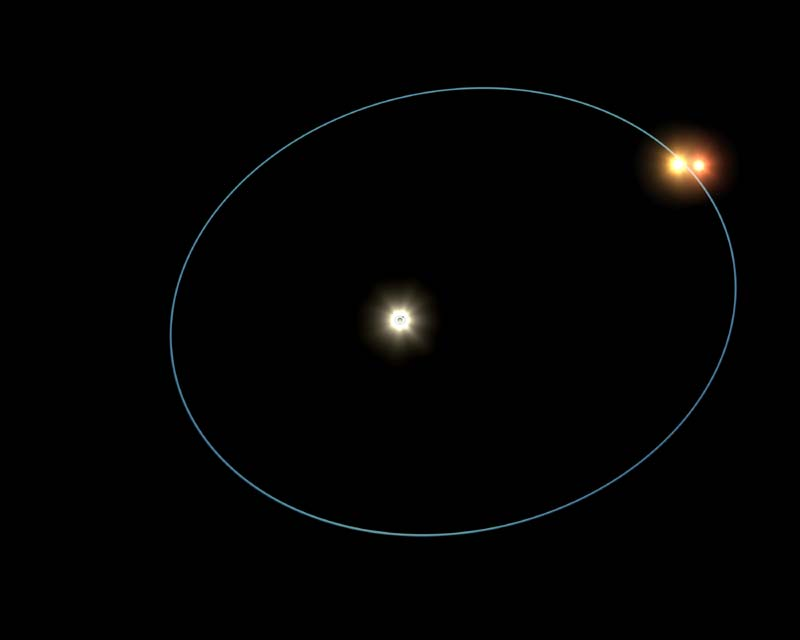
The orbit of the HD 188753B pair around A

The primary star, HD 188753 A, is similar to the Sun with a mass only 6% larger and a stellar classification of G8V. Orbiting this primary at a distance of 12.3 AU is a pair of smaller stars that orbit each other with a period of 156.0±0.1 days, a semi-major axis of 0.67 AU, and eccentricity of 0.1±0.03. The pair have estimated masses of 0.96 and 0.67 solar masses. They orbit the primary with a period of about 25.7 years and an orbital eccentricity of about 0.50. The periastron distance of this orbit is 6.2 AU.

== Possible planet ==
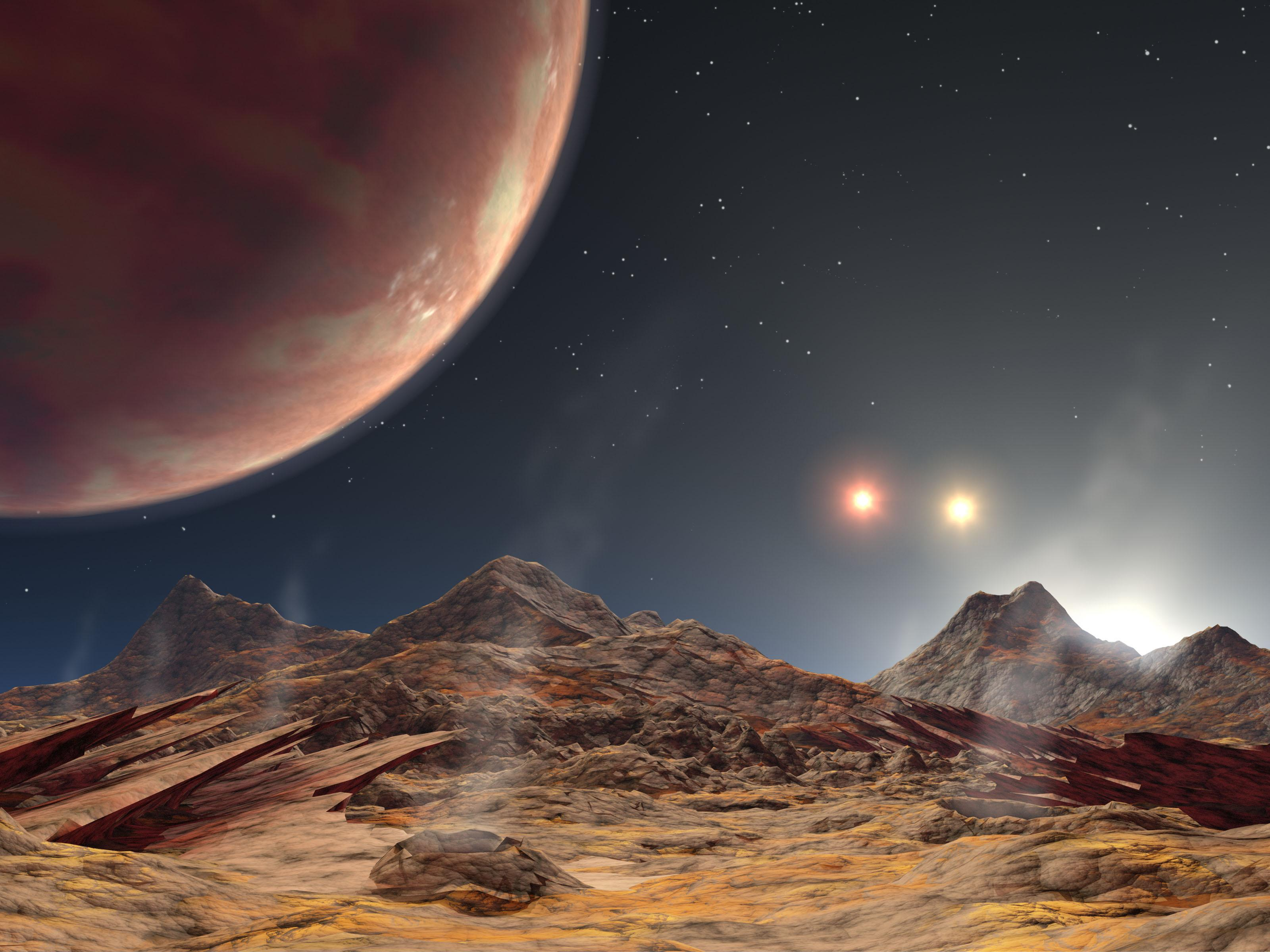
Artist's impression of the sight from a (hypothetical) moon of HD 188753 Ab (upper left). The brightest companion is just below the horizon.

In 2005 the discovery of a candidate planet orbiting the primary star of the triple star system was announced. This planet, which received the designation HD 188753 Ab, was announced by a Polish astronomer working in the United States, Dr. Maciej Konacki. This would not be the first known planet in a triple star system – for example, the planet 16 Cygni Bb had been discovered earlier, orbiting one of the components of a wide triple system also in the constellation of Cygnus.

Since HD 188753 Ab was believed to be orbiting in a multi-star system, Konacki referred to planets of this type as "Tatooine planets" after Luke Skywalker's home world. The detection of this planet has been challenged by Eggenberger et al.

The candidate planet, a hot Jupiter gas giant slightly more massive than Jupiter, was thought to orbit the star HD 188753 A once every 80 hours or so (3.3 days), at a distance of about 8 million kilometers, a twentieth of the distance between Earth and the Sun. The existence of HD 188753 Ab in a relatively close triple star system challenged the current models of planet formation. The current idea is that giant planets form in the outer reaches of their system (in orbits similar to those of Jupiter and Saturn). Once formed, some of these planets may migrate close to their stars, becoming hot Jupiters. The theoretical difficulty in understanding HD 188753 Ab is that any protoplanetary disk would have ended around 1 astronomical unit from the primary star (due to the presence of the secondary stars). A Jovian planet should not have been able to form so close to the primary, and with no disk material beyond 1 AU, a planet should not have been able to form beyond that distance to migrate inward. One of the possibilities suggested that the planet formed before the secondary stars had reached their current configuration. This suggests that the two secondary stars were once more distant than they are now.

An attempt to confirm the discovery failed. In 2007, a team at the Geneva Observatory stated that they had the precision and sampling rate sufficient to have detected the would-be planet, and that they did not detect it. Konacki responded to this, stating that the precision of the follow-up measurements was not sufficient to confirm or deny the planet's existence and that he planned to release an update in 2007. As of August 2012, no update appears to have been published.

== In popular culture ==
- In the Warhammer 40,000 universe, the "Signus Cluster" is an inhabited trinary star system located in the Northern Cross of the constellation Cygnus, apparently inspired by the HD 188753 system.

== See also ==
- 51 Pegasi
- Alpha Centauri
- Polaris
