= Star system =

Small number of stars that orbit each other

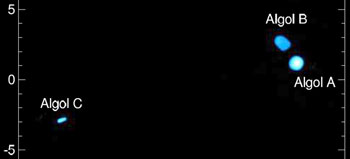
The Algol three-star system imaged in the near-infrared by the CHARA interferometer with 0.5 mas resolution in 2009. The shape of Algol C is an artifact.

Algol A is being regularly eclipsed by the dimmer Algol B every 2.87 days. (Imaged in the H-band by the CHARA interferometer. Sudden jumps in the animation are artifacts.)

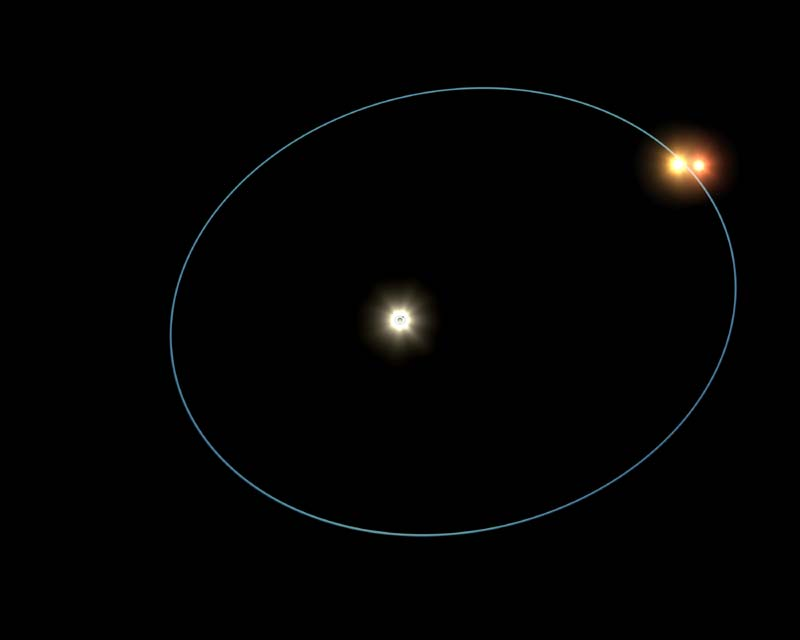
Artist's impression of the orbits of HD 188753, a triple star system.

A star system or stellar system is a small number of stars that orbit each other, bound by gravitational attraction. It may sometimes be used to refer to a single star. A large group of stars bound by gravitation is generally called a star cluster or galaxy, although, broadly speaking, they are also star systems. Star systems are not to be confused with planetary systems, which include planets and similar bodies (such as comets).

== Terminology ==
A star system of two stars is known as a binary star, binary star system or physical double star.

Systems with four or more components are rare, and are much less commonly found than those with 2 or 3. Multiple-star systems are called ternary if they contain three stars, quaternary if they contain four, etc.

These systems are smaller than open star clusters, which have more complex dynamics and typically have from 100 to 1,000 stars.

== Optical doubles and multiples ==
Binary and multiple star systems are also known as physical multiple stars, to distinguish them from optical multiple stars, which merely look close together when viewed from Earth. Multiple stars may refer to either optical or physical, but optical multiples do not form a star system.

Triple stars that are not all gravitationally bound (and thus do not form a triple star system) might comprise a physical binary and an optical companion (such as Beta Cephei) or, in rare cases, a purely optical triple star (such as Gamma Serpentis).

== Abundance ==
Research on binary and multiple stars estimates they make up about a third of the star systems in the Milky Way galaxy, with two-thirds of stars being single.

Binary stars are the most common non-single stars. With multiple star systems, the number of known systems decreases exponentially with multiplicity. For example, in the 1999 revision of Tokovinin's catalog of physical multiple stars, 551 out of the 728 systems described are triple. However, because of suspected selection effects, the ability to interpret these statistics is very limited.

== Detection ==
There are various methods to detect star systems and distinguish them from optical binaries multiples. These include:

- Make observations six months apart and look for differences caused by parallaxes. (Not feasible for distant stars.)
- Directly observe the stars orbiting each other or an apparently empty space (such as a dim star or neutron star). (Not feasible for distant stars or those with long orbital periods.)
- Observe a varying Doppler shift.
- Observe fluctuations in brightness that result from eclipses. (Relies on the Earth being in the orbital plane.)
- Observe fluctuations in brightness that result from stars reflecting each other's light or gravitationally deforming each other.

== Orbital characteristics ==
In systems that satisfy the assumptions of the two-body problem – including having negligible tidal effects, perturbations (from the gravity of other bodies), and transfer of mass between stars – the two stars will trace out a stable elliptical orbit around the barycenter of the system. Examples of binary systems are Sirius, Procyon and Cygnus X-1, the latter of which consists of a star and a black hole.

Multiple-star systems can be divided into two main dynamical classes:

- Hierarchical systems are stable and consist of nested orbits that do not interact much. Each level of the hierarchy can be treated as a two-body problem.
- Trapezia have unstable, strongly interacting orbits and are modelled as an n-body problem, exhibiting chaotic behavior. They can have 2, 3, or 4 stars.

=== Hierarchical systems ===
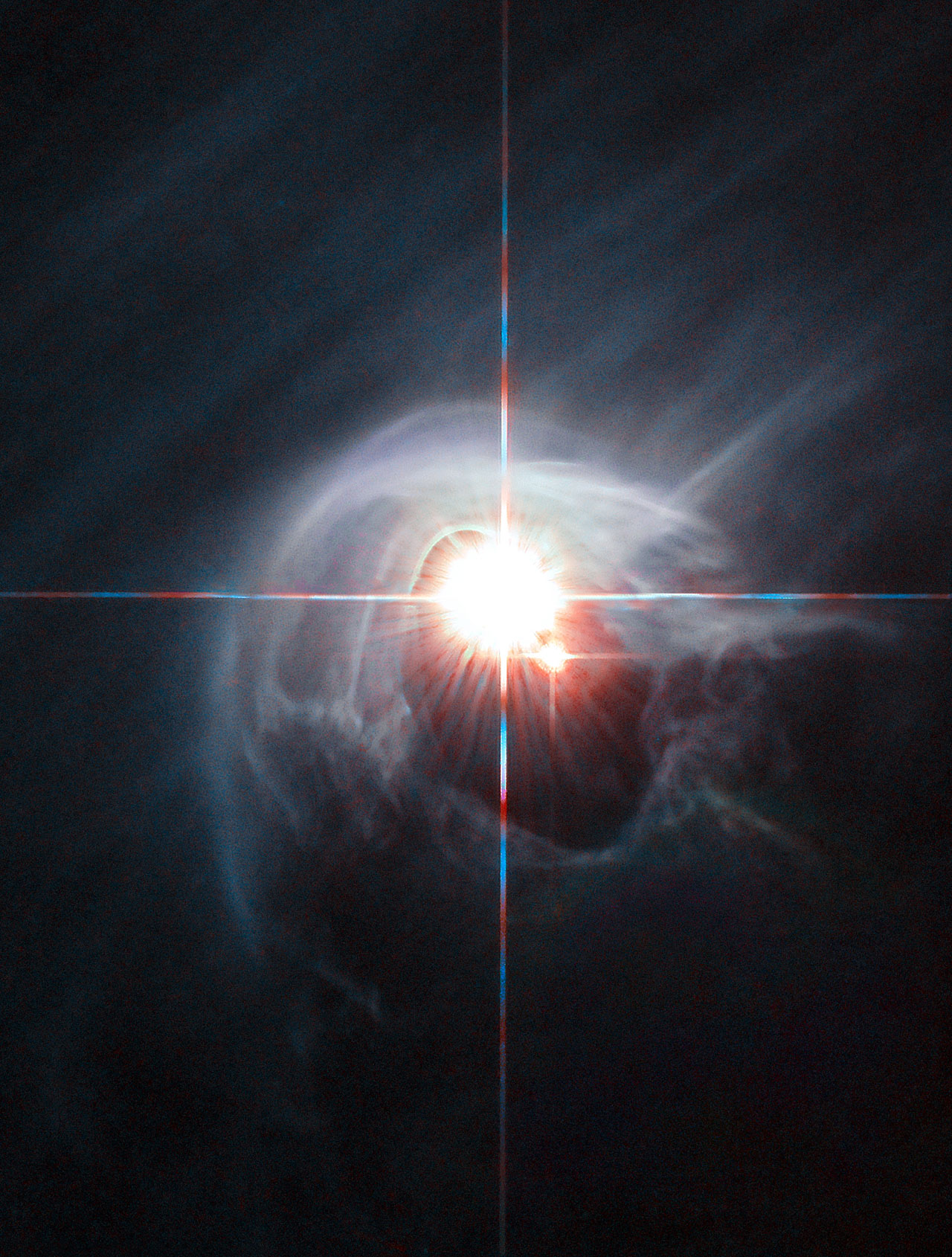
Star system named DI Cha. While only two stars are apparent, it is actually a quadruple system containing two sets of binary stars.

Most multiple-star systems are organized in what is called a hierarchical system: the stars in the system can be divided into two smaller groups, each of which traverses a larger orbit around the system's center of mass. Each of these smaller groups must also be hierarchical, which means that they must be divided into smaller subgroups which themselves are hierarchical, and so on. Each level of the hierarchy can be treated as a two-body problem by considering close pairs as if they were a single star. In these systems there is little interaction between the orbits and the stars' motion will continue to approximate stable Keplerian orbits around the system's center of mass.

For example, stable trinary systems consist of two stars in a close binary system, with a third orbiting this pair at a distance much larger than that of the binary orbit. If the inner and outer orbits are comparable in size, the system may become dynamically unstable, leading to a star being ejected from the system. EZ Aquarii is an example of a physical hierarchical triple system, which has an outer star orbiting an inner binary composed of two more red dwarf stars.

==== Mobile diagrams ====
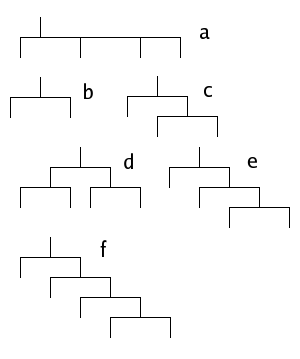
Mobile diagrams: 1. multiplex; 2. simplex, binary system; 3. simplex, triple system, hierarchy 2; 4. simplex, quadruple system, hierarchy 2; 5. simplex, quadruple system, hierarchy 3; 6. simplex, quintuple system, hierarchy 4.

Hierarchical arrangements can be organized by what Evans (1968) called mobile diagrams, which look similar to ornamental mobiles hung from the ceiling. Each level of the mobile illustrates the decomposition of the system into two or more systems with smaller size. Evans calls a diagram multiplex if there is a node with more than two children, i.e. if the decomposition of some subsystem involves two or more orbits with comparable size. Because multiplexes may be unstable, multiple stars are expected to be simplex, meaning that at each level there are exactly two children. Evans calls the number of levels in the diagram its hierarchy.

- A simplex diagram of hierarchy 1, as in (b), describes a binary system.
- A simplex diagram of hierarchy 2 may describe a triple system, as in (c), or a quadruple system, as in (d).
- A simplex diagram of hierarchy 3 may describe a system with anywhere from four to eight components. The mobile diagram in (e) shows an example of a quadruple system with hierarchy 3, consisting of a single distant component orbiting a close binary system, with one of the components of the close binary being an even closer binary.
- A real example of a system with hierarchy 3 is Castor, also known as Alpha Geminorum or α Gem. It consists of what appears to be a visual binary star which, upon closer inspection, can be seen to consist of two spectroscopic binary stars. By itself, this would be a quadruple hierarchy 2 system as in (d), but it is orbited by a fainter more distant component, which is also a close red dwarf binary. This forms a sextuple system of hierarchy 3.
- The maximum hierarchy occurring in A. A. Tokovinin's Multiple Star Catalogue, as of 1999, is 4. For example, the stars Gliese 644A and Gliese 644B form what appears to be a close visual binary star; because Gliese 644B is a spectroscopic binary, this is actually a triple system. The triple system has the more distant visual companion Gliese 643 and the still more distant visual companion Gliese 644C, which, because of their common motion with Gliese 644AB, are thought to be gravitationally bound to the triple system. This forms a quintuple system whose mobile diagram would be the diagram of level 4 appearing in (f).

Higher hierarchies are also possible. Most of these higher hierarchies either are stable or suffer from internal perturbations. Others consider complex multiple stars will in time theoretically disintegrate into less complex multiple stars, like more common observed triples or quadruples.

=== Trapezia ===
Trapezia are usually very young, unstable systems. These are thought to form in stellar nurseries, and quickly fragment into stable multiple stars, which in the process may eject components as galactic high-velocity stars. They are named after the multiple star system known as the Trapezium Cluster in the heart of the Orion Nebula. Such systems are not rare, and commonly appear close to or within bright nebulae. These stars have no standard hierarchical arrangements, but compete for stable orbits. This relationship is called interplay. Such stars eventually settle down to a close binary with a distant companion, with the other star(s) previously in the system ejected into interstellar space at high velocities. This dynamic may explain the runaway stars that might have been ejected during a collision of two binary star groups or a multiple system. This event is credited with ejecting AE Aurigae, Mu Columbae and 53 Arietis at above 200 km·s^{−1} and has been traced to the Trapezium Cluster in the Orion Nebula some two million years ago.

== Designations and nomenclature ==
=== Multiple star designations ===
The components of multiple stars can be specified by appending the suffixes A, B, C, etc., to the system's designation. Suffixes such as AB may be used to denote the pair consisting of A and B. The sequence of letters B, C, etc. may be assigned in order of separation from the component A. Components discovered close to an already known component may be assigned suffixes such as Aa, Ba, and so forth.

=== Nomenclature in the Multiple Star Catalogue ===
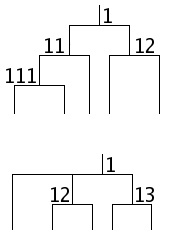
Subsystem notation in Tokovinin's Multiple Star Catalogue

A. A. Tokovinin's Multiple Star Catalogue uses a system in which each subsystem in a mobile diagram is encoded by a sequence of digits. In the mobile diagram (d) above, for example, the widest system would be given the number 1, while the subsystem containing its primary component would be numbered 11 and the subsystem containing its secondary component would be numbered 12. Subsystems which would appear below this in the mobile diagram will be given numbers with three, four, or more digits. When describing a non-hierarchical system by this method, the same subsystem number will be used more than once; for example, a system with three visual components, A, B, and C, no two of which can be grouped into a subsystem, would have two subsystems numbered 1 denoting the two binaries AB and AC. In this case, if B and C were subsequently resolved into binaries, they would be given the subsystem numbers 12 and 13.

=== Future multiple star system nomenclature ===
The current nomenclature for double and multiple stars can cause confusion as binary stars discovered in different ways are given different designations (for example, discoverer designations for visual binary stars and variable star designations for eclipsing binary stars), and, worse, component letters may be assigned differently by different authors, so that, for example, one person's A can be another's C. Discussion starting in 1999 resulted in four proposed schemes to address this problem:

- KoMa, a hierarchical scheme using upper- and lower-case letters and Arabic and Roman numerals;
- The Urban/Corbin Designation Method, a hierarchical numeric scheme similar to the Dewey Decimal Classification system;
- The Sequential Designation Method, a non-hierarchical scheme in which components and subsystems are assigned numbers in order of discovery; and
- WMC, the Washington Multiplicity Catalog, a hierarchical scheme in which the suffixes used in the Washington Double Star Catalog are extended with additional suffixed letters and numbers.

For a designation system, identifying the hierarchy within the system has the advantage that it makes identifying subsystems and computing their properties easier. However, it causes problems when new components are discovered at a level above or intermediate to the existing hierarchy. In this case, part of the hierarchy will shift inwards. Components which are found to be nonexistent, or are later reassigned to a different subsystem, also cause problems.

During the 24th General Assembly of the International Astronomical Union in 2000, the WMC scheme was endorsed and it was resolved by Commissions 5, 8, 26, 42, and 45 that it should be expanded into a usable uniform designation scheme. A sample of a catalog using the WMC scheme, covering half an hour of right ascension, was later prepared. The issue was discussed again at the 25th General Assembly in 2003, and it was again resolved by commissions 5, 8, 26, 42, and 45, as well as the Working Group on Interferometry, that the WMC scheme should be expanded and further developed.

The sample WMC is hierarchically organized; the hierarchy used is based on observed orbital periods or separations. Since it contains many visual double stars, which may be optical rather than physical, this hierarchy may be only apparent. It uses upper-case letters (A, B, ...) for the first level of the hierarchy, lower-case letters (a, b, ...) for the second level, and numbers (1, 2, ...) for the third. Subsequent levels would use alternating lower-case letters and numbers, but no examples of this were found in the sample.

== Examples ==
=== Binary ===
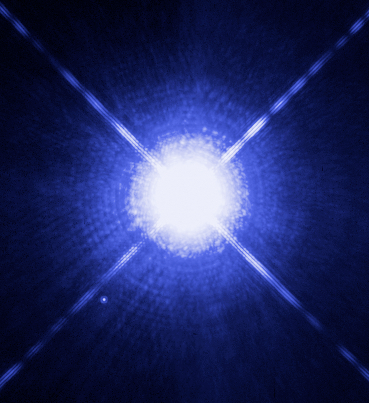
Sirius A (center), with its white dwarf companion, Sirius B (lower left) taken by the Hubble Space Telescope.

- Sirius, a binary consisting of a main-sequence type A star and a white dwarf
- Procyon, which is similar to Sirius
- Mira, a variable consisting of a red giant and a white dwarf
- Delta Cephei, a Cepheid variable
- Almaaz, an eclipsing binary
- Spica

=== Triple ===
- Alpha Centauri is a triple star composed of a main binary yellow dwarf and an orange dwarf pair (Rigil Kentaurus and Toliman), and an outlying red dwarf, Proxima Centauri. Together, Rigil Kentaurus and Toliman form a physical binary star, designated as Alpha Centauri AB, α Cen AB, or RHD 1 AB, where the AB denotes this is a binary system. The moderately eccentric orbit of the binary can make the components be as close as 11 AU or as far away as 36 AU. Proxima Centauri, also (though less frequently) called Alpha Centauri C, is much farther away (between 4300 and 13,000 AU) from α Cen AB, and orbits the central pair with a period of 547,000 (+66,000/-40,000) years.
- Polaris or Alpha Ursae Minoris (α UMi), the north star, is a triple star system in which the closer companion star is extremely close to the main star—so close that it was only known from its gravitational tug on Polaris A (α UMi A) until it was imaged by the Hubble Space Telescope in 2006.
- Gliese 667 is a triple star system with two K-type main sequence stars and a red dwarf. The red dwarf, C, hosts between two and seven planets, of which one, Cc, alongside the unconfirmed Cf and Ce, are potentially habitable.
- HD 188753 is a triple star system located approximately 149 light-years away from Earth in the constellation Cygnus. The system is composed of HD 188753A, a yellow dwarf; HD 188753B, an orange dwarf; and HD 188753C, a red dwarf. B and C orbit each other every 156 days, and, as a group, orbit A every 25.7 years.
- Fomalhaut (α PsA, α Piscis Austrini) is a triple star system in the constellation Piscis Austrinus. It was discovered to be a triple system in 2013, when the K type flare star TW Piscis Austrini and the red dwarf LP 876-10 were all confirmed to share proper motion through space. The primary has a massive dust disk similar to that of the early Solar System, but much more massive. It also contains a gas giant, Fomalhaut b. That same year, the tertiary star, LP 876-10 was also confirmed to house a dust disk.
- HD 181068 is a unique triple system, consisting of a red giant and two main-sequence stars. The orbits of the stars are oriented in such a way that all three stars eclipse each other.

=== Quadruple ===
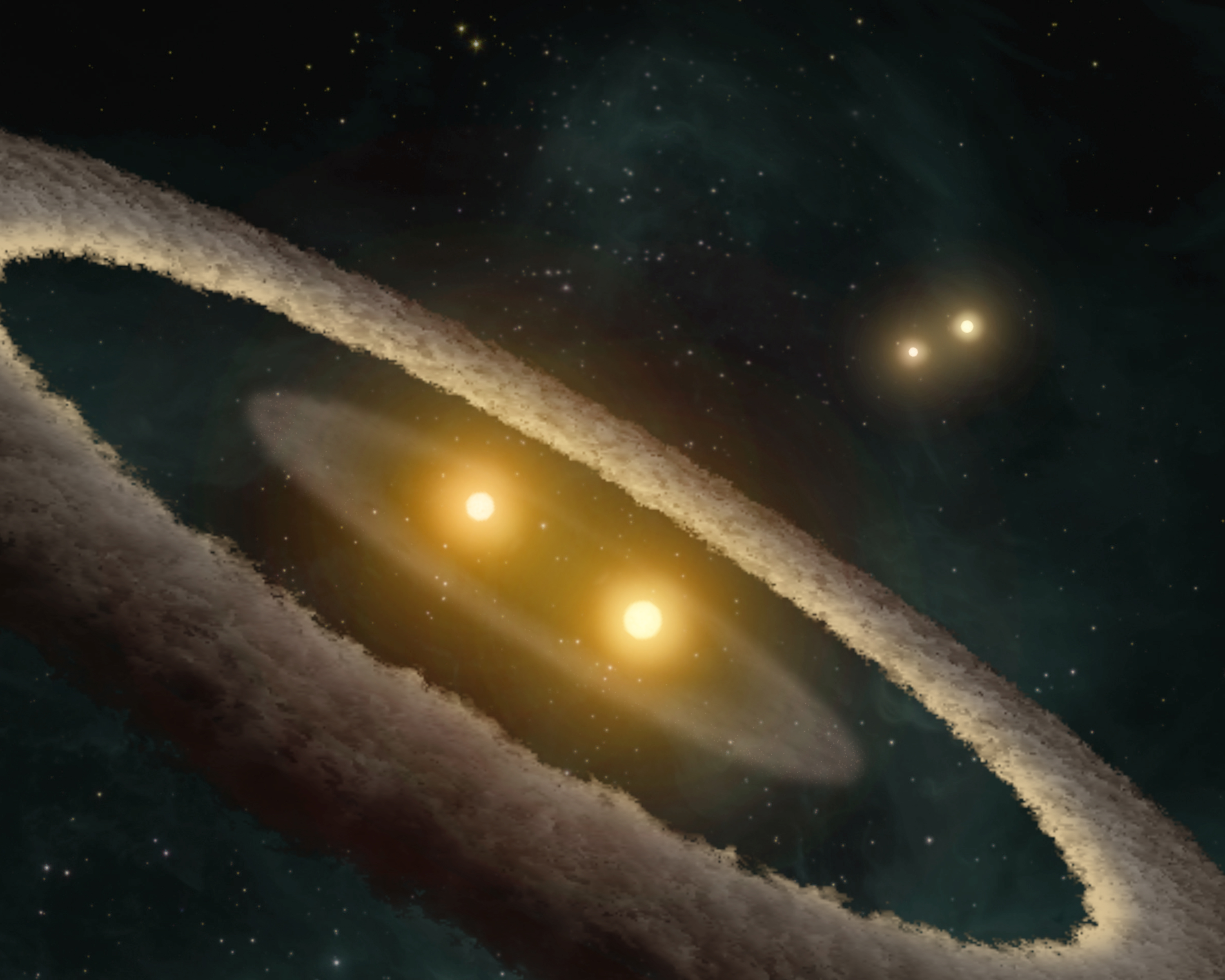
HD 98800 is a quadruple star system located in the TW Hydrae association.

- Capella, a pair of giant stars orbited by a pair of red dwarfs, around 42 light years away from the Solar System. It has an apparent magnitude of around 0.08, making Capella one of the brightest stars in the night sky.
- 4 Centauri
- Mizar is often said to have been the first binary star discovered when it was observed in 1650 by Giovanni Battista Riccioli^{, p. 1} but it was probably observed earlier, by Benedetto Castelli and Galileo. Later, spectroscopy of its components Mizar A and B revealed that they are both binary stars themselves.
- HD 98800
- The PH1 system has the planet PH1 b (discovered in 2012 by the Planet Hunters group, a part of the Zooniverse) orbiting two of the four stars, making it the first known planet to be in a quadruple star system.
- KOI-2626 is the first quadruple star system with an Earth-sized planet.
- Xi Tauri (ξ Tau, ξ Tauri), located about 222 light years away, is a spectroscopic and eclipsing quadruple star consisting of three blue-white B-type main-sequence stars, along with an F-type star. Two of the stars are in a close orbit and revolve around each other once every 7.15 days. These in turn orbit the third star once every 145 days. The fourth star orbits the other three stars roughly every fifty years.

=== Quintuple ===
- Dabih
- Mintaka
- HD 155448
- KIC 4150611
- 1SWASP J093010.78+533859.5

=== Sextuple ===
- Beta Tucanae
- Castor
- HD 139691
- TIC 168789840
- If Alcor is considered part of the Mizar system, the system can be considered a sextuple.

=== Septuple ===
- Jabbah
- AR Cassiopeiae
- V871 Centauri
- Acrux

=== Octuple ===
- Gamma Cassiopeiae

=== Nonuple ===
- QZ Carinae

== See also ==
- Exoplanet
- Solar System
- N-body problem
