= 2M1207b =

Planetary-mass object orbiting the brown dwarf 2M1207

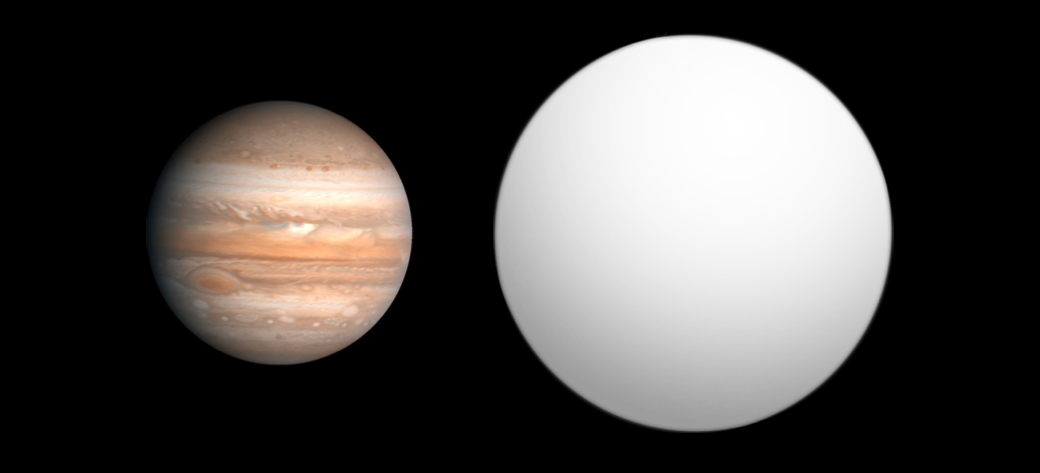
- Size comparison of 2M1207b with Jupiter.

Discovery
- Discovered by: Chauvin et al.
- Discovery site: Paranal Observatory, Chile
- Discovery date: April 2004
- Detection method: Imaged

Orbital characteristics
- Semi-major axis: 24–231 AU (3.6×10^{9}–3.46×10^{10} km)
- Eccentricity: 0.02–0.98
- Orbital period (sidereal): 633–20046 y
- Inclination: 13–150
- Longitude of ascending node: 7–174
- Time of periastron: 2107.69–12883.36
- Argument of periastron: 4–176
- Star: 2M1207

Physical characteristics
- Mean radius: 1.399 ^{+0.008}_{−0.010} R_{J}
- Mass: 5.5±0.5 M_{J}
- Temperature: 1200 K
- Spectral type: mid-to-late L

Atmosphere
- Composition by volume: hydrogen, water, carbon monoxide, helium

2M1207b is a planetary-mass object orbiting the brown dwarf 2M1207, in the constellation Centaurus, approximately 170 light-years from Earth. It is one of the first candidate exoplanets to be directly observed (by infrared imaging). It was discovered in April 2004 by the Very Large Telescope (VLT) at the Paranal Observatory in Chile by a team from the European Southern Observatory led by Gaël Chauvin. It is believed to be from 5 to 6 times the mass of Jupiter and may orbit 2M1207 at a distance roughly as far from the brown dwarf as Pluto is from the Sun.

The object is a very hot gas giant; the estimated surface temperature is roughly 1200 K (930 °C or 1700 °F), mostly due to gravitational contraction. Its mass is well below the calculated limit for deuterium fusion in brown dwarfs, which is 13 Jupiter masses. The projected distance between 2M1207b and its primary is around 40 AU (similar to the mean distance between Pluto and the Sun). Its infrared spectrum indicates the presence of water molecules in its atmosphere. The object is not a likely candidate to support life, either on its surface or on any satellites.

== Discovery and identification ==
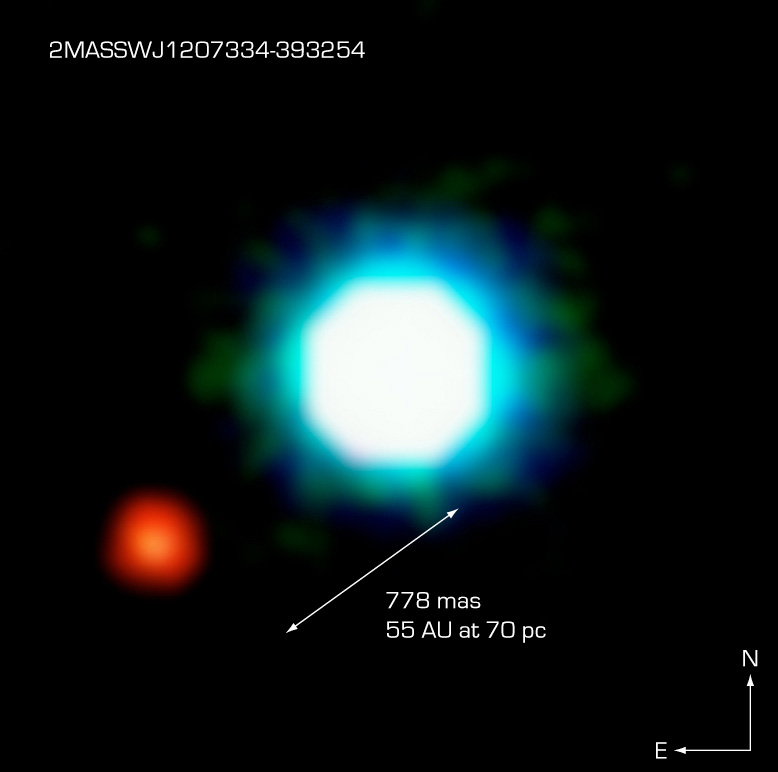
Infrared image of 2M1207 (blueish) and 2M1207b (reddish). The two objects are separated by less than one arc second in Earth's sky. Image taken using the ESO's 8.2m Yepun VLT.

2M1207b is around 100 times fainter in the sky than its companion. It was first spotted as a "faint reddish speck of light" in 2004 by the VLT. After the initial observation, there was some question as to whether the objects might be merely an optical double, but subsequent observations by the Hubble Space Telescope and the VLT have shown that the objects move together and are therefore presumably a binary system.

An initial photometric estimate for the distance to 2M1207b was 70 parsecs. In December 2005, American astronomer Eric Mamajek reported a more accurate distance (53±6 parsecs) to 2M1207b using the moving-cluster method. Trigonometric parallax results have confirmed this moving-cluster distance, leading to a distance estimate of 52.75^{+1.04}_{−1.00} parsecs or 172 ± 3 light years.

== Properties ==
Estimates for the mass, size, and temperature of 2M1207b are still uncertain. Although spectroscopic evidence is consistent with a mass of 8±2 M_{J} and a surface temperature of 1600 ± 100 kelvins (1327 ± 100 celsius), theoretical models for such an object predict a luminosity 10 times greater than observed. Because of this, lower estimates for the mass and temperature have been proposed. Alternatively, 2M1207b might be dimmed by a surrounding disk of dust and gas. As an unlikely possibility, Mamajek and Michael Meyer have suggested that the planet is actually much smaller, but is radiating away heat generated by a recent collision.

JWST observations of 2M1207B with NIRSpec did not detect any methane (CH_{4}) and only weak carbon monoxide (CO) in the atmosphere of this object. The best-fit models show stronger methane and carbon monoxide bands than observed. A weaker methane band is a sign for nonequilibrium chemistry for young low-mass objects. The weakness of carbon monoxide could be attributed to other effects, such as temperature gradient or cloud thickness. The researchers used cloudless models that show some inconsistency with the temperature and absorption of methane and carbon monoxide, which might be resolved in the future with models that include clouds. JWST MIRI detected absorption of silicate cloud, hinting at a dusty atmosphere.

The JWST NIRSpec observations were also able to detect emission of hydrogen (Paschen transitions) and the Helium I triplet at 1.083 μm. This is a sign of active accretion from a small circumstellar disk or circumplanetary disk. Observations with MIRI detected infrared excess coming from a circumplanetary disk. The disk fits the model of a transitional disk better than an evolved disk. A transitional disk has a truncated inner cavity, with the inner edge being further away from the planet.

== Status as an exoplanet ==
Although the mass of 2M1207b is less than that required for deuterium fusion to occur, some 13 times the mass of Jupiter, and the image of 2M1207b has been widely hailed as the first direct image of an exoplanet, it may be questioned whether 2M1207b is actually a planet. As of 2018, the International Astronomical Union's (IAU) official definition of an exoplanet requires that the mass ratio of the orbiting object to the central object be below the L4/L5 instability, which is given by the equation M/M_{central} < 2/(25+√621) ≈ 1/25. The mass ratio of 2M1207b and 2M1207 is approximately 0.22, which exceeds the L4/L5 instability threshold and therefore means 2M1207b does not qualify as an exoplanet under the IAU's definition.

Some other definitions of the term planet require a planet to have formed in the same way as the planets in the Solar System did, by secondary accretion in a protoplanetary disk. With such a definition, if 2M1207b formed by direct gravitational collapse of a gaseous nebula, it would be a sub-brown dwarf rather than a planet. A similar debate exists regarding the identity of GQ Lupi b, also first imaged in 2004. On the other hand, the discovery of marginal cases like Cha 110913-773444—a free-floating, planetary-mass object—raises the question of whether distinction by formation is a reliable dividing line between stars/brown dwarfs and planets. In 2006, the IAU's Working Group on Extrasolar Planets described 2M1207b as a "possible planetary-mass companion to a brown dwarf."

== See also ==
- HD 172555
- Rogue planet
