= 2M1207 =

Brown dwarf in the constellation Centaurus

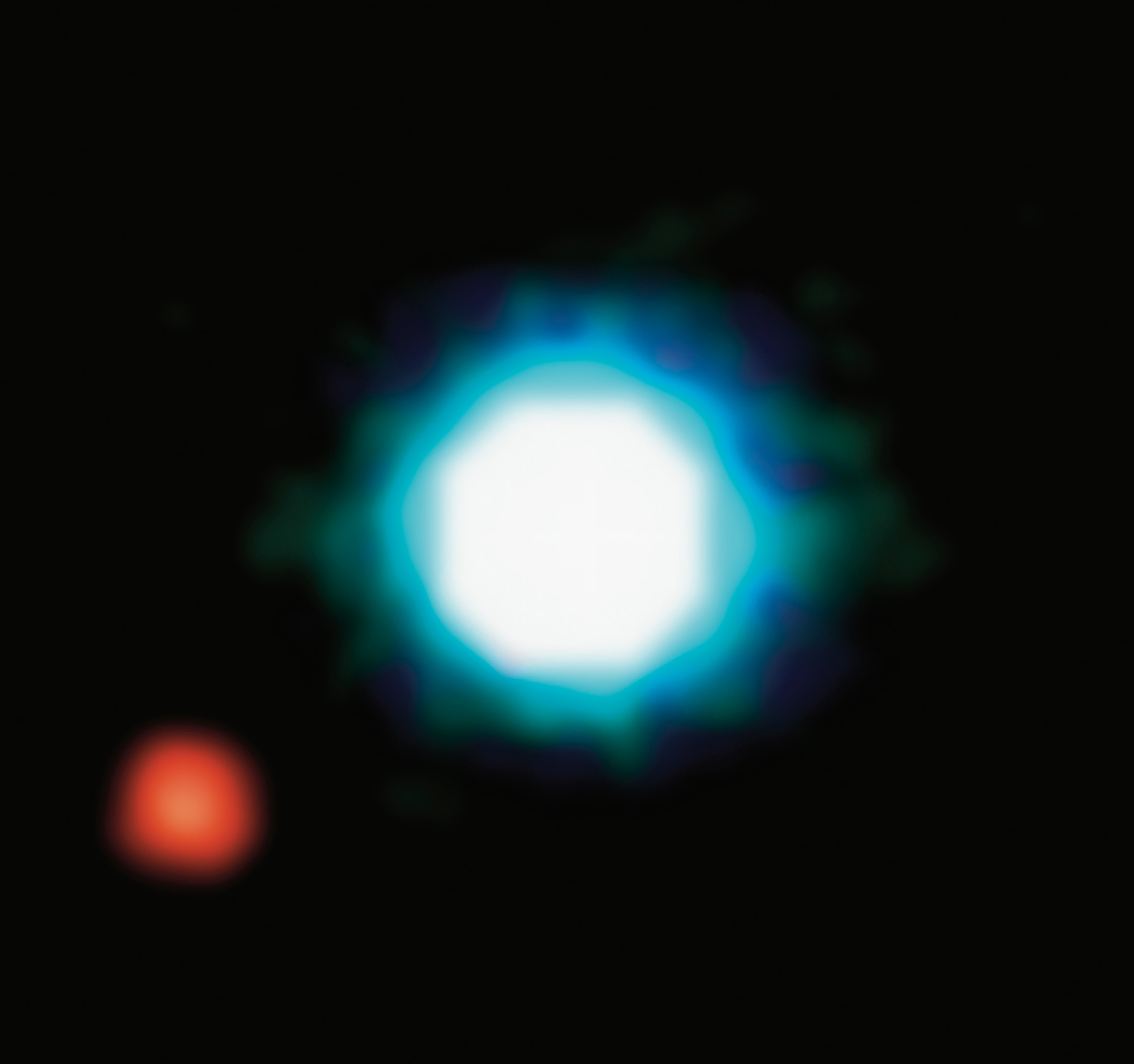
- European Southern Observatory infrared image of 2M1207 (bluish) and companion planet 2M1207b (reddish), taken in 2004.

Observation data Epoch J2000.0 Equinox ICRS
- Constellation: Centaurus
- Right ascension: 12^{h} 07^{m} 33.47^{s}
- Declination: −39° 32′ 54.0″
- Apparent magnitude (V): 20.15

Characteristics
- Evolutionary stage: brown dwarf
- Spectral type: M8IVe
- V−R color index: +2.1
- R−I color index: +2.1

Astrometry
Proper motion (μ)	RA: −64.040±0.087 mas/yr Dec.: −23.678±0.072 mas/yr
Parallax (π)	15.4624±0.1163 mas
Distance	211 ± 2 ly (64.7 ± 0.5 pc)

Details
Mass	~0.025 M_{☉}
Radius	2.6 R_{Jup}
Luminosity	0.0038 L_{☉}
Surface gravity (log g)	4.3 cgs
Temperature	2,780 K
Age	5-10 Myr

Other designations
- 2MASSW J1207334−393254, 2MASS J12073346−3932539, TWA 27

Database references
SIMBAD	data

2M1207, 2M1207A or 2MASS J12073346−3932539 is a brown dwarf located in the constellation Centaurus; a companion object, 2M1207b, may be the first extrasolar planetary-mass companion to be directly imaged, and is the first discovered orbiting a brown dwarf.

2M1207 was discovered during the course of the 2MASS infrared sky survey: hence the "2M" in its name, followed by its celestial coordinates. With a fairly early (for a brown dwarf) spectral type of M8, it is very young, and probably a member of the TW Hydrae association. Its estimated mass is around 25 Jupiter masses. The companion, 2M1207b, is estimated to have a mass of 5–6 Jupiter masses. Still glowing red hot, it will shrink to a size slightly smaller than Jupiter as it cools over the next few billion years.

An initial photometric estimate for the distance to 2M1207 was 70 parsecs. In December 2005, American astronomer Eric Mamajek reported a more accurate distance (53 ± 6 parsecs) to 2M1207 using the moving cluster method. The new distance gives a fainter luminosity for 2M1207. Recent trigonometric parallax results have confirmed this moving cluster distance, leading to a distance estimate of 53 ± 1 parsec or 172 ± 3 light years.

== Planetary system ==
Like classical T Tauri stars, many brown dwarfs are surrounded by disks of gas and dust which accrete onto the brown dwarf. 2M1207 was first suspected to have such a disk because of its broad H_{α} line. This was later confirmed by ultraviolet spectroscopy. The existence of a dust disk has also been confirmed by infrared observations and with ALMA. In general, accretion from disks are known to produce fast-moving jets, perpendicular to the disk, of ejected material. This has also been observed for 2M1207; an April 2007 paper in the Astrophysical Journal reports that this brown dwarf is spouting jets of material from its poles. The jets, which extend around 10^{9} kilometers into space, were discovered using the Very Large Telescope (VLT) at the European Southern Observatory. Material in the jets streams into space at a few kilometers per second. While previous observations with the Spitzer spectrograph already detected acetylene (C_{2}H_{2}) emission in the disk of 2M1207, new observations with MIRI revealed emission of a wide variety of chemicals in the disk, showing a carbon-rich chemistry. In this study 2M1207 and ISO-ChaI 147 showed the largest number of organic molecules, including the only detection of ethylene (C_{2}H_{4}) in this sample. The detected chemicals include 9 hydrocarbons, with diacetylene (C_{4}H_{2}) and benzene (C_{6}H_{6}) being two prominent emission lines in the spectrum of 2M1207. Other emissions by chemicals in the disk are hydrogen gas (H_{2}), hydrogen cyanide (HCN) and carbon dioxide (CO_{2}).

2M1207b shows weak accretion from a disk, inferred from emission lines of hydrogen and helium in medium-resolution NIRSpec data. Surprisingly 2M1207b does not show absorption due to methane, which was predicted to be present for this object. It was suggested that very young objects have a L/T-transition starts at a later spectral type.

The 2M1207A planetary system
Companion (in order from star)	Mass	Semimajor axis (AU)	Orbital period (years)	Eccentricity	Inclination (°)	Radius
circumstellar disk	9.4±1.5 AU				35+20 −15°	—
b	5.5±0.5 M_{J}	≥ 49.8 ± 1.1 (Note: From Gaia distance of 64.7 ± 0.5 parsec and observed angular separation of 769 ± 10 milliarseconds (angular separation from Mohanty 2007, above). Real semimajor axis might be higher due to viewing angle and eccentricity of the orbit.)	633–20046	0.02–0.98	13–150	1.2 – 1.40 ±0.01 R_{J}

== See also ==
- Lists of exoplanets
- Direct imaging of extrasolar planets
