= TW Hydrae =

T Tauri star in the constellation Hydra

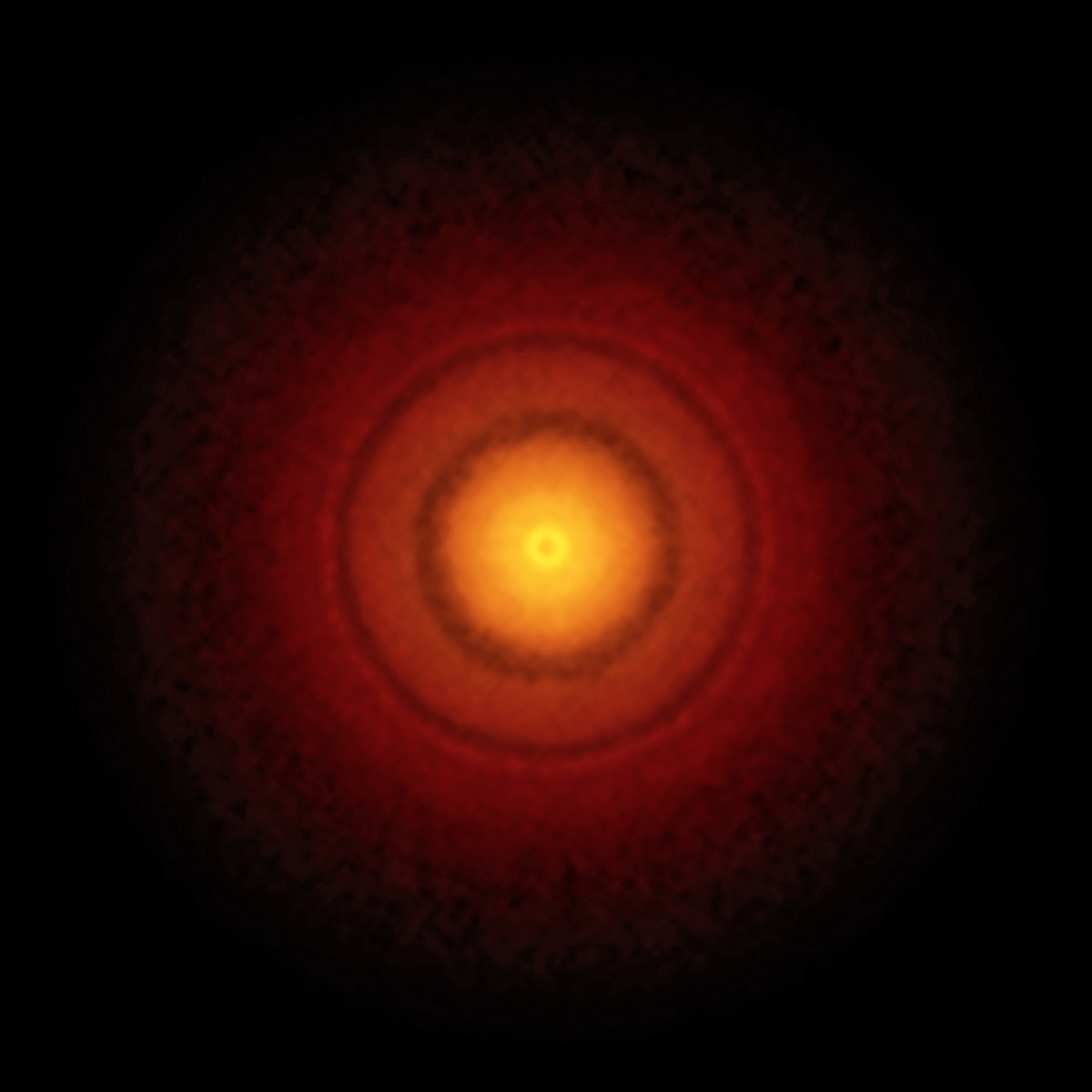
- TW Hydrae protoplanetary disc

Observation data Epoch J2000.0 Equinox ICRS
- Constellation: Hydra
- Right ascension: 11^{h} 01^{m} 51.90533^{s}
- Declination: −34° 42′ 17.0332″
- Apparent magnitude (V): 10.92

Characteristics
- Evolutionary stage: Pre-main-sequence
- Spectral type: K6Ve
- U−B color index: −0.33
- B−V color index: 0.721
- Variable type: T Tauri

Astrometry
Radial velocity (R_{v})	+13.40±0.8 km/s
Proper motion (μ)	RA: −68.309 mas/yr Dec.: −13.900 mas/yr
Parallax (π)	16.6289±0.0150 mas
Distance	196.1 ± 0.2 ly (60.14 ± 0.05 pc)
Absolute magnitude (M_{V})	7.30

Details
Mass	0.80±0.05 M_{☉}
Radius	1.16±0.13 R_{☉}
Luminosity (bolometric)	0.33±0.08 L_{☉}
Surface gravity (log g)	4.2±0.1 cgs
Temperature	4050±50 K
Rotation	3.606±0.010 d
Rotational velocity (v sin i)	3±1 km/s
Age	7.5±2.5 Myr

Other designations
- TWA 1, TW Hya, CD−34°7151, HIP 53911

Database references
SIMBAD	data

TW Hydrae is a T Tauri star approximately 196 light-years away in the constellation of Hydra (the Sea Serpent). TW Hydrae is about 80% of the mass of the Sun, but is only about 5-10 million years old. The star appears to be accreting from a protoplanetary disk of dust and gas, oriented face-on to Earth, which has been resolved in images from the ALMA observatory. TW Hydrae is one of the closest protoplanetary disk hosts, which combined with its face-on orientation makes it one of the best-studied objects to understand planetary formation.

TW Hydrae is accompanied by over 40 other low-mass stars and brown dwarfs with similar ages and spatial motions, comprising the TW Hydrae association or TWA, one of the closest regions of recent "fossil" star-formation to the Sun.

== Stellar characteristics ==
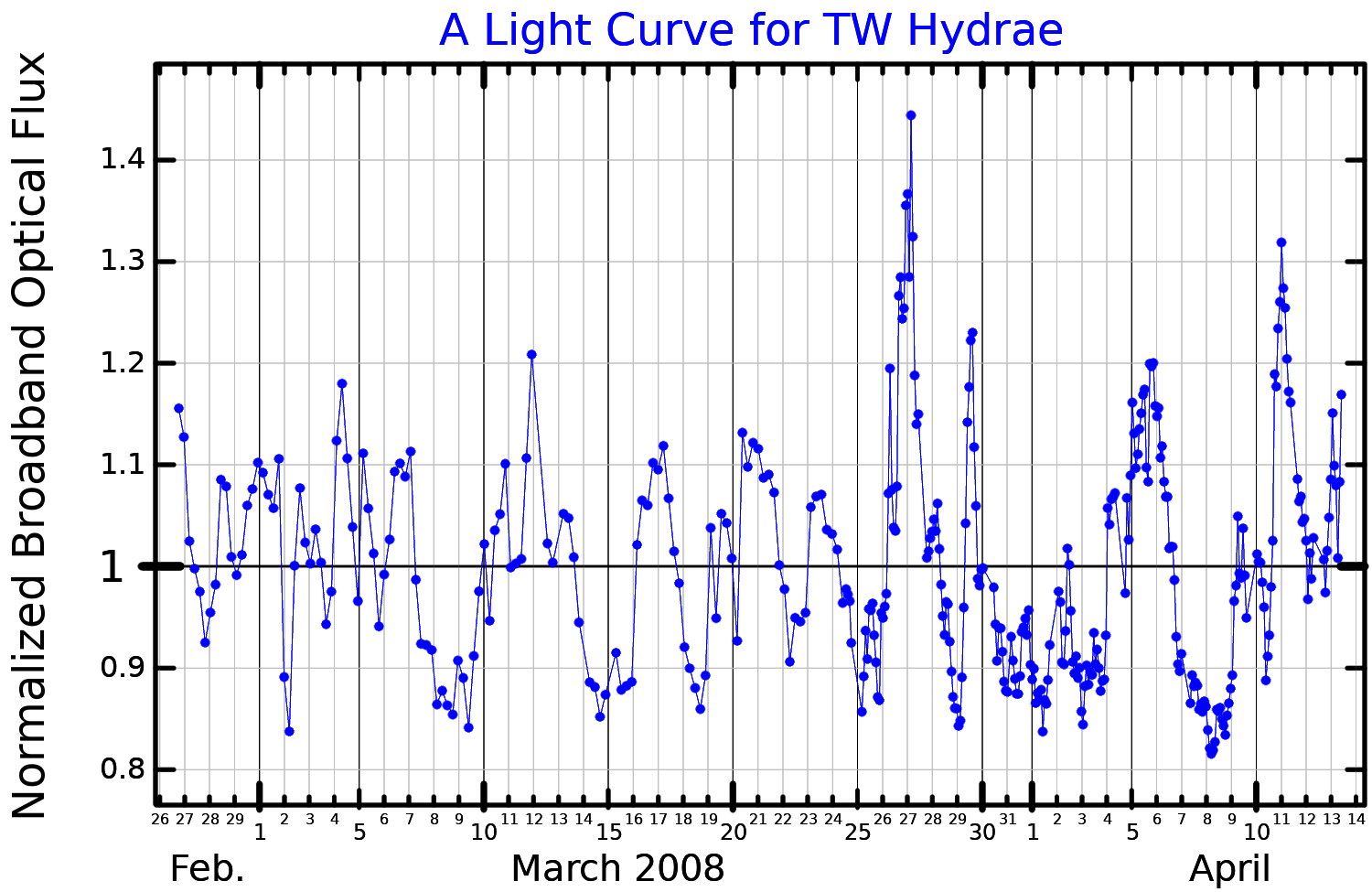
A broadband optical light curve plotted from MOST microsatellite data published by Rucinski et al. (2008)

TW Hydrae is a pre-main-sequence star that is approximately 80% the mass and 116% the radius of the Sun. It has a temperature of 4050 K and is about 7.5 million years old. In comparison, the Sun is about 4.6 billion years old and has a temperature of 5778 K. The star's luminosity is 0.33 times that of the Sun. The stellar classification is K6Ve. The star rotates with a period of 3.6 days.

The star's apparent magnitude, or how bright it appears from Earth's perspective, is 10.92. Therefore, it is too dim to be seen with the naked eye.

== Planetary system ==
=== Protoplanetary disk ===
==== Detection of methanol ====
In 2016, methanol, one of the building blocks for life, was detected in the star's protoplanetary disk.

=== Possible planets ===
The TW Hydrae planetary system
Companion (in order from star)	Mass	Semimajor axis (AU)	Orbital period (days)	Eccentricity	Inclination (°)	Radius
b (unconfirmed)	≥30+9 −7 M_{🜨}	0.075±0.001	8.339±0.008	—	—	—
(unconfirmed)	—	5.5±0.8	—	—	—	—
(unconfirmed)	~26 M_{🜨}	22	—	—	—	—
(unconfirmed)	~4 M_{🜨}	42	—	—	—	—
(unconfirmed)	6–28 M_{🜨}	80	—	—	—	—
(unconfirmed)	~0.3 M_{J}	94	—	—	—	—
Protoplanetary disk	1–30? AU				—	—

==== Disproven protoplanet (2007) ====
In December 2007, a team led by Johny Setiawan of the Max Planck Institute for Astronomy in Heidelberg, Germany announced discovery of a planet orbiting TW Hydrae, dubbed "TW Hydrae b" with a minimum mass around 1.2 Jupiter masses, a period of 3.56 days, and an orbital radius of 0.04 astronomical units (inside the inner rim of the protoplanetary disk). Assuming it orbited in the same plane as the outer part of the dust disk (inclination 7±1°), it would have a true mass of 9.8±3.3 Jupiter masses. However, if the inclination was similar to the inner part of the dust disk (4.3±1.0°), the mass would be 16^{+5}_{−3} Jupiter masses, making it a brown dwarf. Since the star itself is so young, it was presumed this was the youngest extrasolar planet then discovered, and essentially still in formation.

In 2008 a team of Spanish researchers concluded that the planet does not exist: the radial velocity variations were not consistent when observed at different wavelengths, which would not occur if the origin of the radial velocity variations was caused by an orbiting planet. Instead, the data was better modelled by starspots on TW Hydrae's surface passing in and out of view as the star rotates. "Results support the spot scenario rather than the presence of a hot Jupiter around TW Hya". Similar wavelength-dependent radial velocity variations, also caused by starspots, have been detected on other T Tauri stars.

==== Other candidates ====
A 2013 study proposed that a gap in the disk at 80 AU could be formed by a planet with a mass of 6–28 M_{🜨}.

In 2016, astronomers studying the protoplanetary disk of the star with ALMA found evidence that a possible Neptune-like planet was forming in a gap in its disk, at a distance of around 22 AU (somewhat less than the orbital distance of Neptune from the Sun, which is 30 AU). This planet would be an ice giant with an estimated mass around 1.5 times that of Neptune (25.7 M_{🜨}). The study was added to the online journal preprint archive arXiv on May 1, 2016, and published in The Astrophysical Journal in October.

Another 2016 study detected a candidate companion at 5.5 AU.

A 2018 study proposed two super-Earths of around 4 Earth masses to explain gaps at 24 and 41 AU, and a Saturn-mass planet in a gap at 94 AU.

==== 2024 planetary candidates ====
In 2024, a study detected radial velocity variations in TW Hydrae with a period of 8.3 days, which may be caused by an orbiting planet, or alternatively by part of the inner accretion disk. Like the 2007 candidate, this was designated planet "b". This object would have a minimum mass of about 30 Earth masses, but if its orbit is aligned with the rotation of the star (which is nearly face-on) its true mass would be 0.55+0.17
−0.13 M_{J}, about half the mass of Jupiter.

Also in 2024, observations with ALMA showed sulfur monoxide representing an outflow from an embedded protoplanet. The position of the brightest emission coincides with a planet-carved dust gap at 42 au. Previously this gap was suggested to be associated with the formation of a super-Earth, and by modelling the outflow velocity, the researchers estimate a mass of about 4 Earth masses. The mass accretion of this embedded protoplanet is constrained to between 3 ×10^{−7} and 10^{−5} M_{J}/year.

== Gallery ==
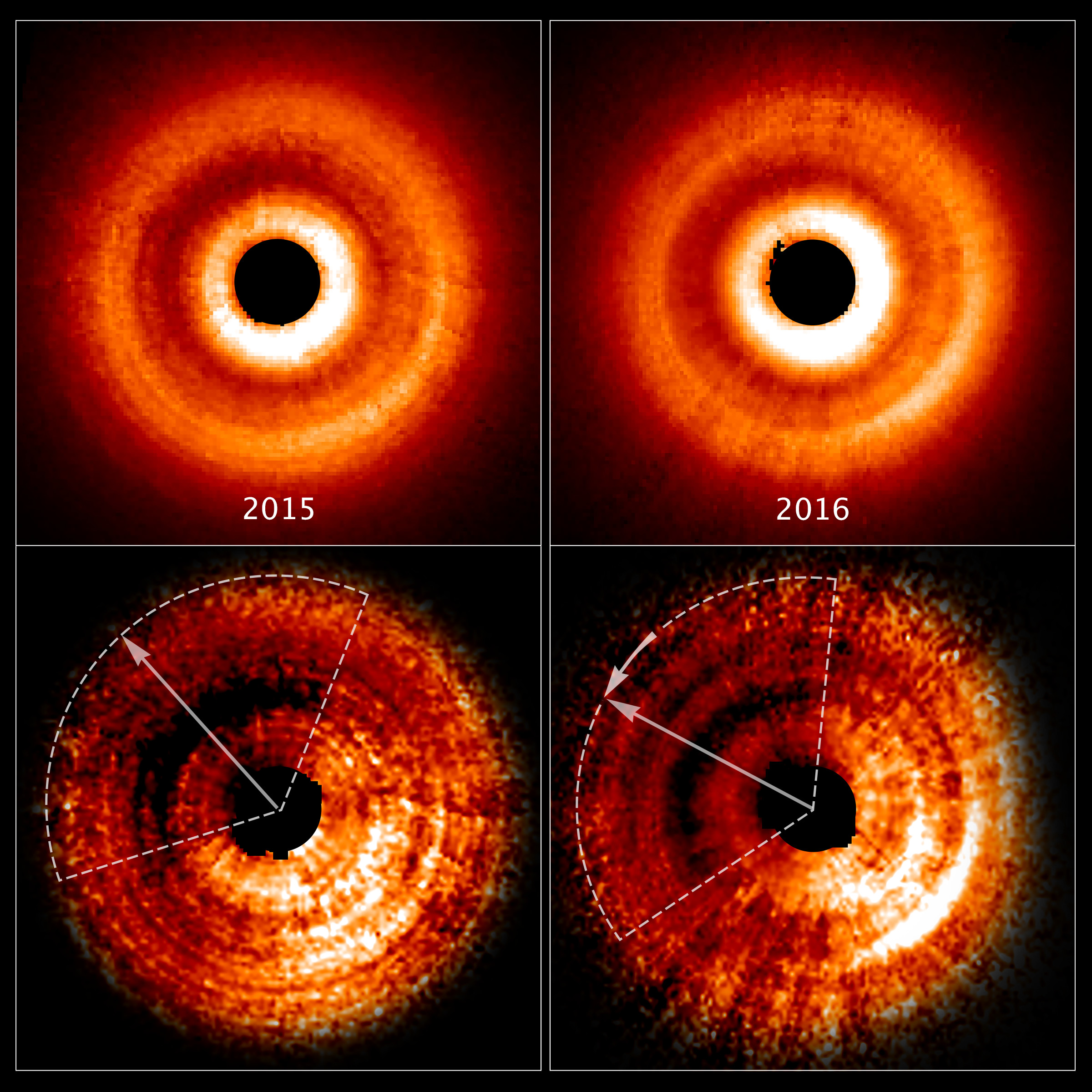
Shadow moving counterclockwise around a gas and dust disc.

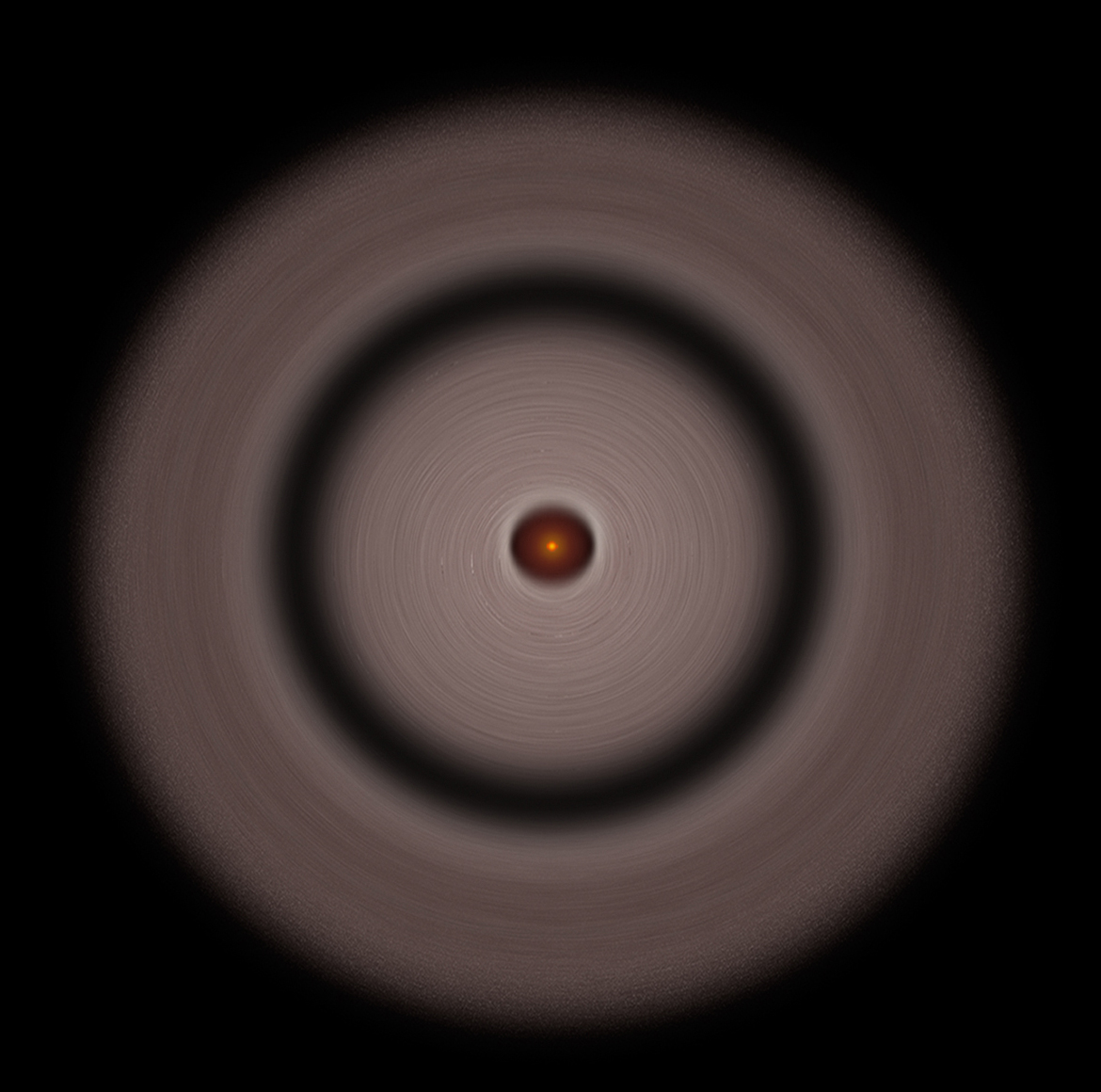
Simulation based on Hubble observations.

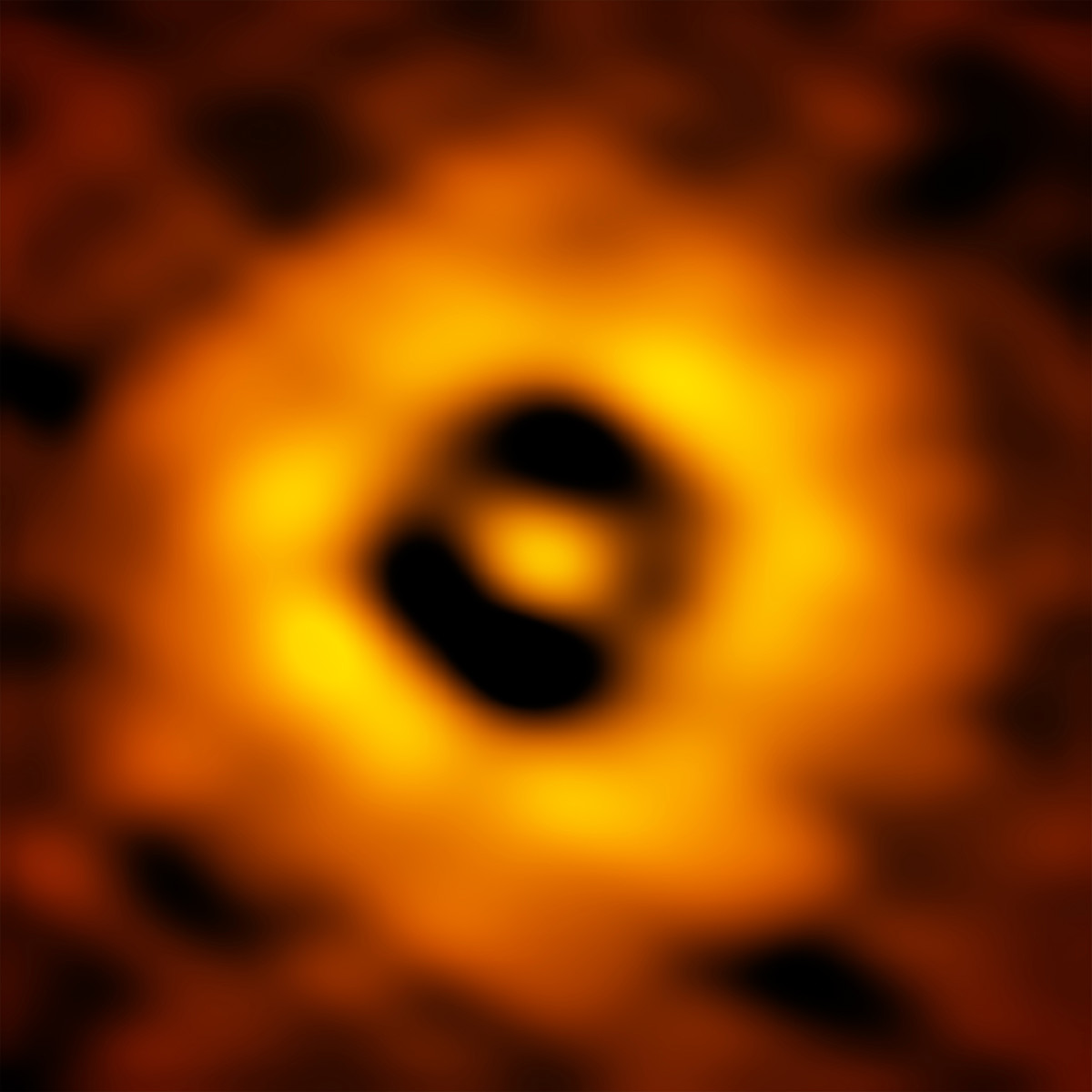
Inner region of TW Hydrae protoplanetary disc

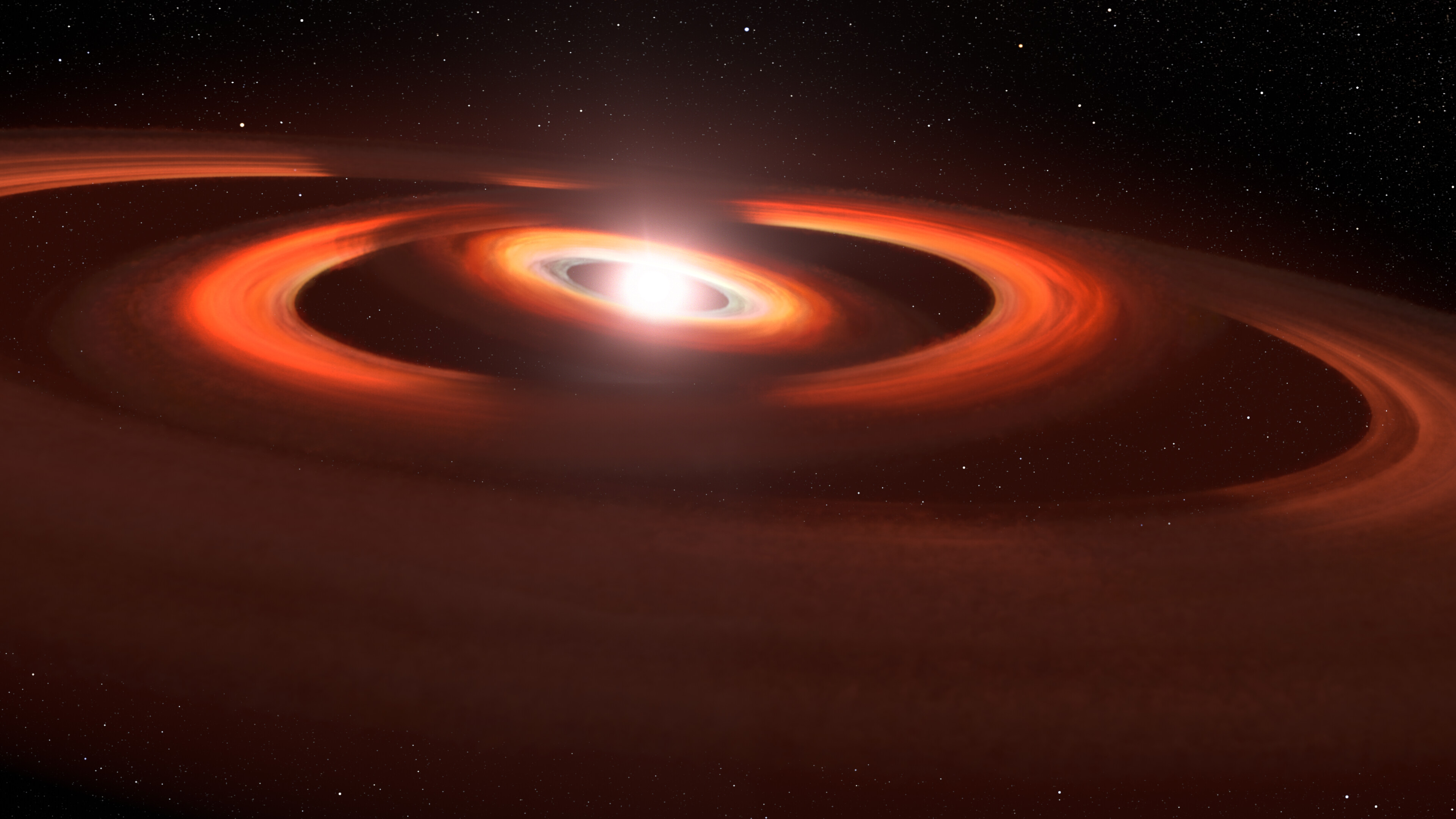
This illustration is based on NASA/ESA Hubble Space Telescope images of a gas and dust discs encircling the young star TW Hydrae.

This artist’s impression video shows the protoplanetary disc around TW Hydrae. The organic molecule methyl alcohol (methanol) has been found in this disc.
