= List of stars in Centaurus =

This is the list of notable stars in the constellation Centaurus, sorted by decreasing brightness.

| Name | B | F | G. | Var | HD | HIP | RA | Dec | vis. mag. | abs. mag. | Dist. (ly) | Sp. class | Notes |
|---|---|---|---|---|---|---|---|---|---|---|---|---|---|
| α Cen A | α | | 363 | | 128620 | 71683 | 14^{h} 39^{m} 40.90^{s} | −60° 50′ 06.5″ | −0.01 | 4.34 | 4.36 | G2V | Rigil Kentaurus; nearest star system; 4th brightest star; a component of the triple Alpha Centauri star system |
| β Cen | β | | 304 | | 122451 | 68702 | 14^{h} 03^{m} 49.44^{s} | −60° 22′ 22.7″ | 0.61 | −5.42 | 525 | B1III | Hadar, Agena; β Cep variable, ΔV = 0.045^{m}, P = 0.157 d |
| α Cen B | α | | 364 | | 128621 | 71681 | 14^{h} 39^{m} 39.39^{s} | −60° 50′ 22.1″ | 1.35 | 5.70 | 4.36 | K1V | Toliman, 21st brightest star; a component of the triple Alpha Centauri star system; has a refuted planet (b) |
| θ Cen | θ | 5 | 314 | | 123139 | 68933 | 14^{h} 06^{m} 41.32^{s} | −36° 22′ 07.3″ | 2.06 | 0.70 | 61 | K0IIIb | Menkent |
| γ Cen | γ | | 134 | | 110304 | 61932 | 12^{h} 41^{m} 31.20^{s} | −48° 57′ 35.6″ | 2.20 | −0.81 | 130 | A1IV | Muhlifain; binary period 89.3 y |
| ε Cen | ε | | 245 | | 118716 | 66657 | 13^{h} 39^{m} 53.27^{s} | −53° 27′ 58.9″ | 2.29 | −3.02 | 376 | B1III | β Cep variable, ΔV = 0.02^{m}, P = 0.169608 d |
| η Cen | η | | 356 | | 127972 | 71352 | 14^{h} 35^{m} 30.45^{s} | −42° 09′ 27.9″ | 2.33 | −2.55 | 308 | B1Vn + A | γ Cas variable, V_{max} = 2.30^{m}, V_{min} = 2.41^{m} |
| ζ Cen | ζ | | 289 | | 121263 | 68002 | 13^{h} 55^{m} 32.43^{s} | −47° 17′ 17.8″ | 2.55 | −2.81 | 384 | B2.5IV | Leepwal; spectroscopic binary |
| δ Cen | δ | | 94 | | 105435 | 59196 | 12^{h} 08^{m} 21.54^{s} | −50° 43′ 20.7″ | 2.58 | −2.84 | 395 | B2IVne | γ Cas variable, V_{max} = 2.51^{m}, V_{min} = 2.65^{m} |
| ι Cen | ι | | 204 | | 115892 | 65109 | 13^{h} 20^{m} 36.07^{s} | −36° 42′ 43.5″ | 2.75 | 1.48 | 59 | A2V | Kulou |
| λ Cen | λ | | 46 | | 100841 | 56561 | 11^{h} 35^{m} 46.93^{s} | −63° 01′ 11.4″ | 3.11 | −2.39 | 410 | B9II: | |
| κ Cen | κ | | 385 | | 132200 | 73334 | 14^{h} 59^{m} 09.70^{s} | −42° 06′ 14.9″ | 3.13 | −2.96 | 539 | B2IV | suspected variable |
| ν Cen | ν | | 272 | | 120307 | 67464 | 13^{h} 49^{m} 30.30^{s} | −41° 41′ 15.6″ | 3.41 | −2.41 | 475 | B2IV | Heng, rotating ellipsoidal variable and β Cep variable, ΔV = 0.03^{m} |
| μ Cen | μ | | 273 | | 120324 | 67472 | 13^{h} 49^{m} 37.01^{s} | −42° 28′ 25.3″ | 3.47 | −2.57 | 527 | B2IV-Ve | γ Cas variable, V_{max} = 2.92^{m}, V_{min} = 3.47^{m} |
| φ Cen | φ | | 296 | | 121743 | 68245 | 13^{h} 58^{m} 16.28^{s} | −42° 06′ 02.5″ | 3.83 | −1.94 | 465 | B2IV | |
| τ Cen | τ | | 131 | | 109787 | 61622 | 12^{h} 37^{m} 42.33^{s} | −48° 32′ 28.6″ | 3.85 | 0.82 | 132 | A2V | |
| υ^{1} Cen | υ^{1} | | 297 | | 121790 | 68282 | 13^{h} 58^{m} 40.77^{s} | −44° 48′ 12.7″ | 3.87 | −1.67 | 417 | B2IV-V | |
| π Cen | π | | 24 | | 98718 | 55425 | 11^{h} 21^{m} 00.44^{s} | −54° 29′ 27.7″ | 3.90 | −1.07 | 321 | B5Vn | binary star |
| d Cen | d | | 227 | | 117440 | 65936 | 13^{h} 31^{m} 02.67^{s} | −39° 24′ 26.2″ | 3.90 | −4.03 | 1254 | G8II/III | |
| (ω Cen) | ω | | 219 | | | | 13^{h} 26^{m} 47.28^{s} | −47° 28′ 46.1″ | 3.90 | | 15800 | | |
| σ Cen | σ | | 121 | | 108483 | 60823 | 12^{h} 28^{m} 02.41^{s} | −50° 13′ 50.2″ | 3.91 | −1.76 | 443 | B3V | |
| ρ Cen | ρ | | 101 | | 105937 | 59449 | 12^{h} 11^{m} 39.15^{s} | −52° 22′ 06.3″ | 3.97 | −1.13 | 342 | B3V | |
| b Cen | b | | 368 | | 129116 | 71865 | 14^{h} 41^{m} 57.61^{s} | −37° 47′ 36.3″ | 4.01 | −0.85 | 305 | B2.5V | |
| ψ Cen | ψ | | 338 | | 125473 | 70090 | 14^{h} 20^{m} 33.48^{s} | −37° 53′ 07.0″ | 4.05 | −0.35 | 247 | A0IV | |
| c^{1} Cen | c^{1} | | 371 | | 129456 | 72010 | 14^{h} 43^{m} 39.48^{s} | −35° 10′ 23.6″ | 4.06 | 0.07 | 205 | K3III | |
| HD 102350 | | | 65 | | 102350 | 57439 | 11^{h} 46^{m} 30.85^{s} | −61° 10′ 42.1″ | 4.11 | −1.51 | 434 | G0II | Cepheid variable |
| 2 Cen | g | 2 | 274 | | 120323 | 67457 | 13^{h} 49^{m} 26.75^{s} | −34° 27′ 02.3″ | 4.19 | 0.51 | 177 | M5III | V806 Cen; semiregular variable, V_{max} = 4.16^{m}, V_{min} = 4.26^{m}, P = 12 d |
| 1 Cen | i | 1 | 265 | | 119756 | 67153 | 13^{h} 45^{m} 41.57^{s} | −33° 02′ 36.1″ | 4.23 | 2.81 | 63 | F3V | |
| n Cen | n | | 150 | | 111968 | 62896 | 12^{h} 53^{m} 26.15^{s} | −40° 10′ 43.7″ | 4.25 | 0.86 | 155 | A4IV | |
| ξ^{2} Cen | ξ^{2} | | 173 | V1261 (B) | 113791 | 64004 | 13^{h} 06^{m} 54.66^{s} | −49° 54′ 22.4″ | 4.27 | −1.24 | 412 | B1.5V | |
| j Cen | j | | 69 | | 102776 | 57669 | 11^{h} 49^{m} 41.09^{s} | −63° 47′ 18.6″ | 4.30 | −1.44 | 459 | B3V | suspected variable |
| v Cen | v | | 336 | | 125288 | 70069 | 14^{h} 20^{m} 19.55^{s} | −56° 23′ 11.3″ | 4.30 | −3.50 | 1185 | B6Ib | |
| 3 Cen A | k | 3 | 280 | V983 | 120709 | 67669 | 13^{h} 51^{m} 49.63^{s} | −32° 59′ 38.5″ | 4.32 | −0.48 | 297 | B5 | V983 Cen; double star; possible eclipsing binary, ΔV = 0.05^{m} |
| e Cen | e | | 149 | | 111915 | 62867 | 12^{h} 53^{m} 06.98^{s} | −48° 56′ 35.7″ | 4.33 | −0.51 | 303 | K3/K4III | |
| υ^{2} Cen | υ^{2} | | 303 | | 122223 | 68523 | 14^{h} 01^{m} 43.49^{s} | −45° 36′ 12.1″ | 4.34 | −1.35 | 448 | F6II | |
| χ Cen | χ | | 311 | | 122980 | 68862 | 14^{h} 06^{m} 02.79^{s} | −41° 10′ 46.5″ | 4.36 | −1.32 | 446 | B2V | β Cep variable, ΔV = ~0.02^{m}, P = 0.035 d |
| V761 Cen | a | | 342 | V761 | 125823 | 70300 | 14^{h} 23^{m} 02.26^{s} | −39° 30′ 42.4″ | 4.41 | −1.13 | 418 | B2V | Bidelman's Helium Variable Star; SX Ari variable, V_{max} = 4.38^{m}, V_{min} = 4.43^{m}, P = 8.8171 d |
| V863 Cen | | | 92 | V863 | 105382 | 59173 | 12^{h} 08^{m} 05.26^{s} | −50° 39′ 40.5″ | 4.46 | −0.85 | 376 | B2IIIne | Be star; variable, ΔV = ~0.05^{m} |
| B Cen | B | | 71 | | 102964 | 57803 | 11^{h} 51^{m} 08.75^{s} | −45° 10′ 24.4″ | 4.47 | −1.30 | 464 | K4III | |
| J Cen | J | | 208 | | 116087 | 65271 | 13^{h} 22^{m} 37.98^{s} | −60° 59′ 18.1″ | 4.52 | −0.66 | 354 | B3V | |
| m Cen | m | | 214 | | 116243 | 65387 | 13^{h} 24^{m} 00.44^{s} | −64° 32′ 08.2″ | 4.52 | 0.04 | 257 | G5III-IV | |
| V831 Cen | | | 183 | V831 | 114529 | 64425 | 13^{h} 12^{m} 17.63^{s} | −59° 55′ 13.9″ | 4.58 | −0.55 | 346 | B8V | ellipsoidal variable, V_{max} = 4.49^{m}, V_{min} = 4.66^{m} |
| A Cen | A | | 42 | | 100673 | 56480 | 11^{h} 34^{m} 45.71^{s} | −54° 15′ 50.9″ | 4.62 | −1.14 | 463 | B9V | |
| l Cen | l | | 132 | | 110073 | 61789 | 12^{h} 39^{m} 52.56^{s} | −39° 59′ 14.1″ | 4.63 | −0.55 | 355 | B8II/III | |
| M Cen | M | | 266 | | 119834 | 67234 | 13^{h} 46^{m} 39.37^{s} | −51° 25′ 57.7″ | 4.64 | 0.16 | 257 | G8/K0III | |
| w Cen | w | | 136 | | 110458 | 62012 | 12^{h} 42^{m} 35.56^{s} | −48° 48′ 46.9″ | 4.66 | 0.85 | 188 | K0III | |
| f Cen | f | | 171 | | 113703 | 63945 | 13^{h} 06^{m} 16.73^{s} | −48° 27′ 47.7″ | 4.71 | −0.81 | 414 | B5V | |
| 294 G. Cen | | | 294 | | 121474 | 68191 | 13^{h} 57^{m} 38.94^{s} | −63° 41′ 11.8″ | 4.71 | 0.68 | 209 | K4III | |
| 321 G. Cen | | | 321 | | 123569 | 69191 | 14^{h} 09^{m} 54.96^{s} | −53° 26′ 19.4″ | 4.74 | 1.01 | 182 | G8III | double star |
| 4 Cen | h | 4 | 284 | | 120955 | 67786 | 13^{h} 53^{m} 12.55^{s} | −31° 55′ 39.3″ | 4.75 | −1.81 | 669 | B4IV | |
| 340 G. Cen | | | 340 | | 125628 | 70264 | 14^{h} 22^{m} 37.12^{s} | −58° 27′ 33.0″ | 4.76 | 0.07 | 282 | G8/K1 + F/G | quadruple star |
| G Cen | G | | 119 | | 108257 | 60710 | 12^{h} 26^{m} 31.79^{s} | −51° 27′ 02.2″ | 4.82 | −0.62 | 400 | B3Vn | |
| ξ^{1} Cen | ξ^{1} | | 165 | | 113314 | 63724 | 13^{h} 03^{m} 33.35^{s} | −49° 31′ 38.1″ | 4.83 | 0.71 | 218 | A0V | |
| 185 G. Cen | | | 185 | | 114613 | 64408 | 13^{h} 12^{m} 03.47^{s} | −37° 48′ 11.3″ | 4.85 | 3.29 | 67 | G3IV | has a planet (b) |
| HR 4523 | | | 66 | | 102365 | 57443 | 11^{h} 46^{m} 32.25^{s} | −40° 30′ 04.8″ | 4.89 | 5.06 | 30 | G3/G5V | has a refuted planet (b) |
| p Cen | p | | 143 | | 111597 | 62683 | 12^{h} 50^{m} 41.19^{s} | −33° 59′ 57.4″ | 4.90 | −0.48 | 389 | B9V | |
| 191 G. Cen | | | 191 | | 114837 | 64583 | 13^{h} 14^{m} 15.43^{s} | −59° 06′ 10.3″ | 4.90 | 3.62 | 59 | F7IV | |
| c^{2} Cen | c^{2} | | 372 | | 129685 | 72104 | 14^{h} 44^{m} 59.20^{s} | −35° 11′ 30.6″ | 4.92 | 0.91 | 207 | A0V | |
| 58 G. Cen | | | 58 | | 101570 | 56986 | 11^{h} 40^{m} 53.65^{s} | −62° 05′ 24.4″ | 4.93 | −1.82 | 729 | G3Ib | |
| Q Cen | Q | | 250 | | 118991 | 66821 | 13^{h} 41^{m} 44.81^{s} | −54° 33′ 33.7″ | 4.99 | 0.39 | 271 | B8Vn+... | binary star |
| 26 G. Cen | | | 26 | | 98993 | 55588 | 11^{h} 23^{m} 12.70^{s} | −36° 09′ 53.2″ | 5.00 | −2.10 | 858 | K4III | |
| V810 Cen | | | 61 | V810 | 101947 | 57175 | 11^{h} 43^{m} 31.20^{s} | −62° 29′ 21.8″ | 5.00 | −4.48 | 2567 | F9Ia | semiregular variable, V_{max} = 4.95^{m}, V_{min} = 5.12^{m}, P = 130 d |
| F Cen | F | | 108 | | 107079 | 60059 | 12^{h} 18^{m} 59.83^{s} | −55° 08′ 34.7″ | 5.01 | −0.33 | 381 | M1III | |
| V1019 Cen | | | 376 | V1019 | 131120 | 72800 | 14^{h} 52^{m} 51.09^{s} | −37° 48′ 11.2″ | 5.02 | −0.34 | 384 | B7II/III | long-period pulsating variable, ΔV = 0.02^{m} |
| V795 Cen | | | 328 | V795 | 124367 | 69618 | 14^{h} 14^{m} 57.16^{s} | −57° 05′ 09.9″ | 5.03 | −0.84 | 486 | B4Vne | γ Cas variable, V_{max} = 4.97^{m}, V_{min} = 5.10^{m} |
| K Cen | K | | 224 | | 117150 | 65810 | 13^{h} 29^{m} 25.26^{s} | −51° 09′ 54.4″ | 5.04 | −0.91 | 504 | A0V | |
| ο^{1} Cen | ο^{1} | | 37 | | 100261 | 56243 | 11^{h} 31^{m} 46.07^{s} | −59° 26′ 31.4″ | 5.07 | −4.91 | 3228 | G0Ia | semiregular variable, V_{max} = ~4.8^{m}, V_{min} = ~5.6^{m} |
| r Cen | r | | 195 | | 115310 | 64803 | 13^{h} 16^{m} 53.11^{s} | −31° 30′ 21.9″ | 5.10 | 0.70 | 247 | K0III | |
| 217 G. Cen | | | 217 | | 116713 | 65535 | 13^{h} 26^{m} 07.64^{s} | −39° 45′ 17.9″ | 5.11 | 1.09 | 207 | Kp... | |
| ο^{2} Cen | ο^{2} | | 38 | | 100262 | 56250 | 11^{h} 31^{m} 48.81^{s} | −59° 30′ 56.3″ | 5.12 | −4.97 | 3396 | A3Ia | α Cyg variable, ΔV = 0.10^{m}, P = 46.3 d |
| 128 G. Cen | | | 128 | | 109536 | 61468 | 12^{h} 35^{m} 45.61^{s} | −41° 01′ 19.0″ | 5.12 | 2.43 | 113 | A7III | |
| 34 G. Cen | | | 34 | | 99803 | 56000 | 11^{h} 28^{m} 35.11^{s} | −42° 40′ 27.2″ | 5.14 | −1.27 | 625 | B9V | |
| 52 G. Cen | | | 52 | | 101021 | 56656 | 11^{h} 37^{m} 00.80^{s} | −61° 17′ 00.4″ | 5.14 | 0.89 | 231 | K1III | |
| V815 Cen | | | 4 | V815 | 96616 | 54360 | 11^{h} 07^{m} 16.76^{s} | −42° 38′ 19.6″ | 5.15 | 0.45 | 283 | Ap SrCrEu | α² CVn variable, ΔV = 0.03^{m}, P = 2.433 d |
| 54 G. Cen | | | 54 | | 101189 | 56754 | 11^{h} 38^{m} 07.37^{s} | −61° 49′ 35.6″ | 5.15 | 0.35 | 297 | B9IV | |
| 88 G. Cen | | | 88 | | 104731 | 58803 | 12^{h} 03^{m} 39.31^{s} | −42° 26′ 01.6″ | 5.15 | 3.23 | 79 | F6V | |
| z Cen | z | | 267 | | 119921 | 67244 | 13^{h} 46^{m} 56.36^{s} | −36° 15′ 06.9″ | 5.15 | −0.44 | 428 | A0V | |
| H Cen | H | | 156 | V945 | 112409 | 63210 | 12^{h} 57^{m} 04.38^{s} | −51° 11′ 55.4″ | 5.17 | −0.67 | 479 | B8V | V945 Cen; long-period pulsating variable, ΔV = 0.02^{m} |
| 31 G. Cen | | | 31 | | 99453 | 55779 | 11^{h} 25^{m} 43.56^{s} | −63° 58′ 20.3″ | 5.18 | 2.99 | 89 | F7V | |
| 29 G. Cen | | | 29 | | 99322 | 55756 | 11^{h} 25^{m} 29.53^{s} | −36° 03′ 47.2″ | 5.21 | 0.54 | 280 | K0III | |
| 33 G. Cen | | | 33 | | 99556 | 55831 | 11^{h} 26^{m} 35.43^{s} | −61° 06′ 54.6″ | 5.22 | −3.17 | 1552 | B3IV | |
| 334 G. Cen | | | 334 | | 125158 | 70035 | 14^{h} 19^{m} 51.70^{s} | −61° 16′ 21.9″ | 5.22 | 1.80 | 158 | Am | |
| 182 G. Cen | | | 182 | | 114474 | 64348 | 13^{h} 11^{m} 23.31^{s} | −43° 22′ 06.6″ | 5.24 | 1.09 | 221 | K1/K2III | |
| C^{2} Cen | C^{2} | | 45 | | 100825 | 56573 | 11^{h} 35^{m} 55.56^{s} | −47° 38′ 29.5″ | 5.26 | 1.44 | 189 | A7m | |
| N Cen | N | | 277 | | 120642 | 67703 | 13^{h} 52^{m} 04.90^{s} | −52° 48′ 41.3″ | 5.26 | 0.03 | 363 | B9Vn | |
| 64 G. Cen | | | 64 | | 102232 | 57371 | 11^{h} 45^{m} 44.00^{s} | −45° 41′ 24.5″ | 5.28 | −1.62 | 782 | B6III | |
| D Cen | D | | 103 | | 106321 | 59654 | 12^{h} 14^{m} 02.73^{s} | −45° 43′ 26.1″ | 5.31 | −0.89 | 566 | K3III | binary star |
| x^{1} Cen | x^{1} | | 113 | | 107832 | 60449 | 12^{h} 23^{m} 35.45^{s} | −35° 24′ 45.6″ | 5.32 | −0.17 | 409 | B8/B9V | |
| 215 G. Cen | | | 215 | | 116457 | 65479 | 13^{h} 25^{m} 14.14^{s} | −64° 29′ 06.3″ | 5.32 | 2.35 | 128 | F2III | |
| 381 G. Cen | | | 381 | | 131625 | 73049 | 14^{h} 55^{m} 44.69^{s} | −33° 51′ 20.8″ | 5.32 | 0.92 | 247 | A0V | |
| E Cen | E | | 93 | | 105416 | 59184 | 12^{h} 08^{m} 14.73^{s} | −48° 41′ 32.9″ | 5.34 | −0.95 | 590 | A1V | |
| 9 G. Cen | | | 9 | | 97495 | 54746 | 11^{h} 12^{m} 33.15^{s} | −49° 06′ 03.9″ | 5.37 | 1.88 | 163 | A2III | |
| 251 G. Cen | | | 251 | | 118978 | 66849 | 13^{h} 42^{m} 01.12^{s} | −58° 47′ 13.4″ | 5.38 | −1.11 | 647 | B9IV | |
| 41 G. Cen | | | 41 | | 100493 | 56391 | 11^{h} 33^{m} 37.26^{s} | −40° 35′ 12.1″ | 5.39 | 0.13 | 368 | A2IV/V | |
| V918 Cen | | | 68 | V918 | 102461 | 57512 | 11^{h} 47^{m} 19.17^{s} | −57° 41′ 47.6″ | 5.42 | −1.59 | 821 | K5III | semiregular variable, ΔV = ~0.07^{m} |
| u Cen | u | | 122 | | 108541 | 60855 | 12^{h} 28^{m} 22.49^{s} | −39° 02′ 28.1″ | 5.45 | −0.13 | 427 | B8/B9V | |
| C^{3} Cen | C^{3} | | 53 | | 101067 | 56700 | 11^{h} 37^{m} 34.05^{s} | −47° 44′ 50.6″ | 5.46 | 0.23 | 363 | K2III | |
| 152 G. Cen | | | 152 | | 112213 | 63066 | 12^{h} 55^{m} 19.46^{s} | −42° 54′ 56.5″ | 5.46 | −0.87 | 601 | M0III | |
| 269 G. Cen | | | 269 | | 119971 | 67304 | 13^{h} 47^{m} 38.67^{s} | −50° 19′ 14.4″ | 5.46 | −0.26 | 454 | K2III | |
| V964 Cen | | | 202 | V964 | 115823 | 65112 | 13^{h} 20^{m} 37.85^{s} | −52° 44′ 52.0″ | 5.47 | 0.05 | 396 | B6V | β Lyr variable, ΔV = 0.04^{m} |
| 43 G. Cen | | | 43 | | 100708 | 56497 | 11^{h} 34^{m} 57.00^{s} | −49° 08′ 13.0″ | 5.50 | 1.48 | 207 | K1III/IV | |
| V817 Cen | | | 96 | V817 | 105521 | 59232 | 12^{h} 08^{m} 54.60^{s} | −41° 13′ 53.7″ | 5.51 | −3.52 | 2090 | B3IV | γ Cas variable, V_{max} = 5.47^{m}, V_{min} = 5.58^{m} |
| HD 120987 | y | | 286 | | 120987 | 67819 | 13^{h} 53^{m} 32.82^{s} | −35° 39′ 51.1″ | 5.53 | 2.03 | 163 | F3V | quintuple star system |
| 324 G. Cen | | | 324 | | 124147 | 69462 | 14^{h} 13^{m} 16.42^{s} | −53° 39′ 56.3″ | 5.53 | −3.99 | 2608 | K5III+... | |
| 59 G. Cen | | | 59 | | 101615 | 57013 | 11^{h} 41^{m} 19.86^{s} | −43° 05′ 44.4″ | 5.54 | 1.50 | 209 | A0V | |
| 74 G. Cen | | | 74 | | 103101 | 57870 | 11^{h} 52^{m} 10.39^{s} | −56° 59′ 16.2″ | 5.56 | 0.46 | 341 | B4III | |
| 341 G. Cen | | | 341 | | 125745 | 70243 | 14^{h} 22^{m} 19.74^{s} | −34° 47′ 12.4″ | 5.57 | −2.31 | 1230 | B8V | |
| 172 G. Cen | | | 172 | | 113778 | 63972 | 13^{h} 06^{m} 35.05^{s} | −41° 35′ 18.3″ | 5.59 | 0.51 | 339 | K0II/III | |
| 248 G. Cen | | | 248 | | 118799 | 66656 | 13^{h} 39^{m} 48.59^{s} | −40° 03′ 05.7″ | 5.61 | −0.41 | 522 | K2/K3III | |
| 330 G. Cen | | | 330 | | 124433 | 69598 | 14^{h} 14^{m} 42.76^{s} | −41° 50′ 14.8″ | 5.61 | −0.09 | 449 | G8III | |
| 176 G. Cen | | | 176 | | 113852 | 64003 | 13^{h} 06^{m} 54.23^{s} | −35° 51′ 42.6″ | 5.63 | 1.39 | 229 | A0V | |
| 235 G. Cen | | | 235 | | 118261 | 66438 | 13^{h} 37^{m} 12.20^{s} | −61° 41′ 29.7″ | 5.63 | 2.88 | 116 | F6V | |
| 39 G. Cen | | | 39 | | 100378 | 56319 | 11^{h} 32^{m} 48.14^{s} | −40° 26′ 10.8″ | 5.64 | −0.47 | 544 | M1III | |
| C^{1} Cen | C^{1} | | 44 | V763 | 100733 | 56518 | 11^{h} 35^{m} 13.36^{s} | −47° 22′ 21.2″ | 5.64 | −0.87 | 652 | M3III | V763 Cen; semiregular variable, V_{max} = 5.55^{m}, V_{min} = 5.80^{m}, P = 60 d |
| 288 G. Cen | | | 288 | | 121190 | 67973 | 13^{h} 55^{m} 12.17^{s} | −52° 09′ 38.8″ | 5.66 | 0.56 | 342 | B8V | |
| 367 G. Cen | | | 367 | | 128974 | 71783 | 14^{h} 41^{m} 01.41^{s} | −36° 08′ 05.4″ | 5.67 | −0.61 | 588 | Ap Si | |
| 70 G. Cen | | | 70 | | 102878 | 57741 | 11^{h} 50^{m} 27.28^{s} | −62° 38′ 57.8″ | 5.68 | −4.19 | 3075 | A3Iab | |
| 221 G. Cen | | | 221 | | 116835 | 65593 | 13^{h} 26^{m} 56.12^{s} | −41° 29′ 51.2″ | 5.69 | −3.26 | 2012 | K3III | |
| 142 G. Cen | | | 142 | | 111588 | 62703 | 12^{h} 50^{m} 57.90^{s} | −52° 47′ 14.6″ | 5.70 | 0.35 | 382 | A5V | |
| 177 G. Cen | | | 177 | | 113902 | 64053 | 13^{h} 07^{m} 38.32^{s} | −53° 27′ 35.0″ | 5.70 | 0.71 | 324 | B8V | |
| x^{2} Cen | x^{2} | | 118 | | 108114 | 60610 | 12^{h} 25^{m} 21.76^{s} | −35° 11′ 11.0″ | 5.71 | 0.16 | 420 | B9IV/V | |
| V744 Cen | | | 246 | V744 | 118767 | 66666 | 13^{h} 39^{m} 59.90^{s} | −49° 57′ 00.0″ | 5.74 | −0.37 | 543 | M8III | semiregular variable, V_{max} = 5.14^{m}, V_{min} = 6.55^{m}, P = 90 d |
| 359 G. Cen | | | 359 | | 128207 | 71453 | 14^{h} 36^{m} 44.15^{s} | −40° 12′ 41.5″ | 5.74 | 0.19 | 419 | B8V | |
| 13 G. Cen | | | 13 | | 97651 | 54840 | 11^{h} 13^{m} 39.41^{s} | −53° 13′ 54.9″ | 5.75 | 0.07 | 446 | K2III | |
| V788 Cen | | | 95 | V788 | 105509 | 59229 | 12^{h} 08^{m} 53.84^{s} | −44° 19′ 33.2″ | 5.75 | 0.75 | 326 | A3III | Algol variable, V_{max} = 5.74^{m}, V_{min} = 5.93^{m}, P = 4.96638 d |
| 127 G. Cen | | | 127 | | 109409 | 61379 | 12^{h} 34^{m} 42.46^{s} | −44° 40′ 21.1″ | 5.76 | 3.50 | 92 | G4IV | |
| 205 G. Cen | | | 205 | | 115912 | 65144 | 13^{h} 20^{m} 57.76^{s} | −46° 52′ 48.2″ | 5.76 | 0.44 | 377 | K1III | |
| 11 G. Cen | | | 11 | | 97576 | 54811 | 11^{h} 13^{m} 14.69^{s} | −44° 22′ 20.0″ | 5.77 | −1.29 | 840 | K5/M0III | |
| 102 G. Cen | | | 102 | | 106231 | 59607 | 12^{h} 13^{m} 25.06^{s} | −38° 55′ 45.0″ | 5.77 | −3.21 | 2037 | B4III | |
| 278 G. Cen | | | 278 | | 120640 | 67663 | 13^{h} 51^{m} 47.23^{s} | −46° 53′ 55.1″ | 5.77 | −2.01 | 1173 | B2Vp | |
| 129 G. Cen | | | 129 | | 109573 | 61498 | 12^{h} 36^{m} 01.07^{s} | −39° 52′ 10.0″ | 5.78 | 1.65 | 219 | A0V | |
| 181 G. Cen | | | 181 | | 114435 | 64332 | 13^{h} 11^{m} 08.94^{s} | −42° 13′ 58.2″ | 5.78 | 0.97 | 299 | F7IV | |
| 114 G. Cen | | | 114 | | 107860 | 60463 | 12^{h} 23^{m} 44.79^{s} | −38° 54′ 40.9″ | 5.79 | 0.68 | 342 | B8/B9V | |
| 243 G. Cen | | | 243 | | 118666 | 66681 | 13^{h} 40^{m} 10.80^{s} | −64° 34′ 35.6″ | 5.79 | 1.59 | 226 | F3III-IV | |
| 32 G. Cen | | | 32 | | 99574 | 55849 | 11^{h} 26^{m} 47.30^{s} | −53° 09′ 35.8″ | 5.80 | −0.61 | 625 | K0III+... | |
| 209 G. Cen | | | 209 | | 116084 | 65247 | 13^{h} 22^{m} 16.29^{s} | −52° 10′ 58.6″ | 5.81 | −5.19 | 5175 | B2.5Ib | |
| 27 G. Cen | | | 27 | | 99022 | 55581 | 11^{h} 23^{m} 08.17^{s} | −56° 46′ 45.7″ | 5.82 | −0.69 | 653 | A4:p | |
| 196 G. Cen | | | 196 | | 115331 | 64822 | 13^{h} 17^{m} 13.92^{s} | −43° 58′ 46.0″ | 5.82 | 1.99 | 190 | Am | |
| 293 G. Cen | | | 293 | | 121416 | 68079 | 13^{h} 56^{m} 19.89^{s} | −46° 35′ 33.8″ | 5.82 | 1.12 | 284 | K0IV | |
| V767 Cen | | | 285 | V767 | 120991 | 67861 | 13^{h} 53^{m} 57.25^{s} | −47° 07′ 41.4″ | 5.83 | | | B2IIIe | γ Cas variable, ΔV = 0.4^{m} |
| 50 G. Cen | | | 50 | | 100929 | 56606 | 11^{h} 36^{m} 22.38^{s} | −61° 03′ 08.8″ | 5.84 | −2.42 | 1462 | B2.5IV | |
| 133 G. Cen | | | 133 | | 110287 | 61916 | 12^{h} 41^{m} 23.04^{s} | −46° 08′ 44.6″ | 5.84 | −1.10 | 797 | K3II | |
| 193 G. Cen | | | 193 | | 114971 | 64623 | 13^{h} 14^{m} 43.36^{s} | −48° 57′ 24.5″ | 5.84 | 1.34 | 259 | K0IV | |
| 380 G. Cen | | | 380 | | 131432 | 72959 | 14^{h} 54^{m} 37.92^{s} | −33° 18′ 02.0″ | 5.85 | −1.10 | 801 | K2III | |
| 30 G. Cen | | | 30 | | 99333 | 55763 | 11^{h} 25^{m} 33.13^{s} | −37° 44′ 51.2″ | 5.87 | −0.23 | 541 | M3III | |
| 140 G. Cen | | | 140 | | 111032 | 62360 | 12^{h} 46^{m} 46.22^{s} | −33° 18′ 55.5″ | 5.87 | 0.52 | 384 | K3III | |
| 283 G. Cen | | | 283 | | 120908 | 67836 | 13^{h} 53^{m} 43.11^{s} | −53° 22′ 23.8″ | 5.87 | −1.97 | 1203 | B5III | |
| 357 G. Cen | | | 357 | | 127971 | 71353 | 14^{h} 35^{m} 31.50^{s} | −41° 31′ 02.6″ | 5.88 | 0.68 | 358 | B6V | |
| 388 G. Cen | | | 388 | | 132604 | 73493 | 15^{h} 01^{m} 13.07^{s} | −38° 03′ 29.9″ | 5.88 | 0.51 | 387 | K2/K3III | |
| 79 G. Cen | | | 79 | | 103516 | 58103 | 11^{h} 55^{m} 00.02^{s} | −63° 16′ 45.0″ | 5.89 | −3.59 | 2567 | A3Ib | |
| 151 G. Cen | | | 151 | | 112164 | 63033 | 12^{h} 54^{m} 58.71^{s} | −44° 09′ 05.1″ | 5.89 | 2.89 | 130 | G2IV | |
| 375 G. Cen | | | 375 | | 130328 | 72432 | 14^{h} 48^{m} 38.06^{s} | −36° 38′ 04.5″ | 5.89 | 0.19 | 449 | M5III | |
| 189 G. Cen | | | 189 | | 114772 | 64515 | 13^{h} 13^{m} 23.38^{s} | −50° 41′ 59.2″ | 5.90 | 0.88 | 329 | B9V | |
| 373 G. Cen | | | 373 | | 130055 | 72296 | 14^{h} 47^{m} 05.06^{s} | −38° 17′ 25.6″ | 5.90 | −0.25 | 554 | K3III | |
| 148 G. Cen | | | 148 | | 111884 | 62861 | 12^{h} 53^{m} 04.26^{s} | −54° 57′ 08.9″ | 5.91 | 0.59 | 379 | K3III | |
| 190 G. Cen | | | 190 | | 114835 | 64580 | 13^{h} 14^{m} 12.15^{s} | −58° 41′ 02.1″ | 5.91 | 0.80 | 344 | K0/K1III | |
| 239 G. Cen | | | 239 | | 118354 | 66454 | 13^{h} 37^{m} 23.50^{s} | −46° 25′ 40.2″ | 5.91 | 0.52 | 389 | B8V | |
| 268 G. Cen | | | 268 | | 119938 | 67292 | 13^{h} 47^{m} 27.58^{s} | −50° 14′ 57.6″ | 5.92 | 2.03 | 196 | A3m... | |
| 298 G. Cen | | | 298 | | 121853 | 68333 | 13^{h} 59^{m} 17.46^{s} | −50° 22′ 10.6″ | 5.92 | 0.86 | 335 | G8/K0III | |
| 305 G. Cen | | | 305 | | 122438 | 68670 | 14^{h} 03^{m} 26.58^{s} | −56° 12′ 48.2″ | 5.93 | −0.13 | 530 | K2III | |
| 337 G. Cen | | | 337 | | 125283 | 69995 | 14^{h} 19^{m} 23.91^{s} | −37° 00′ 10.1″ | 5.93 | 1.75 | 223 | A1V | |
| V914 Cen | | | 57 | V914 | 101541 | 56970 | 11^{h} 40^{m} 42.49^{s} | −53° 58′ 06.8″ | 5.95 | −1.62 | 1065 | M1III | irregular variable, ΔV = ~0.13^{m} |
| 236 G. Cen | | | 236 | | 118338 | 66427 | 13^{h} 37^{m} 06.05^{s} | −44° 08′ 35.4″ | 5.96 | 0.65 | 376 | G8/K0III | |
| 256 G. Cen | | | 256 | | 119250 | 66924 | 13^{h} 42^{m} 55.06^{s} | −41° 24′ 03.4″ | 5.96 | 0.79 | 352 | K0III | |
| 258 G. Cen | | | 258 | | 119361 | 66984 | 13^{h} 43^{m} 40.10^{s} | −42° 04′ 03.0″ | 5.96 | −2.48 | 1590 | B8III | |
| V869 Cen | | | 320 | V869 | 123515 | 69174 | 14^{h} 09^{m} 35.06^{s} | −51° 30′ 16.7″ | 5.96 | −0.17 | 548 | B9IV | spectroscopic binary; unique variable, ΔV = 0.09^{m} |
| 60 G. Cen | | | 60 | | 101883 | 57165 | 11^{h} 43^{m} 27.20^{s} | −37° 11′ 24.4″ | 5.98 | −0.34 | 598 | K3III | |
| 174 G. Cen | | | 174 | | 113823 | 64033 | 13^{h} 07^{m} 24.31^{s} | −59° 51′ 37.8″ | 5.98 | −1.91 | 1235 | B9IV+... | |
| 145 G. Cen | | | 145 | | 111774 | 62786 | 12^{h} 51^{m} 56.95^{s} | −39° 40′ 49.4″ | 5.99 | 0.22 | 465 | B7/B8V | |
| 351 G. Cen | | | 351 | | 127193 | 70987 | 14^{h} 31^{m} 10.84^{s} | −38° 52′ 11.2″ | 5.99 | 0.86 | 346 | K1III | |
| V928 Cen | | | 123 | V928 | 108759 | 60979 | 12^{h} 29^{m} 57.88^{s} | −41° 44′ 09.1″ | 6.00 | −1.25 | 918 | M2II/III | semiregular variable, ΔV = ~0.07^{m} |
| 203 G. Cen | | | 203 | | 115842 | 65129 | 13^{h} 20^{m} 48.34^{s} | −55° 48′ 02.5″ | 6.00 | | | B0.5Ia | |
| 242 G. Cen | | | 242 | | 118520 | 66575 | 13^{h} 38^{m} 48.96^{s} | −57° 37′ 21.7″ | 6.00 | −1.89 | 1235 | G5Ib | |
| 253 G. Cen | | | 253 | | 119159 | 66925 | 13^{h} 42^{m} 56.12^{s} | −56° 46′ 04.7″ | 6.00 | −3.85 | 3047 | B0.5III | |
| 291 G. Cen | | | 291 | | 121384 | 68101 | 13^{h} 56^{m} 32.99^{s} | −54° 42′ 14.8″ | 6.00 | 3.09 | 124 | G8V | |
| 162 G. Cen | | | 162 | | 112935 | 63490 | 13^{h} 00^{m} 32.71^{s} | −33° 30′ 18.3″ | 6.01 | 3.00 | 131 | F3V | |
| 85 G. Cen | | | 85 | | 104081 | 58453 | 11^{h} 59^{m} 10.88^{s} | −51° 41′ 48.3″ | 6.04 | −1.04 | 849 | K1/K2II | |
| 361 G. Cen | | | 361 | | 128488 | 71581 | 14^{h} 38^{m} 19.34^{s} | −38° 47′ 38.9″ | 6.04 | −0.38 | 627 | K3III | |
| 76 G. Cen | | | 76 | | 103400 | 58041 | 11^{h} 54^{m} 11.51^{s} | −57° 24′ 36.7″ | 6.05 | −2.07 | 1370 | A0/A1III | |
| V824 Cen | | | 179 | V824 | 114365 | 64320 | 13^{h} 10^{m} 58.47^{s} | −52° 34′ 00.7″ | 6.05 | 0.94 | 343 | Ap | α² CVn variable, ΔV = 0.035^{m}, P = 1.272 d |
| 3 Cen B | k | 3 | 281 | | 120710 | | 13^{h} 51^{m} 50.10^{s} | −32° 59′ 41.0″ | 6.06 | | | | component of the 3 Cen system |
| 383 G. Cen | | | 383 | | 131774 | 73107 | 14^{h} 56^{m} 30.87^{s} | −32° 38′ 12.2″ | 6.06 | −0.08 | 551 | K3III | |
| 97 G. Cen | | | 97 | | 105776 | 59353 | 12^{h} 10^{m} 33.78^{s} | −37° 52′ 13.0″ | 6.07 | 1.79 | 234 | A5V | |
| 352 G. Cen | | | 352 | | 127624 | 71154 | 14^{h} 33^{m} 09.62^{s} | −30° 42′ 53.9″ | 6.07 | 0.56 | 412 | K0III | |
| V828 Cen | | | 307 | V828 | 122532 | 68673 | 14^{h} 03^{m} 27.49^{s} | −41° 25′ 23.9″ | 6.08 | −0.06 | 552 | B8 Si | α² CVn variable, ΔV = 0.045^{m}, P = 1.837 d |
| V716 Cen | | | 325 | V716 | 124195 | 69491 | 14^{h} 13^{m} 39.84^{s} | −54° 37′ 32.2″ | 6.09 | −1.55 | 1101 | B5V | β Lyr variable, V_{max} = 5.96^{m}, V_{min} = 6.52^{m}, P = 1.49010 d |
| 25 G. Cen | | | 25 | | 98892 | 55528 | 11^{h} 22^{m} 23.15^{s} | −44° 38′ 45.1″ | 6.10 | 0.99 | 344 | G8III | |
| 62 G. Cen | | | 62 | | 101995 | 57211 | 11^{h} 43^{m} 52.82^{s} | −62° 52′ 41.7″ | 6.10 | 0.68 | 396 | A2III/IV | |
| HD 108063 | | | 117 | | 108063 | 60591 | 12^{h} 25^{m} 08.62^{s} | −42° 30′ 51.3″ | 6.10 | 2.49 | 172 | F9.5IV | Extremely metal-rich |
| 282 G. Cen | | | 282 | | 120759 | 67696 | 13^{h} 52^{m} 01.00^{s} | −31° 37′ 08.9″ | 6.11 | 2.46 | 175 | F5/F6V | |
| 10 G. Cen | | | 10 | | 97550 | 54783 | 11^{h} 12^{m} 56.74^{s} | −49° 44′ 10.0″ | 6.12 | −0.72 | 760 | G8II/III | |
| 302 G. Cen | | | 302 | | 122210 | 68493 | 14^{h} 01^{m} 19.08^{s} | −40° 13′ 19.0″ | 6.12 | −0.84 | 805 | K1III | |
| 28 G. Cen | | | 28 | | 99171 | 55667 | 11^{h} 24^{m} 22.06^{s} | −42° 40′ 08.8″ | 6.13 | −3.74 | 3075 | B2IV-V | |
| 80 G. Cen | | | 80 | | 103637 | 58177 | 11^{h} 55^{m} 54.73^{s} | −39° 41′ 22.1″ | 6.13 | 0.27 | 484 | K0III | |
| 358 G. Cen | | | 358 | | 128152 | 71429 | 14^{h} 36^{m} 24.14^{s} | −39° 35′ 50.5″ | 6.13 | 0.69 | 400 | K1III | |
| 229 G. Cen | | | 229 | | 117597 | 66019 | 13^{h} 32^{m} 05.39^{s} | −38° 23′ 55.5″ | 6.14 | 0.91 | 363 | K1III | |
| 290 G. Cen | | | 290 | | 121336 | 68080 | 13^{h} 56^{m} 19.99^{s} | −54° 07′ 56.5″ | 6.14 | 0.37 | 466 | A1V | |
| 106 G. Cen | | | 106 | | 106922 | 59950 | 12^{h} 17^{m} 47.29^{s} | −36° 05′ 38.3″ | 6.15 | 0.27 | 488 | A0V | |
| 67 G. Cen | | | 67 | | 102397 | 57497 | 11^{h} 47^{m} 07.02^{s} | −35° 54′ 24.5″ | 6.16 | 0.34 | 475 | G8III | |
| 192 G. Cen | | | 192 | | 114873 | 64557 | 13^{h} 13^{m} 57.80^{s} | −43° 08′ 21.0″ | 6.16 | 1.00 | 351 | K5II | |
| 194 G. Cen | | | 194 | | 115050 | 64651 | 13^{h} 15^{m} 09.49^{s} | −36° 22′ 16.9″ | 6.17 | 0.40 | 464 | K1III | |
| 213 G. Cen | | | 213 | | 116278 | 65311 | 13^{h} 23^{m} 08.64^{s} | −33° 11′ 23.6″ | 6.17 | −0.58 | 731 | M2III | |
| HD 121056 | | | 287 | | 121056 | 67851 | 13^{h} 53^{m} 52.0^{s} | −35° 18′ 52″ | 6.17 | 2.13 | 215 | K0III | has two planets |
| 384 G. Cen | | | 384 | | 132096 | 73279 | 14^{h} 58^{m} 36.59^{s} | −39° 54′ 25.1″ | 6.17 | 0.92 | 365 | K1III | |
| V790 Cen | | | | V790 | 116072 | | 13^{h} 22^{m} 35.7^{s} | −60° 58′ 20.0″ | 6.18 | | | B2.5Vn | β Cep variable, V_{max} = 6.16^{m}, V_{min} = 6.27^{m} |
| 186 G. Cen | | | 186 | | 114630 | 64478 | 13^{h} 12^{m} 55.71^{s} | −59° 48′ 58.8″ | 6.18 | 3.18 | 130 | G0V | |
| 198 G. Cen | | | 198 | | 115529 | 64933 | 13^{h} 18^{m} 34.89^{s} | −51° 17′ 08.7″ | 6.18 | −0.30 | 644 | A0V | |
| 211 G. Cen | | | 211 | | 116197 | 65288 | 13^{h} 22^{m} 52.50^{s} | −47° 56′ 35.6″ | 6.18 | −1.24 | 994 | A4V | |
| 306 G. Cen | | | 306 | | 122510 | 68641 | 14^{h} 03^{m} 01.71^{s} | −31° 41′ 03.1″ | 6.18 | 3.27 | 125 | F6V | |
| 312 G. Cen | | | 312 | | 123004 | 68872 | 14^{h} 06^{m} 10.91^{s} | −43° 05′ 29.8″ | 6.18 | 0.00 | 561 | G8III | |
| 187 G. Cen | | | 187 | | 114707 | 64472 | 13^{h} 12^{m} 50.86^{s} | −42° 41′ 59.0″ | 6.19 | −0.24 | 629 | K0III | |
| 319 G. Cen | | | 319 | | 123445 | 69113 | 14^{h} 08^{m} 51.90^{s} | −43° 28′ 14.7″ | 6.19 | −0.51 | 713 | B9V | |
| 200 G. Cen | | | 200 | | 115778 | 65108 | 13^{h} 20^{m} 35.06^{s} | −59° 46′ 21.9″ | 6.20 | 0.80 | 392 | F3/F5II | |
| V992 Cen | | | 309 | V992 | 122844 | 68842 | 14^{h} 05^{m} 46.53^{s} | −54° 40′ 09.5″ | 6.20 | 0.62 | 425 | A5III/IV | β Lyr variable, ΔV = ~0.09^{m} |
| 389 G. Cen | | | 389 | | 132763 | 73559 | 15^{h} 01^{m} 58.10^{s} | −34° 21′ 31.7″ | 6.21 | 0.81 | 393 | A8/A9III/IV | |
| 15 G. Cen | | | 15 | | 97866 | 54929 | 11^{h} 14^{m} 54.13^{s} | −43° 44′ 01.3″ | 6.22 | −2.40 | 1725 | K4III | |
| | | | | | 100826 | 56550 | 11^{h} 35^{m} 42.34^{s} | −61° 17′ 16.3″ | 6.23 | −4.42 | 4405 | A0Ib | |
| 100 G. Cen | | | 100 | | 105920 | 59439 | 12^{h} 11^{m} 31.67^{s} | −51° 21′ 33.0″ | 6.23 | 2.59 | 174 | G6III+... | |
| 20 G. Cen | | | 20 | | 98161 | 55130 | 11^{h} 17^{m} 12.06^{s} | −38° 00′ 51.8″ | 6.24 | 1.96 | 234 | A1V | |
| 104 G. Cen | | | 104 | | 106572 | 59785 | 12^{h} 15^{m} 30.71^{s} | −41° 54′ 46.2″ | 6.24 | 1.10 | 347 | K0III | |
| 116 G. Cen | | | 116 | | 107998 | 60549 | 12^{h} 24^{m} 44.77^{s} | −41° 23′ 02.8″ | 6.24 | 0.32 | 498 | K2/K3III | |
| V789 Cen | | | 167 | V789 | 113523 | 63820 | 13^{h} 04^{m} 48.25^{s} | −41° 11′ 46.6″ | 6.24 | −1.54 | 1173 | M3/M4III | irregular variable, ΔV = 0.09^{m} |
| 120 G. Cen | | | 120 | | 108309 | 60729 | 12^{h} 26^{m} 48.71^{s} | −48° 54′ 46.8″ | 6.25 | 4.12 | 87 | G5IV-V | |
| 63 G. Cen | | | 63 | | 102150 | 57322 | 11^{h} 45^{m} 12.66^{s} | −49° 04′ 11.5″ | 6.26 | 0.24 | 521 | K1III | |
| 81 G. Cen | | | 81 | | 103746 | 58242 | 11^{h} 56^{m} 44.02^{s} | −47° 04′ 20.8″ | 6.26 | 2.60 | 176 | F3IV-V | |
| 141 G. Cen | | | 141 | | 111519 | 62655 | 12^{h} 50^{m} 19.53^{s} | −48° 27′ 34.4″ | 6.26 | 0.04 | 571 | A0V | |
| 147 G. Cen | | | 147 | | 111790 | 62821 | 12^{h} 52^{m} 24.61^{s} | −53° 49′ 47.7″ | 6.26 | −1.36 | 1090 | G8Ib/II | |
| 7 G. Cen | | | 7 | | 97413 | 54718 | 11^{h} 12^{m} 10.24^{s} | −46° 16′ 00.4″ | 6.27 | 1.29 | 322 | A1V | binary star |
| 222 G. Cen | | | 222 | | 116862 | 65630 | 13^{h} 27^{m} 20.66^{s} | −49° 22′ 52.6″ | 6.27 | −2.98 | 2312 | B3IV | |
| 2 G. Cen | | | 2 | | 96407 | 54264 | 11^{h} 06^{m} 05.74^{s} | −51° 12′ 45.9″ | 6.28 | 0.77 | 412 | G6IV | |
| V809 Cen | | | 36 | V809 | 100198 | 56201 | 11^{h} 31^{m} 15.05^{s} | −61° 16′ 42.5″ | 6.28 | −4.49 | 4657 | A3Iae | α Cyg variable, ΔV = 0.05^{m} |
| V765 Cen | | | 247 | V765 | 118781 | 66645 | 13^{h} 39^{m} 40.85^{s} | −39° 44′ 51.2″ | 6.29 | −1.39 | 1120 | M3/M4III | irregular variable, ΔV = 0.08^{m} |
| 19 G. Cen | | | 19 | | 98096 | 55068 | 11^{h} 16^{m} 27.94^{s} | −45° 52′ 48.6″ | 6.30 | 2.58 | 181 | F3V | |
| 49 G. Cen | | | 49 | | 100911 | 56632 | 11^{h} 36^{m} 40.74^{s} | −37° 14′ 13.9″ | 6.30 | 0.69 | 432 | A1V | |
| 365 G. Cen | | | 365 | | 128713 | 71746 | 14^{h} 40^{m} 32.77^{s} | −56° 26′ 26.7″ | 6.30 | −1.15 | 1006 | K0/K1II | |
| 377 G. Cen | | | 377 | | 131117 | 72772 | 14^{h} 52^{m} 33.33^{s} | −30° 34′ 37.8″ | 6.30 | 3.29 | 130 | G0/G1V | |
| 3 G. Cen | | | 3 | | 96484 | 54291 | 11^{h} 06^{m} 27.57^{s} | −50° 57′ 24.3″ | 6.31 | 1.05 | 367 | K2II | |
| 144 G. Cen | | | 144 | | 111775 | 62799 | 12^{h} 52^{m} 05.47^{s} | −48° 05′ 39.5″ | 6.31 | 0.48 | 479 | A0IV | |
| 220 G. Cen | | | 220 | | 116836 | 65606 | 13^{h} 27^{m} 06.40^{s} | −49° 08′ 37.3″ | 6.31 | −1.27 | 1069 | A0III/IV | |
| 332 G. Cen | | | 332 | | 124580 | 69671 | 14^{h} 15^{m} 38.58^{s} | −45° 00′ 01.5″ | 6.31 | 4.69 | 69 | F9V | |
| | | | | | 101545 | 56961 | 11^{h} 40^{m} 37.01^{s} | −62° 34′ 05.2″ | 6.32 | −3.36 | 2810 | O9.5Ib | |
| 180 G. Cen | | | 180 | | 114461 | 64395 | 13^{h} 11^{m} 53.07^{s} | −63° 18′ 10.7″ | 6.32 | | | F0II | |
| 232 G. Cen | | | 232 | | 117919 | 66236 | 13^{h} 34^{m} 28.99^{s} | −48° 16′ 19.7″ | 6.32 | −0.42 | 726 | B8III | |
| 347 G. Cen | | | 347 | | 126386 | 70580 | 14^{h} 26^{m} 13.53^{s} | −42° 19′ 06.5″ | 6.33 | 1.41 | 314 | K3III | |
| 279 G. Cen | | | 279 | | 120672 | 67648 | 13^{h} 51^{m} 36.58^{s} | −36° 25′ 58.8″ | 6.34 | 2.45 | 195 | F6V | |
| V883 Cen | | | 318 | V883 | 123335 | 69122 | 14^{h} 08^{m} 56.27^{s} | −59° 16′ 36.0″ | 6.34 | −1.24 | 1069 | B5IV | eclipsing binary, V_{max} = ~6.3^{m}, V_{min} = ~6.6^{m} |
| 84 G. Cen | | | 84 | | 104080 | 58452 | 11^{h} 59^{m} 10.71^{s} | −45° 49′ 55.9″ | 6.36 | 0.49 | 487 | B8/B9V | |
| 348 G. Cen | | | 348 | | 126475 | 70626 | 14^{h} 26^{m} 49.89^{s} | −39° 52′ 26.2″ | 6.36 | 0.62 | 458 | B9V | |
| 382 G. Cen | | | 382 | | 131752 | 73116 | 14^{h} 56^{m} 35.78^{s} | −39° 24′ 57.5″ | 6.36 | 0.96 | 393 | A0/A1V | |
| 210 G. Cen | | | 210 | | 116226 | 65303 | 13^{h} 23^{m} 02.61^{s} | −48° 33′ 46.0″ | 6.37 | −2.33 | 1791 | B6IV | |
| 126 G. Cen | | | 126 | | 109312 | 61328 | 12^{h} 33^{m} 59.26^{s} | −49° 54′ 34.9″ | 6.38 | 2.24 | 220 | F5IV-V | |
| 138 G. Cen | | | 138 | | 110653 | 62128 | 12^{h} 43^{m} 58.66^{s} | −36° 20′ 56.9″ | 6.38 | −0.99 | 973 | B8/B9V | |
| 369 G. Cen | | | 369 | | 129161 | 71853 | 14^{h} 41^{m} 51.25^{s} | −30° 55′ 59.2″ | 6.38 | −1.22 | 1079 | Asp... | |
| 112 G. Cen | | | 112 | | 107833 | 60454 | 12^{h} 23^{m} 36.76^{s} | −39° 18′ 08.5″ | 6.39 | 1.01 | 389 | F2V | |
| 310 G. Cen | | | 310 | | 122879 | 68902 | 14^{h} 06^{m} 25.16^{s} | −59° 42′ 57.2″ | 6.39 | | | B0Ia | |
| 313 G. Cen | | | 313 | | 123151 | 69065 | 14^{h} 08^{m} 14.27^{s} | −63° 12′ 28.9″ | 6.39 | 1.03 | 384 | G8/K0III | |
| R Cen | | | 331 | R | 124601 | | 14^{h} 16^{m} 34.20^{s} | −59° 54′ 50.0″ | 6.39 | | | | Mira variable, V_{max} = 5.3^{m}, V_{min} = 11.8^{m}, P = 546.2 d; H_{2}O maser |
| 350 G. Cen | | | 350 | | 127152 | 70966 | 14^{h} 30^{m} 56.63^{s} | −40° 50′ 42.4″ | 6.39 | −1.15 | 1048 | K3III | |
| 354 G. Cen | | | 354 | | 127724 | 71333 | 14^{h} 35^{m} 17.08^{s} | −60° 00′ 56.1″ | 6.39 | 0.03 | 609 | K2III | |
| 130 G. Cen | | | 130 | | 109675 | 61557 | 12^{h} 36^{m} 46.65^{s} | −50° 20′ 07.3″ | 6.40 | 1.19 | 359 | A0V | |
| 223 G. Cen | | | 223 | | 116873 | 65621 | 13^{h} 27^{m} 14.67^{s} | −40° 09′ 45.7″ | 6.40 | 0.69 | 452 | G8/K0III | |
| V766 Cen | | | 264 | V766 | 119796 | 67261 | 13^{h} 47^{m} 10.87^{s} | −62° 35′ 22.9″ | 6.40 | −6.36 | 11643 | A7V | S Doradus variable, V_{max} = 6.17^{m}, V_{min} = 7.50^{m} |
| 329 G. Cen | | | 329 | | 124454 | 69655 | 14^{h} 15^{m} 21.33^{s} | −53° 30′ 35.7″ | 6.40 | −0.99 | 979 | K3III | |
| 238 G. Cen | | | 238 | | 118384 | 66521 | 13^{h} 38^{m} 07.63^{s} | −58° 24′ 52.5″ | 6.41 | 0.60 | 472 | K1III | |
| 263 G. Cen | | | 263 | | 119727 | 67199 | 13^{h} 46^{m} 14.54^{s} | −54° 40′ 59.9″ | 6.42 | 1.35 | 337 | A1V | |
| 137 G. Cen | | | 137 | | 110575 | 62081 | 12^{h} 43^{m} 26.24^{s} | −40° 10′ 40.1″ | 6.43 | 2.15 | 235 | A7III | |
| V1154 Cen | | | 169 | V1154 | 113602 | 63883 | 13^{h} 05^{m} 30.83^{s} | −52° 06′ 56.5″ | 6.43 | −1.21 | 1101 | M1III | semiregular variable, V_{max} = 6.33^{m}, V_{min} = 6.58^{m}, P = 21.8 d |
| 254 G. Cen | | | 254 | | 119193 | 66923 | 13^{h} 42^{m} 54.64^{s} | −50° 47′ 24.7″ | 6.43 | −0.89 | 948 | M0III | |
| HD 120457 | | | 275 | | 120457 | 67537 | 13^{h} 50^{m} 19.39^{s} | −39° 54′ 03.0″ | 6.43 | 1.17 | 367 | K1III | has a planet |
| 317 G. Cen | | | 317 | | 123247 | 69011 | 14^{h} 07^{m} 40.84^{s} | −48° 42′ 14.3″ | 6.43 | 1.41 | 330 | B9V | |
| 5 G. Cen | | | 5 | | 96660 | 54380 | 11^{h} 07^{m} 34.15^{s} | −48° 38′ 24.1″ | 6.44 | 0.29 | 553 | K3III | |
| 168 G. Cen | | | 168 | | 113537 | 63849 | 13^{h} 05^{m} 06.70^{s} | −47° 07′ 00.6″ | 6.44 | 1.20 | 364 | F5III | |
| V827 Cen | | | 259 | V827 | 119419 | 67036 | 13^{h} 44^{m} 16.03^{s} | −51° 00′ 44.7″ | 6.44 | 1.18 | 367 | A0p | α² CVn variable, ΔV = 0.025^{m}, P = 2.605 d |
| V808 Cen | | | 35 | V808 | 99953 | 56050 | 11^{h} 29^{m} 15.14^{s} | −63° 33′ 14.2″ | 6.45 | −4.45 | 4939 | B2Ia | α Cyg variable, V_{max} = 6.42^{m}, V_{min} = 6.47^{m} |
| 316 G. Cen | | | 316 | | 123227 | 69012 | 14^{h} 07^{m} 41.56^{s} | −49° 52′ 04.3″ | 6.45 | 3.42 | 132 | G3V | |
| 386 G. Cen | | | 386 | | 132238 | 73341 | 14^{h} 59^{m} 13.94^{s} | −37° 52′ 52.3″ | 6.45 | 0.03 | 626 | B8V | |
| 22 G. Cen | | | 22 | | 98176 | 55133 | 11^{h} 17^{m} 14.37^{s} | −41° 56′ 03.5″ | 6.46 | 1.01 | 401 | A0V | |
| V871 Cen | | | | V871 | 101205 | 56769 | 11^{h} 38^{m} 20.37^{s} | −63° 22′ 21.9″ | 6.46 | | | O8var | β Lyr variable, ΔV = 0.12^{m} |
| 77 G. Cen | | | 77 | | 103437 | 58057 | 11^{h} 54^{m} 26.06^{s} | −37° 44′ 56.7″ | 6.46 | 3.12 | 152 | F7V | |
| 233 G. Cen | | | 233 | | 118010 | 66254 | 13^{h} 34^{m} 43.61^{s} | −33° 18′ 39.0″ | 6.46 | −0.75 | 903 | K2III | |
| 349 G. Cen | | | 349 | | 126610 | 70798 | 14^{h} 28^{m} 43.50^{s} | −59° 11′ 51.1″ | 6.46 | | | A0II/III | |
| 90 G. Cen | | | 90 | | 104839 | 58859 | 12^{h} 04^{m} 16.74^{s} | −51° 28′ 21.0″ | 6.48 | 1.10 | 388 | B9V | |
| 155 G. Cen | | | 155 | | 112381 | 63204 | 12^{h} 56^{m} 58.26^{s} | −54° 35′ 14.3″ | 6.48 | 1.46 | 329 | A0p | |
| | | | | | 116338 | 65372 | 13^{h} 23^{m} 52.19^{s} | −49° 49′ 21.8″ | 6.48 | 0.91 | 424 | G8III | |
| 237 G. Cen | | | 237 | | 118319 | 66405 | 13^{h} 36^{m} 50.58^{s} | −34° 28′ 03.9″ | 6.48 | 0.47 | 519 | K0III | |
| 299 G. Cen | | | 299 | | 121901 | 68413 | 14^{h} 00^{m} 17.47^{s} | −61° 28′ 51.4″ | 6.49 | 2.42 | 213 | F1III-IV | |
| | | | | | 99145 | 55645 | 11^{h} 23^{m} 56.54^{s} | −57° 52′ 49.4″ | 6.50 | 0.32 | 561 | M0III | |
| 89 G. Cen | | | 89 | | 104747 | 58799 | 12^{h} 03^{m} 36.62^{s} | −39° 00′ 32.3″ | 6.51 | 3.17 | 152 | F7V | |
| T Cen | | | 252 | T | 119090 | 66825 | 13^{h} 41^{m} 45.58^{s} | −33° 35′ 50.6″ | 6.58 | −2.43 | 2063 | M3e | semiregular variable, V_{max} = 5.5^{m}, V_{min} = 9.0^{m}, P = 90.44 d |
| HD 114729 | | | 188 | | 114729 | 64459 | 13^{h} 12^{m} 44.26^{s} | −31° 52′ 24.1″ | 6.69 | 3.97 | 114 | G3V | has a planet (b) |
| HD 117253 | | | | | 117253 | 65891 | 13^{h} 30^{m} 25.0^{s} | −58° 39′ 52″ | 6.75 | | 444 | K0III | has a planet |
| HD 115470 | | | | | 115470 | 64892 | 13^{h} 18^{m} 05.0^{s} | −44° 03′ 19″ | 6.80 | | 408 | B9.5V | has a planet |
| HD 116434 | | | | | 116434 | 65426 | 13^{h} 24^{m} 36.0^{s} | −51° 30′ 16″ | 7.01 | | 356 | A2V | has a planet HIP 65426 b |
| HD 117618 | | | | | 117618 | 66047 | 13^{h} 32^{m} 25.0^{s} | −47° 16′ 16″ | 7.18 | 4.28 | 124 | G2V | Dofida, has two planets (b and c) |
| HD 117207 | | | | | 117207 | 65808 | 13^{h} 29^{m} 21.11^{s} | −35° 34′ 15.6″ | 7.26 | 4.67 | 108 | G8IV-V | has a planet (b) |
| HD 102117 | | | | | 102117 | 57291 | 11^{h} 44^{m} 50.46^{s} | −58° 42′ 13.4″ | 7.47 | 4.35 | 137 | G6V | Uklun, has a planet (b) |
| HD 121504 | | | | | 121504 | 68162 | 13^{h} 57^{m} 17.24^{s} | −56° 02′ 24.5″ | 7.54 | 4.29 | 145 | G2V | has a planet (b) |
| Przybylski's Star | | | | V816 | 101065 | 56709 | 11^{h} 37^{m} 37.0406^{s} | −46° 42′ 34.882″ | 8.02 | | 357.8 | F0, F5 or G0V | V816 Cen; chemically peculiar star; δ Sct variable, V_{max} = 7.996^{m}, V_{min} = 8.020^{m}, P = 0.0084306 d |
| HD 109749 | | | | | 109749 | 61595 | 12^{h} 37^{m} 16.38^{s} | −40° 48′ 43.6″ | 8.10 | 4.24 | 192 | G3V | has a planet (b) |
| HD 101930 | | | | | 101930 | 57172 | 11^{h} 43^{m} 30.11^{s} | −58° 00′ 24.8″ | 8.21 | 5.79 | 99 | K1V | has a planet (b) |
| HD 114386 | | | | | 114386 | 64295 | 13^{h} 10^{m} 39.82^{s} | −35° 03′ 17.2″ | 8.73 | 6.49 | 91 | K3V | has two planets (b & c) |
| HD 113538 | | | | | 113538 | 63833 | 13^{h} 04^{m} 57^{s} | −52° 26′ 35″ | 9.02 | | 52 | K9V | has two planets (b and c) |
| HD 125595 | | | | | 125595 | 70170 | 14^{h} 21^{m} 23^{s} | −40° 23′ 39″ | 9.03 | | 89 | K4V | has a planet (b) |
| HD 108236 | | | | | 108236 | 60689 | 12^{h} 26^{m} 17.8^{s} | −51° 21′ 47″ | 9.2 | | 211 | K4V | has four planets |
| HD 103197 | | | | | 103197 | 57931 | 11^{h} 52^{m} 52.98^{s} | −50° 17′ 34.2″ | 9.41 | 5.94 | 161 | K1Vp... | has a planet (b) |
| HD 120411 | | | | | 120411 | 67522 | 13^{h} 50^{m} 06.0^{s} | −40° 50′ 09″ | 9.9 | | 415 | | has a planet |
| HD 124448 | | | | | 124448 | 69619 | 14^{h} 14^{m} 58.6^{s} | −46° 17′ 19.3″ | 9.99 | | 1531 | B3p | Popper's Star; EHe star |
| PSR B1259-63 | | | | | | | 13^{h} 02^{m} 47.66^{s} | −63° 50′ 08.07″ | 10.08 | | | B2e | Pulsar in binary system |
| WASP-131 | | | | | | | 14^{h} 00^{m} 46.0^{s} | −30° 35′ 01″ | 10.1 | | 815 | G0 | has a transiting planet |
| WASP-167 | | | | | | | 13^{h} 04^{m} 10.5^{s} | −35° 32′ 58″ | 10.5 | | 1243 | F1 V | has a transiting planet |
| WASP-87 A | | | | | | | 12^{h} 21^{m} 18.0^{s} | −52° 50′ 27″ | 10.7 | | 783 | F5 | has a transiting planet |
| WASP-15 | | | | | | | 13^{h} 55^{m} 43.0^{s} | −32° 09′ 35″ | 10.9 | | 1005 | F7 | Nyamien, has a transiting planet (b) |
| WASP-172 | | | | | | | 13^{h} 17^{m} 44.0^{s} | −47° 14′ 15″ | 11.0 | | | F1V | has a transiting planet |
| Proxima Centauri | | | | V645 | | 70890 | 14^{h} 29^{m} 42.95^{s} | −62° 40′ 46.1″ | 11.05 | 15.49 | 4.22 | M5.5V | α Cen C, V645 Cen; nearest star; flare star; a component of the triple Alpha Centauri star system |
| WASP-130 | | | | | | | 13^{h} 32^{m} 25.0^{s} | −42° 28′ 31″ | 11.1 | | 587 | G6 | has a transiting planet |
| WASP-108 | | | | | | | 13^{h} 03^{m} 19.0^{s} | −49° 38′ 23″ | 11.2 | | 718 | F9 | has a transiting planet |
| WASP-41 | | | | | | | 12^{h} 42^{m} 28.5^{s} | −30° 38′ 24″ | 11.6 | | 587 | G8V | has two transiting planets |
| 1A 1118-61 | | | | | | | 11^{h} 20^{m} 57.18^{s} | −61° 55′ 00.2″ | 12.12 | | | O9.5III/Ve | high-mass X-ray binary |
| WASP-129 | | | | | | | 11^{h} 45^{m} 12.0^{s} | −42° 03′ 50″ | 12.3 | | 802 | G1 | has a transiting planet |
| WASP-128 | | | | | | | 11^{h} 31^{m} 26.1^{s} | −41° 41′ 22″ | 12.5 | | 1376 | G0V | has a transiting planet |
| GJ 3737 | | | | | | | 12^{h} 38^{m} 49.141^{s} | −38° 22′ 52.80″ | 12.74 | | 20.8 | M4.5V | a red dwarf |
| WASP-184 | | | | | | | 13^{h} 58^{m} 04.0^{s} | −30° 20′ 53″ | 12.9 | | 2087 | G0 | has a transiting planet |
| WASP-171 | | | | | | | 11^{h} 27^{m} 23.0^{s} | −44° 05′ 19″ | 13 | | 2524 | | has a transiting planet |
| Krzeminski's Star | | | | V779 | | | 11^{h} 21^{m} 15.78^{s} | −60° 37′ 22.7″ | 13.25 | | 26000 | O6.5II | V779 Cen; optical component of X-ray binary star Centaurus X-3; eclipsing binary, V_{max} = 13.25^{m}, V_{min} = 13.46^{m}, P = 2.08726 d |
| BPM 37093 | | | | V886 | | | 12^{h} 38^{m} 49.93^{s} | −49° 48′ 01.2″ | 13.96 | 13.02 | 50 | DA | V886 Cen; nicknamed Lucy; white dwarf; ZZ Cet variable, ΔV = 0.02^{m} |
| 2M1207 | | | | | | | 12^{h} 07^{m} 33.47^{s} | −39° 32′ 54.0″ | 20.15 | | 192 | M8V | 2MASSW J1207334-393254; brown dwarf; has a planet 2M1207b |
Table legend: • Name = Proper name • B = Bayer designation • F or/and G. = Flamsteed designation or Gould designation • Var = Variable-star designation • HD = Henry Draper Catalogue designation number • HIP = Hipparcos Catalogue designation number • RA = Right ascension for the Epoch/Equinox J2000.0 • Dec = Declination for the Epoch/Equinox J2000.0 • vis. mag. = visual magnitude (m or m_{v}), also known as apparent magnitude • abs. mag. = absolute magnitude (M_{v}) • Dist. (ly) = Distance in light-years from Earth • Sp. class = Spectral class of the star in the stellar classification system • Notes = Common name(s) or alternate name(s); comments; notable properties [for example: multiple star status, range of variability if it is a variable star, exoplanets, etc.]

== See also ==
- List of stars by constellation
