= Xi Centauri =

Bayer designation

The Bayer designation Xi Centauri (ξ Cen / ξ Centauri) is shared by two star systems, in the constellation Centaurus:

- ξ¹ Centauri
- ξ² Centauri

They are separated by 0.66° on the sky.
