= Z Centauri =

The Bayer designations z Centauri and Z Centauri are distinct. Due to technical limitations, both designations link here. For the star

- Z Centauri, see SN 1895B
- z Centauri, see HD 119921

== See also ==
- ζ Centauri
