= W Centauri =

The designations W Centauri and w Centauri refer to two different stars in the constellation Centaurus.

- W Centauri, the variable star designation for the faint Mira variable HD 103513
- HD 110458, a red giant also known by its Latin-letter Bayer designation w Centauri

== See also ==
- ω Centauri
