= F Centauri =

Suspected astrometric binary star system in the constellation Centaurus

Observation data Epoch J2000.0 Equinox ICRS
- Constellation: Centaurus
- Right ascension: 12^{h} 18^{m} 59.76635^{s}
- Declination: −55° 08′ 34.7346″
- Apparent magnitude (V): +5.01

Characteristics
- Spectral type: M1III
- B−V color index: 1.600±0.008
- Variable type: suspected

Astrometry
Radial velocity (R_{v})	−7.1±2.8 km/s
Proper motion (μ)	RA: -79.258 mas/yr Dec.: -15.215 mas/yr
Parallax (π)	7.3256±0.1919 mas
Distance	450 ± 10 ly (137 ± 4 pc)
Absolute magnitude (M_{V})	−0.87

Details
Radius	47.9+3.9 −6.3 R_{☉}
Luminosity	502±15 L_{☉}
Temperature	3,948+287 −151 K

Other designations
- F Cen, NSV 5544, CPD−54°5113, FK5 2985, GC 16792, HD 107079, HIP 60059, HR 4682, SAO 239838, CCDM J12190-5509

Database references
SIMBAD	data

F Centauri is a suspected astrometric binary star system in the southern constellation of Centaurus. It has a reddish hue and is visible to the naked eye with an apparent visual magnitude that fluctuates around +5.01. The system is located at a distance of approximately 450 light years from the Sun based on parallax, and it has an absolute magnitude of −0.87. O. J. Eggen flagged this star as a member of the Hyades Supercluster.

The visible component is an aging red giant star on the asymptotic giant branch with a stellar classification of M1III, indicating it has exhausted the supply of both hydrogen and helium at its core and is cooling and expanding. It is a suspected variable star of unknown type that has been measured ranging in brightness from visual magnitude 4.94 down to 5.07. At present it has 48 times the radius of the Sun. It is radiating 502 times the Sun's luminosity from its enlarged photosphere at an effective temperature of 3,948 K.
