= HD 123569 =

Star in the constellation Centaurus

- Location of HD 123569 (circled in red)

Observation data Epoch J2000.0 Equinox ICRS
- Constellation: Centaurus
- Right ascension: 14^{h} 09^{m} 54.81424^{s}
- Declination: −53° 26′ 20.2049″
- Apparent magnitude (V): 4.74

Characteristics
- Evolutionary stage: red giant branch
- Spectral type: G9-III
- B−V color index: +0.938±0.004

Astrometry
Radial velocity (R_{v})	−17.12±0.12 km/s
Proper motion (μ)	RA: −145.136 mas/yr Dec.: −91.064 mas/yr
Parallax (π)	18.2253±0.1091 mas
Distance	179 ± 1 ly (54.9 ± 0.3 pc)
Absolute magnitude (M_{V})	+1.00

Details
Mass	2.50+0.11 −0.06 M_{☉}
Radius	8.58+0.08 −0.17 R_{☉}
Luminosity	40.1±0.5 L_{☉}
Surface gravity (log g)	3.13±0.08 cgs
Temperature	5,089±31 K
Metallicity [Fe/H]	+0.07±0.03 dex
Age	621 Myr

Other designations
- CPD−52°7028, HD 123569, HIP 69191, HR 5297, SAO 241496, WDS J14099-5326A

Database references
SIMBAD	data

HD 123569 is a single star in the southern constellation of Centaurus, positioned near the eastern constellation border with Lupus. This object has a yellowish hue and is visible to the naked eye with an apparent visual magnitude of 4.74. It is located at a distance of approximately 179 light years from the Sun based on parallax, and it has an absolute magnitude of +1.00. The star is drifting closer with a radial velocity of −17 km/s. O. J. Eggen flagged this star as a member of the Hyades Supercluster.

This is an aging giant star with a stellar classification of G9-III, having exhausted the supply of hydrogen at its core then evolved off the main sequence by cooling and expanding. At present it has around 8.6 times the girth of the Sun, with a slightly higher than solar metallicity – what astronomers term the abundance of elements with a higher atomic number than helium. The star is radiating 41 times the luminosity of the Sun from its enlarged photosphere at an effective temperature of 5,089 K.
