= HD 125288 =

Star in the constellation Centaurus

- Location of v Centauri (circled in red)

Observation data Epoch J2000.0 Equinox ICRS
- Constellation: Centaurus
- Right ascension: 14^{h} 20^{m} 19.54267^{s}
- Declination: −56° 23′ 11.3838″
- Apparent magnitude (V): 4.30

Characteristics
- Evolutionary stage: Supergiant
- Spectral type: B5Ib/II or B6Ib
- B−V color index: 0.082±0.003

Astrometry
| Radial velocity (R_{v}) | 4.2±2.7 km/s |
| Proper motion (μ) | RA: −9.437 mas/yr Dec.: −7.543 mas/yr |
| Parallax (π) | 2.2511±0.1972 mas |
| Distance | 1,270±130 ly (390±40 pc) |
| Absolute magnitude (M_{V}) | −3.56 |

Details
| Mass | 9.3±0.3 M_{☉} |
| Radius | 21±2 R_{☉} |
| Luminosity | 12,600+3,200 −2,600 L_{☉} |
| Surface gravity (log g) | 2.77±0.05 cgs |
| Temperature | 13,700±300 K |
| Rotational velocity (v sin i) | 23±4 km/s |
| Age | 28.84+3.52 −3.14 Myr |

Other designations
- v Cen, CPD−55°5984, FK5 529, GC 19318, HD 125288, HIP 70069, HR 5358, SAO 241641

Database references
| SIMBAD | data |

HD 125288 is a single star in the southern constellation of Centaurus. It has the Bayer designation v Centauri (lower case V); while HD 125288 is the star's identifier in the Henry Draper catalogue. The object has a blue-white hue and is faintly visible to the naked eye with an apparent visual magnitude of 4.30. Based on spectroscopic measurements, it is located at a distance of approximately 1,270 light years from Earth. This is a candidate runaway star that is moving to the west and falling back into the Galactic plane. It has an absolute magnitude of −3.56.

This massive B-type supergiant star has a stellar classification of B5Ib/II or B6Ib. It is around 29 million years old and has 9 times the mass of the Sun. The star has expanded to 21 times the girth of the Sun and is spinning with a projected rotational velocity of 23 km/s. It is radiating 12,600 times the luminosity of the Sun from its photosphere at an effective temperature of 13,700 K.

In 2016, an asterism including HD 125288 (SAO 241641) was unofficially identified in honor of David Bowie.
