= HD 98176 =

Star in the constellation Centaurus

Observation data Epoch J2000.0 Equinox ICRS
- Constellation: Centaurus
- Right ascension: 11^{h} 17^{m} 14.32361^{s}
- Declination: −41° 56′ 03.5646″
- Apparent magnitude (V): 6.44±0.01

Characteristics
- Evolutionary stage: main sequence
- Spectral type: A0 V
- U−B color index: −0.04
- B−V color index: +0.03

Astrometry
Proper motion (μ)	RA: −55.255 mas/yr Dec.: −7.836 mas/yr
Parallax (π)	9.3823±0.0298 mas
Distance	348 ± 1 ly (106.6 ± 0.3 pc)
Absolute magnitude (M_{V})	+1.35

Details
Mass	2.5±0.3 M_{☉}
Radius	2.04 R_{☉}
Luminosity	28.3 L_{☉}
Surface gravity (log g)	4.1 cgs
Temperature	9,774^{+157}_{−220} K
Metallicity [Fe/H]	−0.09 dex

Other designations
- 22 G. Centauri, CD−41°6450, CPD−41°5248, GC 15525, HD 98176, HIP 55133, SAO 222695

Database references
SIMBAD	data

HD 98176, also designated as HIP 55133 and rarely 22 G. Centauri, is a solitary, white hued star located in the southern constellation Centaurus. It has an apparent magnitude of 6.44, placing it near the limit for naked eye visibility. Based on parallax measurements from Gaia DR3, the object is estimated to be 348 light years distant. At its current distance, its brightness is diminished by 0.32 magnitudes due to interstellar dust. Pauzen et al. (2001) lists it as a potential λ Boötis star.

This is an ordinary A-type main-sequence star with a stellar classification of A0 V. Pauzen et al. (2001) gives it a slightly cooler class of A1 Vn, which includes broad absorption lines due to rapid rotation. It has 2.5 times the mass of the Sun and double its radius. It radiates 28.3 times the luminosity of the Sun from its photosphere at an effective temperature of 9,774 K. Based on parameters derived from extinction in the Gaia passband, HD 98176 has an iron abundance 19% below solar levels.
