= HD 108541 =

Star in the constellation Centaurus

HD 108541 (u Centauri)
Observation data Epoch J2000 Equinox ICRS
- Constellation: Centaurus
- Right ascension: 12^{h} 28^{m} 22.46490^{s}
- Declination: −39° 02′ 28.2168″
- Apparent magnitude (V): 5.448

Characteristics
- Evolutionary stage: main sequence
- Spectral type: B8/9V
- B−V color index: −0.08

Astrometry
Radial velocity (R_{v})	5.00 km/s
Proper motion (μ)	RA: −28.01 mas/yr Dec.: −13.76 mas/yr
Parallax (π)	7.47±0.28 mas
Distance	440 ± 20 ly (134 ± 5 pc)
Absolute magnitude (M_{V})	−-0.18

Details
Mass	3.1 M_{☉}
Radius	3.6 R_{☉}
Luminosity	150 L_{☉}
Surface gravity (log g)	3.77 cgs
Temperature	10,691 K
Rotational velocity (v sin i)	191 km/s
Age	253 Myr

Other designations
- u Cen, CD−34°7753, HD 108541, HIP 60855, SAO 203508, HR 4748, GC 17001

Database references
SIMBAD	data

HD 108541, also known by its Bayer designation u Centauri is a star located in the constellation Centaurus, It is also known as HR 4748. The apparent magnitude of the star is about 5.4, meaning it is only visible to the naked eye under excellent viewing conditions. Its distance is about 440 light-years (140 parsecs), based on its parallax measured by the Hipparcos astrometry satellite.

The spectral type of HD 108541 is B8/9V, meaning it is a late B-type main sequence star. These types of stars are a few times more massive than the Sun, and have effective temperatures of about 10,000 to 30,000 K. HD 108541 is just over 3 times more massive than the Sun and has a temperature of about 11,000 K.
