= HD 111915 =

Star in the constellation Centaurus

e Centauri
- Location of e Centauri (circled in red)

Observation data Epoch J2000.0 Equinox ICRS
- Constellation: Centaurus
- Right ascension: 12^{h} 53^{m} 06.91^{s}
- Declination: −48° 56′ 35.9″
- Apparent magnitude (V): +4.33

Characteristics
- Evolutionary stage: red giant branch
- Spectral type: K3-4III
- U−B color index: +1.58
- B−V color index: +1.344±0.068

Astrometry
Radial velocity (R_{v})	−2.4±1.6 km/s
Proper motion (μ)	RA: −79.19±0.15 mas/yr Dec.: −24.26±0.13 mas/yr
Parallax (π)	11.08±0.19 mas
Distance	294 ± 5 ly (90 ± 2 pc)
Absolute magnitude (M_{V})	−0.45

Details
Mass	4.0 M_{☉}
Radius	30 R_{☉}
Luminosity	343 L_{☉}
Surface gravity (log g)	1.99 cgs
Temperature	4,526 K

Other designations
- e Cen, CD−48°7753, FK5 3024, GC 17473, HD 111915, HIP 62867, HR 4888, SAO 223731

Database references
SIMBAD	data

HD 111915 is a single star in the southern constellation of Centaurus. It has the Bayer designation e Centauri, while HD 111915 is the star's identifier in the Henry Draper Catalogue. This is an aging giant star with a stellar classification of K3-4III. It is faintly visible to the naked eye with an apparent visual magnitude of +4.33. The distance to this star is approximately 294 light years based on parallax.
