= Q Centauri =

Star in the constellation Centaurus

Observation data Epoch J2000.0 Equinox ICRS
- Constellation: Centaurus
- A
- Right ascension: 13^{h} 41^{m} 44.770^{s}
- Declination: −54° 33′ 33.93″
- Apparent magnitude (V): +5.22
- B
- Right ascension: 13^{h} 41^{m} 44.956^{s}
- Declination: −54° 33′ 39.21″
- Apparent magnitude (V): +6.52

Characteristics
- Spectral type: B8Vn + A0V
- U−B color index: −0.23
- B−V color index: −0.05

Astrometry

A
Radial velocity (R_{v})	+14.49±0.74 km/s
Proper motion (μ)	RA: −43.783 mas/yr Dec.: −24.935 mas/yr
Parallax (π)	11.2810±0.0956 mas
Distance	289 ± 2 ly (88.6 ± 0.8 pc)

B
Proper motion (μ)	RA: −43.783 mas/yr Dec.: −24.935 mas/yr
Parallax (π)	11.3203±0.0329 mas
Distance	288.1 ± 0.8 ly (88.3 ± 0.3 pc)

Details

A
Mass	2.8 M_{☉}
Radius	2.4 R_{☉}
Luminosity	70 L_{☉}
Surface gravity (log g)	4.12 cgs
Temperature	10,740 K

B
Mass	2.3 M_{☉}
Radius	1.6 R_{☉}
Luminosity	16 L_{☉}
Surface gravity (log g)	4.37 cgs
Temperature	9,016 K

Other designations
- HR 5141, HD 118991, CP−53°5725, HIP 66821, SAO 241076, GC 18495, CCDM J13417-5434

Database references
SIMBAD	data
- A
- B

Q Centauri (Q Cen) is a binary star in the constellation Centaurus. It has a combined apparent magnitude of +4.99 and is approximately 288 light years from Earth.

The primary component, Q Centauri A, is a blue-white B-type main sequence dwarf with an apparent magnitude of +5.2. Its companion, Q Centauri B, is a white A-type main sequence dwarf with an apparent magnitude of +6.5. The two stars are separated by 5.6 arcseconds on the sky.
