= HD 108063 =

Star in the constellation Centaurus

Observation data Epoch J2000.0 Equinox ICRS
- Constellation: Centaurus
- Right ascension: 12^{h} 25^{m} 08.518^{s}
- Declination: −42° 30′ 51.53″
- Apparent magnitude (V): 6.09

Characteristics
- Evolutionary stage: subgiant
- Spectral type: G5III + F/G
- B−V color index: +0.652±0.002

Astrometry
Radial velocity (R_{v})	34.48 ± 0.16 km/s
Proper motion (μ)	RA: −135.319 mas/yr Dec.: −22.538 mas/yr
Parallax (π)	19.0734±0.0231 mas
Distance	171.0 ± 0.2 ly (52.43 ± 0.06 pc)
Absolute magnitude (M_{V})	+2.44

Details
Mass	1.622±0.001 M_{☉}
Radius	2.51±0.05 R_{☉}
Luminosity	8.42±0.27 L_{☉}
Surface gravity (log g)	3.69±0.08 cgs
Temperature	6,150±123 K
Metallicity [Fe/H]	0.55±0.04 dex
Rotational velocity (v sin i)	5.4±1.0 km/s
Age	1.85±0.07 Myr

Other designations
- CD−41 7163, HD 108063, HIP 60591, HR 4721, SAO 223426

Database references
SIMBAD	data

HD 108063 is a star that lies 171 light-years away in the constellation of Centaurus. The star is not particularly noteworthy except for its high heavy element content.

== Properties ==
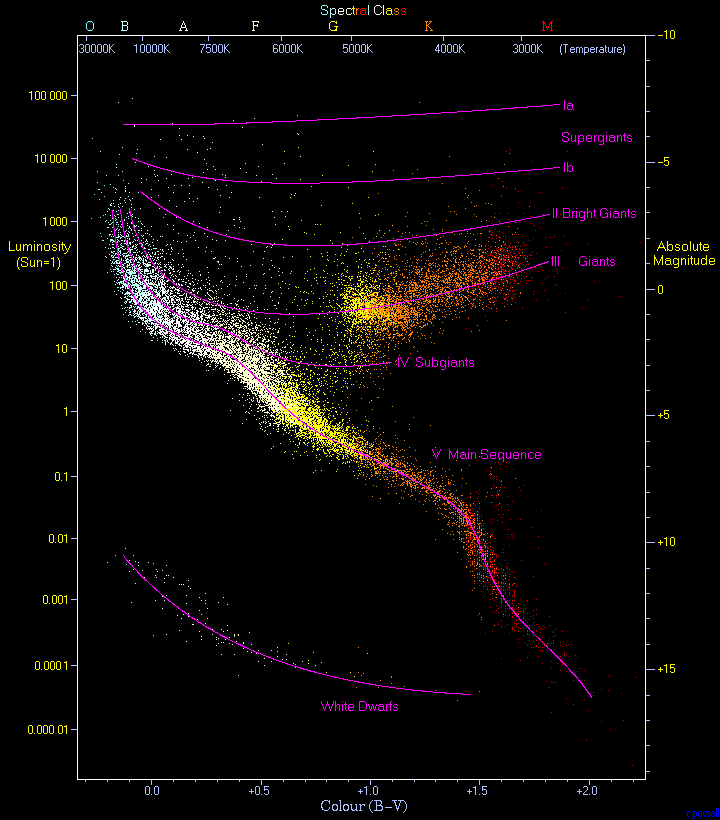

HD 108063 is a somewhat bright star that lies in an area of the southern sky towards the middle of Centaurus. It has not been studied particularly extensively, but was identified as modestly high proper motion star during the previous century. With a Gaia Data Release 3 parallax of 19.0 mas, it lies at a distance of 52.4 parsecs, so the star is relatively nearby. It has been classified as a G5III or G4IV star, and evolutionary models place it on the subgiant branch.

HD 108063 has a high metallicity, with [Fe/H] being about 0.55 dex, which corresponds to a metallicity of 3.54 times the solar value. This is one of the highest metallicities for any known star, and is identical to 1σ to the Fe/H of HD 126614 (0.56±0.04 dex) and HD 177830 (0.55±0.03 dex).
