= HD 121474 =

Single star in the constellation Centaurus

- Location of HD 121474 (circled in red)

Observation data Epoch J2000.0 Equinox J2000.0
- Constellation: Centaurus
- Right ascension: 13^{h} 57^{m} 38.88358^{s}
- Declination: −63° 41′ 12.1139″
- Apparent magnitude (V): 4.701

Characteristics
- Evolutionary stage: red giant branch
- Spectral type: K1.5IIIb:
- B−V color index: +1.101

Astrometry
Radial velocity (R_{v})	+21.86±0.12 km/s
Proper motion (μ)	RA: −40.640 mas/yr Dec.: −33.433 mas/yr
Parallax (π)	15.2855±0.0804 mas
Distance	213 ± 1 ly (65.4 ± 0.3 pc)
Absolute magnitude (M_{V})	+0.67

Details
Mass	2.70±0.04 M_{☉}
Radius	11.9±0.2 R_{☉}
Luminosity	65.2±0.6 L_{☉}
Surface gravity (log g)	2.75 cgs
Temperature	4,753±4 K
Metallicity [Fe/H]	−0.01 dex
Age	502 Myr

Other designations
- CPD−63°3070, FK5 514, HD 121474, HIP 68191, HR 5241, SAO 252531

Database references
SIMBAD	data

HD 121474 is a single star in the southern constellation of Centaurus, near the southern constellation border with Circinus. It is an orange-hued star and is faintly visible to the naked eye with an apparent visual magnitude of 4.70. This object is located at a distance of approximately 213 light years based on parallax, and it has an absolute magnitude of 0.67. It is drifting further away from the Sun with a radial velocity of +22 km/s.

This is an aging giant star with a stellar classification of K1.5IIIb:, having exhausted the supply of hydrogen at its core then cooled and expanded off the main sequence. At present it has 12 times the girth of the Sun, with a near-solar metallicity of −0.01. The star is radiating 65 times the luminosity of the Sun from its enlarged photosphere at an effective temperature of 4,753 K.
