= HD 115310 =

Star in the constellation Centaurus

r Centauri
Observation data Epoch J2000.0 Equinox ICRS
- Constellation: Centaurus
- Right ascension: 13^{h} 16^{m} 53.13228^{s}
- Declination: −31° 30′ 22.3332″
- Apparent magnitude (V): +5.12

Characteristics
- Evolutionary stage: red clump
- Spectral type: K1III
- B−V color index: 0.94

Astrometry
Radial velocity (R_{v})	+12.9 km/s
Proper motion (μ)	RA: +34.179 mas/yr Dec.: −47.615 mas/yr
Parallax (π)	12.7119±0.1426 mas
Distance	257 ± 3 ly (78.7 ± 0.9 pc)
Absolute magnitude (M_{V})	+0.61

Details
Mass	2.71±0.19 M_{☉}
Radius	10.8±0.8 R_{☉}
Luminosity	67.11±6.91 L_{☉}
Surface gravity (log g)	2.63 cgs
Temperature	5,060 K
Metallicity [Fe/H]	−0.15 dex

Other designations
- r Cen, CD−30°10457, FK5 1342, GC 17968, HD 115310, HIP 64803, HR 5006, SAO 204312

Database references
SIMBAD	data

HD 115310, also known by its Bayer designation r Centauri, is a star in the southern constellation Centaurus. It is an orange-hued star that is visible to the naked eye with an apparent visual magnitude that ranges around +5.12. Based upon parallax measurements, it is located approximately 257 light years away. It is drifting further from the Sun with a radial velocity of +12.9 km/s.

This object is an aging K-type giant star with a stellar classification of K1III. It is classified as a red clump giant, suggesting it is on the horizontal branch undergoing core helium fusion. The star has 2.7 times the mass of the Sun and has expanded to 11 times the Sun's radius. It is radiating 67 times the luminosity of the Sun from its swollen photosphere at an effective temperature of 5,060 K.
