= HD 97413 =

Binary star in the constellation Centaurus

- Location of HD 97413 (circled)

Observation data Epoch J2000 Equinox ICRS
- Constellation: Centaurus
- Right ascension: 11^{h} 12^{m} 10.18976^{s}
- Declination: −46° 16′ 00.3202″
- Apparent magnitude (V): 6.27±0.01

Characteristics
- Spectral type: A1 V
- U−B color index: +0.04
- B−V color index: +0.15

Astrometry
Proper motion (μ)	RA: −46.711 mas/yr Dec.: +9.593 mas/yr
Parallax (π)	10.1866±0.155 mas
Distance	320 ± 5 ly (98 ± 1 pc)
Absolute magnitude (M_{V})	+1.5

Details

A
Mass	1.94±0.11 M_{☉}
Radius	2.18+0.05 −0.08 R_{☉}
Luminosity	19.6 L_{☉}
Surface gravity (log g)	4.07±0.05 cgs
Temperature	7,800 K
Metallicity [Fe/H]	−0.29 dex

Other designations
- CD−45°6771, CPD−45°5279, GC 15400, HD 97413, HIP 54718, SAO 222635, WDS J11122-4616AB

Database references
SIMBAD	data

HD 97413 is a binary star located in the southern constellation Centaurus. The system has a combined magnitude of 6.27, placing it near the limit for naked eye visibility. Based on parallax measurements from the Gaia spacecraft, the system is located 320 light years away from the Solar System.

The objects binarity was detected in a Hipparcos survey. The two components can't be distinguished because both stars have an angular separation of 0.01″. Nevertheless, speckle interferometry revealed the components to have a 2.6 magnitude difference. They are located along a position angle of 250°.

The visible component – HD 97413 A – has a stellar classification of A1 V, indicating that it is an ordinary A-type main-sequence star. It has 1.94 times the mass of the Sun and a radius of 2.18 R_{☉}. It radiates 19.6 times the luminosity of the Sun from its photosphere at an effective temperature of 7,800 K, giving it a white hue. However, this is not typical for an A1 star. Parameters determined by Gaia's extinction reveal HD 97413 A to have an iron abundance half of the Sun's, making it metal deficient.
