= V831 Centauri =

Star in the constellation Centaurus

- Location of V831 Centauri (circled in red)

Observation data Epoch J2000 Equinox ICRS
- Constellation: Centaurus
- Right ascension: 13^{h} 12^{m} 17.59459^{s}
- Declination: −59° 55′ 14.0842″
- Apparent magnitude (V): 4.49 to 4.66

Characteristics
- Spectral type: B7V (B8V + ? + B9V)
- B−V color index: −0.073±0.007
- Variable type: Rotating ellipsoidal

Astrometry
Radial velocity (R_{v})	+12.0±3.7 km/s
Proper motion (μ)	RA: −29.71 mas/yr Dec.: −17.40 mas/yr
Parallax (π)	8.61±0.85 mas
Distance	380 ± 40 ly (120 ± 10 pc)
Absolute magnitude (M_{V})	−0.72

Orbit
Primary	Aa
Name	Ab
Period (P)	0.642 5251 days
Semi-major axis (a)	6.09±0.02 R_{☉}
Eccentricity (e)	0
Inclination (i)	61.3±0.45°

Orbit
Primary	A
Name	B
Period (P)	27.51±0.42 yr
Semi-major axis (a)	0.16644±0.00093″
Eccentricity (e)	0.6657±0.0084
Inclination (i)	60.22±0.96°
Longitude of the node (Ω)	279.8±1.0°
Periastron epoch (T)	2022.140±0.071
Argument of periastron (ω) (secondary)	18.3±2.8°

Orbit
Primary	AB
Name	C
Period (P)	~2,000 yr
Semi-major axis (a)	3.2±0.1″
Eccentricity (e)	0.5
Inclination (i)	68°
Longitude of the node (Ω)	−85°
Periastron epoch (T)	1084.5±3.0

Details

Aa
Mass	4.08±0.07 M_{☉}
Radius	2.38±0.03 R_{☉}
Luminosity	261.12 L_{☉}
Temperature	13,000±300 K
Rotational velocity (v sin i)	194 km/s

Ab
Mass	3.35±0.06 M_{☉}
Radius	2.25±0.03 R_{☉}
Temperature	11,800±300 K
Rotational velocity (v sin i)	170 km/s
Age	18±3 Myr

B
Mass	2.5 M_{☉}

C
Mass	1.5 M_{☉}

Other designations
- V831 Cen, CD−59°4614, GC 17866, HD 114529, HIP 64425, HR 4975, SAO 240645, WDS J13123-5955

Database references
SIMBAD	data

V831 Centauri is a multiple star system in the constellation Centaurus. It is visible to the naked eye with an apparent visual magnitude that ranges from 4.49 down to 4.66. The system is located at a distance of approximately 380 light years from the Sun based on parallax, and is drifting further away with a radial velocity of +12 km/s. It is a likely member of the Lower Centaurus Crux concentration of the Sco OB2 association of co-moving stars.

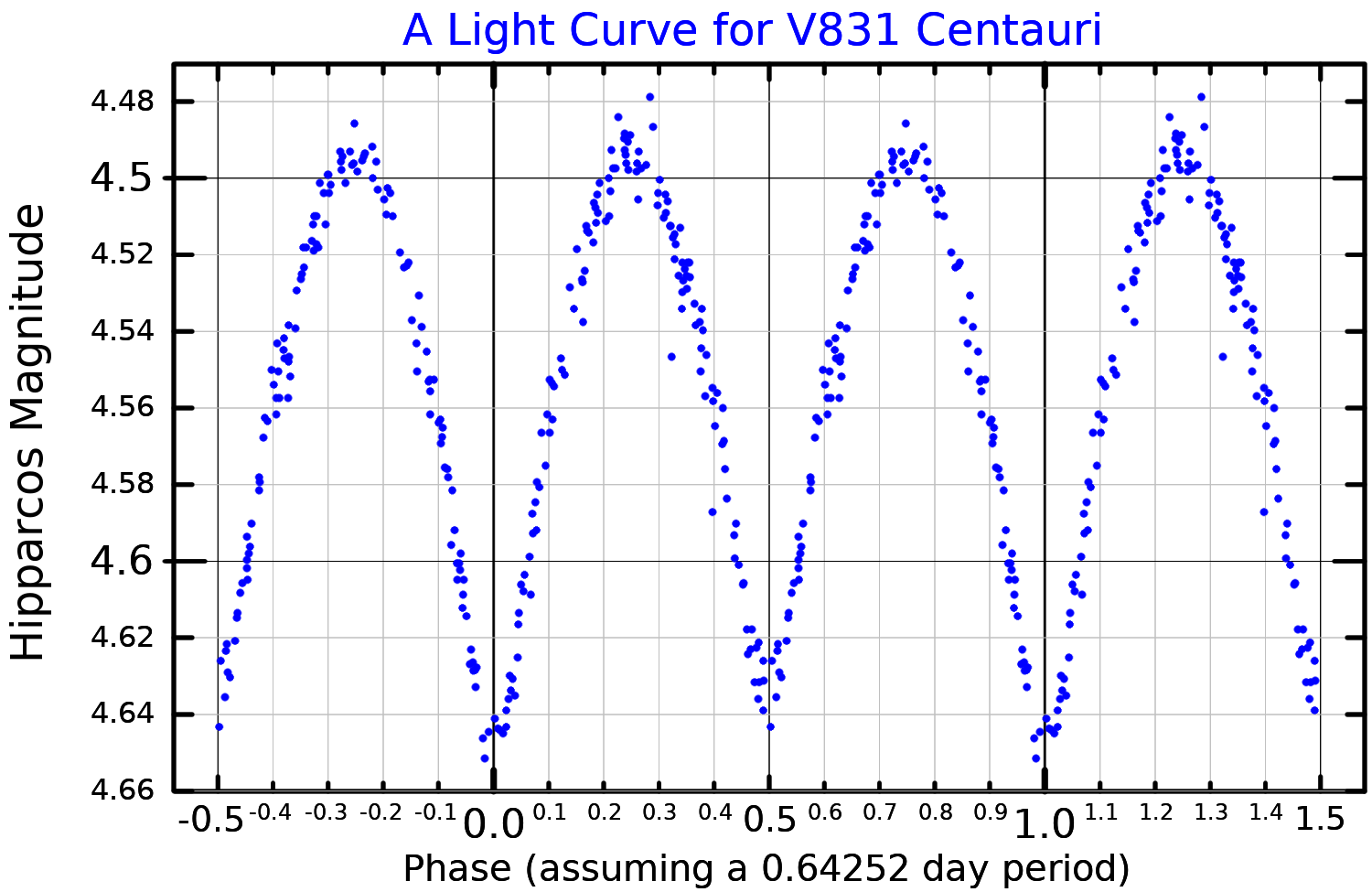
A light curve for V831 Centauri, plotted from Hipparcos data

The magnitude 5.3 primary component forms a near-contact binary system, with the components designated Aa and Ab. It has a combined class of B8V, an orbital period of 0.6425251 d, a separation of 6 R_{☉}, and both components are close to co-rotating with their orbit. The larger member has 4.1 times the mass of the Sun and 2.4 times the Sun's radius, while the companion has 3.4 and 2.3 times, respectively. In 1960, Alan William James Cousins announced the discovery that the star, then known as HR 4975, is a variable star. It was given its variable star designation, V831 Centauri, in 1985. The pair form an eclipsing system, and it is classed as a rotating ellipsoidal variable.

The third star, component B, is magnitude 6.0 and forms a visual pair, designated See 170, with the inner system. They orbit each other with a period of 27.5 years and an eccentricity of 0.666. This star has a mass about 2.5 times that of the Sun and may be an Ap star. The fourth member, component C, orbits the system with a period of around 2,000 years. There is a fifth member, component D.
