= HD 101570 =

Yellow supergiant star in the constellation Centaurus

Observation data Epoch J2000 Equinox ICRS
- Constellation: Centaurus
- Right ascension: 11^{h} 40^{m} 53.63379^{s}
- Declination: −62° 05′ 24.3655″
- Apparent magnitude (V): 4.93

Characteristics
- Spectral type: G3Ib
- B−V color index: 1.111±0.054

Astrometry
Radial velocity (R_{v})	+18.04±0.18 km/s
Proper motion (μ)	RA: −15.493±0.082 mas/yr Dec.: +0.981±0.087 mas/yr
Parallax (π)	3.0181±0.0777 mas
Distance	1,080 ± 30 ly (331 ± 9 pc)
Absolute magnitude (M_{V})	−2.24

Details
Mass	17.0 M_{☉}
Radius	61.2 R_{☉}
Luminosity	2,168 L_{☉}
Surface gravity (log g)	1.86 cgs
Temperature	4,753 K
Rotational velocity (v sin i)	21.4±2.1 km/s

Other designations
- CD−61°3145, GC 16037, HD 101570, HIP 56986, HR 4499, SAO 251535

Database references
SIMBAD	data

HD 101570 is a single star in the southern constellation of Centaurus. It has a yellow hue and is faintly visible to the naked eye with an apparent visual magnitude of 4.93. The star is located at a distance of approximately 1,080 light years from the Sun based on parallax, and is drifting further away with a radial velocity of +18 km/s. It has an absolute magnitude of −2.24.

This is an ageing supergiant star with a stellar classification of G3Ib. Having exhausted the supply of hydrogen at its core, the star has expanded to 61 times the radius of the Sun. It has an abnormally high rate of rotation for its evolutionary state, showing a projected rotational velocity of 21.4 km/s. The star is radiating 1,641 times the luminosity of the Sun from its photosphere at an effective temperature of 4,753 K.
