= Xi2 Centauri =

Triple star system in the constellation Centaurus

ξ^{2} Centauri
- Location of ξ^{2} Centauri (circled)

Observation data Epoch J2000.0 Equinox J2000.0 (ICRS)
- Constellation: Centaurus
- Right ascension: 13^{h} 06^{m} 54.639^{s}
- Declination: −49° 54′ 22.49″
- Apparent magnitude (V): 4.30 + 9.38

Characteristics
- Spectral type: B1.5 V or B2 IV + F7 V
- U−B color index: −0.810
- B−V color index: −0.197

Astrometry
Radial velocity (R_{v})	+14.3±4.1 km/s
Proper motion (μ)	RA: −27.118 mas/yr Dec.: −12.808 mas/yr
Parallax (π)	6.7962±0.1797 mas
Distance	480 ± 10 ly (147 ± 4 pc)
Absolute magnitude (M_{V})	−1.51

Orbit
Period (P)	7.6497 d
Eccentricity (e)	0.35
Periastron epoch (T)	2418077.493 JD
Argument of periastron (ω) (secondary)	308.6°
Semi-amplitude (K_{1}) (primary)	38.8 km/s

Details

ξ^{2} Cen A
Mass	8.1±0.1 M_{☉}
Luminosity (bolometric)	1,702 L_{☉}
Surface gravity (log g)	4.11±0.03 cgs
Temperature	20,790±335 K
Rotational velocity (v sin i)	25 km/s
Age	11.5±3.7 Myr

ξ^{2} Cen B
Mass	1.25 M_{☉}
Luminosity	2.4 L_{☉}
Temperature	6,194 K

Other designations
- ξ^{2} Cen, CD−49°7644, FK5 489, HD 113791, HIP 64004, HR 4942, SAO 223909

Database references
SIMBAD	data

Xi^{2} Centauri is a triple star system in the southern constellation of Centaurus. Its name is a Bayer designation that is Latinized from ξ^{2} Centauri, and abbreviated Xi^{2} Cen or ξ^{2} Cen. This system is visible to the naked eye as a point of light with a combined apparent visual magnitude of 4.30, and forms a wide optical double with the slightly dimmer ξ^{1} Centauri. Based upon an annual parallax shift of 6.80 mas, Xi^{2} Centauri lies roughly 480 light years from the Sun. At that distance, the visual magnitude is diminished by an interstellar extinction factor of 0.32 due to intervening dust.

This system was discovered to be a single-lined spectroscopic binary in 1910 by American astronomer Joseph Haines Moore. The pair, component A, orbit each other with a period of 7.6497 days and an eccentricity of 0.35. The primary is a B-type star with a stellar classification of B1.5 V or B2 IV, depending on the source. This indicates it may be a main sequence star or a more evolved subgiant star. It has about 8.1 times the mass of the Sun and radiates 1,702 times the solar luminosity from its outer atmosphere at an effective temperature of 20,790 K. It is a hybrid pulsator and shows variations in both g and p modes.

A third star, component B, is a magnitude 9.38 F-type main sequence star with a classification of F7 V. It has 1.25 times the mass of the Sun and radiates 2.4 times the solar luminosity at an effective temperature of 6,194 K. It lies at an angular separation of 25.1 arc seconds from the inner pair. They share a common proper motion, indicating they may be gravitationally bound with an orbital period of around 41,000 years.

The system has a peculiar velocity of 16.2±4.2 km/s. It belongs to the Scorpius–Centaurus association and appears to be a member of the Gould's Belt.
