= HD 113703 =

Star in the constellation Centaurus

f Centauri
- Location of f Centauri (circled in red)

Observation data Epoch J2000.0 Equinox ICRS
- Constellation: Centaurus
- Right ascension: 13^{h} 06^{m} 16.70^{s}
- Declination: −48° 27′ 47.8″
- Apparent magnitude (V): +4.71

Characteristics
- Evolutionary stage: Main sequence
- Spectral type: B4V + K0Ve
- U−B color index: −0.562
- B−V color index: −0.148±0.006

Astrometry
Radial velocity (R_{v})	+6.0±4.2 km/s
Proper motion (μ)	RA: −29.558 mas/yr Dec.: −15.692 mas/yr
Parallax (π)	8.1592±0.1559 mas
Distance	400 ± 8 ly (123 ± 2 pc)
Absolute magnitude (M_{V})	−0.68

Details

f Cen Aa
Mass	4.39 M_{☉}
Surface gravity (log g)	3.99 cgs
Temperature	14,769 K
Rotational velocity (v sin i)	140±7 km/s
Age	92 Myr

f Cen C
Mass	0.9 M_{☉}
Luminosity	0.49 L_{☉}
Temperature	5,020 K
Age	50 Myr

Other designations
- f Cen, CD−47°8088, GC 17750, HD 113703, HIP 63945, HR 4940, SAO 223900, CCDM J13063-4828

Database references
SIMBAD	data

HD 113703, also known by the Bayer designation f Centauri, is a multiple star system in the southern constellation of Centaurus. The combined apparent visual magnitude of this system is +4.71, which is sufficient to make it faintly visible to the naked eye. The distance to this system is approximately 400 light years based on parallax measurements. It is a member of the Lower Centaurus Crux subgroup of the Scorpius–Centaurus association.

The primary of f Centauri is a blue-white hued B-type main-sequence star with a stellar classification of B4V. It is a young star with an age estimated at around 92 million years, and is spinning rapidly with a projected rotational velocity of 140 km/s. A close companion with a K magnitude of 9.16, designated component C, was detected in 2002 at an angular separation of 1.55″. In 2013, a spectroscopic companion to the primary was observed using long baseline interferometry, with the two being designated components Aa and Ab.

A faint, magnitude 10.8 companion, component B, was first reported by J. F. W. Herschel in 1836. As of 2015, it was located at a separation of 11.6″ along a position angle of 78°. This is a K-type star with a class of K0Ve, showing emission in the Calcium H and K lines. It is a known BY Draconis variable star with the designation V1155 Centauri. It shares a common space motion with the primary, indicating a probable physical relationship, and its Gaia Data Release 3 parallax of 7.965″±0.018″ suggests a distance of 409 light years. The star shows a strong overabundance in lithium, which demonstrates its young age. It is about 0.8 magnitudes above zero age main sequence and thus is still contracting as a post-T Tauri star. X-ray emission has been detected from this star.
