= HD 125628 =

Binary star system in the constellation Centaurus

- Location of HD 125628 (circled in red)

Observation data Epoch J2000 Equinox ICRS
- Constellation: Centaurus
- Right ascension: 14^{h} 22^{m} 37.07301^{s}
- Declination: −58° 27′ 32.8193″
- Apparent magnitude (V): 4.76 (5.09 + 6.94)

Characteristics

A
- Evolutionary stage: giant
- Spectral type: G9III
- B−V color index: +0.795±0.003

B
- Evolutionary stage: main sequence
- Spectral type: F5V
- B−V color index: +0.45

Astrometry

A
| Radial velocity (R_{v}) | +14.6±2.8 km/s |

B
| Proper motion (μ) | RA: −39.763 mas/yr Dec.: +24.058 mas/yr |
| Parallax (π) | 13.0246±0.0192 mas |
| Distance | 250.4 ± 0.4 ly (76.8 ± 0.1 pc) |

Details

A
| Mass | 2.9 M_{☉} |
| Radius | 12.3 R_{☉} |
| Surface gravity (log g) | 2.73 cgs |
| Temperature | 5,370 K |
| Rotational velocity (v sin i) | 5.5 km/s |
| Age | 3.6 Gyr |

B
| Mass | 1.4 M_{☉} |
| Radius | 2.1 R_{☉} |
| Luminosity | 7.5 L_{☉} |
| Surface gravity (log g) | 3.95 cgs |
| Temperature | 6,642 K |
| Rotational velocity (v sin i) | 6.3 km/s |
| Age | 2.7 Gyr |

Other designations
- CPD−57°6619, HD 125628, HIP 70264, HR 5371, SAO 241673

Database references
| SIMBAD | data |

HD 125628 is a binary star system in the constellation Centaurus. It is faintly visible to the naked eye with a combined apparent visual magnitude of 4.76. The distance to this system is approximately 380 light years based on parallax. It is drifting further away from the Sun with a radial velocity of +15 km/s. The absolute magnitude is −0.55.

The primary component of this system, component A, is an aging giant star with a stellar classification of G9III and a visual magnitude of 5.09. The secondary companion, designated component B, is a magnitude 6.94 star located at an angular separation of 9.10″ from the primary, along a position angle of 157°, as of 2016. It is an F-type main-sequence star with a class of F5V.
