= V744 Centauri =

Star in the constellation Centaurus

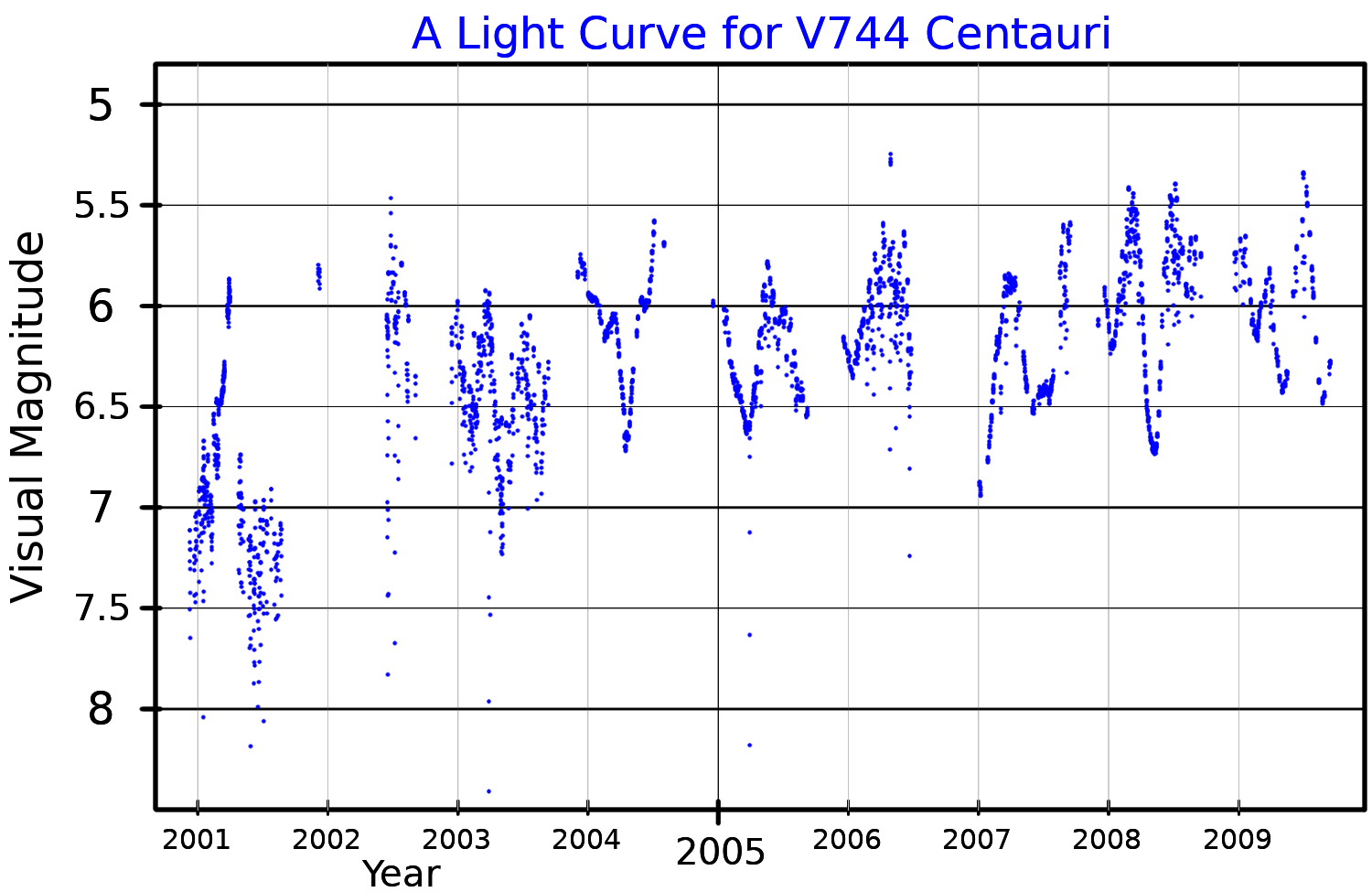
- A visual band light curve for V744 Centauri, plotted from ASAS data

Observation data Epoch J2000 Equinox ICRS
- Constellation: Centaurus
- Right ascension: 13^{h} 39^{m} 59.80667^{s}
- Declination: −49° 56′ 59.8395″
- Apparent magnitude (V): 5.1-6.7

Characteristics
- Spectral type: M5III
- Variable type: Semiregular variable

Astrometry
| Radial velocity (R_{v}) | −10.7 km/s |
| Proper motion (μ) | RA: −100.11±0.24 mas/yr Dec.: +18.74±0.29 mas/yr |
| Parallax (π) | 6.35±0.33 mas |
| Distance | 510 ± 30 ly (157 ± 8 pc) |

Other designations
- CD−49°8095, CPD−49°6265, HD 118767, HIP 66666, HR 5134, SAO 224317, TYC 8269-1422-1, GSC 08269-01422

Database references
| SIMBAD | data |

V744 Centauri, is a semi-regular variable pulsating star in the constellation Centaurus. Located 3 degrees north north east of Epsilon Centauri, It ranges from apparent magnitude 5.1 to 6.7 over 90 days. It is unusual in that it is a red star with a high proper motion (greater than 50 milliarcseconds a year). When it is near its maximum brightness, it is visible to the naked eye under good observing conditions.

In 1964, Wolfgang Strohmeier et al. announced the discovery that the star is a variable star. It was given its variable star designation, V744 Centauri, in 1968.
