= HD 102350 =

Star in the constellation Centaurus

- Location of HD 102350 (circled in red)

Observation data Epoch J2000 Equinox ICRS
- Constellation: Centaurus
- Right ascension: 11^{h} 46^{m} 30.82257^{s}
- Declination: −61° 10′ 42.2364″
- Apparent magnitude (V): 4.11

Characteristics
- Spectral type: G0II or G5Ib/II
- B−V color index: 0.895±0.008
- Variable type: suspected δ Cep

Astrometry
Radial velocity (R_{v})	−3.4±0.7 km/s
Proper motion (μ)	RA: −21.87±0.16 mas/yr Dec.: −16.41±0.15 mas/yr
Parallax (π)	8.37±0.17 mas
Distance	390 ± 8 ly (119 ± 2 pc)
Absolute magnitude (M_{V})	−1.51

Details
Radius	21.96+1.70 −3.27 R_{☉}
Luminosity	282.8±9.0 L_{☉}
Temperature	5,051+424 −185 K

Other designations
- NSV 5325, CD−60°3741, FK5 443, HD 102350, HIP 57439, HR 4522, SAO 251579, WDS J11465-6111A

Database references
SIMBAD	data

HD 102350 is a single star in the constellation Centaurus. It has a yellow hue and is visible to the naked eye with an apparent visual magnitude of 4.11. The distance to this star is approximately 390 light years based on parallax, but it is drifting closer with a radial velocity of −3 km/s. It has an absolute magnitude of −1.51.

This is an aging bright giant star with a stellar classification of G0II. It is a candidate Cepheid variable, but Hipparcos photometry found its brightness to be constant. The star has expanded to 22 times the radius of the Sun and is radiating 283 times the Sun's luminosity from its enlarged photosphere at an effective temperature of 5,051 K. It has a magnitude 13.0 visual companion at an angular separation of 24.3″ along a position angle of 313° relative to the brighter component, as of 2000.

HD 102350 is listed in the Washington Double Star Catalog as having a 13th magnitude companion about 25″ away, but it is a distant background object unrelated to HD 102350.
