= HD 102776 =

Binary star system in the constellation Centaurus

- Location of j Centauri (circled in red)

Observation data Epoch J2000.0 Equinox ICRS
- Constellation: Centaurus
- Right ascension: 11^{h} 49^{m} 41.06733^{s}
- Declination: −63° 47′ 18.5007″
- Apparent magnitude (V): 4.30 (+4.30 - 4.39)

Characteristics
- Evolutionary stage: main sequence
- Spectral type: B3V
- U−B color index: −0.59
- B−V color index: −0.15
- Variable type: γ Cas

Astrometry
Radial velocity (R_{v})	+29.0±4.1 km/s
Proper motion (μ)	RA: −22.022 mas/yr Dec.: +2.755 mas/yr
Parallax (π)	4.5957±0.3290 mas
Distance	710 ± 50 ly (220 ± 20 pc)
Absolute magnitude (M_{V})	−1.98

Details
Mass	5.955 M_{☉} 7.2±0.1 M_{☉}
Radius	5.00±0.10 R_{☉}
Luminosity	1,342 L_{☉}
Surface gravity (log g)	3.20±0.03 cgs
Temperature	20,000±200 K
Rotational velocity (v sin i)	200±4 km/s
Age	31.6±0.6 Myr

Other designations
- j Cen, NSV 5357, CPD−63°1988, FK5 2944, GC 16201, HD 102776, HIP 57669, HR 4537, SAO 251602

Database references
SIMBAD	data

HD 102776, also known by its Bayer designation j Centauri, is a suspected astrometric binary star system in the southern constellation of Centaurus. It has a blue-white hue and is faintly visible to the naked eye with a typical apparent visual magnitude of 4.30. The distance to this star is approximately 710 light years based on parallax, and it is drifting further away with a radial velocity of ~29 km/s. It is a member of the Lower Centaurus Crux subgroup of the Sco OB2 association. HD 102776 has a relatively large peculiar velocity of 31.1 km/s and is a candidate runaway star that was ejected from its association, most likely by a supernova explosion.

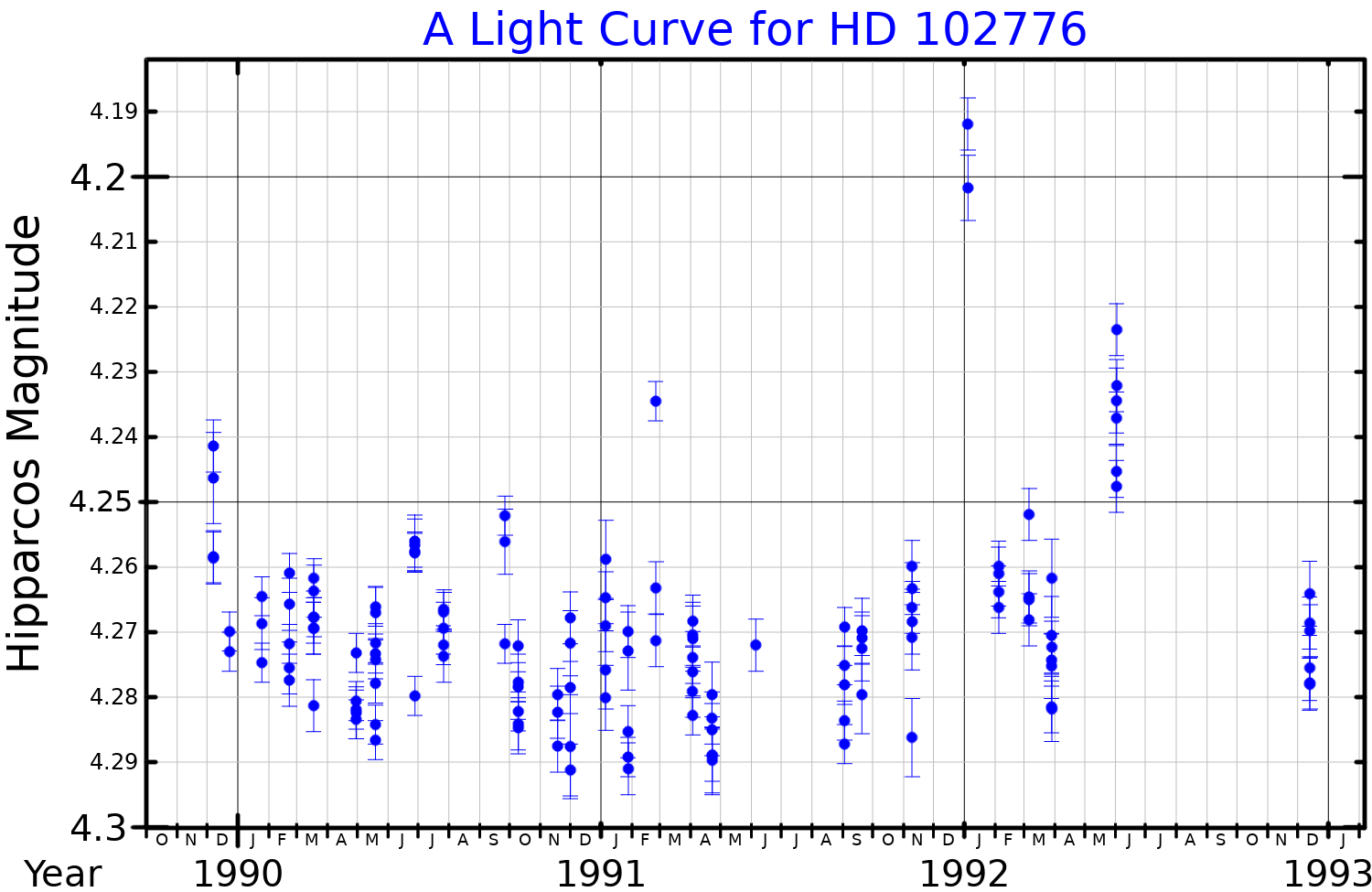
A light curve for HD 102776, plotted from Hipparcos data

The stellar classification of the visible component is B3V, matching a B-type main-sequence star. It is around 32 million years old and is spinning rapidly with estimates of its projected rotational velocity ranging from 200 up to 270 km/s, giving it an equatorial bulge that is up to 11% larger than the polar radius. This is a Be star showing emission features in its Balmer lines due to a circumstellar disk of decreated gas. It is classified as a suspected Gamma Cassiopeiae type variable star with a visual magnitude varying from +4.30 down to +4.39.
