= E Centauri =

B-type or A-type main sequence star in the constellation Centaurus

Observation data Epoch J2000.0 Equinox J2000.0
- Constellation: Centaurus
- Right ascension: 12^{h} 08^{m} 14.70518^{s}
- Declination: −48° 41′ 33.0323″
- Apparent magnitude (V): +5.34

Characteristics
- Evolutionary stage: subgiant
- Spectral type: B9.5/A0V
- B−V color index: −0.010±0.007

Astrometry
Radial velocity (R_{v})	+7.2±0.5 km/s
Proper motion (μ)	RA: −27.271 mas/yr Dec.: −7.342 mas/yr
Parallax (π)	5.8040±0.2042 mas
Distance	560 ± 20 ly (172 ± 6 pc)
Absolute magnitude (M_{V})	−0.97

Details
Mass	3.38±0.09 M_{☉}
Radius	5.84 R_{☉}
Luminosity	302+39 −35 L_{☉}
Surface gravity (log g)	3.16 cgs
Temperature	9,886±69 K
Rotational velocity (v sin i)	74 km/s
Age	277 Myr

Other designations
- E Cen, CD−47°7396, FK5 446, GC 16581, HD 105416, HIP 59184, HR 4620, SAO 223235

Database references
SIMBAD	data

E Centauri is a single star in the southern constellation of Centaurus. It is a white-hued star that is dimly visible to the naked eye with an apparent visual magnitude of +5.34. The distance to this object is approximately 560 light years based on parallax, and it has an absolute magnitude of −0.97. It is drifting closer to the Sun with a radial velocity of +7 km/s, and it is a candidate member of the Lower Centaurus Crux subgroup of the Sco OB2 association.

This is a late B- or early A-type main-sequence star with a stellar classification of B9.5/A0V, which indicates it is generating energy via core hydrogen fusion. It has 3.4 times the mass of the Sun and is spinning with a projected rotational velocity of 74 km/s. The star is radiating 302 times the luminosity of the Sun from its photosphere at an effective temperature of 9,886 K.
