= HD 120987 =

Binary star system in the constellation Centaurus

Observation data Epoch J2000 Equinox ICRS
- Constellation: Centaurus
- Right ascension: 13^{h} 53^{m} 32.76039^{s}
- Declination: −35° 39′ 51.3200″
- Apparent magnitude (V): 5.565 (6.27 / 6.38)‍

Characteristics
- Spectral type: F4V (F0V + F1V)
- U−B color index: −0.03
- B−V color index: +0.44

Astrometry
Radial velocity (R_{v})	−8.00±7.40 km/s
Proper motion (μ)	RA: −83.39 mas/yr Dec.: −25.36 mas/yr
Parallax (π)	19.13±0.93 mas
Distance	170 ± 8 ly (52 ± 3 pc)
Absolute magnitude (M_{V})	+1.84

Orbit
Period (P)	373.0 yr
Semi-major axis (a)	1.519″
Eccentricity (e)	0.775
Inclination (i)	74.2°
Longitude of the node (Ω)	112.3°
Periastron epoch (T)	B 1958.57
Argument of periastron (ω) (secondary)	90.7°

Details

HD 120987 A
Mass	1.56 M_{☉}

HD 120987 B
Mass	1.53 M_{☉}

Other designations
- CD−35°9090, HD 120987, HIP 67819, HR 5222, SAO 204955

Database references
SIMBAD	data

HD 120987 (y Centauri or y Cen) is a star system located in the constellation Centaurus. HD 120987 is a quintuple star system located 50 pc (163 light years) from the Sun. The system has an apparent magnitude of 5.565. Based on the system's parallax, it is located some 172 light-years (52 parsecs) away.

HD 120987 appears to be a single F-type star with the spectral classification F4V, but closer inspection reveals it to be two similar F-type main-sequence stars with spectral classifications of F0V and F1V, respectively. The two orbit each other every 373 years, and are separated by 1.519 arcseconds while taking a very eccentric orbit.
