= HD 110073 =

Star in the constellation Centaurus

- Location of HD 110073 (circled in red)

Observation data Epoch J2000.0 Equinox ICRS
- Constellation: Centaurus
- Right ascension: 12^{h} 39^{m} 52.52839^{s}
- Declination: −55° 58′ 31.8904″
- Apparent magnitude (V): +4.63

Characteristics
- Spectral type: B8II/III
- B−V color index: −0.082±0.013

Astrometry
Radial velocity (R_{v})	+15.1±2.8 km/s
Proper motion (μ)	RA: −43.38 mas/yr Dec.: −25.25 mas/yr
Parallax (π)	8.94±0.24 mas
Distance	365 ± 10 ly (112 ± 3 pc)
Absolute magnitude (M_{V})	−0.61

Details

HD 110073 A
Mass	4.0±0.2 M_{☉}
Radius	3.7 R_{☉}
Luminosity	385 L_{☉}
Surface gravity (log g)	3.35 cgs
Temperature	12,900 K
Metallicity [Fe/H]	−0.90 dex
Rotation	3.03 days
Rotational velocity (v sin i)	46±10 km/s
Age	129 Myr

HD 110073 B
Mass	1.13 M_{☉}
Luminosity	1.2 L_{☉}
Temperature	5,662 K

Other designations
- l Cen, CD−39°7748, HD 110073, HIP 61789, HR 4817, SAO 203681

Database references
SIMBAD	data

HD 110073 is a star in the southern constellation Centaurus, near the southern constellation border with Crux. It has the Bayer designation l Centauri (lower case L), while HD 110073 is the star's identifier from the Henry Draper catalogue. This system is faintlyvisible to the naked eye with an apparent visual magnitude of +4.63. It is located at a distance of approximately 365 light years from the Sun based on parallax, and is drifting further away with a radial velocity of +15 km/s.

This is a single-lined spectroscopic binary star system that belongs to the Pleiades stream. As of 2011, the pair had a linear projected separation of 130.8±12.1 AU. The primary component is a mercury-manganese star with a stellar classification of B8II/III. These stars are often helium-weak, but this is one of the most normal members of this group in terms of helium abundance. The system is a source for X-ray emission, which is most likely coming from the lower mass companion – it may even be a pre-main-sequence star.
