= HD 111968 =

Binary star in the constellation Centaurus

n Centauri
- Location of n Centauri (circled in red)

Observation data Epoch J2000.0 Equinox ICRS
- Constellation: Centaurus
- Right ascension: 12^{h} 53^{m} 26.20^{s}
- Declination: −40° 10′ 43.9″
- Apparent magnitude (V): +4.25

Characteristics
- Spectral type: A7IV or A7V
- B−V color index: +0.224±0.014

Astrometry
Proper motion (μ)	RA: +70.84±0.14 mas/yr Dec.: −22.54±0.10 mas/yr
Parallax (π)	21.95±0.19 mas
Distance	149 ± 1 ly (45.6 ± 0.4 pc)
Absolute magnitude (M_{V})	+0.86

Details

A
Mass	2.07 M_{☉}
Radius	3.3 R_{☉}
Luminosity	34.34 L_{☉}
Surface gravity (log g)	3.87±0.14 cgs
Temperature	7,400 K
Rotational velocity (v sin i)	92.4±4.6 km/s
Age	900 Myr

B
Mass	0.88 M_{☉}
Radius	0.80 R_{☉}
Temperature	5,300 K
Age	900 Myr

Other designations
- n Cen, CD−39°7893, FK5 482, GC 17489, GJ 488.1, GJ 9422, HD 111968, HIP 62896, HR 4889, SAO 203907

Database references
SIMBAD	data

HD 111968, also known by the Bayer designation n Centauri, is a binary star in the southern constellation of Centaurus. It is a white-hued star that is faintly visible to the naked eye with an apparent visual magnitude of +4.25. The star is located at a distance of approximately 149 light years based on parallax. The radial velocity of the star is poorly constrained, with an estimated value of 2.5 km/s.

The primary component is classified as an A-type star but there has been disagreement about the luminosity class. A. de Vaucouleurs in 1957 found a class of III, suggesting this is an evolved giant star. O. J. Eggen gave a class of V in 1962, as did R. O. Gray and R. F. Garrison in 1989, indicating this is a main sequence star. In 1979, N. Houk found a class of IV, meaning this is a subgiant star. It is a young star, some 900 million years old, with 2.07 times the mass of the Sun. It is spinning with a projected rotational velocity of 92 km/s. The star is 3.3 times larger than the Sun, radiating 34 times the luminosity of the Sun from its photosphere at an effective temperature of 7,400 K.

The secondary component is a K-type dwarf, still in the main sequence. It has 88% of the mass and 80% of the radius of the Sun, with an effective temperature of 5,300 K. It has a projected separation of 26 astronomical units from the primary, giving an estimated orbital period of 80 years. It is likely responsible for the X-ray emission coming from the system.

Once the primary component start to evolve, it will lose mass, becoming a white dwarf with a mass of 0.7 M_{☉}, and the orbital distance will be two times wider.
