= HD 110458 =

Star in the constellation Centaurus

- Location of HD 110458 (invisible beside γ Centauri at this scale)

Observation data Epoch J2000.0 Equinox ICRS
- Constellation: Centaurus
- Right ascension: 12^{h} 42^{m} 35.45^{s}
- Declination: −48° 48′ 47.2″
- Apparent magnitude (V): +4.66

Characteristics
- Evolutionary stage: red clump
- Spectral type: K0III
- U−B color index: +1.01
- B−V color index: +1.09

Astrometry
Radial velocity (R_{v})	−11.7±0.8 km/s
Proper motion (μ)	RA: −123.84±0.16 mas/yr Dec.: −30.17±0.13 mas/yr
Parallax (π)	17.11±0.22 mas
Distance	191 ± 2 ly (58.4 ± 0.8 pc)
Absolute magnitude (M_{V})	+0.99±0.028

Details
Mass	1.71 M_{☉}
Radius	11.61+0.23 −0.19 R_{☉}
Luminosity	60.8±2.0 L_{☉}
Surface gravity (log g)	2.61 cgs
Temperature	4,682±26 K
Metallicity [Fe/H]	0.19 dex
Age	2.61 Gyr

Other designations
- w Cen, CD−48°7608, GC 17282, HD 110458, HIP 62012, HR 4831, SAO 223614

Database references
SIMBAD	data

HD 110458 is a single star in the southern constellation of Centaurus. It has the Bayer designation w Centauri, while HD 110458 is the star's identifier in the Henry Draper Catalogue. The star has an orange hue and is faintly visible to the naked eye with an apparent visual magnitude of +4.66. It is located at a distance of approximately 191 light years from the Sun based on parallax, but is drifting closer with a radial velocity of −12 km/s. Based on its space motion, in 1972 O. J. Eggen listed it as a probable member of the Hyades group.

The stellar classification of HD 110458 is K0III, which indicates this is an aging giant star that has exhausted the supply of hydrogen at its core. It is estimated to be 2.6 billion years old with 1.7 times the mass of the Sun and has expanded to 11.6 times the girth of the Sun. The star is radiating 61 times the luminosity of the Sun from its enlarged photosphere at an effective temperature of 4,682 K.
