= N Centauri =

Binary star in the constellation Centaurus

Observation data Epoch J2000.0 Equinox J2000.0
Constellation	Centaurus
- A
Right ascension	13^{h} 52^{m} 04.86231^{s}
Declination	−52° 48′ 41.5063″
- Apparent magnitude (V): 5.26
- B
Right ascension	13^{h} 52^{m} 02.97130^{s}
Declination	−52° 48′ 35.7079″
- Apparent magnitude (V): 7.49

Characteristics

A
- Evolutionary stage: main sequence
- Spectral type: B9V
- B−V color index: −0.084±0.003

B
- Evolutionary stage: main sequence
- Spectral type: F0Vn
- B−V color index: +0.286±0.009

Astrometry

A
Radial velocity (R_{v})	+27.0±4.2 km/s
Proper motion (μ)	RA: −38.997 mas/yr Dec.: −26.863 mas/yr
Parallax (π)	10.7449±0.0882 mas
Distance	304 ± 2 ly (93.1 ± 0.8 pc)
Absolute magnitude (M_{V})	+0.76

B
Radial velocity (R_{v})	+11.17±0.46 km/s
Proper motion (μ)	RA: −38.997 mas/yr Dec.: −26.863 mas/yr
Parallax (π)	10.7449±0.0882 mas
Distance	304 ± 2 ly (93.1 ± 0.8 pc)

Details

A
Mass	3.04 M_{☉}
Radius	2.458 R_{☉}
Luminosity	70.18 L_{☉}
Surface gravity (log g)	4.32±0.14 cgs
Temperature	13,032±443 K
Rotational velocity (v sin i)	205 km/s
Age	66 Myr

B
Mass	1.48±0.01 M_{☉}
Radius	1.61+0.08 −0.09 R_{☉}
Luminosity	6.43 L_{☉}
Surface gravity (log g)	4.29 cgs
Temperature	7,354 K
Metallicity [Fe/H]	−0.01+0.17 −0.15 dex
Age	1.07+1.56 −0.42 Gyr

Other designations
- N Cen, CCDM J13521-5249, WDS J13521-5249
- A: CPD−52°6787, GC 18720, HD 120642, HIP 67703, HR 5207, SAO 241239
- B: CD−52°5831, GC 18718, HD 120641, HIP 67702, SAO 241238

Database references
SIMBAD	A
- B

N Centauri is a binary star in the southern constellation of Centaurus. The brighter star is dimly visible to the naked eye with an apparent visual magnitude of 5.26, and it is approximately 304 light years away based on parallax. It has an absolute magnitude of +0.76 and is drifting further away from the Sun with a radial velocity of +27 km/s. It is a candidate member of the Sco OB2 moving group.

The double nature of this system was discovered by German astronomer Carl Rümker in 1835. As of 2016, the companion lay at an angular separation of 18.5″ along a position angle of 289° from the primary. They form a co-moving pair with a projected separation of 1,566 AU. The more luminous member is a B-type main-sequence star with a stellar classification of B9V. Its fainter companion is an F-type main-sequence star with a class of F0Vn, where the 'n' suffix indicates that the metal absorption lines in its spectrum are unusual broad ("nebulous") and indicative of rapid rotation. Based upon discrepancies in the proper motion measurements, there are hints of a third member of this system.
