= K Centauri =

Star in the constellation Centaurus

Observation data Epoch J2000.0 Equinox ICRS
- Constellation: Centaurus
- Right ascension: 13^{h} 29^{m} 25.25471^{s}
- Declination: −51° 09′ 54.5048″
- Apparent magnitude (V): +5.04

Characteristics
- Spectral type: A1V
- U−B color index: +0.07
- B−V color index: +0.059±0.003

Astrometry
Radial velocity (R_{v})	−2.0±4.2 km/s
Proper motion (μ)	RA: −2.094 mas/yr Dec.: −5.548 mas/yr
Parallax (π)	7.9861±0.2224 mas
Distance	410 ± 10 ly (125 ± 3 pc)
Absolute magnitude (M_{V})	−0.91

Details
Mass	3.128 M_{☉}
Radius	6.635 R_{☉}
Luminosity	248 L_{☉}
Surface gravity (log g)	2.982 cgs
Temperature	9,167 K
Rotational velocity (v sin i)	220.4±2.4 km/s

Other designations
- K Cen, CD−50°7812, GC 18220, HD 117150, HIP 65810, HR 5071, SAO 240883

Database references
SIMBAD	data

K Centauri is a possible binary star in the southern constellation of Centaurus. It has a white hue and is bright enough to be visible to the naked eye, having an apparent visual magnitude of +5.04.

K Centauri is located at a distance of approximately 410 light years from the Sun based on parallax, and it has an absolute magnitude of −0.91. This is an ordinary A-type main-sequence star with a stellar classification of A1V. It is spinning rapidly with a projected rotational velocity of 220 km/s, which is giving it a pronounced equatorial bulge that is 25% larger than the polar radius.

Analysis of Hipparcos and Gaia astrometry suggests that the relatively large margins of error in the calculated parallax may be due to orbital motion caused by an unseen companion. The companion would be an 81 M_{J} object orbiting at about 2 AU.
