= HD 111597 =

Star in the constellation Centaurus

- Location of HD 111597 (circled in red)

Observation data Epoch J2000.0 Equinox ICRS
- Constellation: Centaurus
- Right ascension: 12^{h} 50^{m} 41.16339^{s}
- Declination: −33° 59′ 57.6527″
- Apparent magnitude (V): 4.90

Characteristics
- Spectral type: B9V
- B−V color index: −0.031±0.002

Astrometry
Radial velocity (R_{v})	+4.00±4.20 km/s
Proper motion (μ)	RA: −29.710 mas/yr Dec.: −13.778 mas/yr
Parallax (π)	7.9731±0.2191 mas
Distance	410 ± 10 ly (125 ± 3 pc)
Absolute magnitude (M_{V})	−0.53

Details

primary
Mass	4.3 M_{☉}
Radius	4.3 R_{☉}
Luminosity	169 L_{☉}
Surface gravity (log g)	3.58 cgs
Temperature	10,043 K
Rotational velocity (v sin i)	230 km/s
Age	321 Myr

secondary
Mass	0.35 M_{☉}

Other designations
- p Cen, CD−33°8653, FK5 1331, HD 111597, HIP 62683, HR 4874, SAO 203863, CCDM J12507-3400, WDS J12507-3400A

Database references
SIMBAD	data

HD 111597 is a suspected astrometric binary star system in the southern constellation of Centaurus. It has the Bayer designation p Centauri, while HD 111597 is the star's identifier from the Henry Draper catalogue. The system is visible to the naked eye as a faint point of light with an apparent visual magnitude of 4.90. It is located at a distance of approximately 410 light years from the Sun based on parallax, and has an absolute magnitude of −0.53. The system is a probable member of the Sco OB2 association of co-moving stars. The visible component is a B-type main-sequence star with a stellar classification of B9V.
