= HD 119921 =

Star in the constellation Centaurus

Observation data Epoch J2000 Equinox ICRS
- Constellation: Centaurus
- Right ascension: 13^{h} 46^{m} 56.35149^{s}
- Declination: −36° 15′ 06.9563″
- Apparent magnitude (V): 5.15

Characteristics
- Spectral type: A0 V or B9.5 III-n

Astrometry
Radial velocity (R_{v})	−9.8±2.8 km/s
Proper motion (μ)	RA: −13.293 mas/yr Dec.: −11.115 mas/yr
Parallax (π)	7.7881±0.2382 mas
Distance	420 ± 10 ly (128 ± 4 pc)
Absolute magnitude (M_{V})	−0.48

Details
Mass	2.6 M_{☉}
Radius	4.1 R_{☉}
Luminosity	160 L_{☉}
Surface gravity (log g)	3.62 cgs
Temperature	10,102 K
Rotational velocity (v sin i)	220 km/s
Age	337 Myr

Other designations
- z Cen, CD−35°8995, FK5 3091, HD 119921, HIP 67244, HR 5174, SAO 204835, WDS J13469-3615A

Database references
SIMBAD	data

HD 119921 is a single, white-hued star in the southern constellation of Centaurus. it has the Bayer designation z Centauri. This is faintly visible to the naked eye, having an apparent visual magnitude of 5.15. It forms a wide double star with a faint, magnitude 12.50 visual companion, which is located at an angular separation of 27.20″ as of 2010. HD 119921 is moving closer to us with a heliocentric radial velocity of around −10 km/s, and is currently located some 420±10 light year from the Sun. At that distance, the visual magnitude of this star is diminished by 0.15 from extinction due to interstellar dust.

This is an A-type main-sequence star with a stellar classification of A0 V, per Houk (1979). However, Gray & Garrison (1987) have it classed as B9.5 III-n, suggesting it is a more evolved giant star. HD 119921 is spinning rapidly with a projected rotational velocity of 220 km/s. The star is radiating around 160 times the Sun's luminosity from its photosphere at an effective temperature of 10,102 K.

In 1983, Molaro et al. reported the presence of super-ionized elements (triple-ionized carbon and silicon) in the far ultraviolet spectrum of HD 119921. These anomalous features are not normally detected from a star in this temperature range. Instead, these blue-shifted absorption features may originate in the local interstellar medium.
