= Xi1 Centauri =

Star in the constellation Centaurus

ξ^{1} Centauri
- Location of ξ^{1} Centauri (circled)

Observation data Epoch J2000.0 Equinox J2000.0 (ICRS)
- Constellation: Centaurus
- Right ascension: 13^{h} 03^{m} 33.305^{s}
- Declination: −49° 31′ 38.15″
- Apparent magnitude (V): +4.83

Characteristics
- Evolutionary stage: Main sequence
- Spectral type: A0 V
- U−B color index: +0.014
- B−V color index: +0.030

Astrometry
Radial velocity (R_{v})	0.00±3.70 km/s
Proper motion (μ)	RA: −47.858 mas/yr Dec.: −11.496 mas/yr
Parallax (π)	14.8276±0.1073 mas
Distance	220 ± 2 ly (67.4 ± 0.5 pc)
Absolute magnitude (M_{V})	+0.68

Details
Mass	2.39 M_{☉}
Radius	2.7 R_{☉}
Luminosity	43.2 L_{☉}
Surface gravity (log g)	4.11±0.14 cgs
Temperature	10,462±356 K
Rotational velocity (v sin i)	185 km/s
Age	125 Myr

Other designations
- ξ^{1} Cen, CD−48° 7887, HD 113314, HIP 63724, HR 4933, SAO 223870

Database references
SIMBAD	data

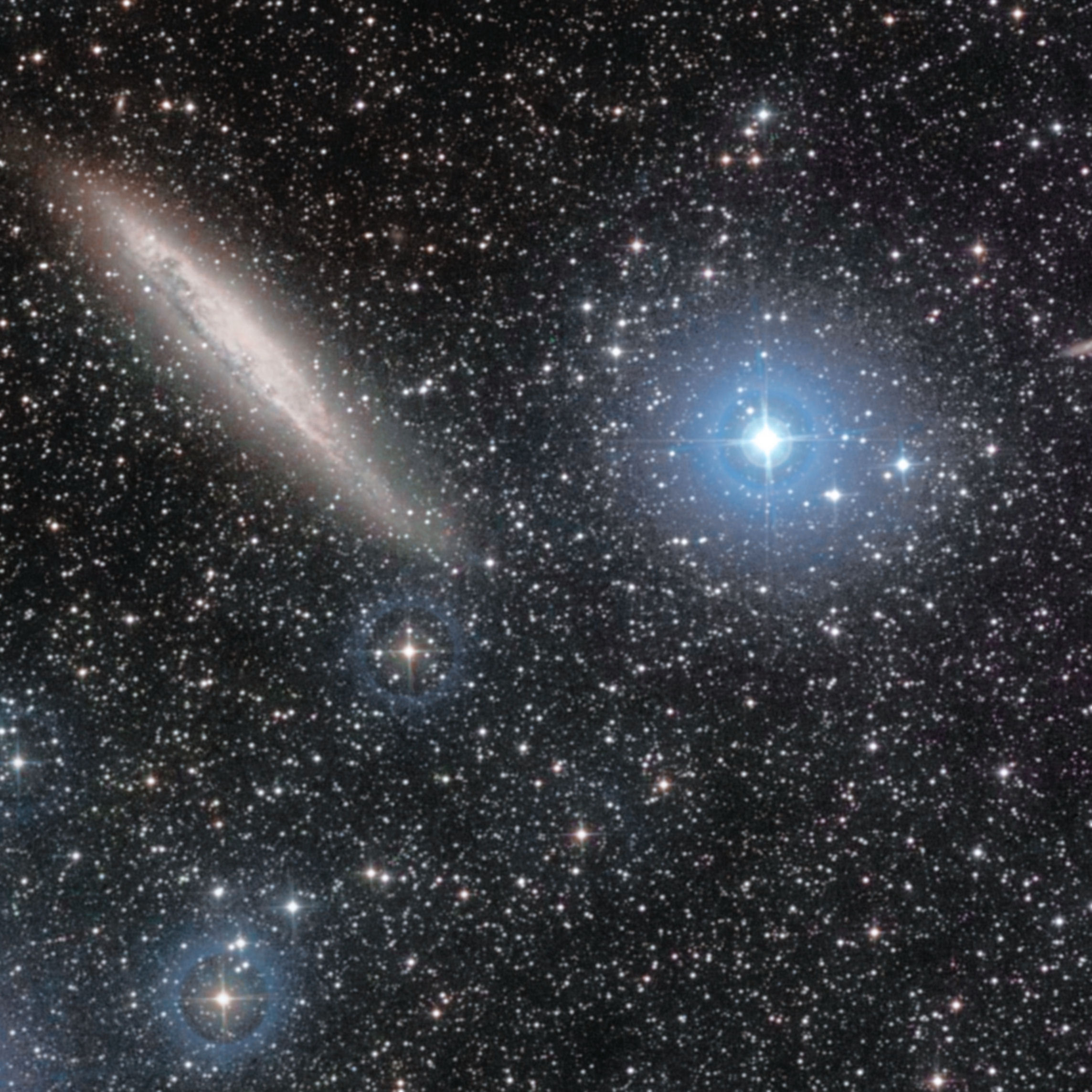
ξ^{1} Cen is the brightest star in the picture, at the right of the galaxy NGC 4945.

Xi^{1} Centauri is a solitary star in the southern constellation of Centaurus. Its name is a Bayer designation that is Latinized from ξ^{1} Centauri, and abbreviated Xi^{1} Cen or ξ^{1} Cen. This star is visible to the naked eye with an apparent visual magnitude of +4.83. With an annual parallax shift of 14.83 mas, it is located around 220 light years from the Sun. At that distance, the apparent visual magnitude of the star is diminished by an interstellar extinction factor of 0.10 due to intervening dust. Just 17 arc minutes to the east of Xi^{1} Centauri lies the galaxy NGC 4945.

This is an A-type main sequence star with a stellar classification of A0 V. It is about 125 million years old with a relatively high rate of spin, having a projected rotational velocity of 185 km/s. The star has an estimated 2.4 times the mass of the Sun and about 2.7 times the Sun's radius. It is radiating 43 times the solar luminosity from its outer atmosphere at an effective temperature of 10,462 K.
