= Hyades Stream =

Moving group in the constellation Taurus

The Hyades Stream (or Hyades moving group) is a large collection of scattered stars that also share a similar trajectory with the Hyades Cluster. In 1869, Richard A. Proctor observed that numerous stars at large distances from the Hyades share a similar motion through space. In 1908, Lewis Boss reported almost 25 years of observations to support this premise, arguing for the existence of a co-moving group of stars that he called the Taurus Stream (now generally known as the Hyades Stream or, following Olin J. Eggen who assumed that it was a vestige of an initially more massive cluster which had partly evaporated, the Hyades Supercluster). Boss published a chart that traced the scattered stars' movements back to a common point of convergence.

Eggen's argument that groups of this type are in fact cluster remnants has been debated. It has been noted that because such phenomena may also be the result of other dynamical mechanisms. Famaey B, et al. report that about 85% of stars in the Hyades Stream have been shown to be completely unrelated to the original cluster on the grounds of dissimilar age and metallicity; their common motion is attributed to tidal effects of the massive rotating bar at the center of the Milky Way Galaxy. Among the remaining members of the Hyades Stream, the exoplanet host star Iota Horologii has recently been proposed as an escaped member of the primordial Hyades Cluster.
