= CA83 =

CA83 or CA-83 may refer to:

- California State Route 83, a highway in the US state of California
- Maibara Station, a railway station in Maibara, Japan (station code CA83)
- Caldwell 83, a star cluster
