= NGC 5253 =

Galaxy in the M83 group of galaxies

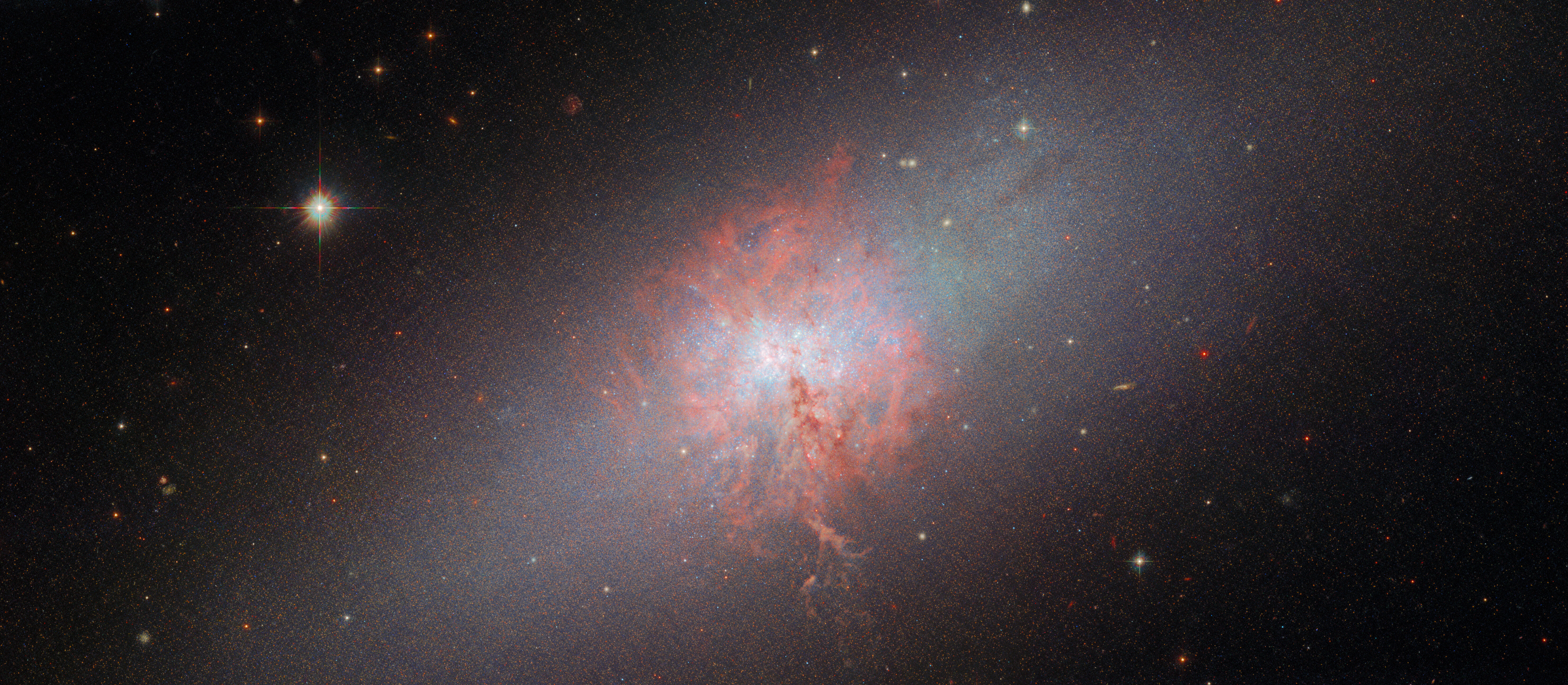
- NGC 5253 is one of the nearest of the known Blue Compact Dwarf (BCD) galaxies

Observation data (J2000 epoch)
- Constellation: Centaurus
- Right ascension: 13^{h} 39^{m} 55.9561^{s}
- Declination: −31° 38′ 24.364″
- Redshift: 407 ± 3 km/s
- Distance: 10.9 ± 0.6 Mly (3.33 ± 0.17 Mpc)
- Apparent magnitude (V): 10.9

Characteristics
- Type: Im pec
- Size: 27,300 ly (8.37 kpc) (estimated)
- Apparent size (V): 5.0′ × 1.9′

Other designations
- Haro 10, ESO 445- G 004, IRAS 13370-3123, UGCA 369, MCG -05-32-060, PGC 48334

NGC 5253 is an irregular galaxy in the constellation Centaurus. It was discovered by William Herschel on 15 March 1787.

== Properties ==
NGC 5253 is located within the M83 Subgroup of the Centaurus A/M83 Group, a relatively nearby galaxy group that includes the radio galaxy Centaurus A and the spiral galaxy M83 (the Southern Pinwheel Galaxy). NGC 5253 is considered a dwarf starburst galaxy and also a blue compact galaxy.

== Supernovae ==
Two supernovae have been observed in NGC 5253:

- SN 1895B (type unknown, mag. 8) was discovered by Williamina Fleming on 7 July 1895.
- SN 1972E (Type Ia, mag. 8.5), the second-brightest recent supernova visible from Earth, was discovered by Charles Kowal on 13 May 1972. With a peak apparent magnitude of 8.5, the only brighter supernova observed in the 20th century was SN 1987A.

== Contents ==
NGC 5253 contains a giant dust cloud hiding a cluster (believed to be a super star cluster) of more than one million stars, among them up to 7,000 O-type stars. The cluster is 3 million years old and has a total luminosity of more than one billion suns. It is the site of efficient star formation, with a rate at least 10 times higher than comparable regions in the Milky Way.

== Image gallery ==
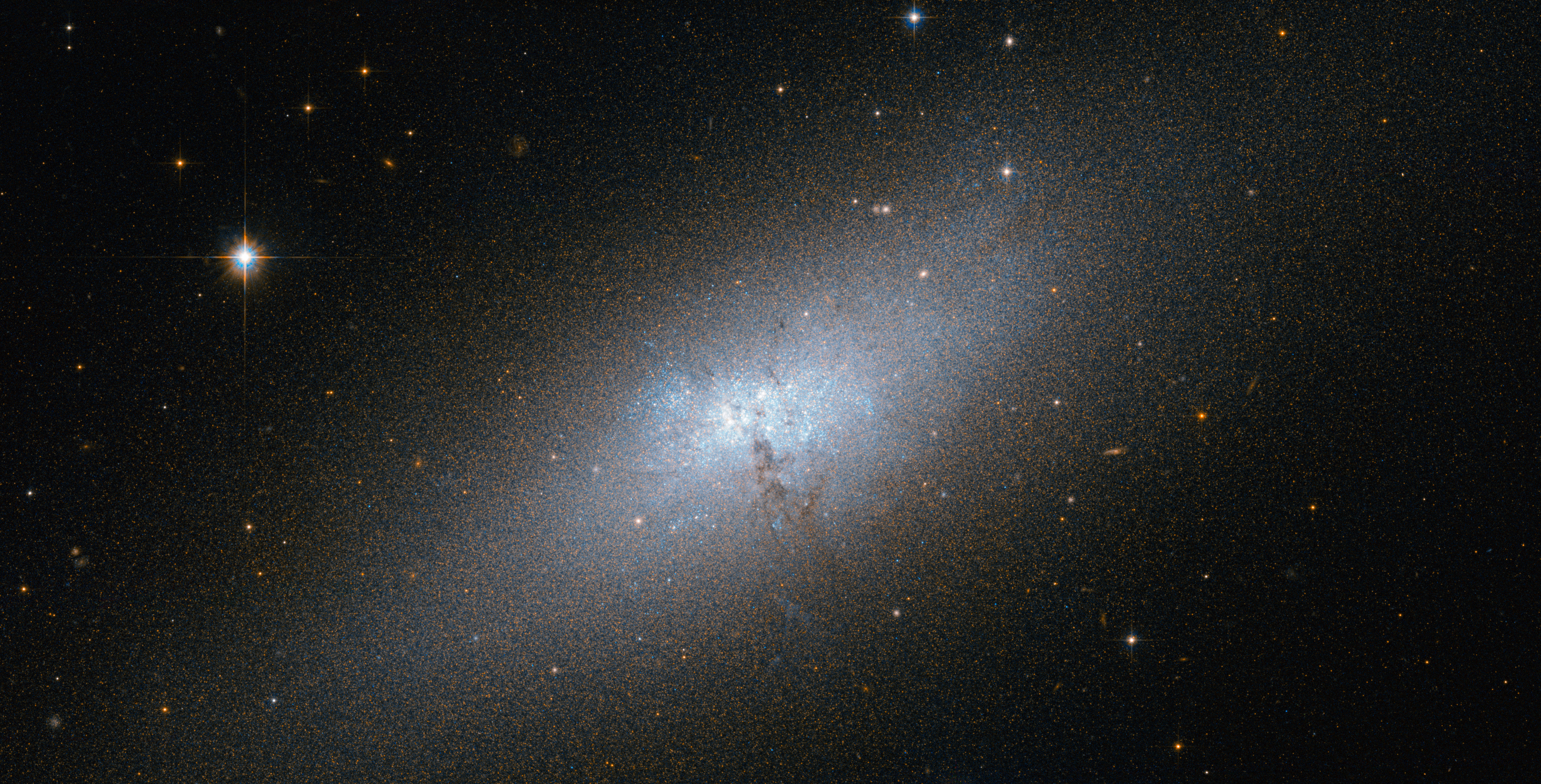
NGC 5253 imaged by the Hubble Space Telescope

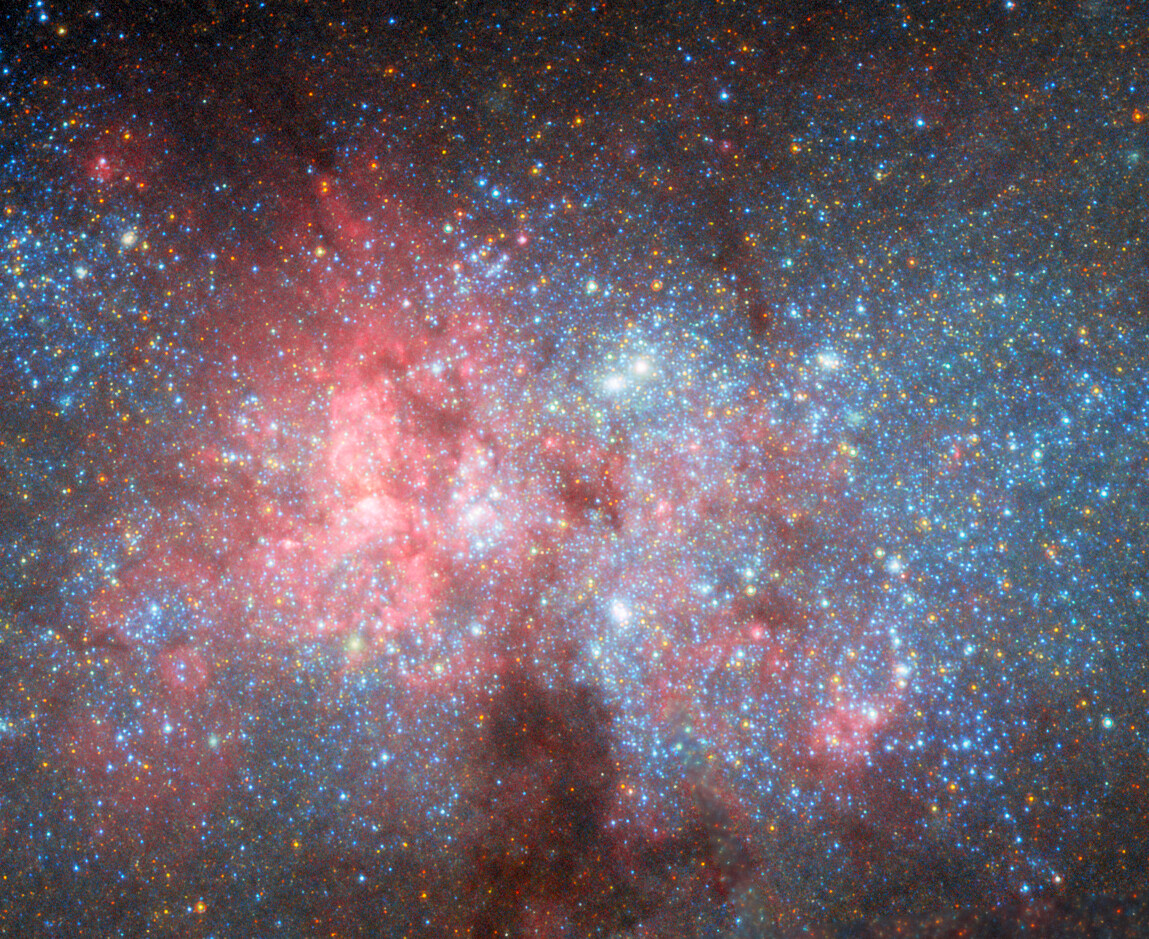
The nucleus of NGC 5253 imaged by the Hubble Space Telescope
