= Messier 83 =

Galaxy in the constellation Hydra

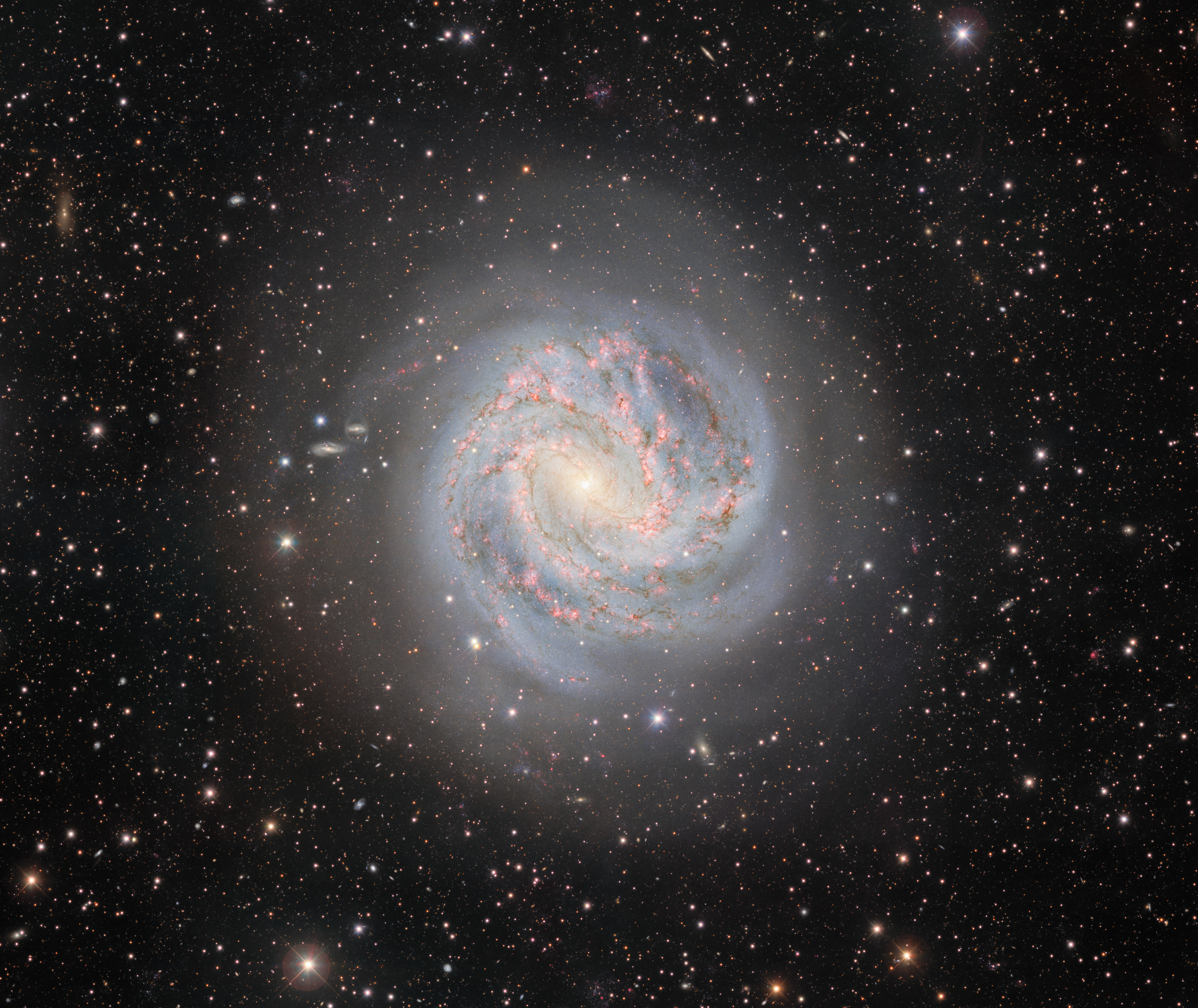
- Messier 83 imaged by the Víctor M. Blanco Telescope in 2024

Observation data (J2000 epoch)
- Constellation: Hydra
- Right ascension: 13^{h} 37^{m} 00.919^{s}
- Declination: −29° 51′ 56.74″
- Redshift: 0.001721±0.000013
- Heliocentric radial velocity: 508 km/s
- Distance: 14.7 Mly (4.50 Mpc)
- Apparent magnitude (V): 7.6

Characteristics
- Type: SAB(s)c
- Size: 36.24 kiloparsecs (118,000 light-years) (diameter; 26.0 mag/arcsec^{2} B-band isophote)
- Apparent size (V): 12′.9 × 11′.5

Other designations
- Southern Pinwheel Galaxy, ESO 444- G 081, IRAS 13341-2936, NGC 5236, UGCA 366, MCG -05-32-050, PGC 48082

Messier 83 or M83, also known as the Southern Pinwheel Galaxy and NGC 5236, is a barred spiral galaxy approximately 15 million light-years away from Earth in the constellation borders of Hydra and Centaurus. Nicolas-Louis de Lacaille discovered M83 on 17 February 1752 at the Cape of Good Hope. Charles Messier added it to his catalogue of nebulous objects (now known as the Messier Catalogue) in March 1781.

It is one of the closest and brightest barred spiral galaxies in the sky, and is visible with binoculars. It has an isophotal diameter at about 36.24 kiloparsecs (118,000 light-years). Its nickname of the Southern (Note: Its declination means every day it passes the zenith of the sky at the matching parallel of the earth, which is that of northern Argentina. It can be viewed more than an ideal 15° above the horizon for a further 75° to the north, placing such a northern limit of good observation at the 45th parallel north) Pinwheel derives from its resemblance to the Pinwheel Galaxy (M101).

== Characteristics ==
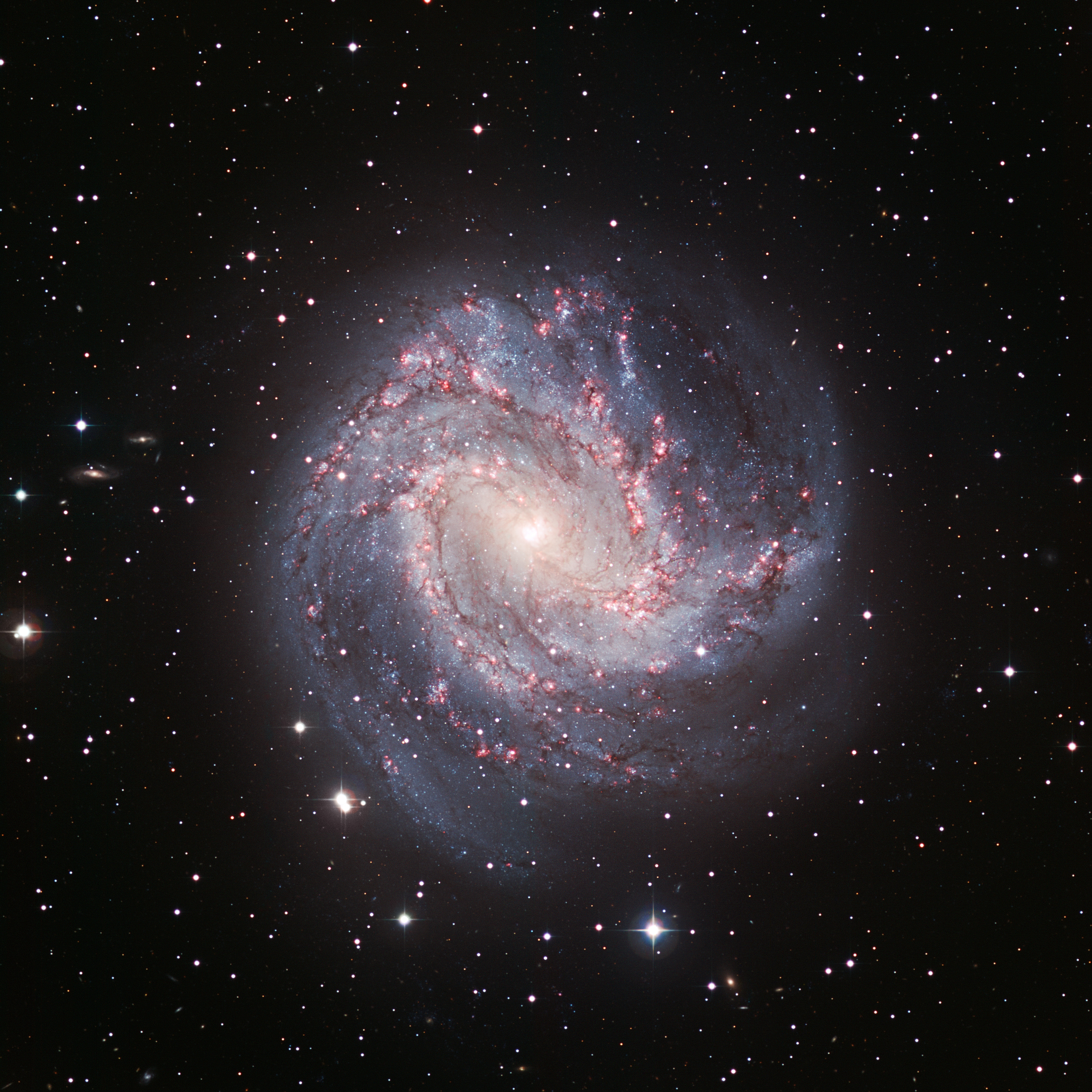
Messier 83 captured by the Wide Field Imager at ESO's La Silla Observatory in September 2008

M83 is a massive, grand design spiral galaxy. Its morphological classification in the De Vaucouleurs system is SAB(s)c, where the 'SAB' denotes a weak-barred spiral, '(s)' indicates a pure spiral structure with no ring, and 'c' means the spiral arms are loosely wound. The peculiar dwarf galaxy NGC 5253 lies near M83, and the two likely interacted within the last billion years resulting in starburst activity in their central regions.

The star formation rate in M83 is higher along the leading edge of the spiral arms, as predicted by density wave theory. NASA's Galaxy Evolution Explorer project on 16 April 2008 reported finding large numbers of new stars in the outer reaches of the galaxy—20 kpc from the center. It had been thought that these areas lacked the materials necessary for star formation.

In April 2025 it was published that first clues were found for the possible existence of a supermassive black hole at the center of M83.

== Supernovae ==
Six supernovae have been observed in M83:

- SN 1923A (type unknown, mag. 14) was discovered by Carl Otto Lampland on 5 May 1923.
- SN 1945B (type unknown, mag. 14.2) was discovered by William Liller on 13 July 1945.
- SN 1950B (type unknown, mag. 14.5) was discovered by Guillermo Haro on 15 March 1950.
- SN 1957D (type unknown, mag. 15) was discovered by Howard S. Gates on 28 December 1957.
- SN 1968L (Type II-P, mag. 11.9) was discovered by John C. Bennett on 17 July 1968.
- SN 1983N (Type Ia, mag. 11.9) was discovered by Robert Evans from Australia on 3 July 1983. On 6 July, it was observed with the Very Large Array and became the first Type I supernova to have a radio emission detected. The supernova reached peak optical brightness on 17 July, achieving an apparent visual magnitude of 11.54. Although identified as Type I, the spectrum was considered peculiar. A year after the explosion, about 0.3 M_{☉} of iron was discovered in the ejecta. This was the first time that such a large amount of iron was unambiguously detected from a supernova explosion. SN 1983N became the modern prototype of a hydrogen deficient Type Ib supernova, with the progenitor being inferred as a Wolf–Rayet star.

== Environment ==
M83 is at the center of one of two subgroups within the Centaurus A/M83 Group, a nearby galaxy group. Centaurus A is at the center of the other subgroup. These are sometimes identified as one group, and sometimes as two. However, the galaxies around Centaurus A and the galaxies around M83 are physically close to each other, and both subgroups appear not to be moving relative to each other.

In another study by A.M. Garcia, M83 is considered to be part of a galaxy group known as LGG 355. It has at least 4 members, which are NGC 5264, IC 4316 and ESO 444-78.

== See also ==
- List of Messier objects
- M83 (band), the band named after the galaxy
