= NGC 5011 =

Galaxy in the constellation Centaurus

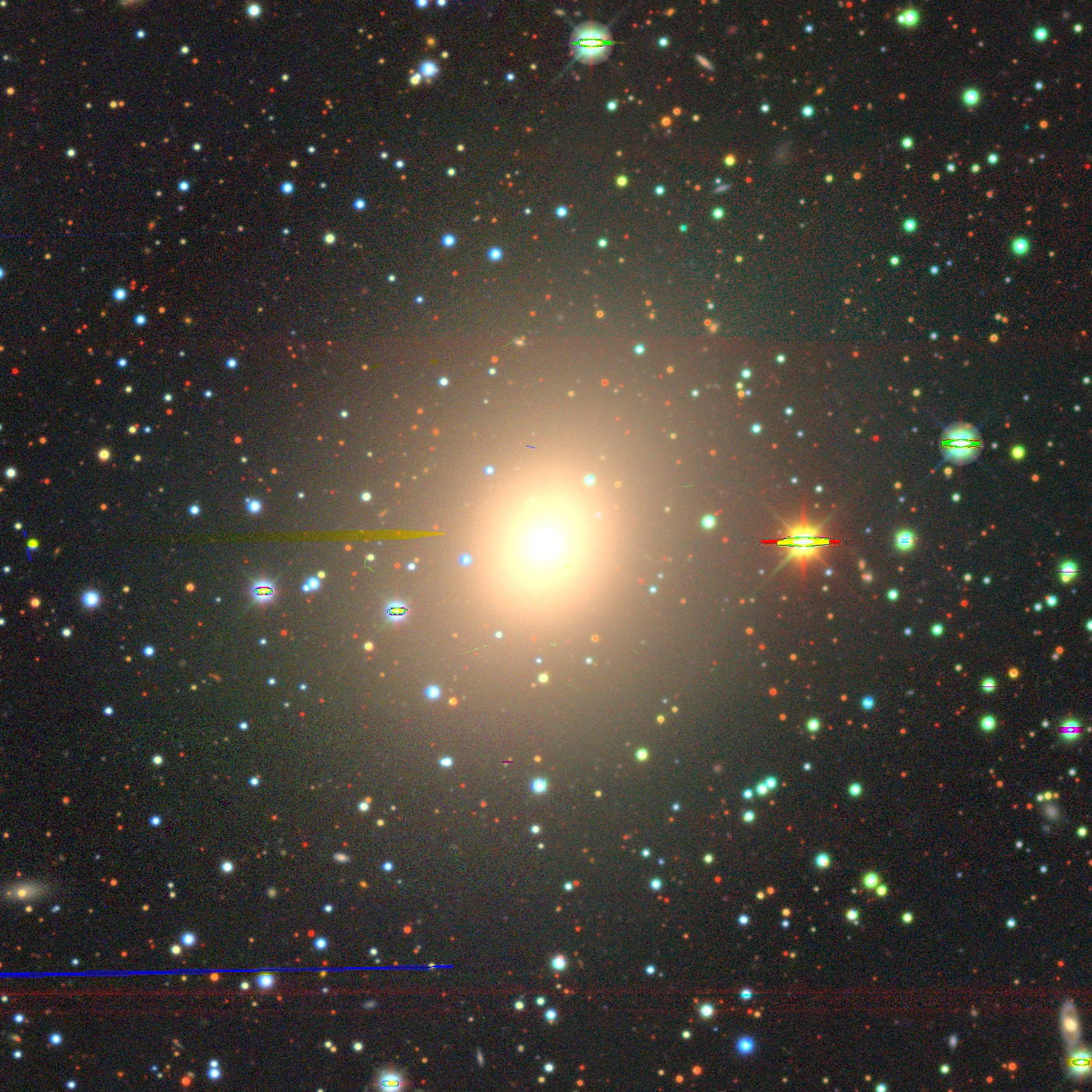
- NGC 5011 imaged by Legacy Surveys

Observation data (J2000 epoch)
- Constellation: Centaurus
- Right ascension: 13^{h} 12^{m} 51.848^{s}
- Declination: −43° 05′ 46.25″
- Redshift: 0.010537
- Heliocentric radial velocity: 3159 km/s
- Distance: 133.26 ± 18.56 Mly (40.857 ± 5.692 Mpc)
- Apparent magnitude (V): 11.33
- Apparent magnitude (B): 12.14

Characteristics
- Type: E1-2
- Size: 92,800 ly (28,440 pc) (Note: 2MASS K_{S} values used.)
- Apparent size (V): 1.763′ × 1.552′

Other designations
- MGC-07-27-042, PGC 45898

NGC 5011 is an elliptical galaxy in the constellation of Centaurus. It was discovered on 3 June 1834 by John Herschel. It was described as "pretty bright, considerably small, round, among 4 stars" by John Louis Emil Dreyer, the compiler of the New General Catalogue.

== Optical companions ==
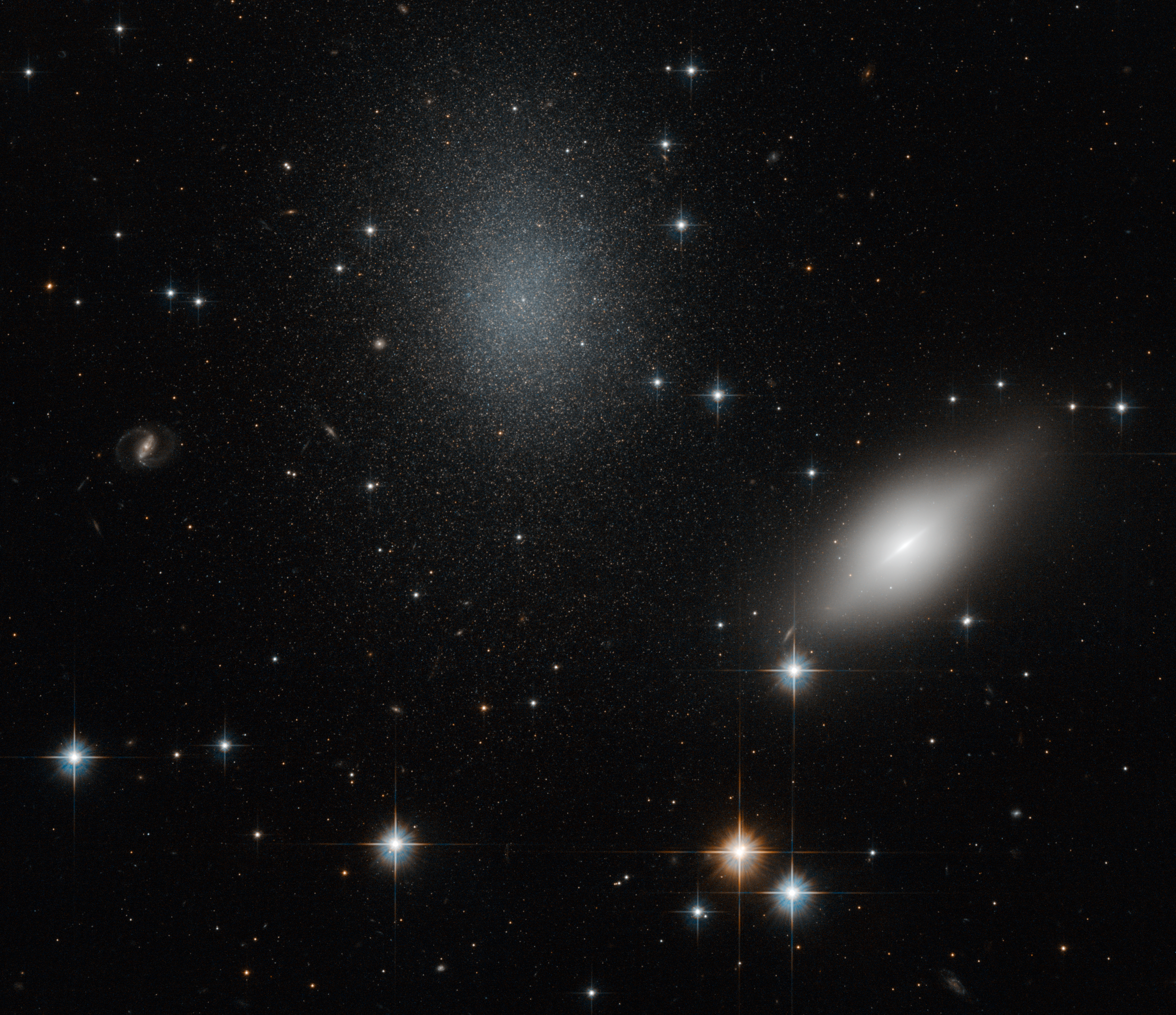
HST image of NGC 5011B (right) and NGC 5011C (left)

Several galaxies are not physically associated with NGC 5011, but appear close to NGC 5011 in the night sky. PGC 45847 is a spiral galaxy that is also known as NGC 5011A. PGC 45918 is a lenticular galaxy some 156 million light-years away from the Earth, in the Centaurus Cluster, and is designated NGC 5011B. PGC 45917 is a dwarf galaxy, also designated NGC 5011C. Although NGC 5011B and 5011C appear close together, they are no signs of them interacting. NGC 5011C is actually much closer and is in the Centaurus A/M83 Group, at 13 million light years away.
