= NGC 5408 =

Irregular galaxy in the constellation Centaurus

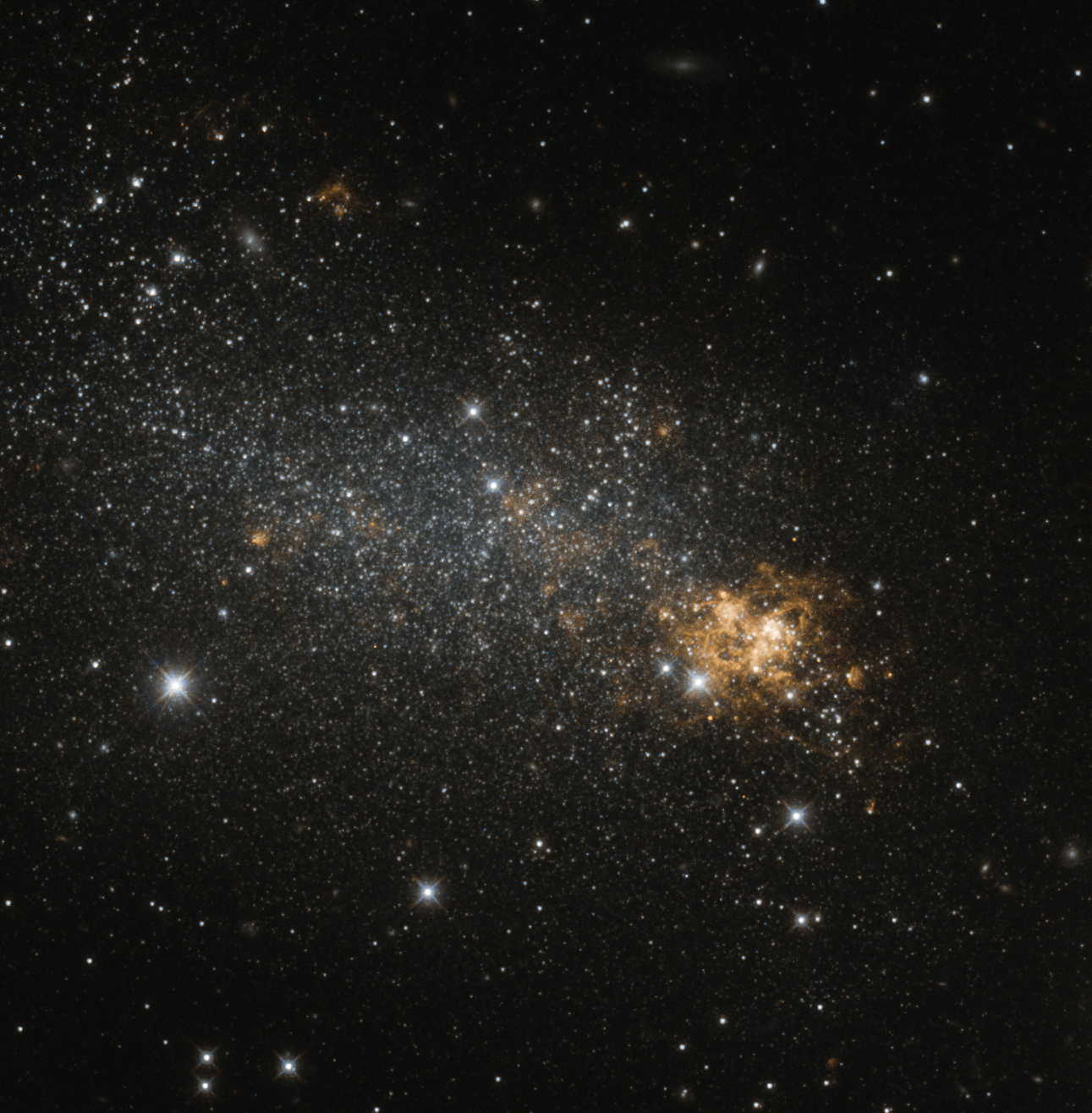
- NGC 5408 imaged by HST

Observation data (J2000 epoch)
- Constellation: Centaurus
- Right ascension: 14^{h} 03^{m} 20.9^{s}
- Declination: −41° 22′ 40″
- Redshift: 506 ± 3 km/s
- Distance: 15.7 Mly (4.81 Mpc)
- Apparent magnitude (V): 12.2

Characteristics
- Type: IB(s)m
- Apparent size (V): 1.6′ × 0.8′

Other designations
- PGC 50073

NGC 5408 is an irregular galaxy in the constellation Centaurus. It was discovered by John Herschel on June 5, 1834.

== Galaxy group information ==
NGC 5408 is located near the M83 Subgroup of the Centaurus A/M83 Group, a relatively nearby group of galaxies. However, it is unclear as to whether NGC 5408 is part of the group.
