= NGC 4945 =

Galaxy in the constellation Centaurus

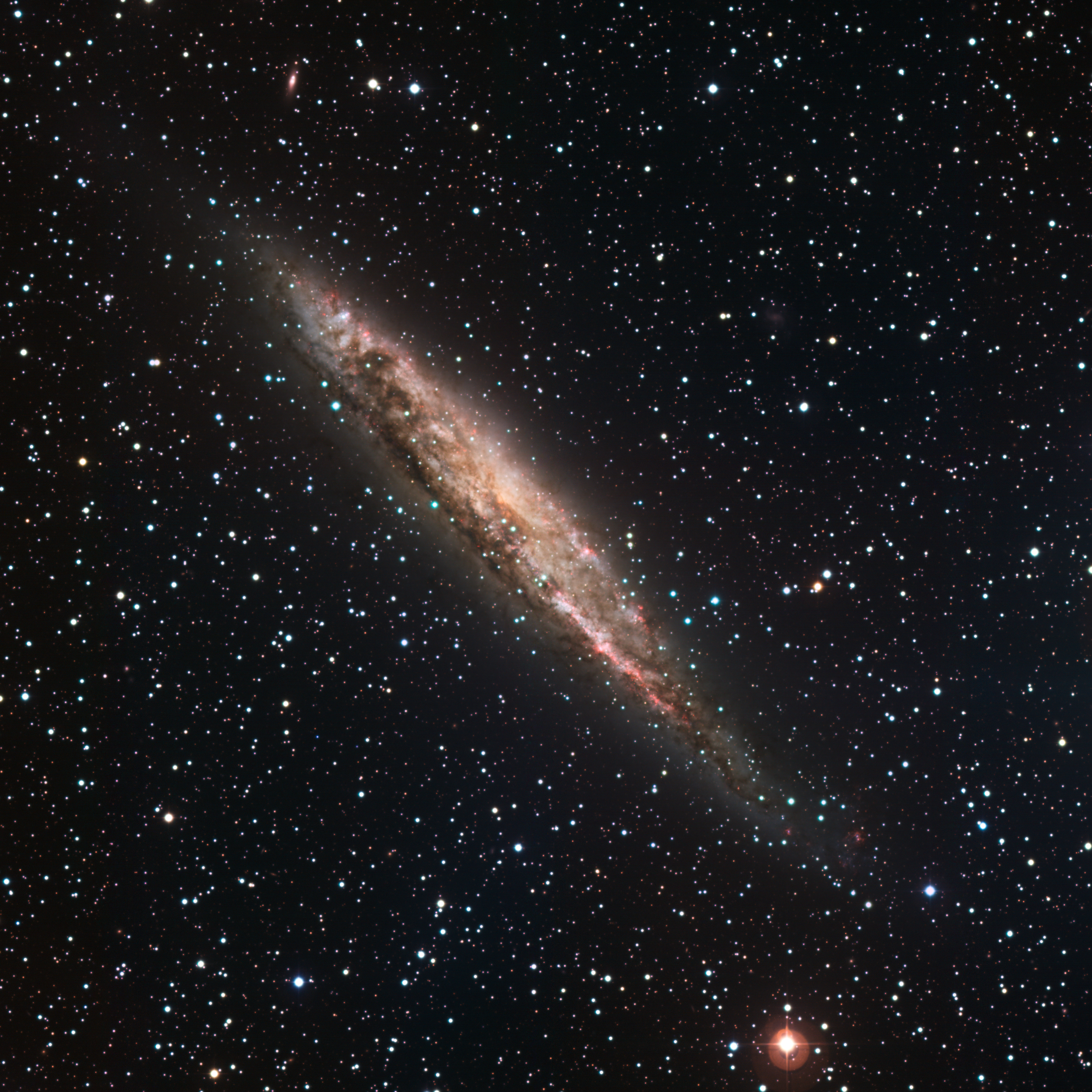
- NGC 4945 image taken by the MPG/ESO 2.2-metre telescope at La Silla Observatory

Observation data (J2000 epoch)
- Constellation: Centaurus
- Right ascension: 13^{h} 05^{m} 27.279^{s}
- Declination: −49° 28′ 04.44″
- Redshift: 0.001868±0.00002
- Heliocentric radial velocity: 563±3 km/s
- Distance: 10.96 ± 0.55 Mly (3.36 ± 0.17 Mpc)
- Group or cluster: Centaurus A/M83 Group
- Apparent magnitude (V): 9.3

Characteristics
- Type: SB(s)cd?edge
- Mass: 1.4+1.4 −0.7×10^{11} M_{☉}
- Size: 165,185 ly (50.67 kpc) (estimated)
- Apparent size (V): 20.0′ × 3.8′
- Notable features: Seyfert 2 galaxy

Other designations
- ESO 219- G 024, IRAS 13025-4911, LEDA 45279, PGC 45279, C 83

NGC 4945, also known as the Gold Dollar Galaxy or Tweezers Galaxy, is a widely-studied barred spiral galaxy in the constellation Centaurus, visible near the optical double star Xi Centauri. It is also known as Caldwell 83. The galaxy was discovered by Scottish astronomer James Dunlop in 1826. It is located at a distance of approximately 11.0 million light-years (3.36 Mpc) from the Milky Way. NGC 4945 hosts one of the closest active galactic nuclei to Earth and is classified as a Seyfert 2 galaxy.

NGC 4945 is one of the brightest galaxies of the Centaurus A/M83 Group, a large, nearby group of galaxies. The galaxy is the second brightest galaxy in the subgroup centered on Centaurus A.

== Observations ==
The morphological classification of NGC 4945 is SB(s)cd?edge, indicating this is a barred spiral galaxy (SB) with no inner ring structure (s) and possibly loosely-wound spiral arms (cd?). It is inclined at an angle of 90° to the plane of the sky, which means the galactic plane is being viewed edge-on. NGC 4945 is thought to be similar to the Milky Way Galaxy, although the maximum rotation rate of ~ 180 km/s is lower. It has a combined estimated mass of 1.4+1.4
−0.7×10^{11} M_{☉}. The stellar mass of the galaxy is 3.8×10^{10} M_{☉}, or 38 billion times the mass of the Sun.

In 1964, this galaxy was classified as a radio source at the Parkes Observatory. The nucleus was obscured in the optical band but was found to be a quite prominent source of infrared emission. It is the third brightest galaxy in the IRAS point source catalogue, with most of the emission coming from the core. Most of the Galaxy shows a linear rotation curve, although the southwest region showed an infall suggestive of a bar.

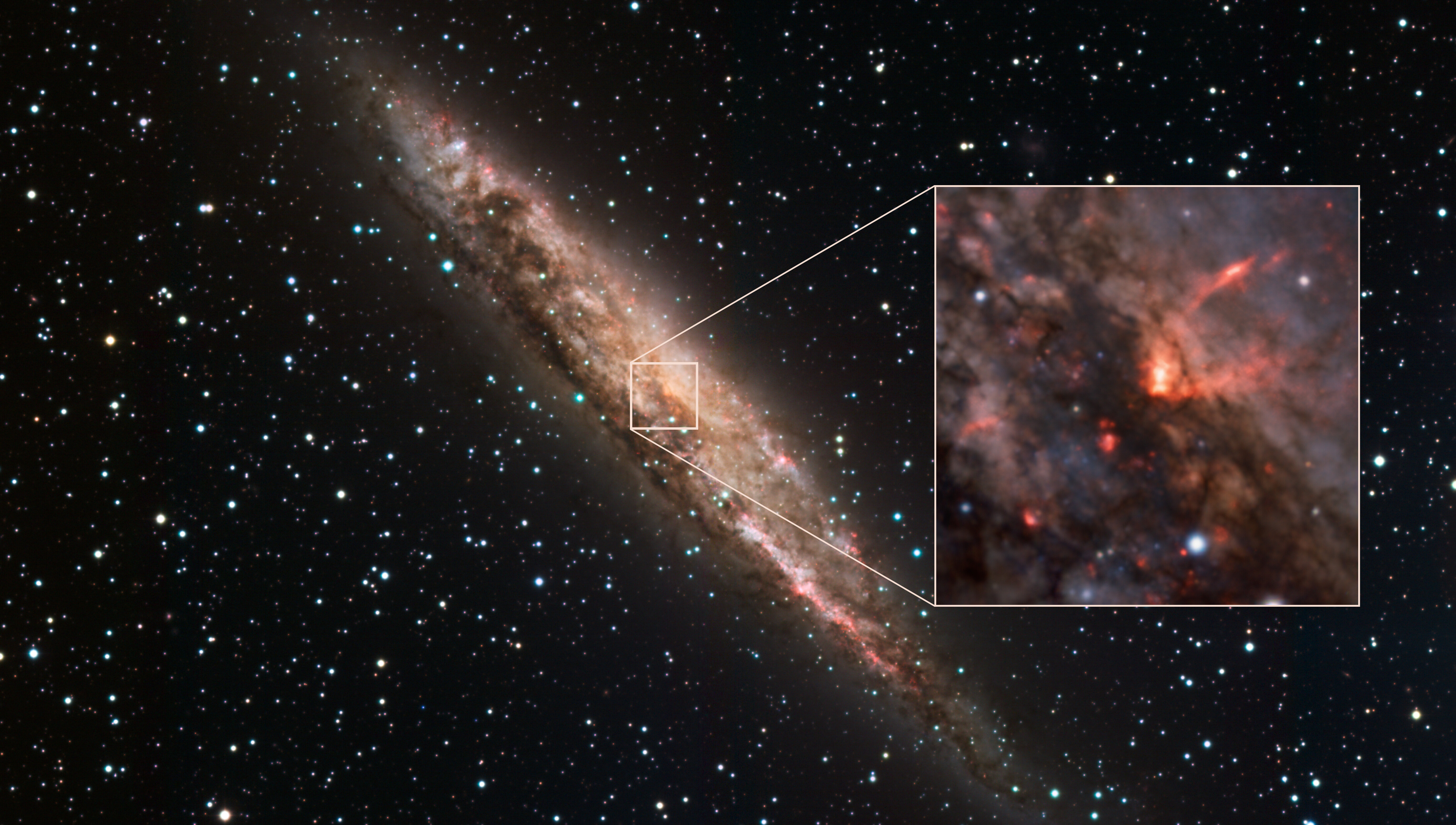
Detailed study of the supermassive black hole at the center of the galaxy, created with the help of the Very Large Telescope

In 1979, strong H_{2}O maser emission was detected from the central region. The properties of the nuclear region are suggestive of both a Seyfert type galaxy and an intense starburst region with a complex structure. The active nucleus is heavily obscured by dust. These dust lanes approach the nucleus, forming a tightly-wound structure in the inner 650 ly (200 pc). X-ray emission from the nuclear region indicates a Type 2 Seyfert galaxy. It is a strong emitter of hard X-rays, second only to NGC 4151, and likely harbors a supermassive black hole.

The starburst region is thought to be at least 5×10^{6} years old and contributes at least half of the luminosity coming from the core. It is concentrated in the central 330 ly (100 pc) and includes a conical cavity likely produced by supernovae-driven winds. This is taking place in a region of dense molecular clouds, forming a disk of dust and gas, along with many rich star clusters. A hot wind of gas from the nuclear region is carrying away 1.6 M_{☉} per year.

NGC 4945 was the first galaxy outside the Local Group to have stars resolved within its galactic halo. The halo mass is relatively large at ~ 3.5×10^{9} M_{☉} and it is metal-rich, both of which are typical for a Milky Way-like galaxy. It appears to be counter-rotating compared to the main disk, suggesting the halo has been accreted. The mass of the dominant satellite accreted into the halo is ~ 1.5×10^{9} M_{☉}, which is roughly the same as the Large Magellanic Cloud.

In October 2023, researchers using ALMA discovered an unknown object around 200 light years from the center of the galaxy. This object, named Punctum (Latin for "point" or "dot"), is a highly-polarized millimeter continuum source of synchrotron radiation. Punctum has a high non-visible luminosity, with archive data from Chandra reporting a 1×10^{37} erg s^{−1} X-ray luminosity in the 3–6 keV range and ATCA data reporting a radio luminosity of 5×10^{35} erg s^{−1} at 23 GHz. In a paper published in July 2025 about the object, the researchers said it most resembles a magnetar due to its polarization of 50%±14%, however the millimeter luminosity of said objects is usually much lower.

== Supernovae ==
Two supernovae have been observed in NGC 4945:

- SN 2005af (Type II-P, mag. 12.8) was discovered by CEAMIG/REA Supernovae Search on 8 February 2005, reaching a peak magnitude of 12.5 on 12 February.
- SN 2011ja (Type II-P, mag. 14) was discovered by Berto Monard on 18 December 2011, and achieved a maximum magnitude of 11.7 on 9 January 2012. The progenitor star for 2011ja may have been massive at 25 M_{☉} and located within a massive stellar cluster.

== In popular culture ==
"NGC 4945" is the title of a song by Brett Domino on the album Funk.

== Image gallery ==
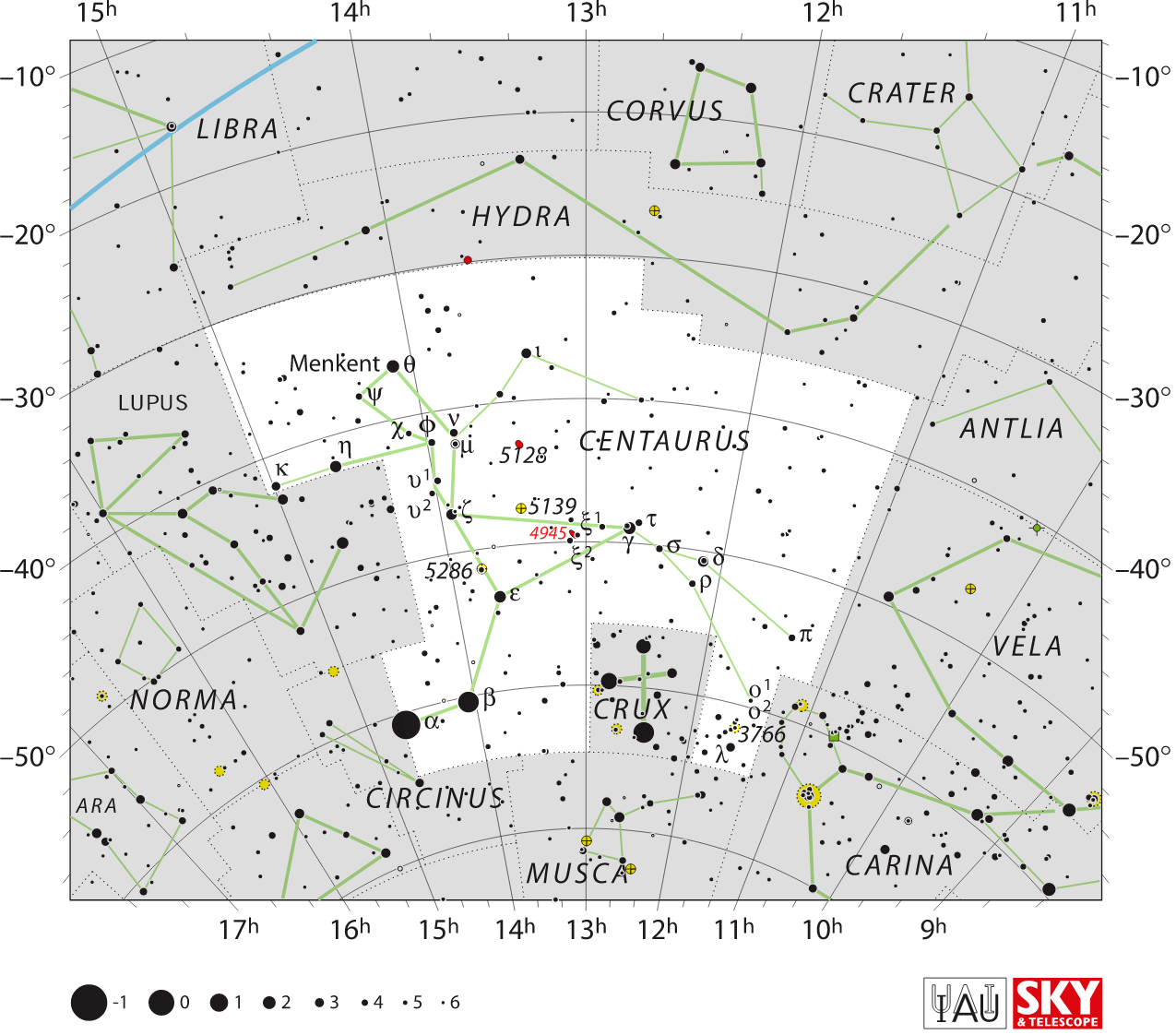
The location of NGC 4945 (labelled in red)
