= SN 1986G =

Supernova in the constellation Centaurus

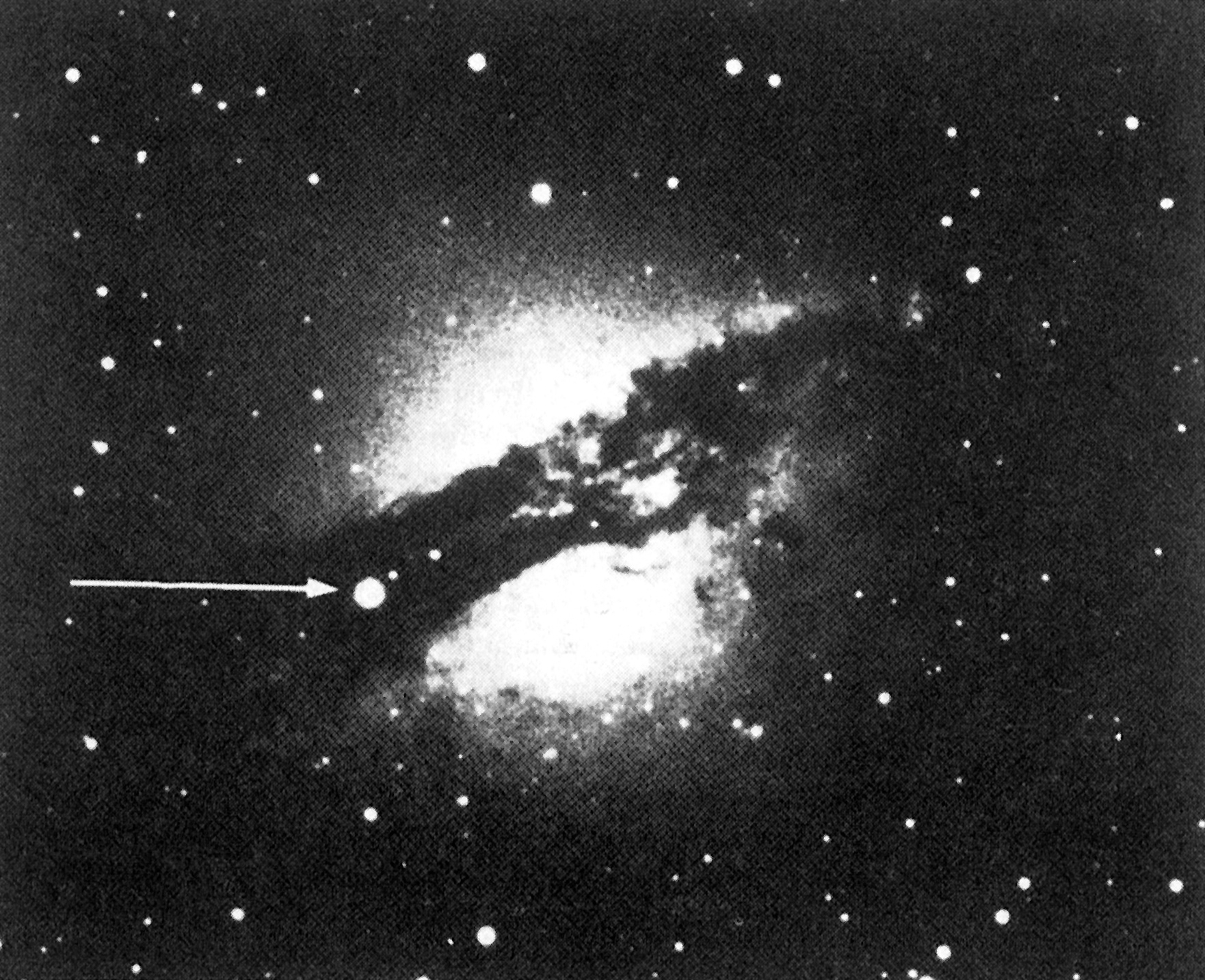
- SN 1986G imaged by the ESO 40-cm double astrograph (GPO) on La Silla
- Event type: Supernova
- Ia
- Discovered: May 3, 1986
- Constellation: Centaurus
- Right ascension: 13^{h} 25.6^{m} 40^{s}
- Declination: -43° 02' 16"
- Epoch: B1950.0
- Galactic coordinates: unknown
- Distance: about 15,000,000 light-years
- Remnant: unknown
- Host: Centaurus A (NGC 5128)
- Progenitor: unknown
- Progenitor type: F9/A0Ia
- Colour (B-V): unknown
- Peak apparent magnitude: +13.23
- Other designations: SN 1986G, AAVSO 1319-42, EV* N5128 V0018
- Related media on Commons

SN 1986G was a supernova that was observed on May 3, 1986 by Robert Evans. Its host galaxy, Centaurus A, is about 15 million light-years away in the constellation Centaurus. Since Centaurus A is about 15 million light-years away from us, this supernova happened 15 million years ago.

== See also ==
- Centaurus A
