= NGC 5206 =

Dwarf elliptical galaxy

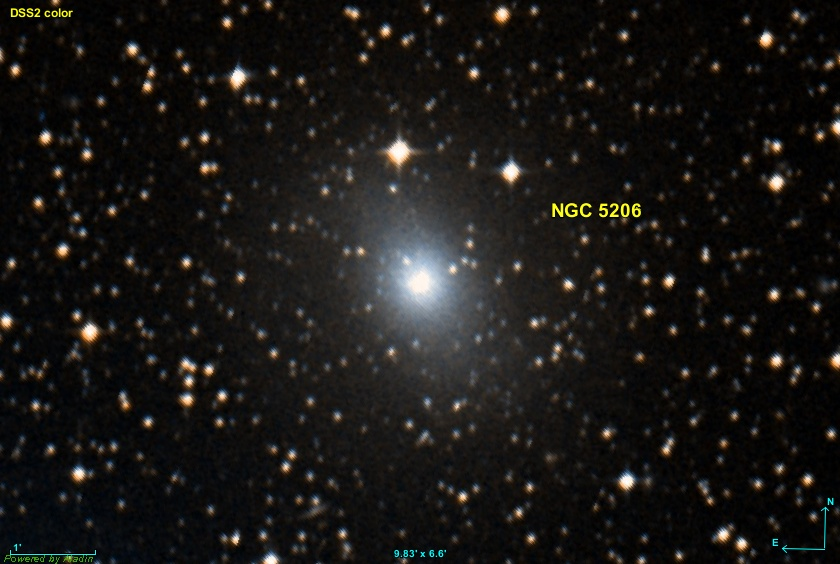
- NGC 5206 from Strasbourg Astronomical Data Center and DSS (Digitized Sky Survey)

Observation data (J2000.0 epoch)
- Constellation: Centaurus
- Right ascension: 13h 35m 17s
- Declination: −48° 16’ 52”
- Distance: 10.4 million ly
- Group or cluster: Centaurus A
- Apparent magnitude (B): 11.62
- magnitude (J): 9.39
- magnitude (H): 8.55
- magnitude (K): 8.49

Characteristics
- Type: Dwarf galaxy
- Mass: 2.6×10^{4} M_{☉}
- Notable features: Strongly nucleated

NGC 5206 is an early-type dwarf elliptical galaxy located 3.2 mpc from Earth in the constellation of Centaurus. It is a strongly nucleated galaxy with a mass of 2.6×10^{4} M_{☉}. It is around 2.91 billion years old.
