= NGC 5102 =

Lenticular galaxy in the M83 group of galaxies

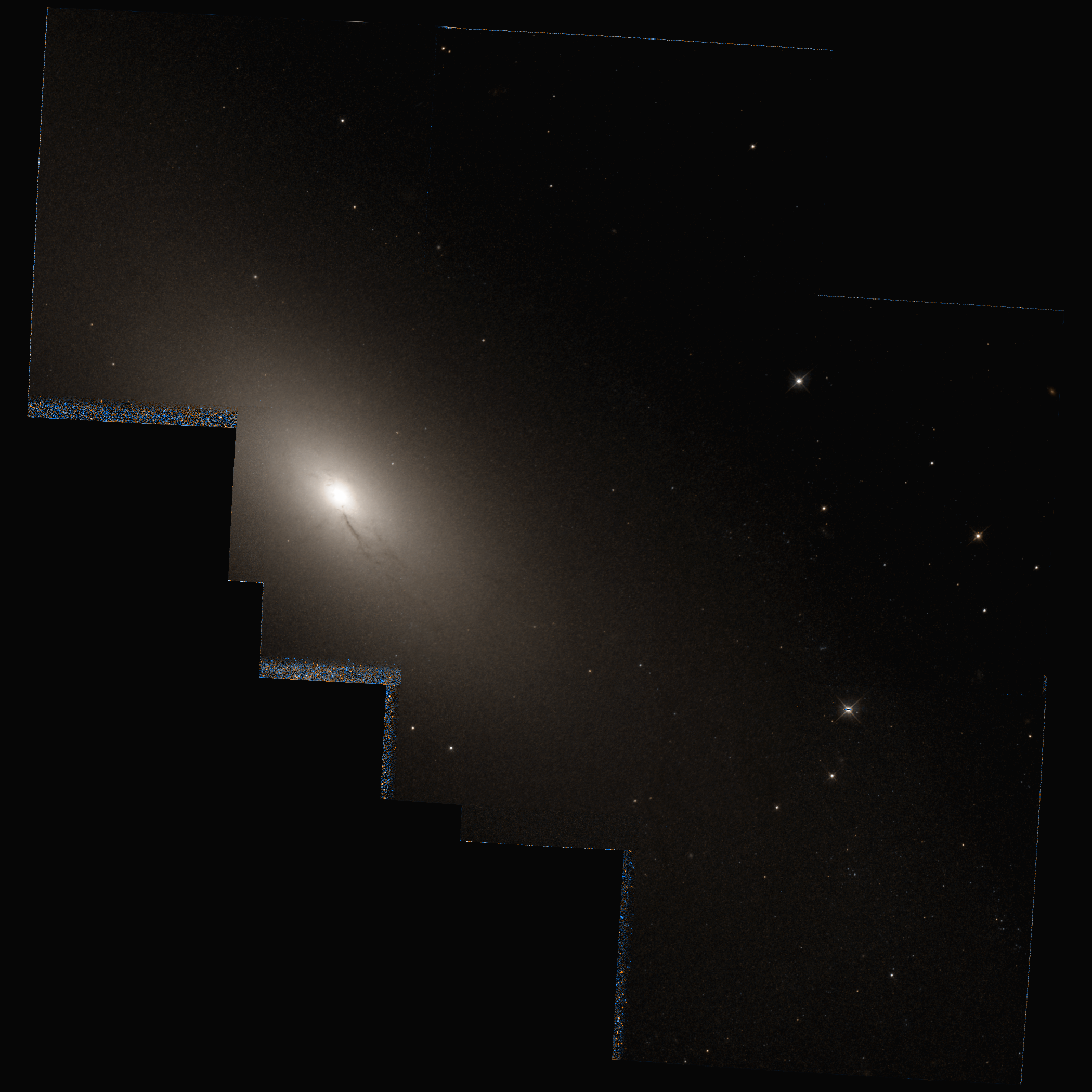
- NGC 5102 imaged by the Hubble Space Telescope

Observation data (J2000 epoch)
- Constellation: Centaurus
- Right ascension: 13^{h} 21^{m} 57.6070^{s}
- Declination: −36° 37′ 48.878″
- Redshift: 468 ± 2 km/s
- Distance: 12.1 ± 0.7 Mly (3.70 ± 0.23 Mpc)
- Apparent magnitude (V): 10.4

Characteristics
- Type: SA0^{−}
- Apparent size (V): 8.7′ × 2.8′

Other designations
- ESO 382- G 050, IRAS 13191-3622, 2MASX J13215765-3637487, MCG -06-29-031, PGC 46674

NGC 5102, also known as Iota's Ghost since it appears near Iota Centauri in the sky, is a lenticular galaxy in the Centaurus A/M83 Group of galaxies. It was discovered by British astronomer John Herschel on 21 April 1835.

== Distance measurements ==
At least two techniques have been used to measure the distance to NGC 5102. The surface brightness fluctuations distance measurement technique estimates distances to spiral galaxies based on the graininess of the appearance of their bulges. The distance measured to NGC 5102 using this technique is 13.0 ± 0.8 Mly (4.0 ± 0.2 Mpc). However, NGC 5102 is close enough that the tip of the red giant branch (TRGB) method may be used to estimate its distance. The estimated distance to NGC 5102 using this technique is 11.1 ± 1.3 Mly (3.40 ± 0.39 Mpc). Averaged together, these distance measurements give a distance estimate of 12.1 ± 0.7 Mly (3.70 ± 0.23 Mpc).

== Nova ==
Although no supernovae have yet been observed in NGC 5102, the galaxy is close enough for classical novae to be detected. The first confirmed nova in this galaxy was discovered by ATLAS at magnitude 18.464 on 5 June 2026, and designated AT 2026ofr.
