= SN 1895B =

Supernova in the constellation Centaurus

- Event type: Supernova, nova, variable star, suspected variable
- Type Ia
- Date: December 12, 1895
- Constellation: Centaurus
- Right ascension: 13^{h} 39^{m} 57.3^{s}
- Declination: −31° 38′ 06″
- Epoch: J2000.0
- Distance: 10.3 Mly (3.15 Mpc)
- Host: NGC 5253
- Peak apparent magnitude: +8.49±0.03
- Other designations: Z Cen, CD−31 10536, HD 118843, NOVA Cen 1895
- Preceded by: SN 1885A
- Followed by: SN 1937C

SN 1895B was a supernova event in the irregular dwarf galaxy NGC 5253, positioned 16″ east and 23″ north of the galactic center. It is among the closest known extragalactic supernova events. The supernova was discovered by Williamina Fleming on December 12, 1895 after noticing an unusual spectrum on a photographic plate taken July 18, 1895, and was initially given the variable star designation Z Centauri. The light curve is consistent with an event that began ~15 days before the discovery plate was taken, and this indicates the supernova reached a peak visual magnitude of up to 8.49±0.03.

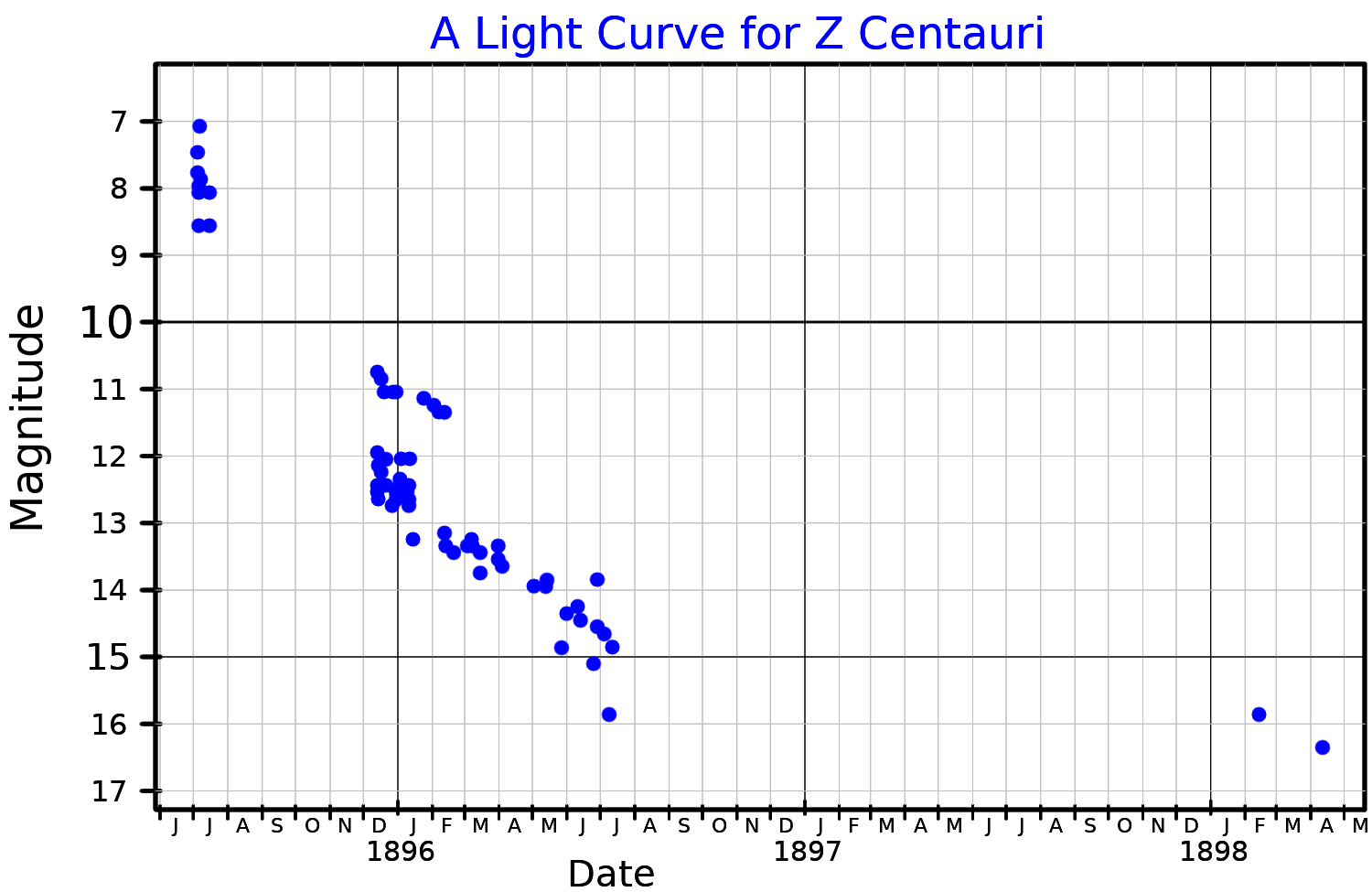
A light curve for Z Centauri, adapted from Leibundgut et al. (1991)

After the light faded, the remnant has remained undetected at any wavelength, including X-ray and radio. This suggests the expanding remnant is meeting a low density of surrounding interstellar material, which would be consistent with certain double white dwarf merger scenarios. The remnant is expected to reach peak radio emission around the year 2195, and it may become detectable at that time.
