= Centaurus A/M83 Group =

Group of galaxies in the constellations Centaurus, Hydra and Virgo

Centaurus A/M83 group
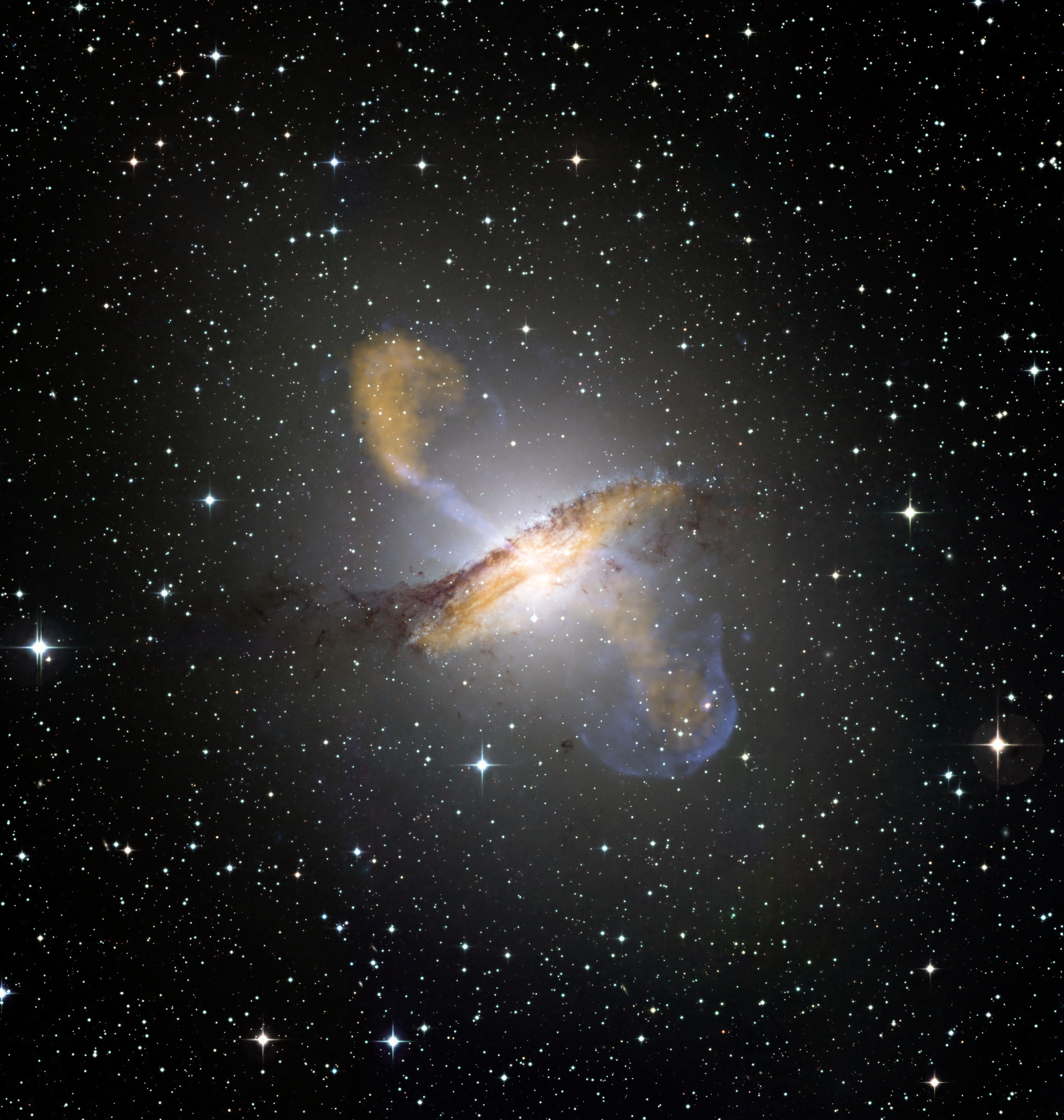
- The Centaurus A galaxy is the largest and most massive galaxy in the group

Observation data (Epoch )
- Constellation(s): Hydra, Centaurus, and Virgo
- Right ascension: 13^{h} 20^{m}
- Declination: −44° 58′
- Brightest member: Centaurus A
- Number of galaxies: 44

Other designations
- NGC 5128 Group, Centaurus A Group, LGG 344

The Centaurus A/M83 Group is a complex group of galaxies in the constellations Hydra, Centaurus, and Virgo. The group may be roughly divided into two subgroups. The Cen A Subgroup, at a distance of 11.9 Mly (3.66 Mpc), is centered on Centaurus A, a nearby radio galaxy. The M83 Subgroup, at a distance of 14.9 Mly (4.56 Mpc), is centered on the Messier 83 (M83), a face-on spiral galaxy.

By A.M. Garcia, Centaurus A subgroup is stated as LGG 344 and Messier 83 subgroup is known as LGG 355. LGG 344 has at least 8 members, while LGG 355 is written to have at least 4 members.

This group is sometimes identified as one group and sometimes identified as two groups. Hence, some references will refer to two objects named the Centaurus A Group and the M83 Group. However, the galaxies around Centaurus A and the galaxies around M83 are physically close to each other, and both subgroups appear not to be moving relative to each other.

The Centaurus A/M83 Group is part of the Virgo Supercluster, the local supercluster of which the Local Group is an outlying member. The group is part of the Coma–Sculptor Cloud.

== Members ==
=== Member identification ===
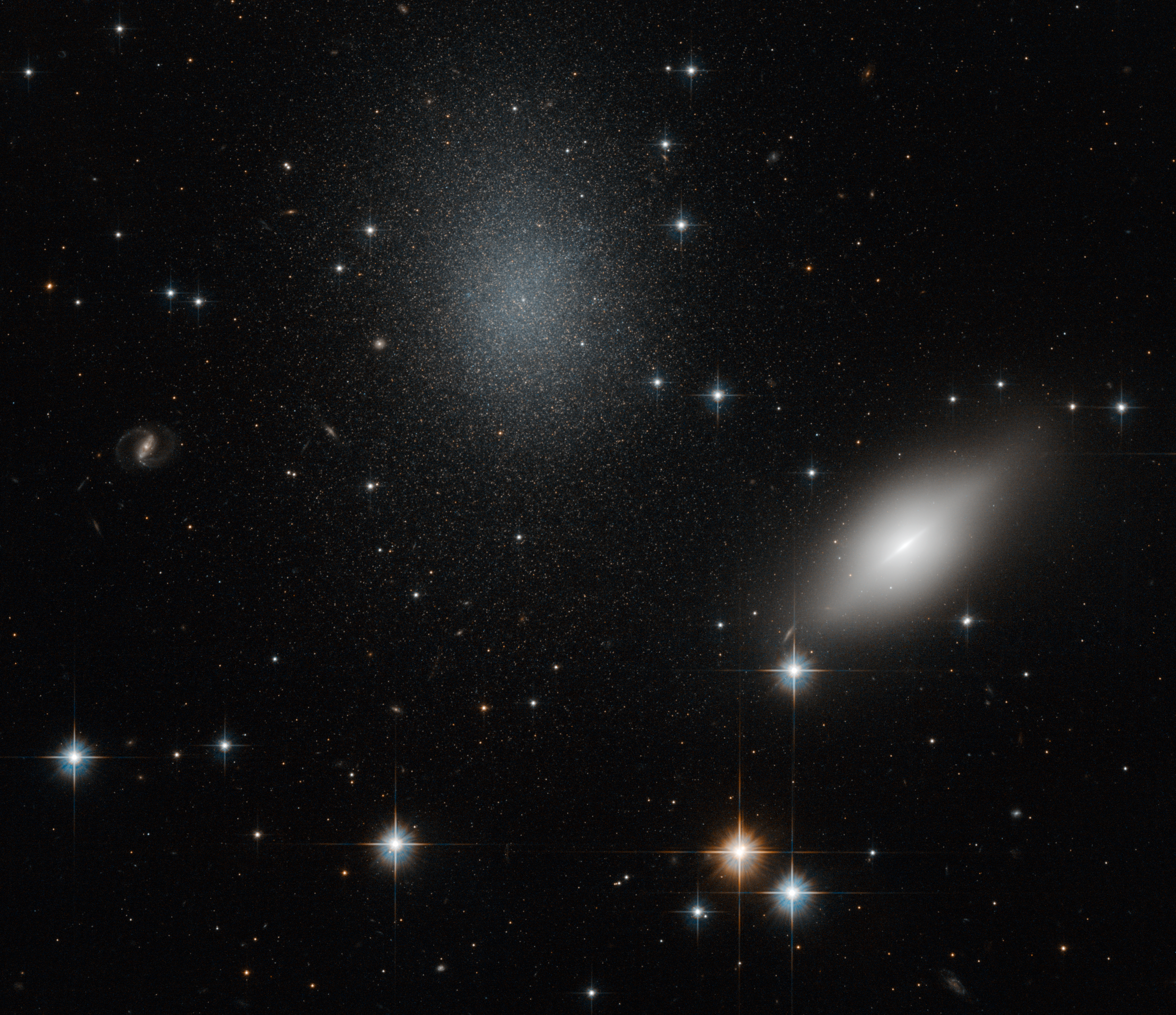
The galaxies NGC 5011B and NGC 5011C are imaged against a starry foreground.

The brightest group members were frequently identified in early galaxy group identification surveys. However, many of the dwarf galaxies in the group were only identified in more intensive studies. One of the first of these identified 145 faint objects on optical images from the UK Schmidt Telescope and followed these up in hydrogen line emission with the Parkes Radio Telescope and in the hydrogen-alpha spectral line with the Siding Spring 2.3 m Telescope. This identified 20 dwarf galaxies as members of the group. The HIPASS survey, which was a blind radio survey for hydrogen spectral line emission, found five uncatalogued galaxies in the group and also identified five previously-catalogued galaxies as members. An additional dwarf galaxy was identified as a group member in the HIDEEP survey, which was a more intensive radio survey for hydrogen emission within a smaller region of the sky. Several optical surveys later identified 20 more candidate objects to the group. In 2007, the Cen A group membership of NGC 5011C was established. While this galaxy is a well-known stellar system listed with a NGC number, its true identity remained hidden because of coordinate confusion and wrong redshifts in the literature. From 2015 to 2017 a full optical survey was conducted using the Dark Energy Camera, covering 550 square degrees in the sky and doubling the number of known dwarf galaxies in this group. Another deep but spatially limited survey around Centaurus A revealed numerous new dwarfs.

The dwarf spheroidal galaxies of the Centaurus A group have been studied and have been found to have old, metal-poor stellar populations similar to those in the Local Group, and follow a similar metallicity–luminosity relation. One dwarf galaxy, KK98 203 (LEDA 166167), has an extended ring of Hα emission.

=== Member list ===
The table below lists galaxies that have been identified as associated with the Centaurus A/M83 Group by I. D. Karachentsev and collaborators. Note that Karachentsev divides this group into two subgroups centered on Centaurus A and Messier 83.

Members of the Centaurus A Subgroup
Name	Type	R.A. (J2000)	Dec. (J2000)	Redshift (km/s)	Apparent Magnitude
Cen 7	Sph	13^{h} 11^{m} 13.8^{s}	−38° 53′ 56″		17.3
Cen N		13^{h} 48^{m} 09.1^{s}	−47° 33′ 54″		17.5
Centaurus A (NGC 5128)	S0 pec	13^{h} 25^{m} 27.6^{s}	−43° 01′ 09″	547 ± 5	7.8
Centaurus A-dE1	dSph	13^{h} 12^{m} 45.2^{s}	−41° 49′ 57″		19.3
Centaurus A-dE3	dE	13^{h} 46^{m} 00.8^{s}	−36° 19′ 44″		17.1
HIPASS J1337-39	Im	13^{h} 37^{m} 25.3^{s}	−39° 53′ 48″	492 ± 4	16.5
HIPASS J1348-37		13^{h} 48^{m} 47.0^{s}	−37° 58′ 29″	581 ± 8	16.9
HIPASS J1351-47		13^{h} 51^{m} 12.0^{s}	−46° 58′ 12.9″	529 ± 6	
KKs 51	E/Sph	12^{h} 44^{m} 21.5^{s}	−42° 56′ 23″		16.7
KKs 55	Sph	13^{h} 22^{m} 12.8^{s}	−42° 43′ 41″		18.5
KKs 57	Sph	13^{h} 41^{m} 38.1^{s}	−42° 34′ 55″		18.1
LEDA 166152	dI	13^{h} 05^{m} 02.1^{s}	−40° 04′ 58″	617 ± 4	16.3
LEDA 166167	dI/dSph	13^{h} 27^{m} 27.8^{s}	−45° 21′ 10″		18
LEDA 166172	dSph	13^{h} 43^{m} 36.0^{s}	−43° 46′ 11″		18.5
LEDA 166175	dSph	13^{h} 46^{m} 16.8^{s}	−45° 41′ 05″		19.2
LEDA 166179	dSph	13^{h} 48^{m} 46.4^{s}	−46° 59′ 46″		18
NGC 4945	SB(s)cd	13^{h} 05^{m} 27.5^{s}	−49° 28′ 06″	563 ± 3	9.3
NGC 5102	SA0	13^{h} 21^{m} 57.6^{s}	−36° 37′ 49″	468 ± 2	10.4
NGC 5206	SB(r)0	13^{h} 33^{m} 44.0^{s}	−48° 09′ 04″	571 ± 10	11.6
NGC 5237	I0	13^{h} 37^{m} 39.0^{s}	−42° 50′ 49″	361 ± 4	13.2
PGC 45104	IABm	13^{h} 03^{m} 33.6^{s}	−46° 35′ 06″		
PGC 45717	I0 pec	13^{h} 10^{m} 32.9^{s}	−46° 59′ 27.3″	1853 ± 32	13.3
PGC 45916	dE	13^{h} 13^{m} 09.1^{s}	−44° 53′ 24″	784 ± 31	14.1
PGC 46663	IBm	13^{h} 21^{m} 47.4^{s}	−45° 03′ 42″	741	16.1
PGC 46680	Im	13^{h} 22^{m} 02.0^{s}	−42° 32′ 07″		16.6
PGC 47171	IABm	13^{h} 27^{m} 37.4^{s}	−41° 28′ 50″	516 ± 3	12.9
PGC 48515	dE	13^{h} 42^{m} 05.6^{s}	−45° 12′ 18″		17.6
PGC 48738	IB(s)m	13^{h} 45^{m} 00.5^{s}	−41° 51′ 40″	545 ± 2	14.0
PGC 49615	dS0/Im	13^{h} 57^{m} 01.4^{s}	−35° 19′ 59″	561 ± 32	14.8

Members of the M83 Subgroup
Name	Type	R.A. (J2000)	Dec. (J2000)	Redshift (km/s)	Apparent Magnitude
AM 1321-304	dIm	13^{h} 24^{m} 36.2^{s}	−30° 58′ 19″	487 ± 1	16.7
Centaurus A-dE2	dE/Im	13^{h} 21^{m} 32.4^{s}	−31° 53′ 11″		17.6
Centaurus A-dE4	dSph	13^{h} 46^{m} 40.4^{s}	−29° 58′ 41″		19.
HIDEEP J1336-3321		13^{h} 36^{m} 56.1^{s}	−33° 21′ 23″	591	17.3
IC 4247	S	13^{h} 26^{m} 44.4^{s}	−30° 21′ 45″	274 ± 65	14.4
IC 4316	IBm pec	13^{h} 40^{m} 18.4^{s}	−28° 53′ 32″	674 ± 53	15.0
KK 208	dI	13^{h} 36^{m} 35.5^{s}	−29° 34′ 17″	381	14.3
LEDA 166163	dI	13^{h} 21^{m} 08.2^{s}	−31° 31′ 45″	571 ± 3	17.1
LEDA 166164	dSph	13^{h} 22^{m} 56.2^{s}	−33° 34′ 22″		17.6
M83	SAB(s)c	13^{h} 37^{m} 00.9^{s}	−29° 51′ 57″	513 ± 2	8.2
NGC 5253	Im pec	13^{h} 39^{m} 55.9^{s}	−31° 38′ 24″	407 ± 3	10.9
NGC 5264	IB(s)m	13^{h} 41^{m} 36.7^{s}	−29° 54′ 47″	478 ± 3	12.6
PGC 47885		13^{h} 35^{m} 08.1^{s}	−30° 07′ 03″	13848	15.8
PGC 48111	Im	13^{h} 37^{m} 20.0^{s}	−28° 02′ 42″	587 ± 3	15.0
UGCA 365	Im	13^{h} 36^{m} 31.1^{s}	−29° 14′ 06″	573 ± 1	15.4

Additionally, ESO 219-010, PGC 39032, and PGC 51659 are listed as possibly being members of the Centaurus A Subgroup, and ESO 381-018, NGC 5408, and PGC 43048 are listed as possibly being members of the M83 Subgroup. Although HIPASS J1337-39 is only listed as a possible member of the M83 Subgroup in the later list published by Karachentsev, later analyses indicate that this galaxy is within the subgroup. Saviane and Jerjen found that NGC 5011C has an optical redshift of 647 km/s and thus is a member of the Cen A group rather than of the distant Centaurus galaxy cluster as believed since 1983.
