= NGC 5264 =

Irregular galaxy in the M83 group of galaxies

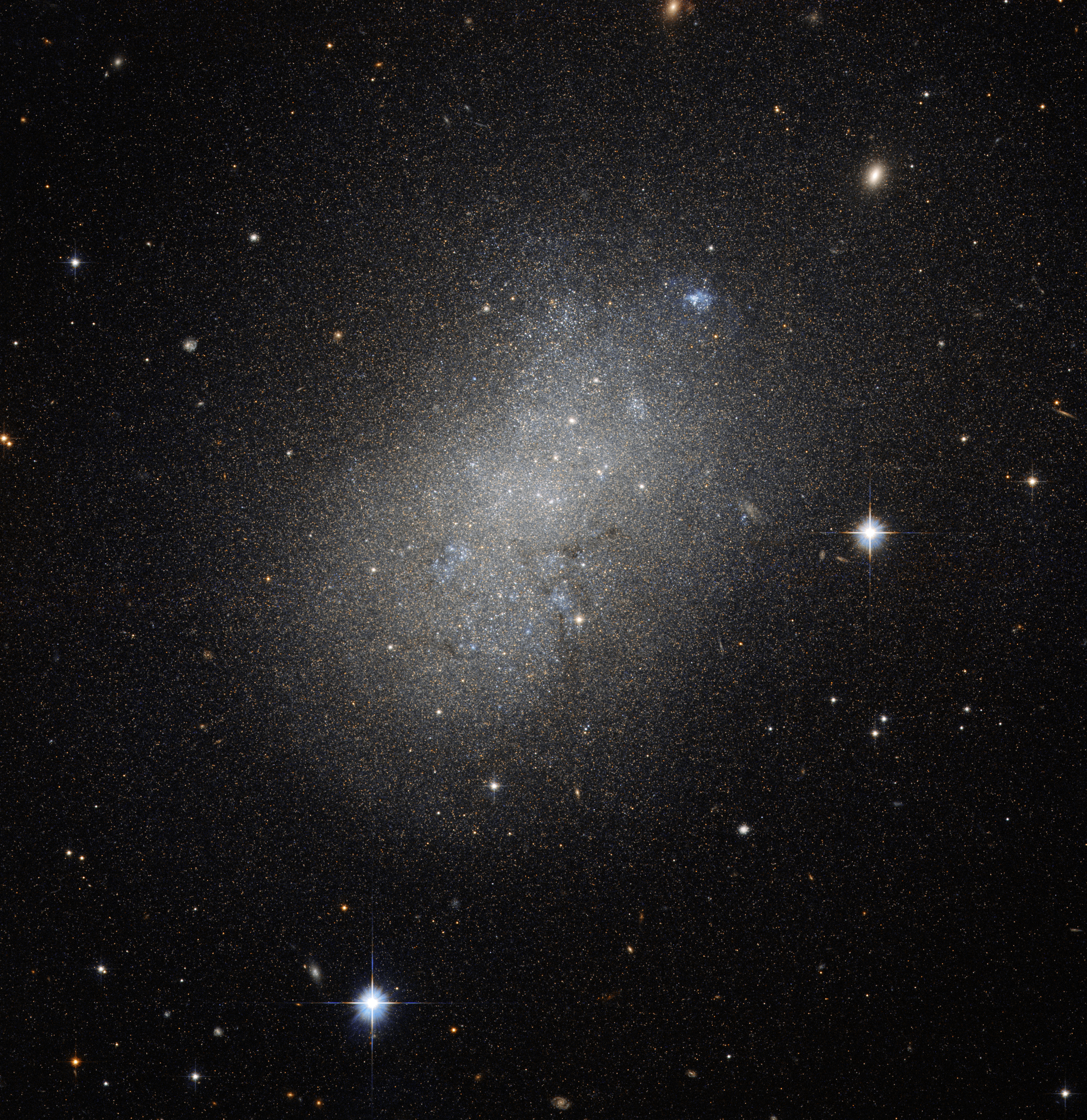
- NGC 5264, imaged by the Hubble Space Telescope

Observation data (J2000 epoch)
- Constellation: Hydra
- Right ascension: 13^{h} 41^{m} 36.683^{s}
- Declination: −29° 54′ 47.25″
- Redshift: 0.001594
- Heliocentric radial velocity: 478 km/s
- Distance: 14.82 ± 0.84 Mly (4.545 ± 0.258 Mpc)
- Group or cluster: Centaurus A/M83 Group (M83 subgroup)
- Apparent magnitude (V): 12.39
- Apparent magnitude (B): 12.96

Characteristics
- Type: IB(s)m
- Number of stars: 1 billion
- Size: 11000 × 6500 ly (3300 × 2000 pc)
- Apparent size (V): 2.5′ × 1.5′

Other designations
- DDO 242, UGCA 370, MCG-05-32-066, PGC 48467

NGC 5264, also known as DDO 242, is an irregular galaxy in the constellation Hydra. It is part of the M83 subgroup of the Centaurus A/M83 Group, located some 15 million light years (4.5 megaparsecs) away. The galaxy was discovered on 30 March 1835 by John Herschel, and it was described as "very faint, pretty large, round, very little brighter middle" by John Louis Emil Dreyer, the compiler of the New General Catalogue.

NGC 5264 was imaged by the Hubble Space Telescope in 2016. The galaxy is relatively small: it is a dwarf galaxy, a type of galaxy much smaller than normal spiral galaxies and elliptical galaxies. In fact, it is only 11000 light years (3300 parsecs) wide at its widest; our own galaxy, Milky Way, in comparison, is about ten times larger. Dwarf galaxies like these usually have about a billion stars. NGC 5264 also is relatively blue-coloured; this is from it interacting with other galaxies, supplying it with gas for star formation.
