= Centaurus A =

Radio galaxy in the constellation Centaurus

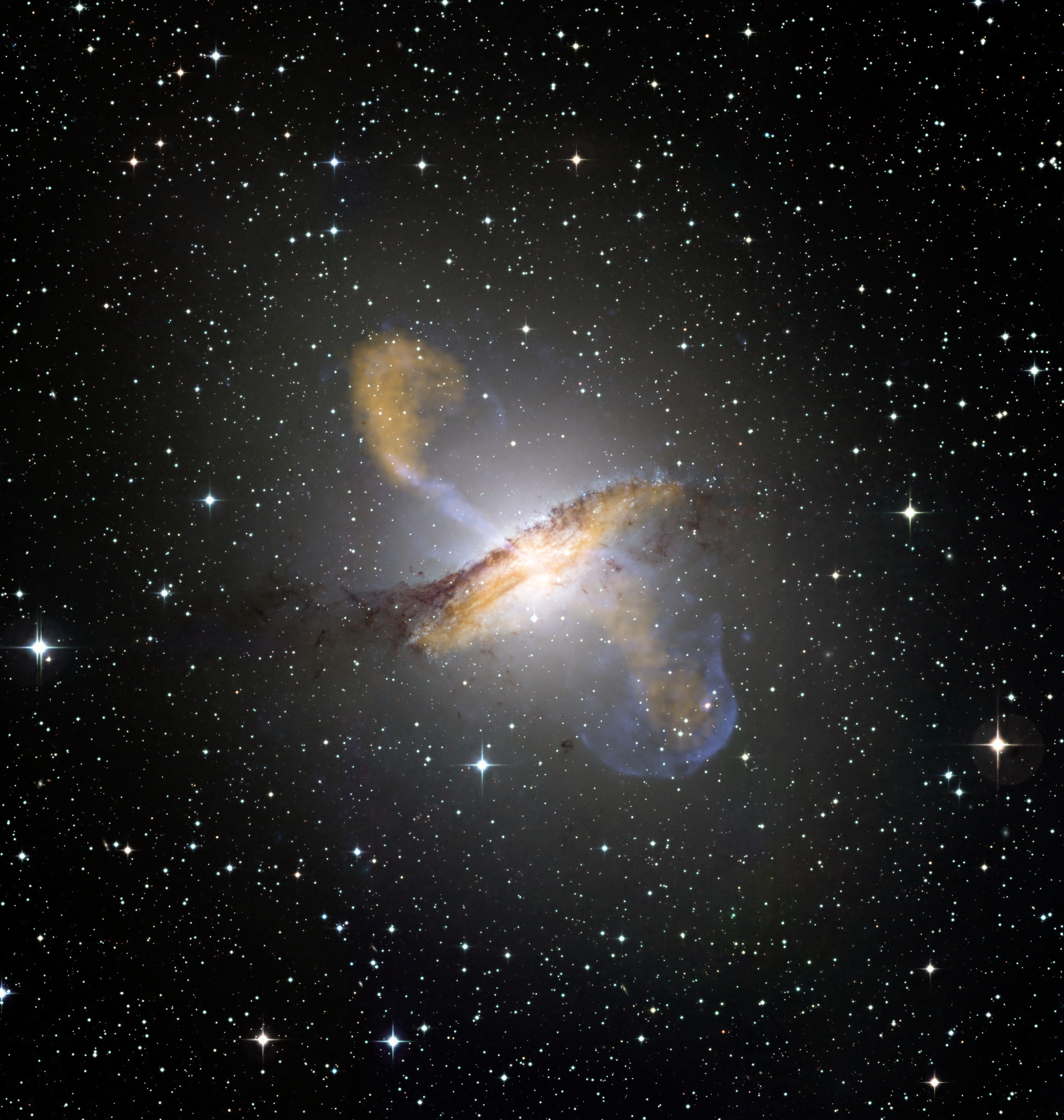
- A composite image of Centaurus A in submillimetre wavelengths (orange), visible light, and X-rays (blue)

Observation data (J2000 epoch)
- Constellation: Centaurus
- Right ascension: 13^{h} 25^{m} 27.6150^{s}
- Declination: −43° 01′ 08.806″
- Redshift: 0.001825±0.0000167
- Heliocentric radial velocity: 547 ± 5 km/s
- Distance: 11–13 Mly (3–5 Mpc)
- Apparent magnitude (V): 6.84

Characteristics
- Type: S0 pec or Ep
- Size: ~123,100 ly (37.74 kpc) (estimated)
- Apparent size (V): 25.7′ × 20.0′
- Notable features: Closest radio galaxy; closest BL Lacertae object; unusual dust lane

Other designations
- 4U 1322–42, ESO 270-IG 009, IRAS 13225-4245, NGC 5128, Arp 153, MCG -07-28-001, PGC 46957, C 77

Centaurus A (also known as NGC 5128 or Caldwell 77) is a galaxy in the constellation of Centaurus. It was discovered in 1826 by Scottish astronomer James Dunlop from his home in Parramatta, in New South Wales, Australia. There is considerable debate in the literature regarding the galaxy's fundamental properties such as its Hubble type (lenticular galaxy or a giant elliptical galaxy) and distance (11–13 million light-years). It is the closest radio galaxy to Earth, as well as the closest BL Lac object, so its active galactic nucleus has been extensively studied by professional astronomers. The galaxy is also the fifth-brightest in the sky, making it an ideal amateur astronomy target. It is only visible from the southern hemisphere and low northern latitudes.

The center of the galaxy contains a supermassive black hole with a mass of 55 million solar masses, which ejects a relativistic jet that is responsible for emissions in the X-ray and radio wavelengths. By taking radio observations of the jet separated by a decade, astronomers have determined that the inner parts of the jet are moving at about half of the speed of light. X-rays are produced farther out as the jet collides with surrounding gases, resulting in the creation of highly energetic particles. The X-ray jets of Centaurus A are thousands of light-years long, while the radio jets are over a million light-years long.

It is also one of the nearest large starburst galaxies, of which a galactic collision is suspected to be responsible for an intense burst of star formation. Models have suggested that Centaurus A was a large elliptical galaxy that collided with a smaller spiral galaxy, with which it will eventually merge. For that reason, the galaxy has been of particular interest to astronomers for years. While collisions of spiral galaxies are relatively common, the effects of a collision between an elliptical and a spiral galaxy are not fully understood.

== Observational history ==
NGC 5128 was discovered on 29 April 1826 by James Dunlop during a survey at the Parramatta Observatory.

In 1847 John Herschel described the galaxy as "two semi-ovals of elliptically formed nebula appearing to be cut asunder and separated by a broad obscure band parallel to the larger axis of the nebula, in the midst of which a faint streak of light parallel to the sides of the cut appears."

In 1949 John Gatenby Bolton, Bruce Slee and Gordon Stanley localized NGC 5128 as one of the first extragalactic radio sources. Five years later, Walter Baade and Rudolph Minkowski suggested that the peculiar structure is the result of a merge event of a giant elliptical galaxy and a small spiral galaxy. The first detection of X-ray emissions, using a sounding rocket, was performed in 1970. In 1975–76 gamma-ray emissions from Centaurus A were observed through the atmospheric Cherenkov technique.

The Einstein Observatory detected an X-ray jet emanating from the nucleus in 1979. Ten years later, young blue stars were found along the central dust band with the Hubble Space Telescope.

The Chandra X-ray Observatory identified in 1999 more than 200 new point sources. Another space telescope, the Spitzer Space Telescope, found a parallelogram-shaped structure of dust in near infrared images of Centaurus A in 2006.

Evidence of gamma emissions with very high energy (more than 100 GeV) was detected by the H.E.S.S Observatory in Namibia in 2009.

The following year, Centaurus A was identified as a source of cosmic rays of highest energies, after years of observations by Pierre Auger Observatory. In 2016 a review of data from Chandra and XMM-Newton, unusual high flares of energy were found in NGC 5128 and the galaxy NGC 4636. Jimmy Irwin of University of Alabama hypothesized the discovery as potentially a black hole in a yet unknown process or an intermediate-mass black hole.

== Morphology ==
Centaurus A may be described as having a peculiar morphology. As seen from Earth, the galaxy looks like a lenticular or elliptical galaxy with a superimposed dust lane. The peculiarity of this galaxy was first identified in 1847 by John Herschel, and the galaxy was included in Halton Arp's Atlas of Peculiar Galaxies (published in 1966) as one of the best examples of a "disturbed" galaxy with dust absorption. The galaxy's strange morphology is generally recognized as the result of a merger between two smaller galaxies.

Zoom movie of the galaxy Centaurus A, showing different aspects of the galaxy in several wavelengths.

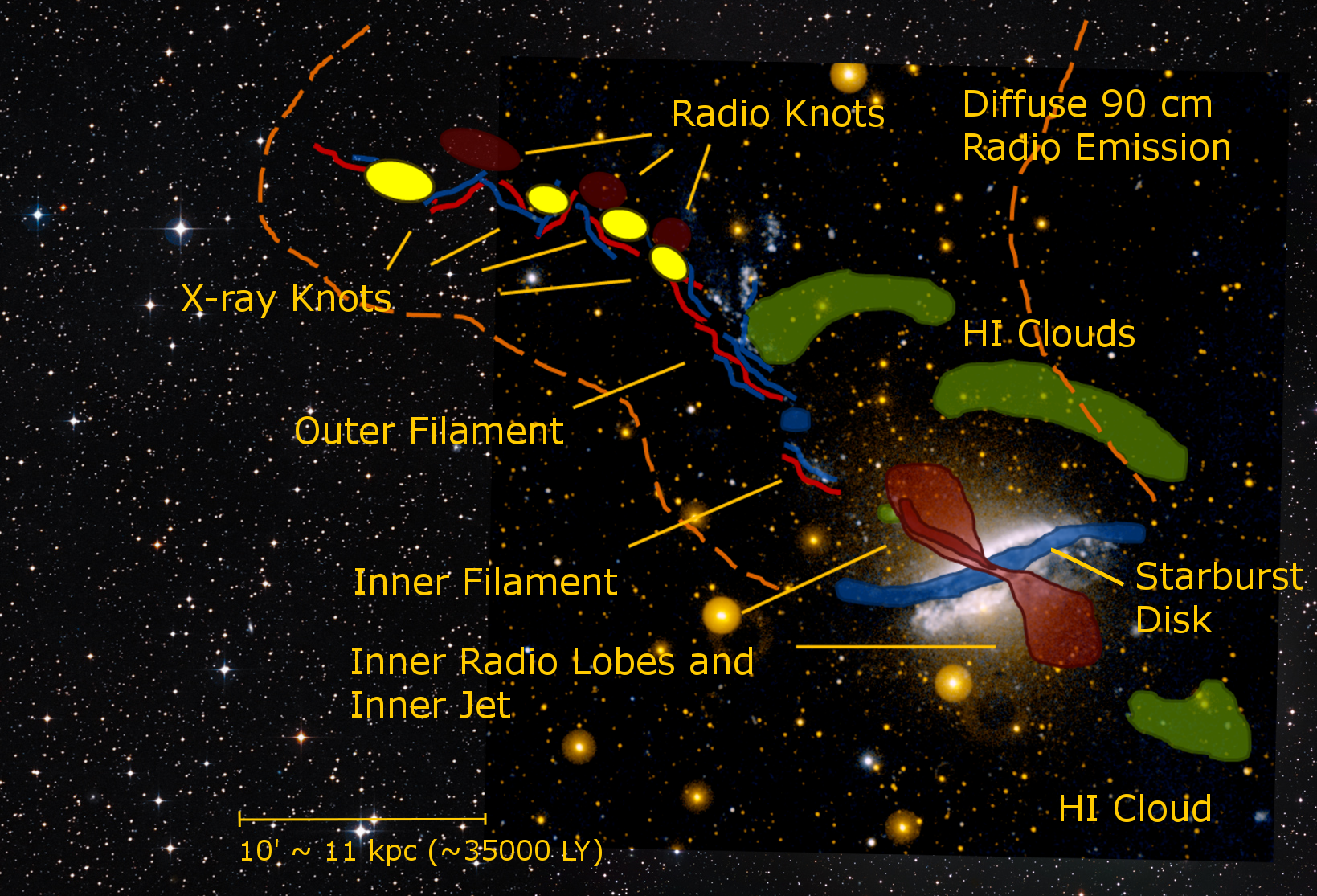
Schematic diagram of the components of the Centaurus A galaxy

The bulge of this galaxy is composed mainly of evolved red stars. The dusty disk, however, has been the site of more recent star formation; over 100 star formation regions have been identified in the disk.

== Novae and supernovae ==
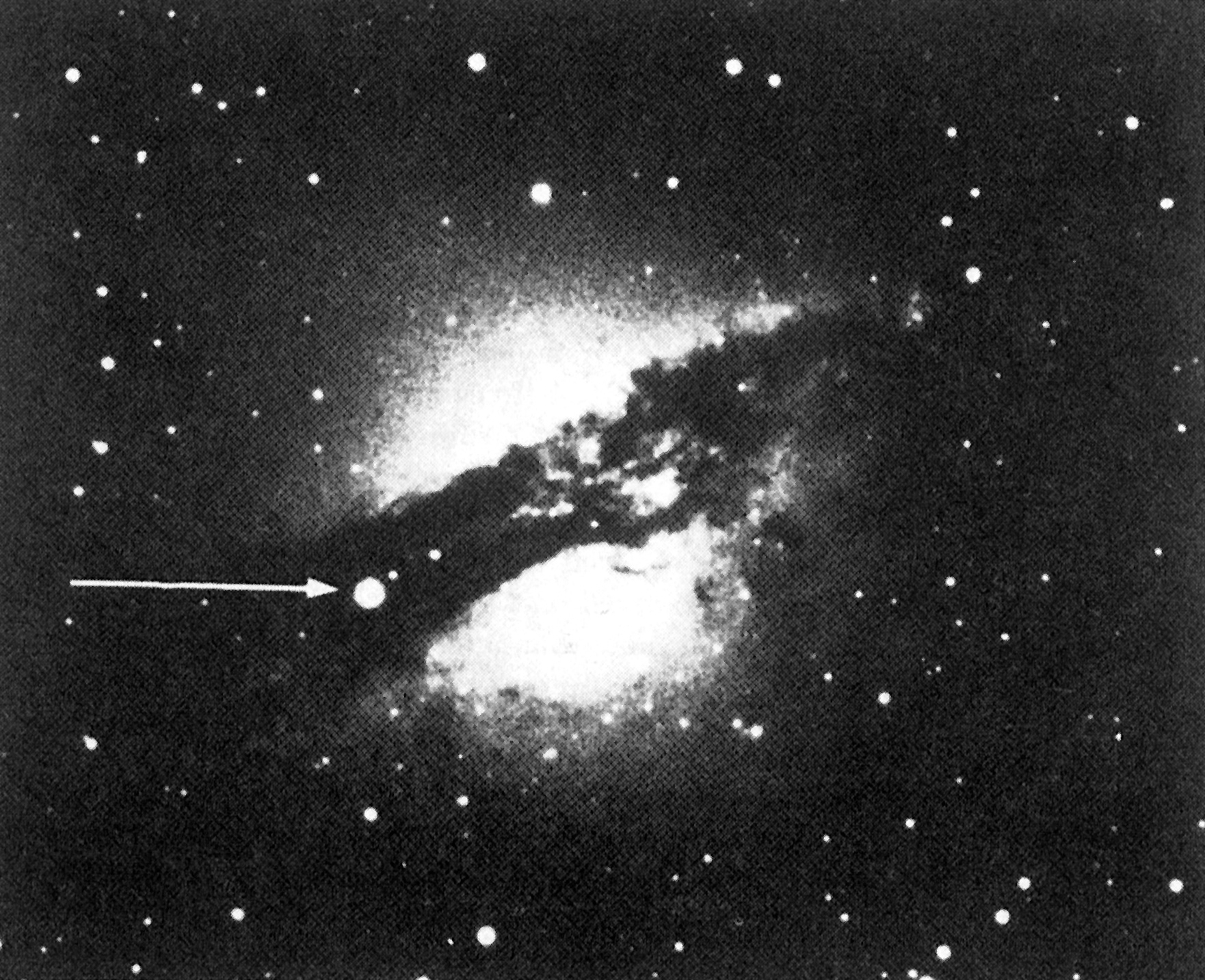
SN 1986G imaged with the ESO 40-cm double astrograph on La Silla

Two supernovae have been detected in Centaurus A.

The first supernova, named SN 1986G, was discovered within the dark dust lane of the galaxy by Robert Evans on 3 May 1986. It was later identified as a Type Ia supernova, which forms when a white dwarf's mass grows large enough to ignite carbon fusion in its center, touching off a runaway thermonuclear reaction, as may happen when a white dwarf in a binary star system strips gas away from the other star. SN 1986G was used to demonstrate that the spectra of Type Ia supernovae are not all identical, and that Type Ia supernovae may differ in the way that they change in brightness over time.

The second supernova, designated SN 2016adj, was discovered by Backyard Observatory Supernova Search in February 2016 and was initially classified as a Type II supernova based on its H-alpha emission line. A subsequent classification found the spectrum best resembled the Type Ib core-collapse supernova 1999dn. (See Type Ib and Ic supernovae).

In addition to these supernovae, a luminous red nova, designated AT 2020nqq (Type ILRT, mag. 17.8), was discovered on 27 June 2020.

Centaurus A is close enough that classical novae can also be detected:

- AT 2024aeql (type nova, mag. 18.47) was discovered by BlackGEM on 23 December 2024.
- AT 2025nok (type nova, mag. 18.706) was discovered by ATLAS on 14 June 2025.

== Distance ==
Distance estimates to Centaurus A established since the 1980s typically range between 3–5 Mpc. Classical Cepheids discovered in the heavily obscured dust lane of Centaurus A yield a distance between ~3–3.5 Mpc, depending on the nature of the extinction law adopted and other considerations. Mira variables and Type II Cepheids were also discovered in Centaurus A, the latter being rarely detected beyond the Local Group. The distance to Centaurus A established from several indicators such as Mira variables and planetary nebulae favour a more distant value of ~3.8 Mpc.

== Nearby galaxies and galaxy group information ==
Centaurus A is at the center of one of two subgroups within the Centaurus A/M83 Group, a nearby group of galaxies. Messier 83 (the Southern Pinwheel Galaxy) is at the center of the other subgroup. These two groups are sometimes identified as one group and sometimes identified as two groups. However, the galaxies around Centaurus A and the galaxies around M83 are physically close to each other, and both subgroups appear not to be moving relative to each other. The Centaurus A/M83 Group is located in the Virgo Supercluster.

In addition to dwarf galaxies, Centaurus A, like most galaxies, has a population of globular clusters. Some objects that appear to be globular clusters are hypothesized to be the tidally stripped cores of former galaxies. The most extreme example is the object VHH81-01, whose central black hole is estimated to be around 8×10^{5} M_{☉}.

== Observations ==
=== Radio waves ===
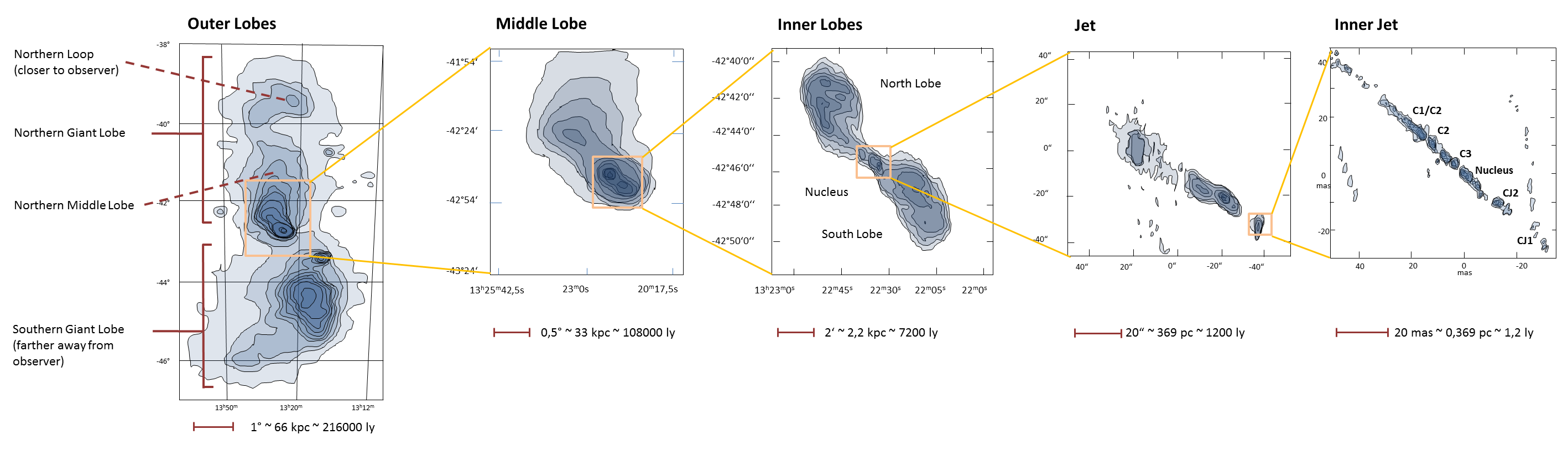
Overview over the radio structure of Centaurus A. The whole radio emitting region extends about 1.8 million light years (about 8° degrees in the sky). Through observations with the VLBI technique structures of the jet and the core smaller than a light year could be resolved (corresponding to a resolution of 0.68 × 0.41 milli-arcseconds.)

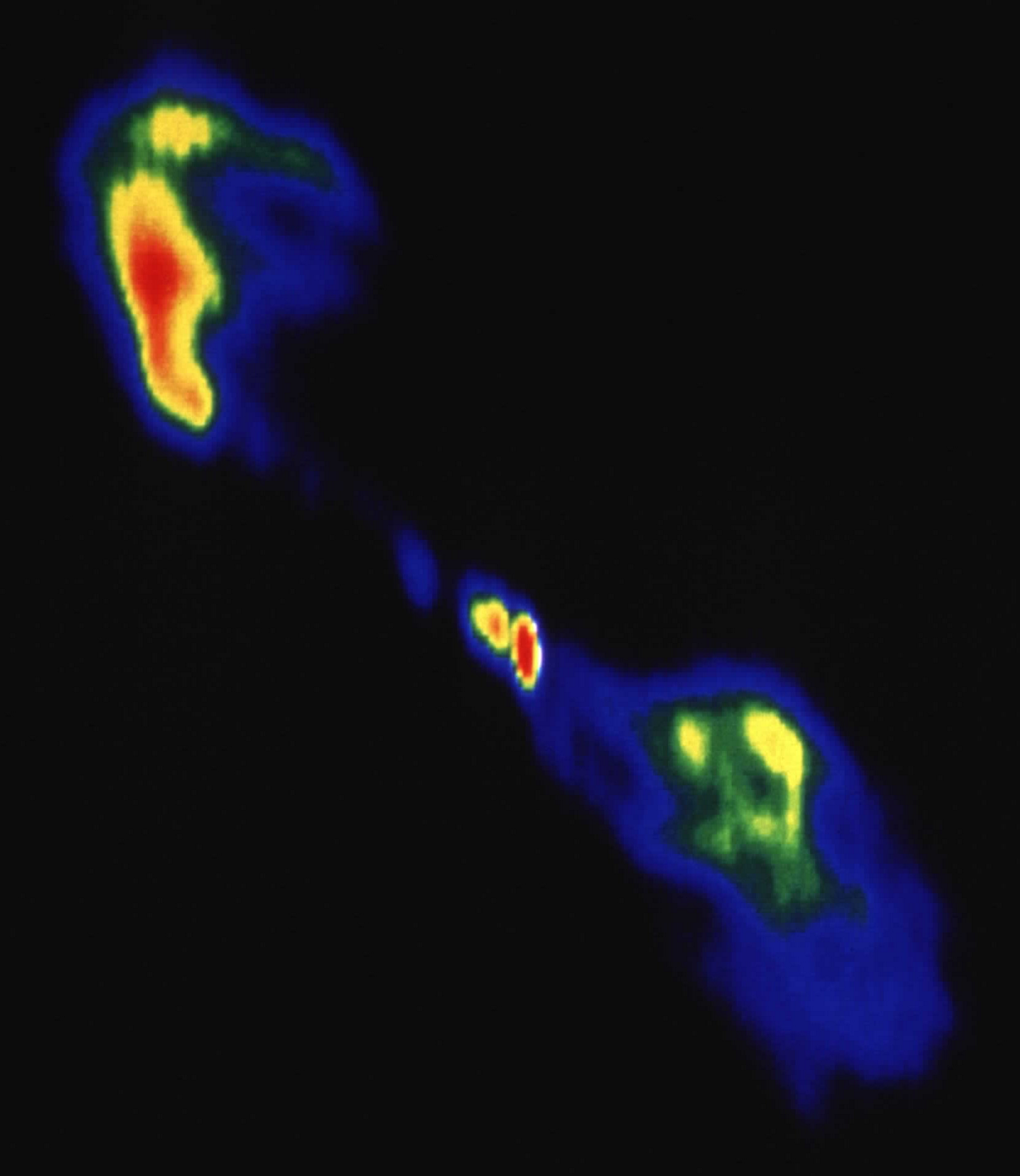
This view of the jets of Centaurus A was created using radio wave observations at a wavelength of 20 cm with the Very Large Array (VLA). The position of the radio jet, along with the knots within it, closely matches the structures observed in the X-ray jet. This region of the jet is known as the "Inner Lobe".

In July 2021 the Event Horizon Telescope released a resolved image of Centaurus A showing the jet coming from the black hole at its center.

== Visibility ==
Centaurus A is located approximately 4° north of Omega Centauri (a globular cluster visible with the naked eye). Because the galaxy has a high surface brightness and relatively large angular size, it is an ideal target for amateur astronomy observations. The bright central bulge and dark dust lane are visible even in finderscopes and large binoculars, and additional structure may be seen in larger telescopes. Claims have been made that Centaurus A is visible to the naked eye under exceptionally good conditions.

== Gallery ==
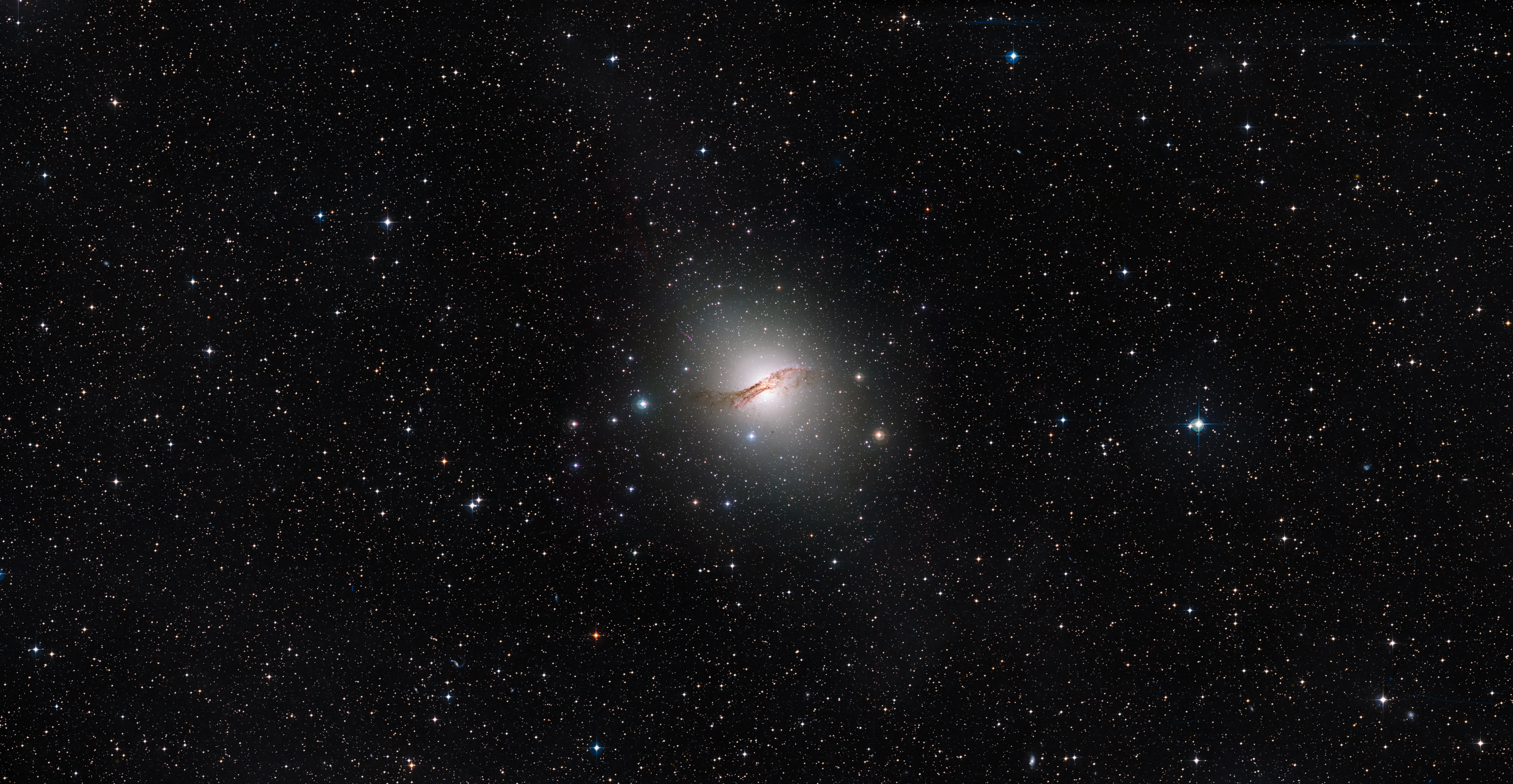
Wide field view of Centaurus A showing its extended halo of stars

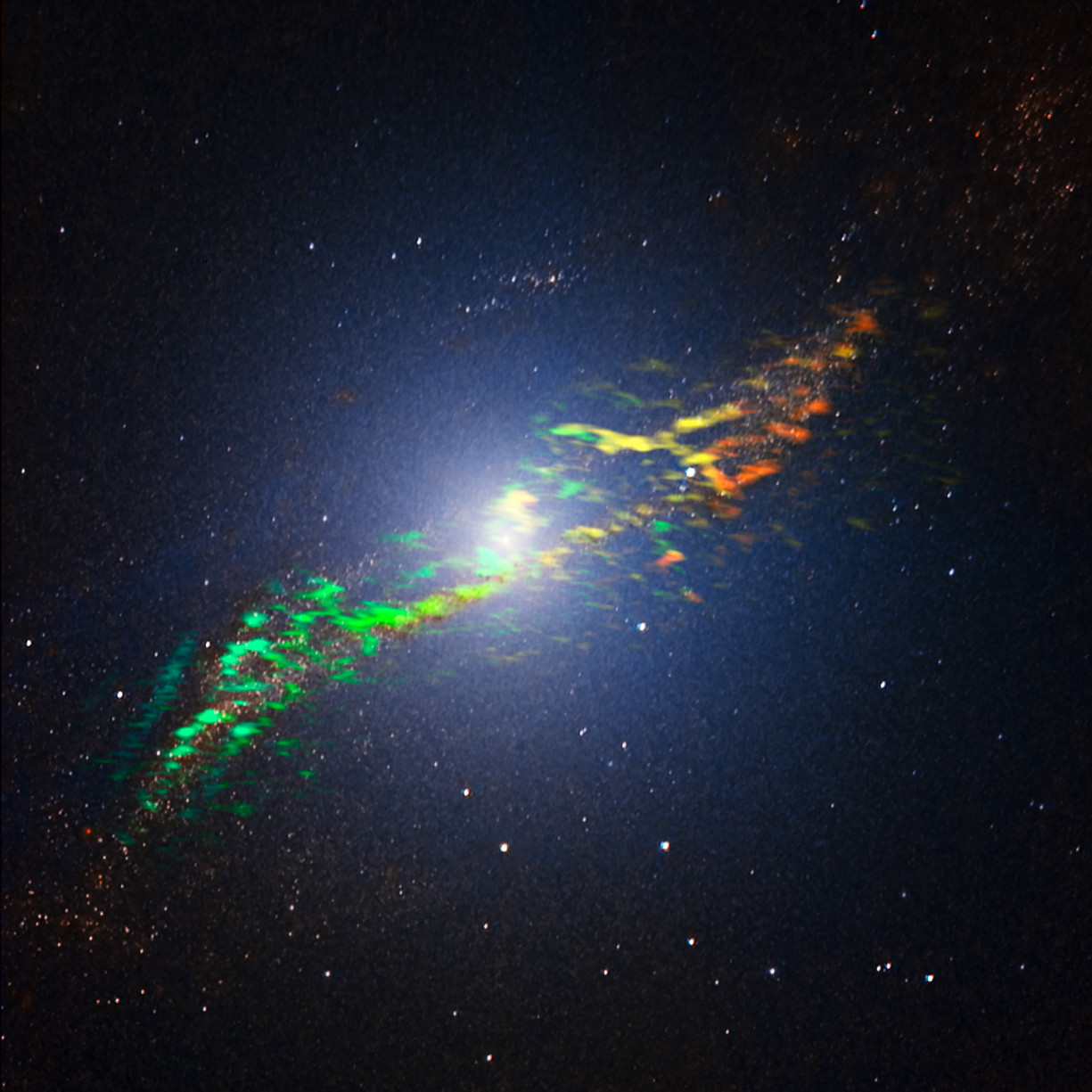
The radio galaxy Centaurus A, as seen by ALMA

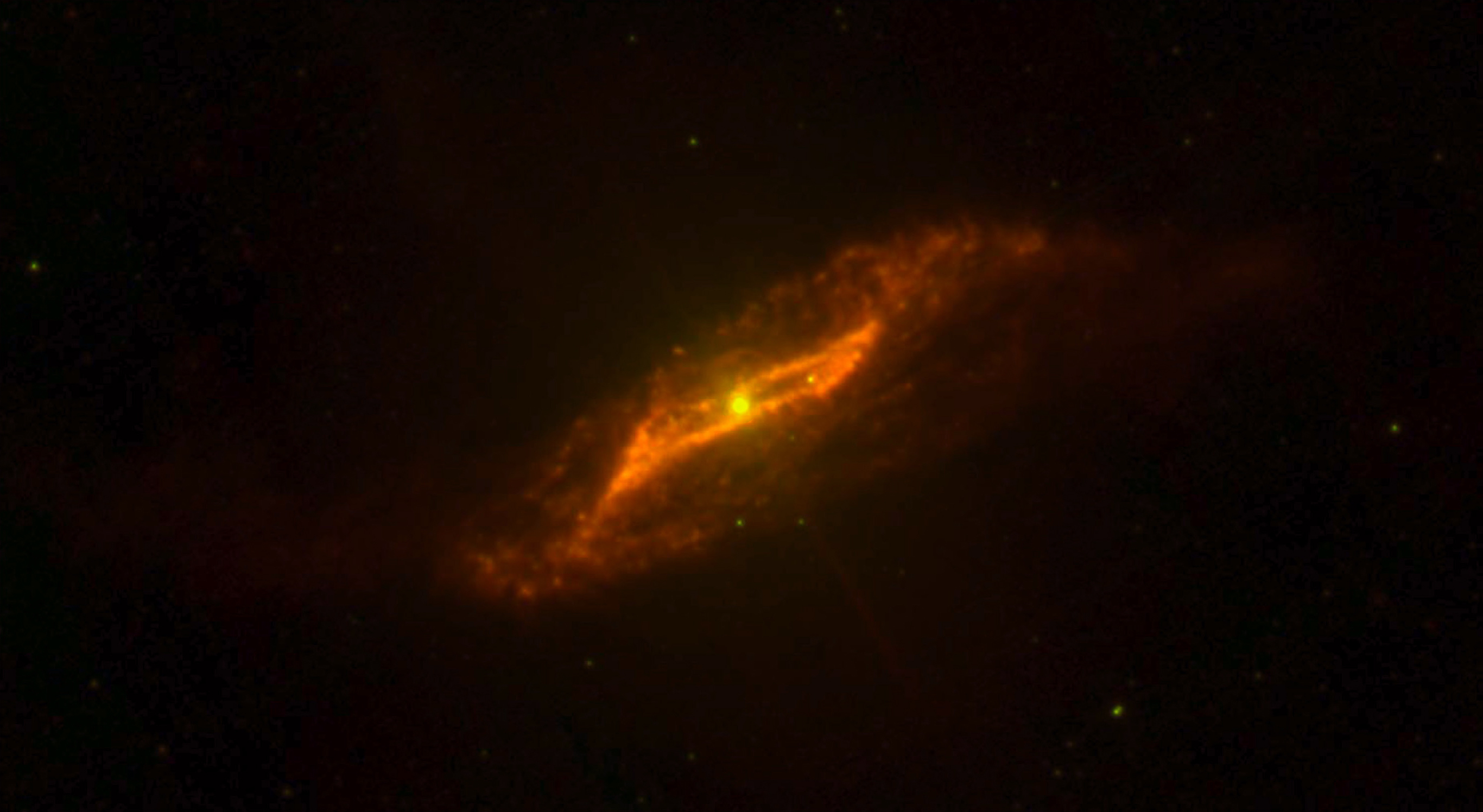
The heavily obscured inner (barred?) spiral disk at 24 μm as shown by the Spitzer IR telescope

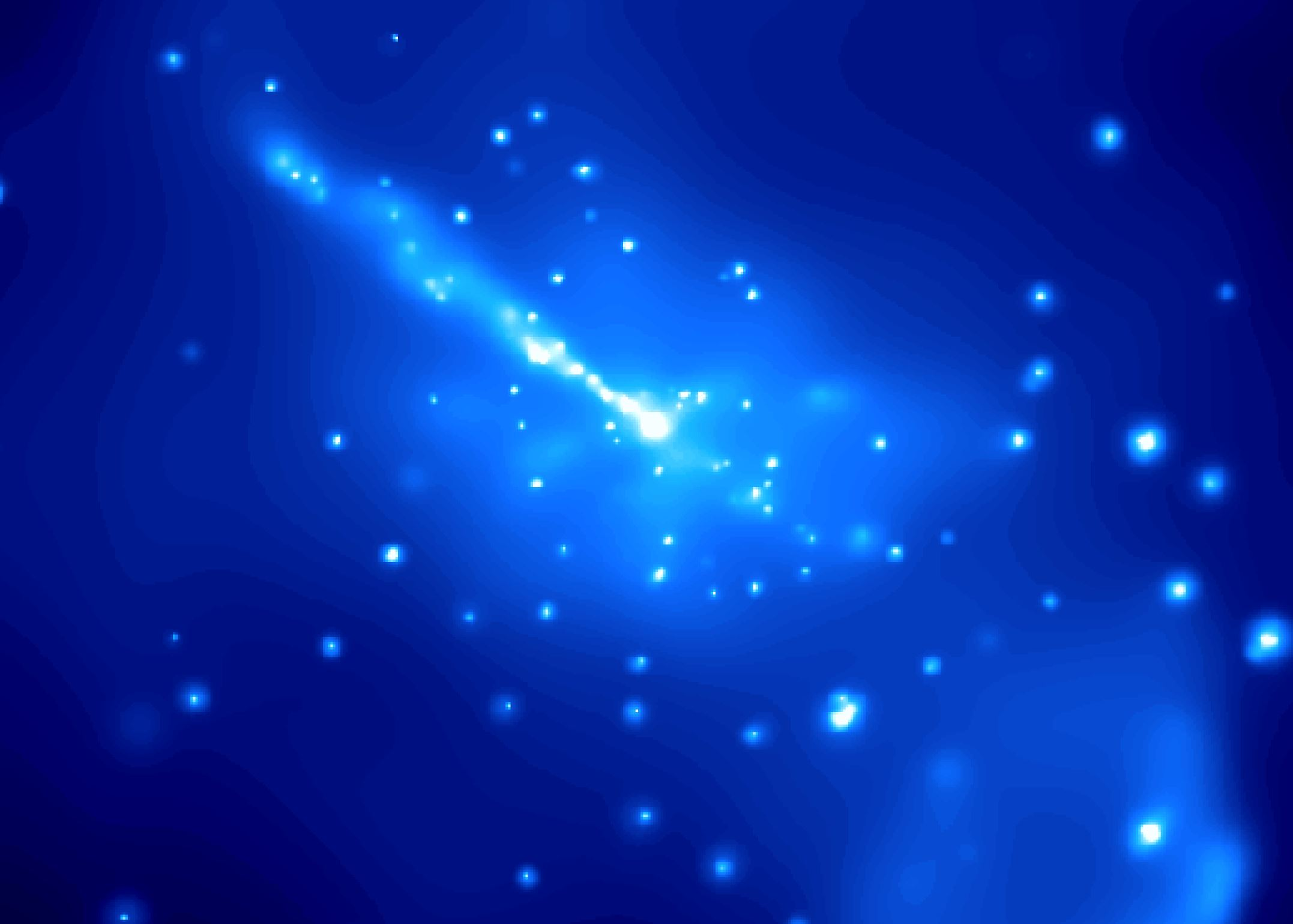
Chandra X-ray view of Cen A in X-rays showing one relativistic jet from the central black hole

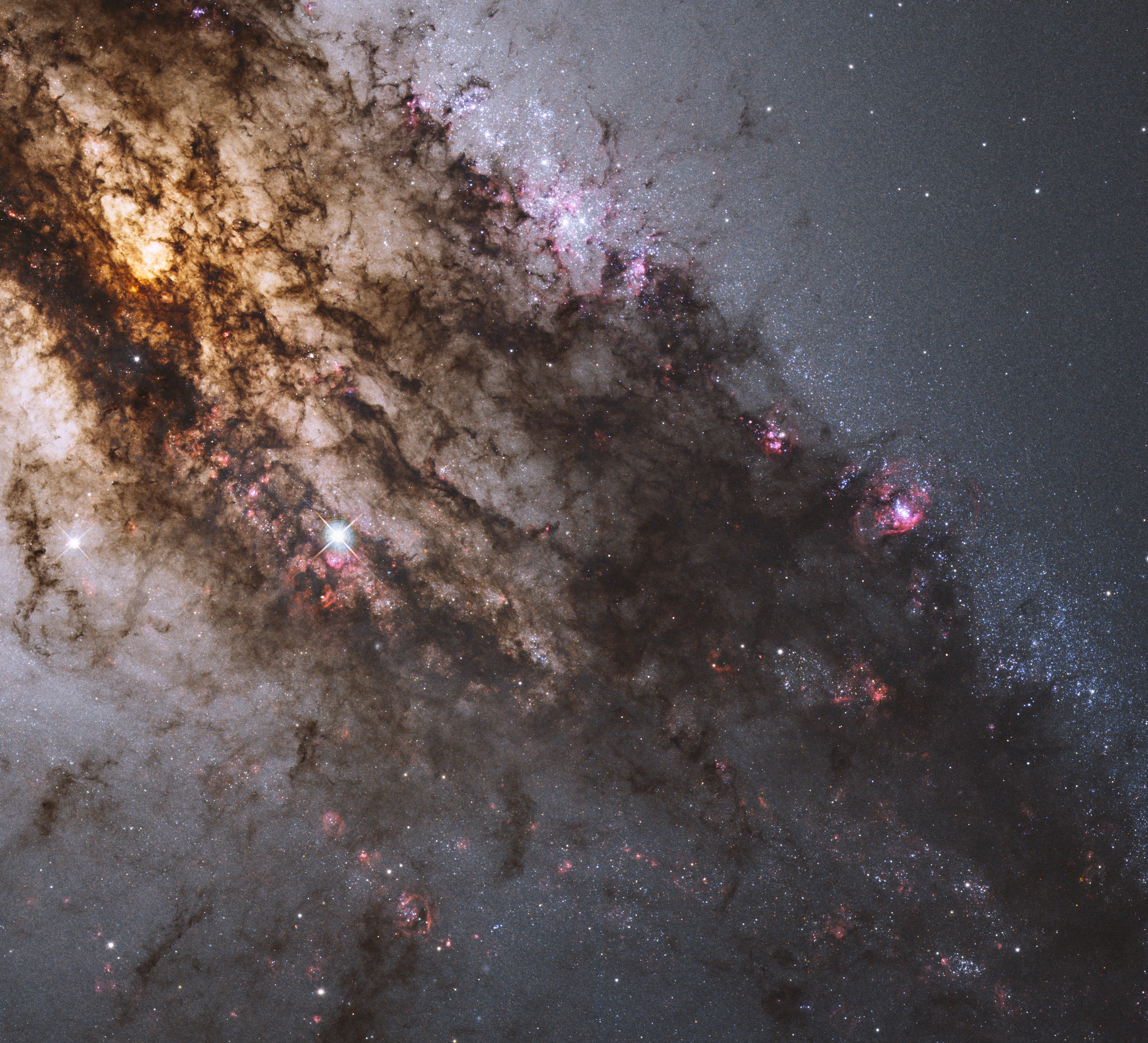
"Hubble's panchromatic vision... reveals the vibrant glow of young, blue star clusters..."

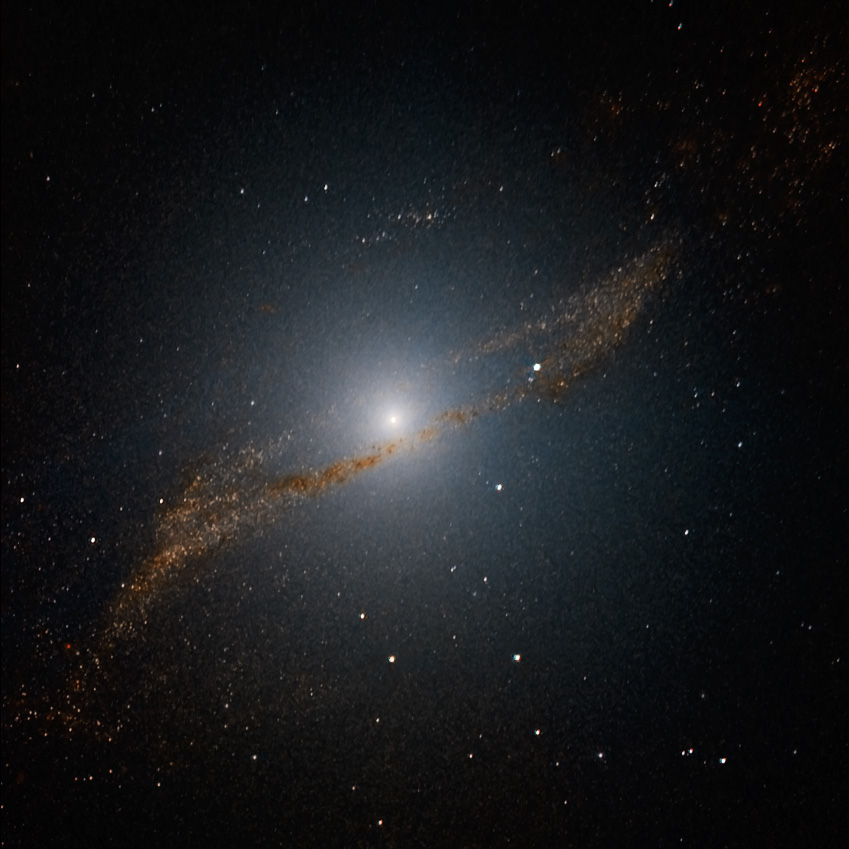
Image of the central parts of Centaurus A showing the parallelogram-shaped remains of a smaller galaxy that was absorbed about 200 to 700 million years ago

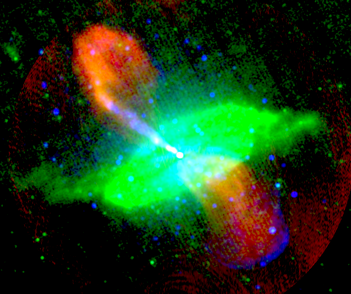
"False-colour image of Centaurus A, showing radio (red), 24-micrometre infrared (green) and 0.5–5 keV X-ray emission (blue)

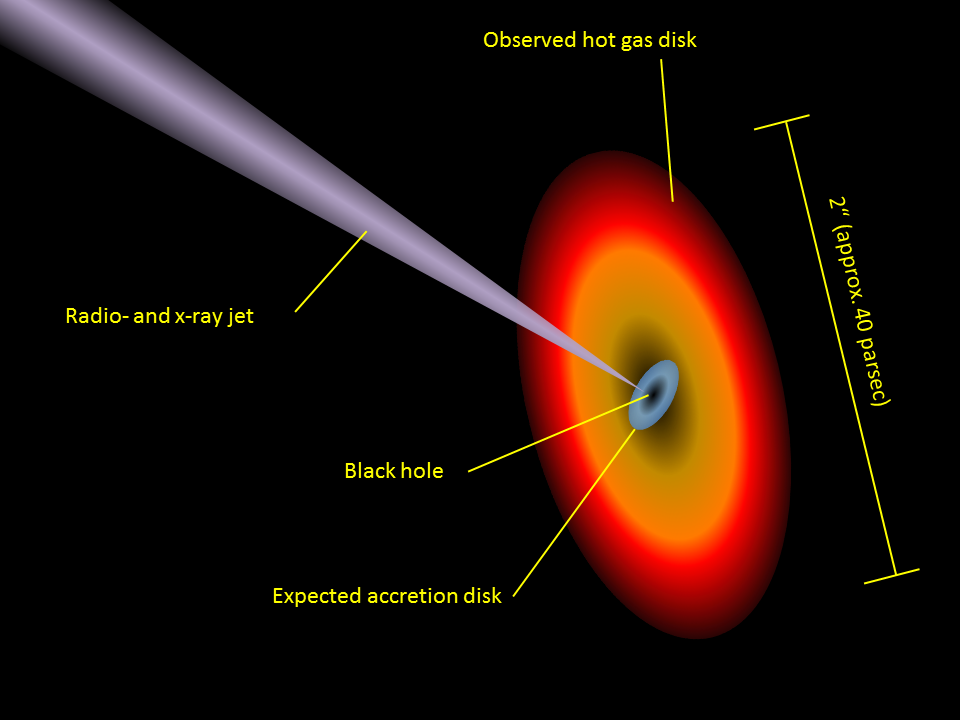
Central part of the galaxy

Video about Centaurus A jets

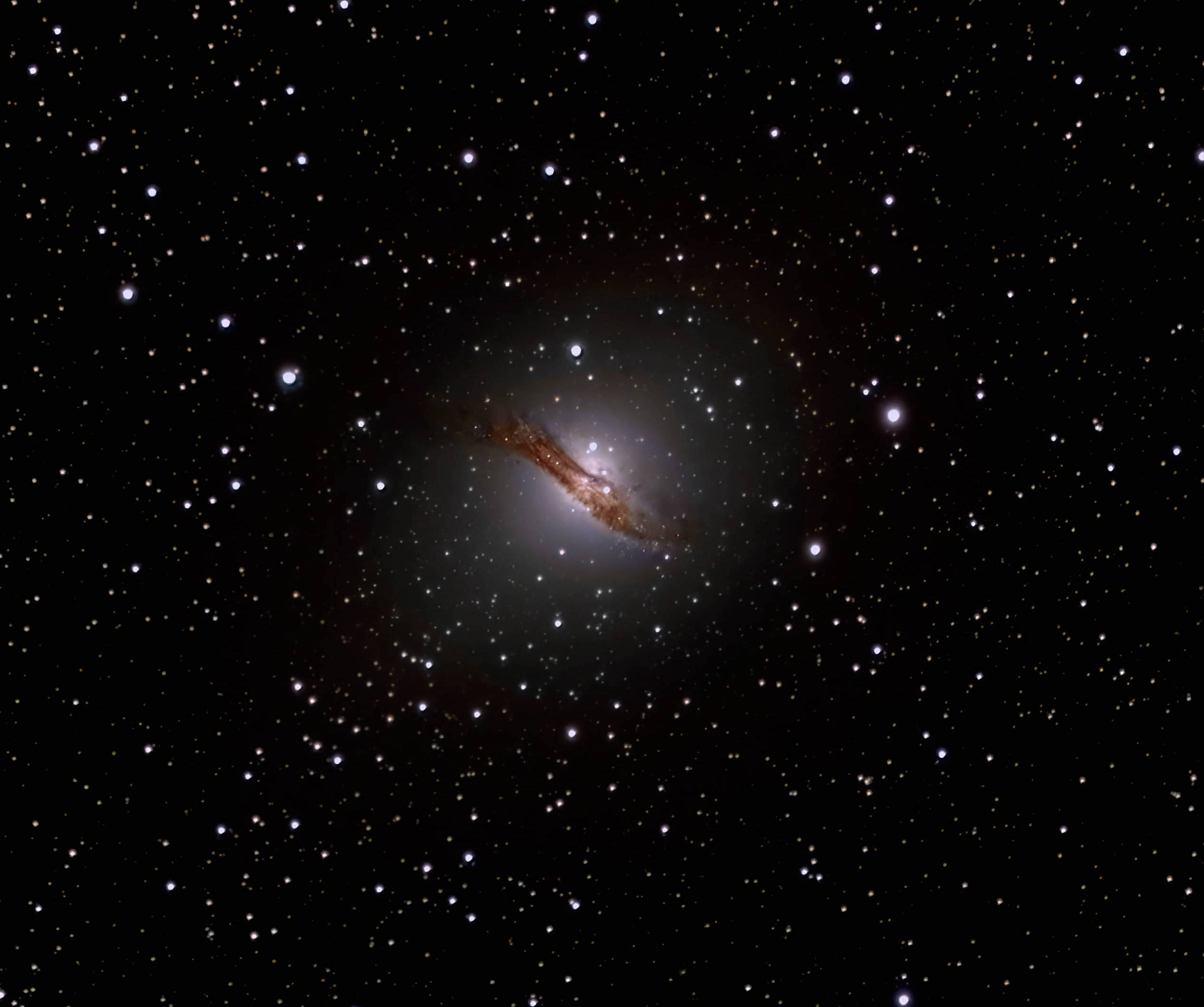
Amateur astronomer photo of Centaurus A

== See also ==
- Messier 87 – a giant elliptical galaxy that is also a strong radio source
- NGC 1316 – a similar lenticular galaxy that is also a strong radio source
- NGC 1106 - another lenticular galaxy with an active galactic nucleus

== Sources ==
- STScI. Hubble Provides Multiple Views of How to Feed a Black Hole. Press release: Space Telescope Science Institute. 14 March 1998.
- Chandra X-Ray Observatory Photo Album Centaurus A Jet
