= Lupus Cloud =

Star-forming region in constellation Lupus

Nebula
- Star-forming region
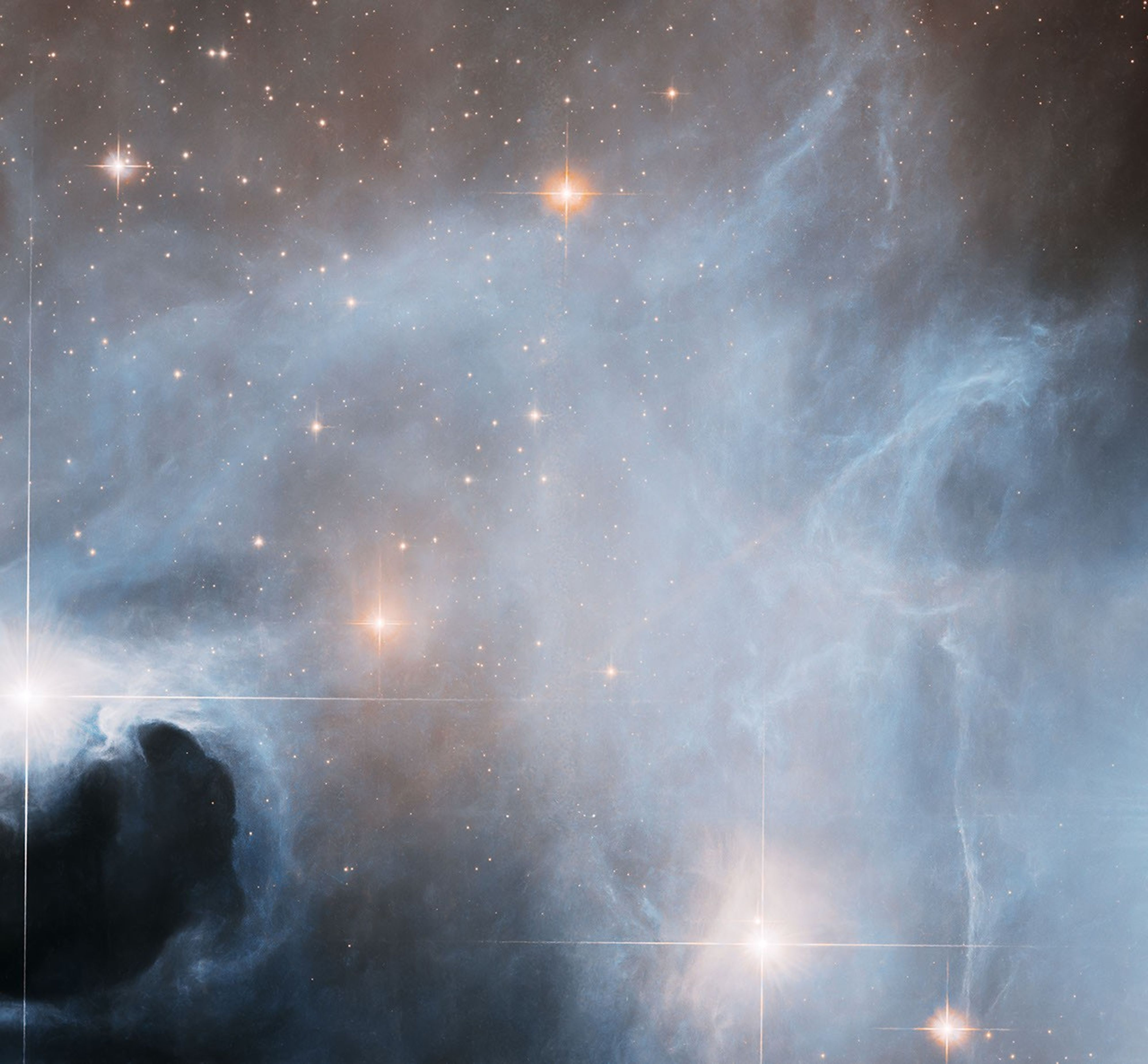
- Lupus 3 imaged by Hubble Space Telescope

Observation data: J2000 epoch
- Right ascension: 16^{h} 03^{m} 0.00^{s}
- Declination: −38° 06′ 0.0″
- Distance: 650 ly
- Constellation: Lupus
- Notable features: Associated with Scorpius–Centaurus association
- Designations: Lupus Molecular Cloud Complex, Lupus Region

Lupus Cloud (also known as Lupus Complex) is a system of dark nebulae physically connected to each other located in the constellation of Lupus. Lupus Cloud been part of various studies as it is one of the closest star-forming regions from the Solar System, where star formation phenomena for low mass stars takes place, a large part in the population of stars are T Tauri stars, which extends across all the nebulous filaments of the region, in particular on the northernmost components. Among these there are some particularly well-known and studied stars such as EX Lupi, the prototype of the EXors class of variable stars.

According to dynamical models of the region, star formation would have been favored by the expansion of stellar wind bubble generated by the most massive stars of the Upper Scorpius subgroup, the northernmost part of the Scorpius-Centaurus association,

== Observation ==
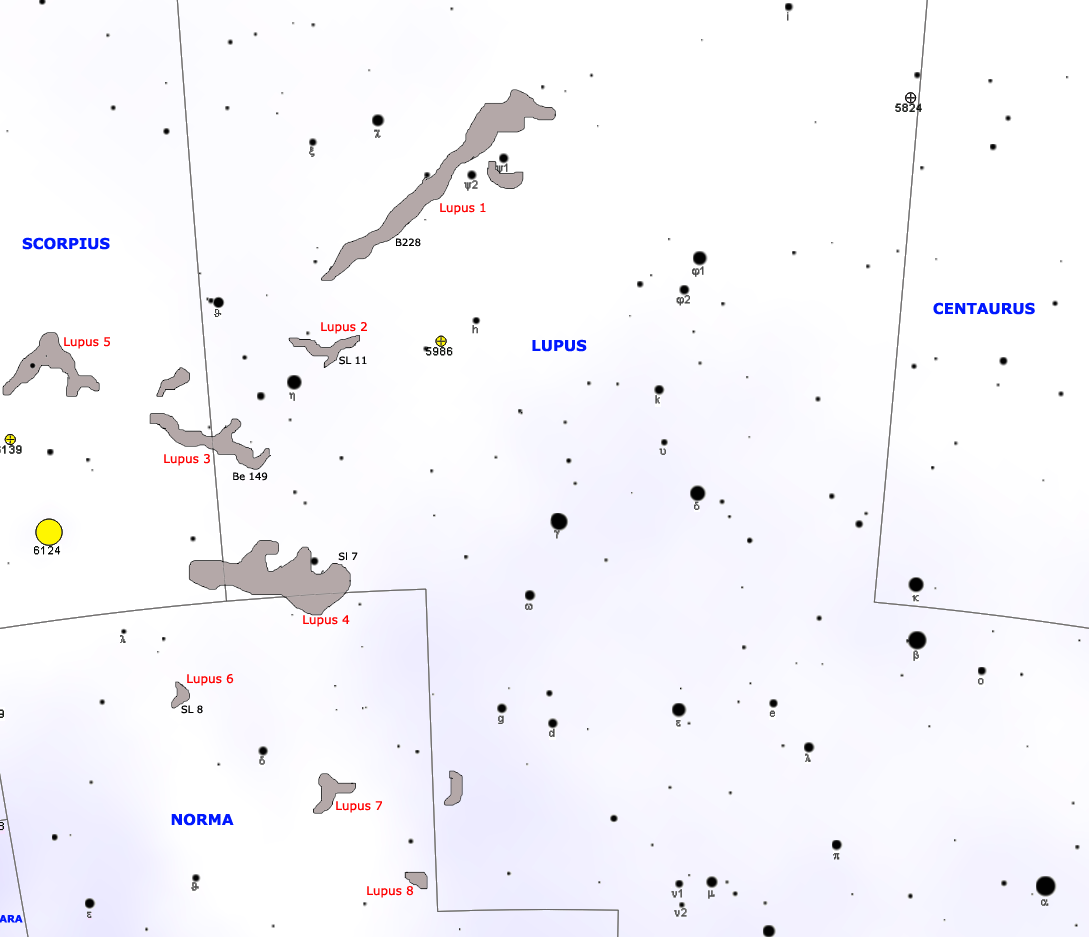
Map showing regions under Lupus Cloud

The Lupus Cloud is observed as a series of dark filaments of varying length and density visible in the northern and central regions of constellation Lupus being almost exclusively unilluminated clouds, they are not directly observable either with binoculars or with an amateur telescope. Their presence can be detected in long-exposure or composite photographs thanks to the fact that these clouds mask the star fields behind them. The longest filament is also the northernmost, and is located between the stars Chi Lupi and Psi¹ Lupi, closest to the latter, in this region, a part of the gas becomes visible as it appears directly illuminated by the blue stars located nearby. The other filaments extend to the south and southeast of this one, until they border on the adjacent constellations of Scorpius and Norma.

Because the constellation of Lupus has a rather southern average declination, its observation is significantly impaired from regions located in the Northern Hemisphere, and in particular from those north of the 50th parallel north. From the Southern Hemisphere, however, the constellation Lupus is visible most nights of the year and also appears very high above the horizon. The ideal time for its observation in the evening sky is between the months of May and September.

== Scorpius-Centaurus Association ==
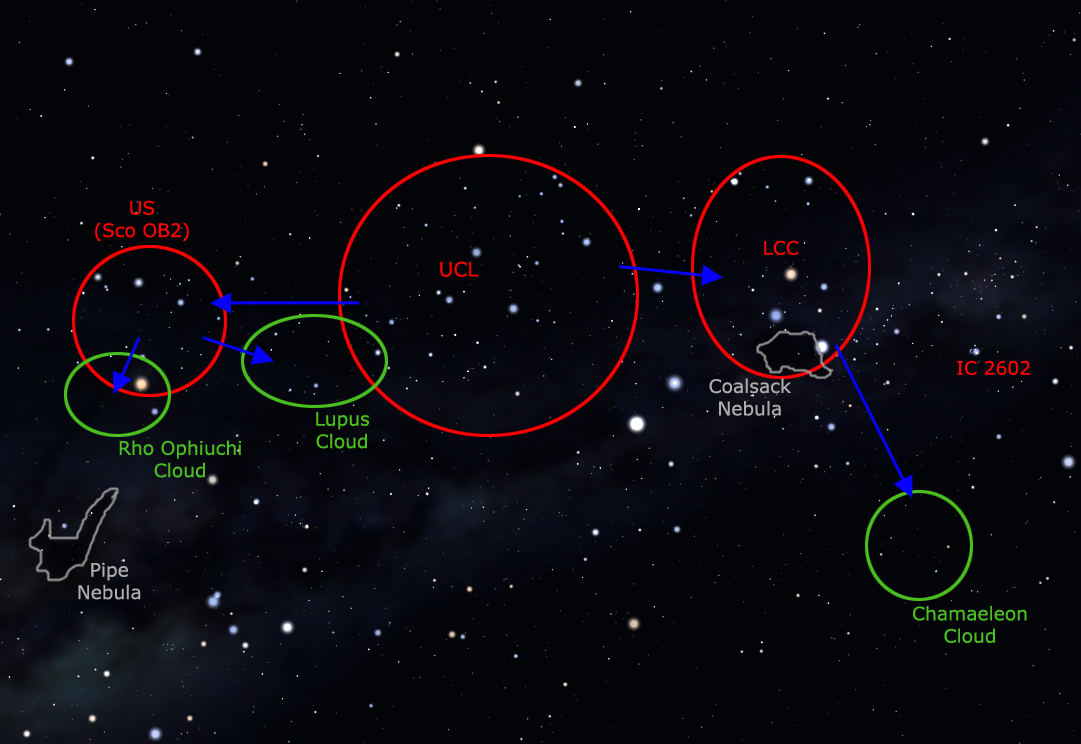
Dynamics of the possible star formation processes that led to the formation of the Scorpius-Centaurus association. Areas where star formation has ceased are shown in red, those where it is still active are shown in green, and inactive clouds are shown in gray

Lupus Cloud lies physically close to the large Scorpius Centaurus association, it is composed of all the blue stars that make up the constellations of Lupus, Centaurus, and Crux. The Lupus Cloud is located in a position of interruption between two of the association's main subgroups, the one called Upper Scorpius (US) and the Upper Centaurus-Lupus (UCL), which constitutes the central section of the association. The ages of these two subgroups are 5-6 million years and 14 million years, respectively. Knowledge of the dynamics that led to the formation and evolution of this large association plays a key role in understanding the origin of the Lupus Cloud.

According to some very simplified models, the star formation processes that led to the birth of the Scorpius-Centaurus association would have initially taken place in the northern part of the Upper Centaurus-Lupus group, about 17 million years ago, and would have then extended southwards, to the Lower Centaurus-Crux group, reaching their peak about 12 million years ago, the new stars would have been initially concentrated in small clusters and filaments surrounded by gas, containing tens or hundreds of stars. The residual gas of the progenitor molecular cloud would have subsequently been swept away by the combined action of the stellar wind and the eventual explosion of some supernovae. About 6 million years ago these generative processes extended to the clouds located south of the galactic equator, in particular in the region of the Chamaeleon cloud.

Starting from 12 million years ago, the bubble caused by the stellar wind of the young stars of the Upper Centaurus-Lupus group began its expansion, perhaps further accelerated by the explosion of some supernova at a later time, these supernovae were the result of the rapid evolution of the most massive components of the newly formed stellar group. About 5 million years ago the great pressure generated by the expansion front of the bubble compressed the molecular cloud located in correspondence with the current group of stars that form the head of Scorpius, generating the younger part of the association.

The wave of star formation that affected the Upper Scorpius Cloud generated a total of about 2,500 stars, including some particularly massive ones, supergiants stars with a mass greater than 10 M_{☉}, these stars subsequently exploded as supernovae and the powerful shock wave generated swept away almost all the residual gas of the ancient molecular cloud, hitting the adjacent Rho Ophiuchi cloud complex over the last million years, favoring in this region the intense star formation activity that can still be observed today. This same shock wave would have also hit the region where the Lupus Cloud is currently observed, compressing the gas and thus triggering star formation.

== Star formation phenomena ==
The star formation phenomena within the Lupus Cloud concern the birth of low and medium-mass stars, these forming stars, being immersed in the gases of the cloud, appear obscured and are therefore visible only as sources of infrared radiation. The brightest sources have been identified by IRAS among these, those definitely belonging to the environment of the Lupus Cloud are 17, associated with various young stellar objects and pre-main sequence stars, such as the variables RU Lupi, IN Lupi and EX Lupi. Most of these sources are concentrated in the first three substructures, Lupus 1, 2 and 3.

One of the most studied sources in the region is IRAS 15398–3359, associated with the Lupus 1 cloud and linked to a molecular jet with a dynamical age of about 2,000 years and a mass of 0.0007 M_{☉}. The central object from which this jet originates is thought to be a young accreting protostar, it is also associated with a more extended nebula, identified as a Herbig-Haro object and catalogued as HH 185, also observable in the visible light. A second well-known and studied source within Lupus 3 is the faint IRAS 16054–3857, as it would appear to coincide with a low-luminosity class 0 protostar, i.e. in the very early phase of its formation; the globule linked to this source is associated with the object HH 78 and would have a mass between 5 and 10 M_{☉}.

A total of 7 HH objects have been identified among the Lupus 1, 2 and 3 clouds, mostly associated with well-known young stellar objects, among these, HH 55 stands out, which although it is located near the young star RU Lupi, is not physically linked to it, but is generated by a very low luminosity object located in its vicinity. In general, if we exclude Lupus 3, for which partial data do not allow us to have a precise picture of the situation, the rate of star formation in the nebulous filaments of the Lupus Cloud is rather low compared to other similar nebulous regions, this could be explained by the disintegrating action of the intense ultraviolet radiation coming from the massive stars of the Scorpius-Centaurus association, which would not favor the collapse of the clouds but on the contrary would tend to make them dissolve in the interstellar medium.
