= Psi Lupi =

The Bayer designation Psi Lupi (ψ Lup / ψ Lupi) is shared by two stars, in the constellation Lupus:

- ψ¹ Lupi
- ψ² Lupi
