= C Scorpii =

The Bayer designation c Scorpii is shared by two star systems in the constellation Scorpius:

- c^{1} Scorpii (12 Scorpii)
- c^{2} Scorpii (13 Scorpii)
