= Mu Centauri =

Variable star in the constellation Centaurus

- Location of μ Centauri (circled)

Observation data Epoch J2000.0 Equinox ICRS
- Constellation: Centaurus
- Right ascension: 13^{h} 49^{m} 36.98863^{s}
- Declination: −42° 28′ 25.4296″
- Apparent magnitude (V): +3.42 (+2.92 to +3.49)

Characteristics
- Spectral type: B2V:e
- U−B color index: −0.854
- B−V color index: −0.205
- Variable type: γ Cas

Astrometry
Radial velocity (R_{v})	+9.2±2.7 km/s
Proper motion (μ)	RA: −24.25 mas/yr Dec.: −18.64 mas/yr
Parallax (π)	6.45±0.16 mas
Distance	510 ± 10 ly (155 ± 4 pc)
Absolute magnitude (M_{V})	−2.48

Details
Mass	9.1±0.2 M_{☉}
Radius	4.21 (equatorial); 3.4±0.3 (polar) R_{☉}
Luminosity	2,090 L_{☉}
Surface gravity (log g)	3.86 (equatorial); 4.33 (polar) cgs
Temperature	17,600 (equatorial); 23,200±200 (polar) K
Rotation	11.615 hours
Rotational velocity (v sin i)	194 km/s
Age	19.8±1.7 Myr

Other designations
- μ Cen, CD−41°8172, FK5 508, HD 120324, HIP 67472, HR 5193, SAO 224471

Database references
SIMBAD	data

Mu Centauri is a star in the southern constellation of Centaurus. Its name is a Bayer designation that is Latinized from μ Centauri, and abbreviated Mu Cen or μ Cen. With the stars ν and φ Centauri, it marks what has been traditionally portrayed as "dextro Latere" (the right side) of the Centaur. The apparent visual magnitude of this star is 3.42, making it one of the brighter members of the constellation. The distance to this star can be estimated directly using parallax measurements, which yield a value of roughly 510 light years (155 parsecs) from Earth. It is drifting further away with a radial velocity of +9 km/s.

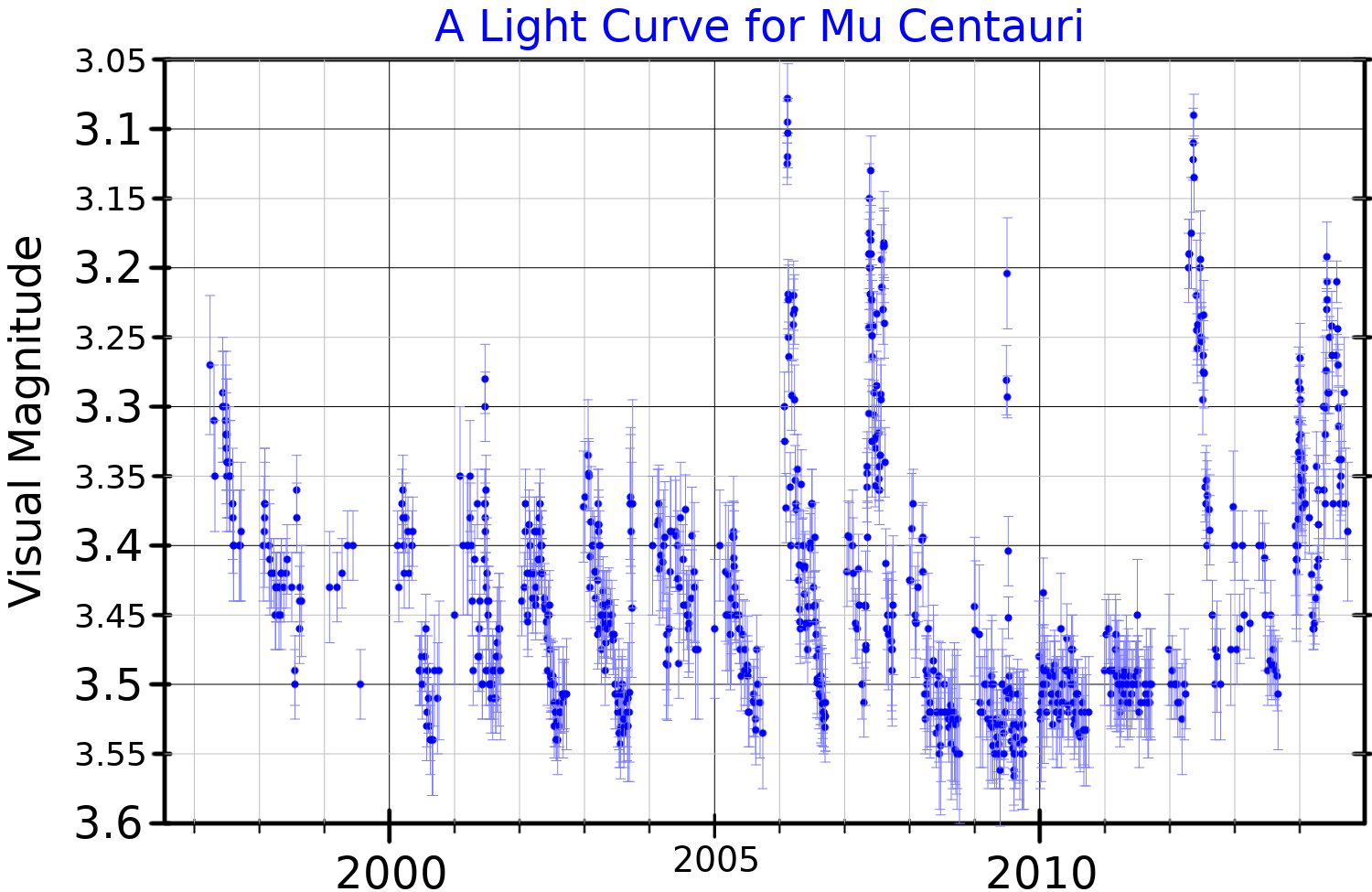
A visual band light curve for Mu Centauri, plotted from data published by Aguayo et al. (2018)

The spectrum of Mu Centauri is considered to be a standard for a B2 Be star with the stellar classification of B2V:e. The 'e' suffix is used to mark the presence of emission lines, caused by a circumstellar disk of hot gas that was formed from material ejected from the star. Mu Centauri is a pulsating variable star that has multiple non-radial cycles with a primary period of 0.503 days. Three other pulsation cycles have a similar period, while two have a shorter interval of about 0.28 days. It undergoes outburst events that result in the transfer of additional material to the surrounding disk. During these outbursts, the star can experience transient periodicities. Mu Centauri is classified as a Gamma Cassiopeiae type variable star and its brightness varies from magnitude +2.92 to +3.49.

This star is spinning rapidly, with a projected rotational velocity of 194 km s^{−1} and is completing a full rotation in about 11.615 hours. The equatorial azimuthal velocity is around 85% of the critical velocity where the star would start to break up, resulting a pronounced equatorial bulge that is about 26% wider than the radius at the poles. Because of the oblate spheroidal shape of this star, the polar region is at a higher temperature than the equator—23,000 K versus 17,600 K respectively. Likewise, the gravitational force at the poles is greater than along the equator. The axis of rotation of the star is tilted by an angle of about (19 ± 3)° to the line of sight from the Earth.

At an estimated age of nearly 20 million years, this star is around 55–65% of the way through its evolutionary period on the main sequence of core hydrogen burning stars. It has around nine times the mass of the Sun and four times the Sun's radius, but emits over 2,000 times as much energy as the Sun. The outer atmosphere has a mean effective temperature of 22,410 K, giving the star a blue-white hue.

This star is a proper motion member of the Upper Centaurus–Lupus sub-group in the Scorpius–Centaurus OB association, the nearest such co-moving association of massive stars to the Sun.
