= Nu Centauri =

Binary star system in the constellation Centaurus

- Location of ν Centauri (circled)

Observation data Epoch J2000.0 Equinox J2000.0
- Constellation: Centaurus
- Right ascension: 13^{h} 49^{m} 30.27644^{s}
- Declination: −41° 41′ 15.7521″
- Apparent magnitude (V): +3.41

Characteristics
- Spectral type: B2 IV
- U−B color index: −0.891
- B−V color index: −0.234
- Variable type: Ellipsoidal + β Cep

Astrometry
Radial velocity (R_{v})	+9.0 km/s
Proper motion (μ)	RA: −26.77 mas/yr Dec.: −20.18 mas/yr
Parallax (π)	7.47±0.17 mas
Distance	437 ± 10 ly (134 ± 3 pc)
Absolute magnitude (M_{V})	−2.4

Orbit
Period (P)	2.622±0.018 d
Eccentricity (e)	0
Periastron epoch (T)	2,450,894.32±0.01
Semi-amplitude (K_{1}) (primary)	22.4±0.4 km/s

Details

A
Mass	7.1–10.2 M_{☉}
Radius	3.93–4.56 R_{☉}
Luminosity	3,500–4,700 L_{☉}
Surface gravity (log g)	4.103–4.132 cgs
Temperature	22,400 K
Rotational velocity (v sin i)	90 km/s
Age	18.2±3.2 Myr

B
Mass	0.59–1.45 M_{☉}
Radius	1.30–2.10 R_{☉}
Luminosity	1.91–5.25 L_{☉}
Surface gravity (log g)	3.965–3.987 cgs
Temperature	5,790–6,150 K

Other designations
- Heng, ν Cen, CD−41°8171, GC 18665, HD 120307, HIP 67464, HR 5190, SAO 224469

Database references
SIMBAD	data

Nu Centauri is a binary star system in the southern constellation of Centaurus. It has the proper name Heng; Nu Centauri is its Bayer designation, which is Latinized from ν Centauri and abbreviated Nu Cen or ν Cen. The combined apparent visual magnitude of the pair is +3.41, making this one of the brightest members of the constellation. Based upon parallax measurements made during the Hipparcos mission, this star system is located at a distance of roughly 437 light-years (134 parsecs) from Earth. The margin of error for this distance is about 2%, which is enough to give an error in distance of ±10 light years.

This is a single-lined spectroscopic binary system, which means that the two stellar components have not been individually resolved with a telescope. Instead, their orbital motion can be tracked through periodic shifts in the spectrum of the primary. The gravitational perturbation of the hidden secondary component upon the primary is causing the latter to first move toward and then away from the Earth, creating Doppler shift changes in the spectrum. From these subtle shifts, the orbital elements of the pair can be extracted. The pair are orbiting their common center of mass in a circular orbit with a period of only 2.622 days, indicating that they are in a relatively tight orbit.

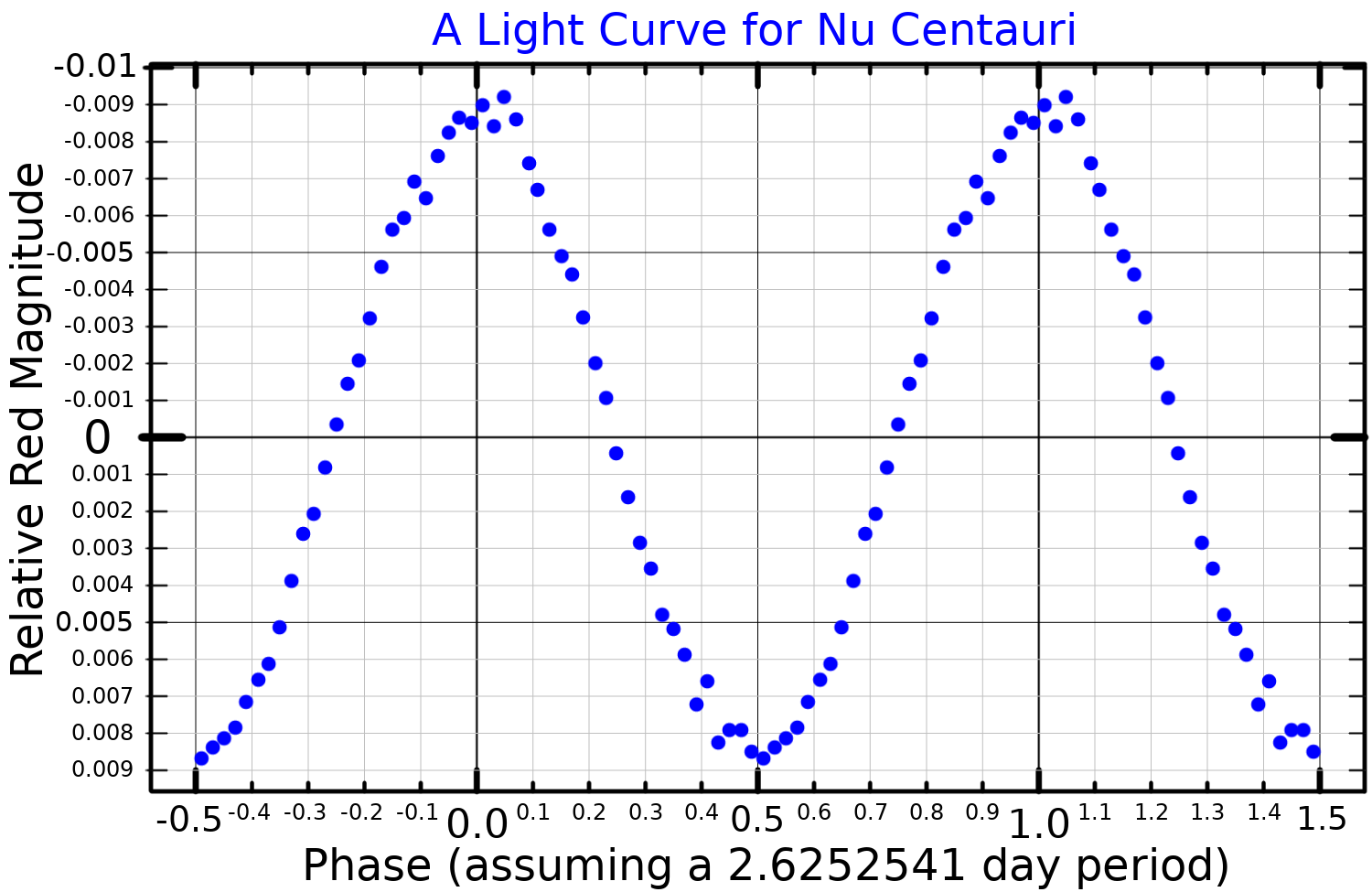
A red-light light curve for Nu Centauri, adapted from Jerzykiewicz et al. (2021)

The interaction between the two components of this system appears to be creating emission lines in the spectrum, turning the primary into a Be star. It has a stellar classification of B2 IV, which matches a massive B-type subgiant star. The primary has 8.5 times the mass of the Sun and 6.4 times the Sun's radius. It is a Beta Cephei type variable star with a brightness that periodically varies from magnitude +3.38 to +3.41 over an interval of 0.17 days. The tidal interaction with the secondary component has turned it into a rotating ellipsoidal variable.

This star system is a proper motion member of the Upper Centaurus–Lupus sub-group in the Scorpius–Centaurus OB association, the nearest such association of co-moving massive stars to the Sun.

In Chinese astronomy, the constellation Heng (衡) consists of four stars: ν Centauri (the determinative star), μ Centauri, φ Centauri, and χ Centauri. It is located within the super-constellation Kulou (see ι Centauri). The IAU Working Group on Star Names approved the name Heng for Nu Centauri A on 16 March 2025 and it is now so entered in the IAU Catalog of Star Names.
