= Rho Centauri =

Binary star system in the constellation Centaurus

- Location of ρ Centauri (circled)

Observation data Epoch J2000.0 Equinox ICRS
- Constellation: Centaurus
- Right ascension: 12^{h} 11^{m} 39.12805^{s}
- Declination: −52° 22′ 06.4067″
- Apparent magnitude (V): +3.97

Characteristics
- Evolutionary stage: main sequence
- Spectral type: B3 V
- U−B color index: −0.650
- B−V color index: −0.156±0.008

Astrometry
Radial velocity (R_{v})	+15.0±4.1 km/s
Proper motion (μ)	RA: −43.741 mas/yr Dec.: −11.771 mas/yr
Parallax (π)	11.8348±0.3746 mas
Distance	276 ± 9 ly (84 ± 3 pc)
Absolute magnitude (M_{V})	−1.33

Orbit
Primary	A
Name	B
Period (P)	3.626 yr
Semi-major axis (a)	0.0440″
Eccentricity (e)	0.619
Inclination (i)	164°
Longitude of the node (Ω)	225°
Periastron epoch (T)	2019.237
Argument of periastron (ω) (secondary)	54°

Details

A
Mass	5.413 M_{☉}
Radius	3.8 R_{☉}
Luminosity	810.42 L_{☉}
Surface gravity (log g)	3.95 cgs
Temperature	19,500 K
Rotational velocity (v sin i)	147 km/s
Age	23.7±1.4 Myr

B
Mass	3.583 M_{☉}

Other designations
- Rho Cen, ρ Cen, CD−51°6455, HD 105937, HIP 59449, HR 4638, SAO 239737

Database references
SIMBAD	data

Rho Centauri is a binary star system in the southern constellation of Centaurus. Its name is a Bayer designation that is Latinized from ρ Centauri, and abbreviated Rho Cen or ρ Cen. This star is visible to the naked eye as a blue-white hued point of light with a combined apparent visual magnitude of +3.97. The system is located approximately 276 light years from the Sun based on parallax, and is drifting further away with a radial velocity of around +15 km/s. It is a proper motion member of the Lower Centaurus–Crux sub-group in the Scorpius–Centaurus OB association, the nearest such association of co-moving massive stars to the Sun.

The primary component of this system is a B-type main-sequence star with a stellar classification of B3 V. It is about 24 million years old with a high rate of spin, showing a projected rotational velocity of 147 km/s. It has 5.4 times the mass of the Sun and 3.8 times the Sun's radius. The star is radiating 810 times the luminosity of the Sun from its photosphere at an effective temperature of 19,500 K.

The secondary companion is 1.1 magnitudes fainter than the primary, with a projected separation of 5.68 AU along a position angle of 19.72°, as of 2013. It revolves around the primary star in 3.6 years, on an ecccentric orbit. The mass is estimated at 3.6 times that of the Sun, or 66% that of the primary.
