= 12 Scorpii =

Star in the constellation Scorpius

Observation data Epoch J2000.0 Equinox ICRS
- Constellation: Scorpius
- Right ascension: 16^{h} 12^{m} 16.039^{s}
- Declination: −28° 25′ 02.31″
- Apparent magnitude (V): 5.67 (5.79 + 7.9 + 8.13)

Characteristics
- Spectral type: B9V + K7.9XR? + F3V
- U−B color index: −0.19
- B−V color index: +0.01

Astrometry
Radial velocity (R_{v})	−0.2±1.8 km/s
Proper motion (μ)	RA: −23.68±0.76 mas/yr Dec.: −42.44±0.69 mas/yr
Parallax (π)	10.75±0.80 mas
Distance	300 ± 20 ly (93 ± 7 pc)
Absolute magnitude (M_{V})	+0.56

Details

12 Sco A
Mass	2.939±0.088 M_{☉}
Luminosity	91 L_{☉}
Temperature	11,402 K
Age	150 Myr

Other designations
- c^{1} Sco, 12 Sco, CD−28°11962, FK5 3226, HD 145483, HIP 79399, HR 6029, SAO 184217

Database references
SIMBAD	data

12 Scorpii is a probable triple star system in the zodiac constellation of Scorpius, located about 300 light years away from the Sun. It has the Bayer designation c^{1} Scorpii; 12 Scorpii is the Flamsteed designation. This system is faintly visible to the naked eye with a combined apparent visual magnitude of 5.67. It is a probable (82% chance) member of the Sco OB2 moving group.

The magnitude 5.79 primary component is a B-type main-sequence star with a stellar classification of B9V. This star is 150 million years old with three times the mass of the Sun. It is radiating 91 times the Sun's luminosity from its photosphere at an effective temperature of 11,402 K. At an angular separation of 0.20″ is a K7.9 type secondary companion, a possible X-ray source. The third component is an F-type main-sequence star of class F3V and magnitude 8.13, located at a separation of 3.84″.
