= HD 100453 =

Young binary in constellation Centaurus

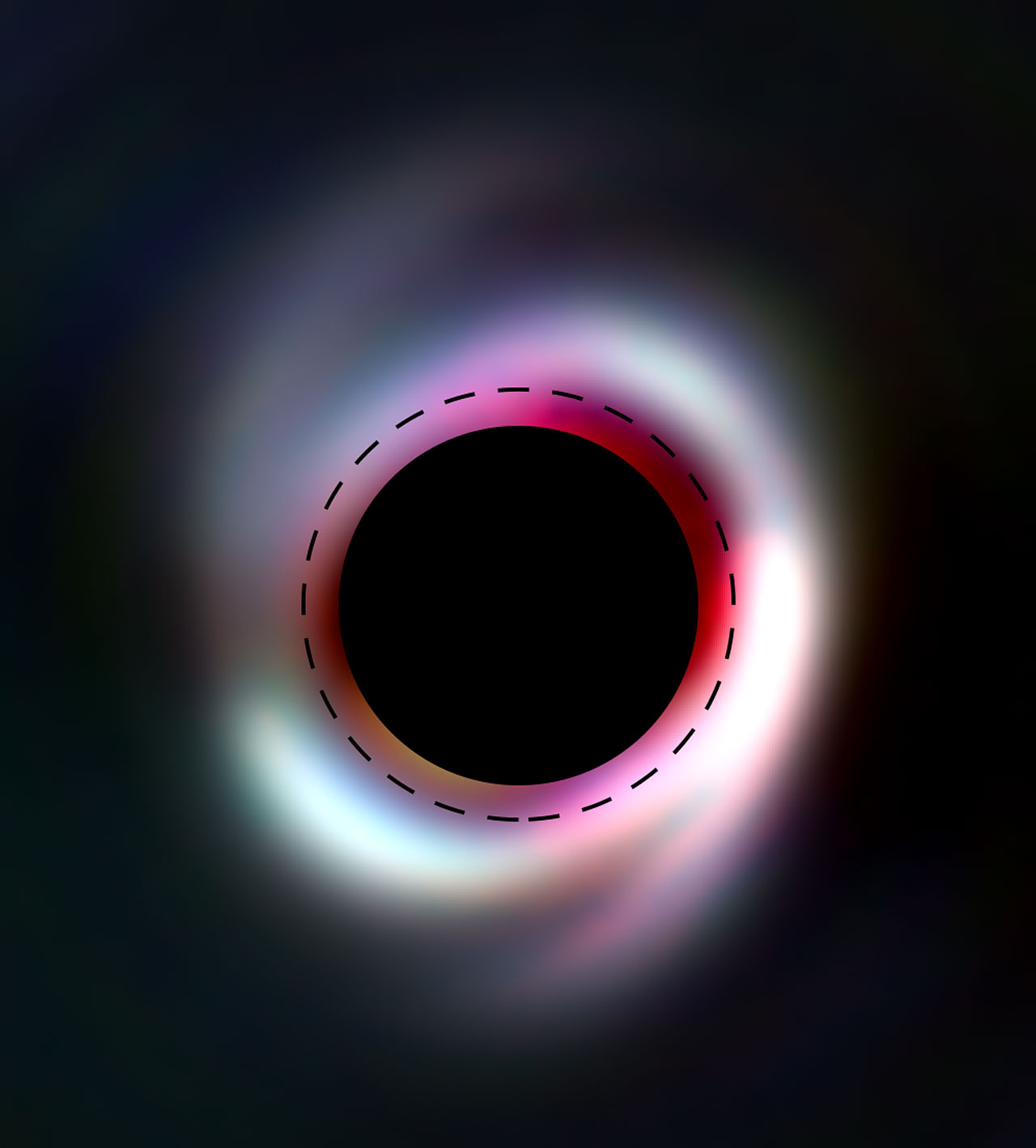
- An unusual structure around HD 100453 uncovered by ESO's SPHERE, a planet-hunting instrument installed on the Very Large Telescope in Chile

Observation data Epoch J2000 Equinox ICRS
- Constellation: Centaurus
- Right ascension: 11^{h} 33^{m} 05.5766^{s}
- Declination: −54° 19′ 28.547″
- Apparent magnitude (V): 7.79

Characteristics
- Evolutionary stage: Herbig Ae/Be star
- Spectral type: A9Ve
- Apparent magnitude (g): 7.735
- Apparent magnitude (B): 8.07
- Apparent magnitude (R): 7.63
- Apparent magnitude (K): 5.60

Astrometry
Radial velocity (R_{v})	14.597 km/s
Proper motion (μ)	RA: −36.96±0.02 mas/yr Dec.: −5.86±0.02 mas/yr
Parallax (π)	9.636±0.022 mas
Distance	338.5 ± 0.8 ly (103.8 ± 0.2 pc)
Absolute magnitude (M_{V})	+2.39

Orbit
Semi-major axis (a)	207 au
Eccentricity (e)	0.32
Inclination (i)	49°
Longitude of the node (Ω)	47°
Periastron epoch (T)	1790
Argument of periastron (ω) (secondary)	18°

Details

A
Mass	1.60+0.05 −0.04 M_{☉}
Radius	1.57 ± 0.11 (Note: Calculated, using the Stefan-Boltzmann law and the star's effective temperature and luminosity, with respect to the solar nominal effective temperature of 5,772 K: $$\sqrt{\biggl(\frac{5,772}{7,250}\biggr)^4 \cdot 10^{0.79}} = 1.57\ R_\odot.$$) R_{☉}
Luminosity	6.31±0.14 L_{☉}
Surface gravity (log g)	4.47±0.05 cgs
Temperature	7,250±250 K
Metallicity [Fe/H]	−0.1±0.1 dex
Rotation	0.92±0.10 days
Rotational velocity (v sin i)	50±3 km/s
Age	19.28+0.70 −0.68 Myr

B
Mass	0.20±0.04 M_{☉}
Radius	0.77 (Note: Calculated, using the Stefan-Boltzmann law and the star's effective temperature and luminosity, with respect to the solar nominal effective temperature of 5,772 K: $$\sqrt{\biggl(\frac{5,772}{3,250}\biggr)^4 \cdot 0.06} = 0.77\ R_\odot.$$) R_{☉}
Luminosity	0.06 L_{☉}
Temperature	3,250 K

Other designations
- CD−53°4102, HIP 56354, TYC 8617-1438-1, GSC 08617-01438, 2MASS J11330559-5419285

Database references
SIMBAD	data

HD 100453 is a binary star system which lies in the constellation Centaurus about 350 light years away from the Sun and is a member of the open cluster Scorpius–Centaurus association.

== Components ==
The apparent magnitudes of the visible components A and B are 7.8 and 15.9 respectively. The primary is a Herbig Ae/Be star, which is young but no longer accreting mass. The secondary is an M4 class red dwarf star at the projected separation 120 AU from the primary.

== Circumstellar disks ==
The primary star is surrounded by two dust disks, separated by a gap. The disks are orbiting in different planes, misaligned by 72 degrees. The disk misalignment may be caused by a suspected superjovian planet orbiting within the gap, roughly 15–20 AU from the primary. The outer disk has a 2-arm spiral structure caused by the outer stellar companion HD 100453B. The outer disk is rather massive at 0.0174 M_{☉}, but is significantly depleted in gas, with a gas-to-dust mass ratio of no more than 4:1.

The HD 100453A planetary system
Companion (in order from star)	Mass	Semimajor axis (AU)	Orbital period (days)	Eccentricity	Inclination (°)	Radius
inner disk	0.315 AU				46.05^{+0.88}_{−0.92} °	—
outer disk	45 AU				33.80^{+0.77}_{−0.72}°	—

The gas present in the disks is unusually depleted in nitrogen and hydrogen-bearing compounds and enriched in carbon monoxide. Molecular hydrogen was not detected. Solid silicate material present in the disks shows good crystallinity, with reduced amounts of amorphous material.

No disks were detected around the companion star HD 100453B, with the upper limit on the amount of dust around it being 0.03 M_{🜨}.
