= Pi Centauri =

Binary star in the constellation Centaurus

- Location of π Centauri (circled in red)

Observation data Epoch J2000.0 Equinox ICRS
- Constellation: Centaurus
- Right ascension: 11^{h} 21^{m} 00.41^{s}
- Declination: −54° 29′ 27.7″
- Apparent magnitude (V): +3.90 (4.08 + 5.65)

Characteristics
- Evolutionary stage: main sequence
- Spectral type: B5Vn + B6V
- B−V color index: −0.157±0.015

Astrometry
Radial velocity (R_{v})	+9.4±3.7 km/s
Proper motion (μ)	RA: −35.85±0.34< mas/yr Dec.: −1.72±0.27 mas/yr
Parallax (π)	9.12±0.34 mas
Distance	360 ± 10 ly (110 ± 4 pc)
Absolute magnitude (M_{V})	−1.30

Orbit
Period (P)	39.0±0.19 yr
Semi-major axis (a)	0.2263±0.0011″
Eccentricity (e)	0.8530±0.0040
Inclination (i)	19.4±4.9°
Longitude of the node (Ω)	327.8±3.9°
Periastron epoch (T)	2010.410±0.037
Argument of periastron (ω) (secondary)	340.3±4.0°

Details

A
Mass	6.43 M_{☉}
Temperature	16,760 K
Rotational velocity (v sin i)	340 km/s
Age	13.9 Myr

B
Mass	3.68 M_{☉}

Other designations
- π Cen, CPD−53°4498, FK5 428, GC 15601, HD 98718, HIP 55425, HR 4390, SAO 238986, CCDM J11210-5429

Database references
SIMBAD	data

Pi Centauri is a binary star system in the southern constellation of Centaurus. Its name is a Bayer designation that is Latinized from π Centauri, and abbreviated Pi Cen or π Cen. This pair has a blue-white hue and is visible to the naked eye with a combined apparent visual magnitude of +3.90. The system is located at a distance of approximately 360 light years from the Sun based on parallax, and is drifting further away with a radial velocity of around +9 km/s. It is a member of the Lower Centaurus–Crux subgroup of the Scorpius–Centaurus association.

The magnitude +4.08 primary, designated component A, is a B-type main-sequence star with a stellar classification of B5Vn, where the 'n' suffix indicates broad, diffuse (nebulous) lines due to rapid rotation. This star is spinning with a projected rotational velocity of 340 km/s, giving it an equatorial bulge that is 22% larger than the polar radius. It has 6.4 times the mass of the Sun and is radiating 783 times the Sun's luminosity from its photosphere at an effective temperature of 16,760 K.

The secondary companion, component B, is magnitude +5.65 with a class of B6V and 3.7 times the Sun's mass. The pair orbit around their common barycentre once every 39 years with an eccentricity of 0.8530. The semi-major axis of the companion is 0.23 arcseconds at an inclination of 19.4°.
