= HD 75747 =

Star in the constellation Chamaeleon

- Location of HD 75747 (circled)

Observation data Epoch J2000.0 Equinox ICRS
- Constellation: Chamaeleon
- Right ascension: 08^{h} 43^{m} 12.19841^{s}
- Declination: −79° 04′ 12.3685″
- Apparent magnitude (V): 6.02 to 6.68

Characteristics
- Spectral type: A8 IV + A8 IV
- U−B color index: +0.08
- B−V color index: +0.24
- Variable type: Algol + δ Scuti

Astrometry
Radial velocity (R_{v})	16.1±4.3 km/s
Proper motion (μ)	RA: −27.263 mas/yr Dec.: +28.179 mas/yr
Parallax (π)	10.137±0.0213 mas
Distance	321.7 ± 0.7 ly (98.6 ± 0.2 pc)
Absolute magnitude (M_{V})	+1.21

Orbit
Period (P)	1.6699 d
Semi-major axis (a)	9.14 R_{☉}
Eccentricity (e)	0.00
Inclination (i)	83.4°
Periastron epoch (T)	2,438,380.526 JD
Argument of periastron (ω) (secondary)	0.00°
Semi-amplitude (K_{1}) (primary)	136.1 km/s
Semi-amplitude (K_{2}) (secondary)	138.9 km/s

Details
Luminosity	17.3±1.2 (combined) L_{☉}
Metallicity [Fe/H]	−0.38±0.06 or +0.17 dex
Age	912±21 or 9.5 Myr

A
Mass	1.86±0.02 M_{☉}
Radius	2.14±0.06 R_{☉}
Surface gravity (log g)	4.05±0.02 cgs
Temperature	8,050±200 K
Rotational velocity (v sin i)	64±6 km/s

B
Mass	1.82±0.02 M_{☉}
Radius	2.34±0.06 R_{☉}
Surface gravity (log g)	3.96±0.02 cgs
Temperature	7,444±129 K
Rotational velocity (v sin i)	70±6 km/s

Other designations
- 9 G. Chamaeleontis, RS Cha, CD−78°342, CPD−78°378, GC 12128, HD 75747, HIP 42794, HR 3524, SAO 256549, WDS 08413-7858CD

Database references
SIMBAD	data

HD 75747, also known as HR 3524 or RS Chamaeleontis (RS Cha), is a binary star located in the southern circumpolar constellation Chamaeleon. It has an average apparent magnitude of 6.05, making it barely visible to the naked eye. The system is located relatively close at a distance of 322 light years based on Gaia DR3 parallax measurements but is receding with a somewhat constrained heliocentric radial velocity of 16.1 km/s. It has an absolute magnitude of +1.21.

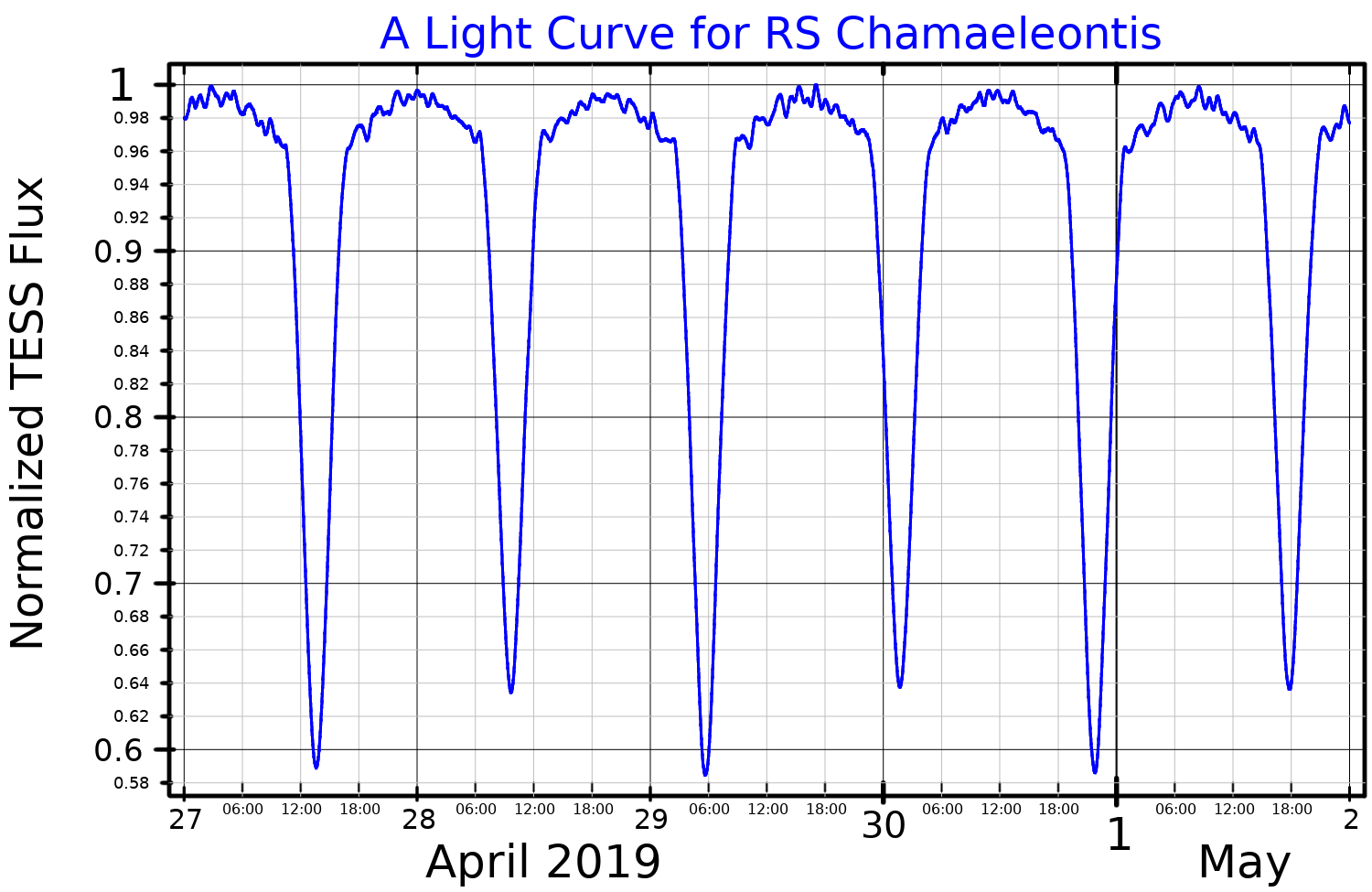
A light curve for RS Chamaeleontis, plotted from TESS data

HD 75747 was known to be variable since 1960 based on observations by A. W. J. Cousins. The system was first observed as an eclipsing binary in 1967 by astronomers P. A. T. Wild and H. C. Lagerweij. J. Andersen deduced a circular orbit with a period of 1.66 days for the system. Subsequent observations revealed that one of the components as a δ Scuti variable. RS Cha is an Algol-type eclipsing binary ranging from 6.02 to 6.58 or 6.68 within 1.6699 days, depending on the eclipse. This system is part of the η Chamaeleontis association, a group of young stars moving with Eta Cha, and Eta Cha is just eight arc-minutes to the northwest of RS Cha.

Both components have a stellar classification of A8 IV, indicating that both objects are slightly evolved A-type subgiants. RS Cha A and B have masses nearly double of the Sun's and 2.14 - 2.34 times the radius of the Sun. They radiate 17.3 times the luminosity of the Sun from its photosphere at effective temperatures of 8,050 K and 7,444 K respectively, giving the object a white hue. RS Cha was originally thought to be 912 million years old, meaning that both stars were evolving off the main sequence. However, astronomer E. Alecian and colleagues re-examined the age of the system and it turns out that HD 75747 is only 9 million years old, making them pre-main sequence stars. The components rotation periods are synchronous to the orbital period, having projected rotational velocities of 64 km/s and 70 km/s respectively.
