= Epsilon Centauri =

Star in the constellation Centaurus

ε Centauri
- Location of ε Centauri (circled)

Observation data Epoch J2000 Equinox ICRS
- Constellation: Centaurus
- Right ascension: 13^{h} 39^{m} 53.25774^{s}
- Declination: −53° 27′ 59.0081″
- Apparent magnitude (V): 2.29 - 2.31

Characteristics
- Spectral type: B1 III
- U−B color index: −0.92
- B−V color index: −0.22
- Variable type: β Cep

Astrometry
| Radial velocity (R_{v}) | +3.0 km/s |
| Proper motion (μ) | RA: −15.30 mas/yr Dec.: −11.72 mas/yr |
| Parallax (π) | 7.63±0.48 mas |
| Distance | 430 ± 30 ly (131 ± 8 pc) |
| Absolute magnitude (M_{V}) | −3.29 |

Details
| Mass | 8.2 M_{☉} |
| Radius | 5.8 R_{☉} |
| Luminosity | 16,137 L_{☉} |
| Surface gravity (log g) | 3.88 cgs |
| Temperature | 24,937 K |
| Metallicity [Fe/H] | −0.14±0.10 dex |
| Rotational velocity (v sin i) | 140 km/s |
| Age | 16.3 Myr |

Other designations
- ε Cen, CPD−52°6655, FK5 504, HD 118716, HIP 66657, HR 5132, SAO 241047

Database references
| SIMBAD | data |

Epsilon Centauri is a star in the southern constellation of Centaurus. Its name is a Bayer designation that is Latinized from ε Centauri, and abbreviated Epsilon Cen or ε Cen. This is one of the brightest stars in the constellation with a slightly variable apparent visual magnitude of +2.30. Parallax measurements put it at a distance of around 430 light-years (130 parsecs) from Earth.

In Chinese, 南門 (Nán Mén), meaning Southern Gate, refers to an asterism consisting of ε Centauri and α Centauri. Consequently, the Chinese name for ε Centauri itself is 南門一 (Nán Mén yī, English: the First Star of Southern Gate.)

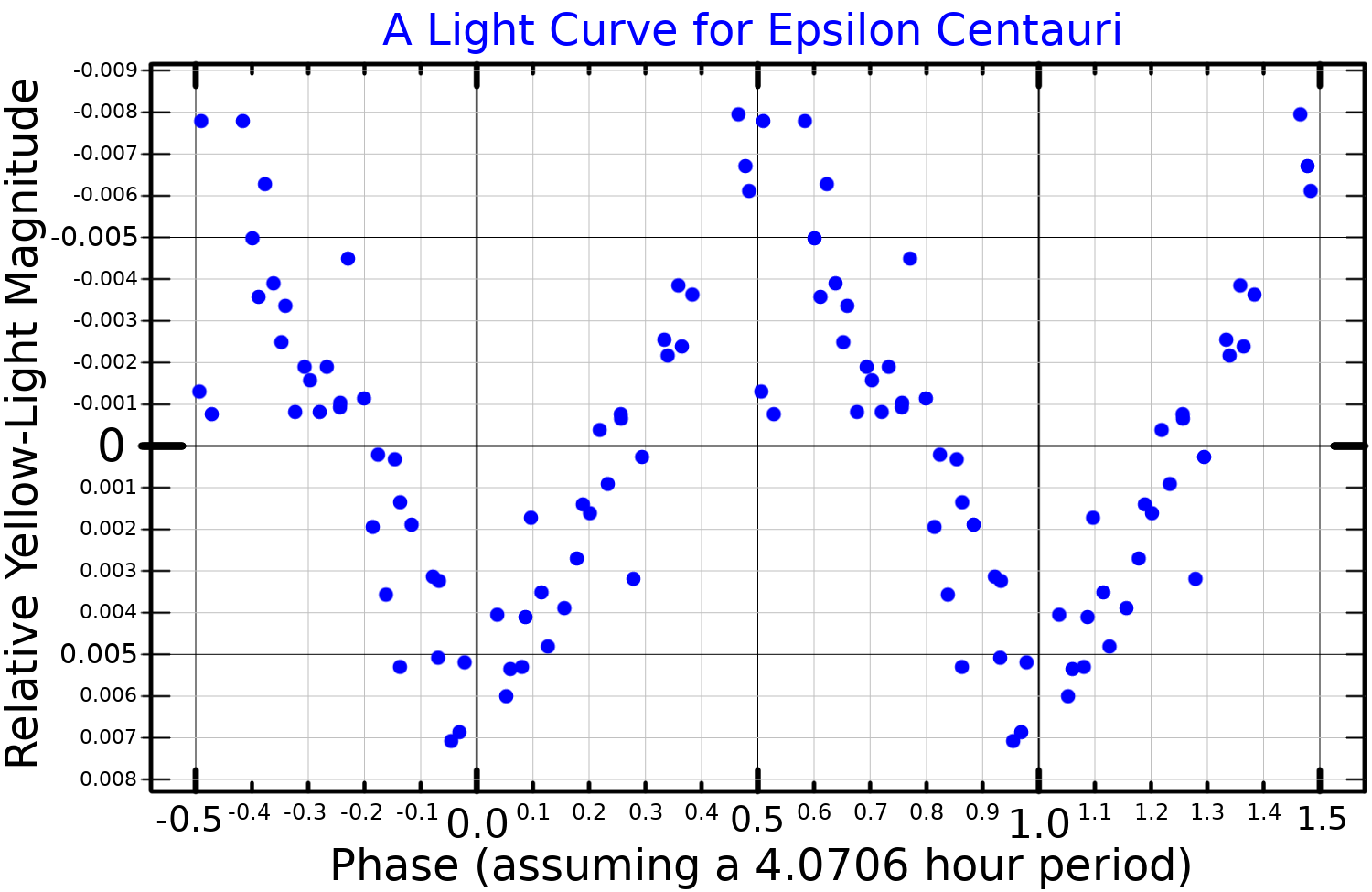
A yellow-light light curve for Epsilon Centauri, adapted from Shobbrook (1972)

ε Centauri is a massive star with 8.2 times the mass of the Sun. The spectrum matches a stellar classification of B1 III, indicating this is an evolved giant star. It is radiating more than 16,000 times the luminosity of the Sun from its outer atmosphere at an effective temperature of about 25,000 K, giving it the blue-white hue of a B-type star. It is classified as a Beta Cephei type variable star with a primary period of 0.16961 days (4 hours 4 minutes), completing 5.9 cycles per day. During each cycle, the brightness of the star varies from apparent magnitude +2.29 to +2.31.

This star is a proper motion member of the Lower Centaurus–Crux sub-group in the Scorpius–Centaurus OB association, the nearest such association of co-moving massive stars to the Sun. Epsilon Centauri is a relatively young star, with an age of around 16 million years.

The IAU has not assigned a proper name to this star.
