= Lambda Centauri =

Star in the constellation Centaurus

λ Centauri
- Location of λ Centauri, circled, lower right

Observation data Epoch J2000.0 Equinox J2000.0
- Constellation: Centaurus
- Right ascension: 11^{h} 35^{m} 46.878^{s}
- Declination: −63° 01′ 11.41″
- Apparent magnitude (V): +3.13

Characteristics
- Spectral type: B9 III
- U−B color index: −0.19
- B−V color index: −0.04

Astrometry
Radial velocity (R_{v})	−1.4 km/s
Proper motion (μ)	RA: −33.863 mas/yr Dec.: −7.236 mas/yr
Parallax (π)	8.2770±0.2537 mas
Distance	390 ± 10 ly (121 ± 4 pc)
Absolute magnitude (M_{V})	−2.35

Details
Mass	4.5 M_{☉}
Radius	5.5 R_{☉}
Luminosity	739 L_{☉}
Surface gravity (log g)	3.04 cgs
Temperature	9,880 K
Metallicity [Fe/H]	+0.41 dex
Rotational velocity (v sin i)	183 km/s

Other designations
- λ Cen, lambda Cen, CPD−62°2127, FK5 436, HD 100841, HIP 56561, HR 4467, SAO 251472

Database references
SIMBAD	data

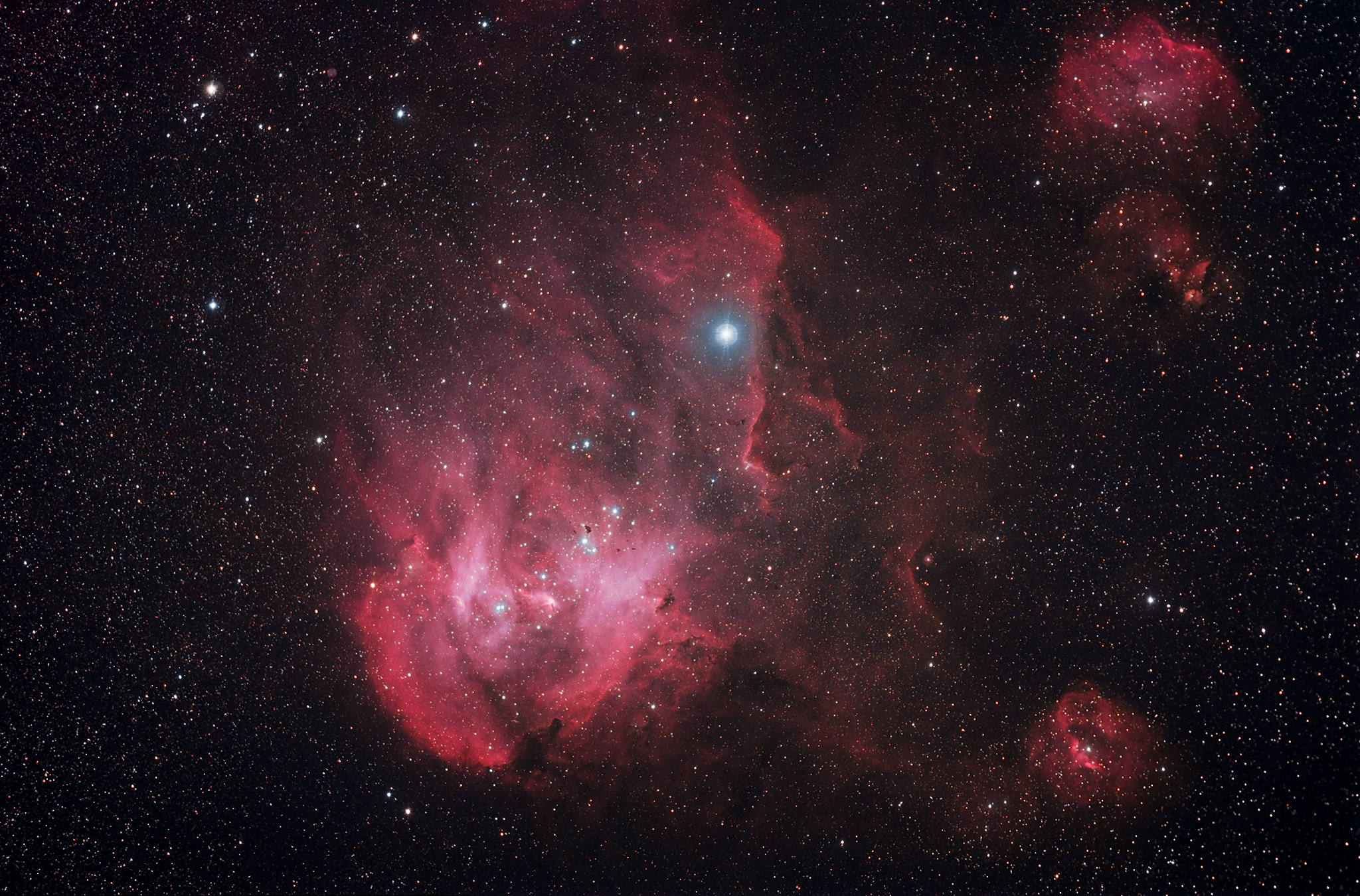
λ Centauri in IC 2944, with IC 2948 below left and IC 2872 above right

Lambda Centauri is a star in the southern circumpolar constellation of Centaurus. Its name is a Bayer designation that is Latinized from λ Centauri, and abbreviated Lambda Cen or λ Cen. The star has an apparent visual magnitude of +3.13, which is bright enough to be seen with the naked eye from the Southern Hemisphere and places it among the brighter members of this constellation. The star is close enough that its distance can be determined directly using the parallax technique, which gives a value of approximately 390 light years (121 pc) from the Sun. Although a putative solitary star, it has a candidate proper motion companion at an angular separation of 0.73 arcseconds along a position angle of 135°. The nebula IC 2944 lies nearby.

Lambda Centauri is a B-type giant star with a stellar classification of B9 III (although it has also been classified as A1 III). It has about 5.5 times the radius of the Sun and is rotating rapidly with a projected rotational velocity of 183 km/s. The latter is giving the star an oblate shape with an equatorial bulge that is 17% larger than the polar radius. The star's outer atmosphere has an effective temperature of 9,880 K, giving it a blue-white hue.

Based upon the position and movement of this star through space, it is a likely member of the Gould Belt. In particular, it belongs to the Lower Centaurus–Crux (LCC) group of the Scorpius–Centaurus association, which is the nearest OB association to the Sun. This is a loose grouping of stars that share a common motion through space and therefore formed in the same molecular cloud. The LCC group has an estimated age of 16–20 million years and is centered on a mean distance of 380 light-years (120 parsecs) from Earth.

== Gallery ==
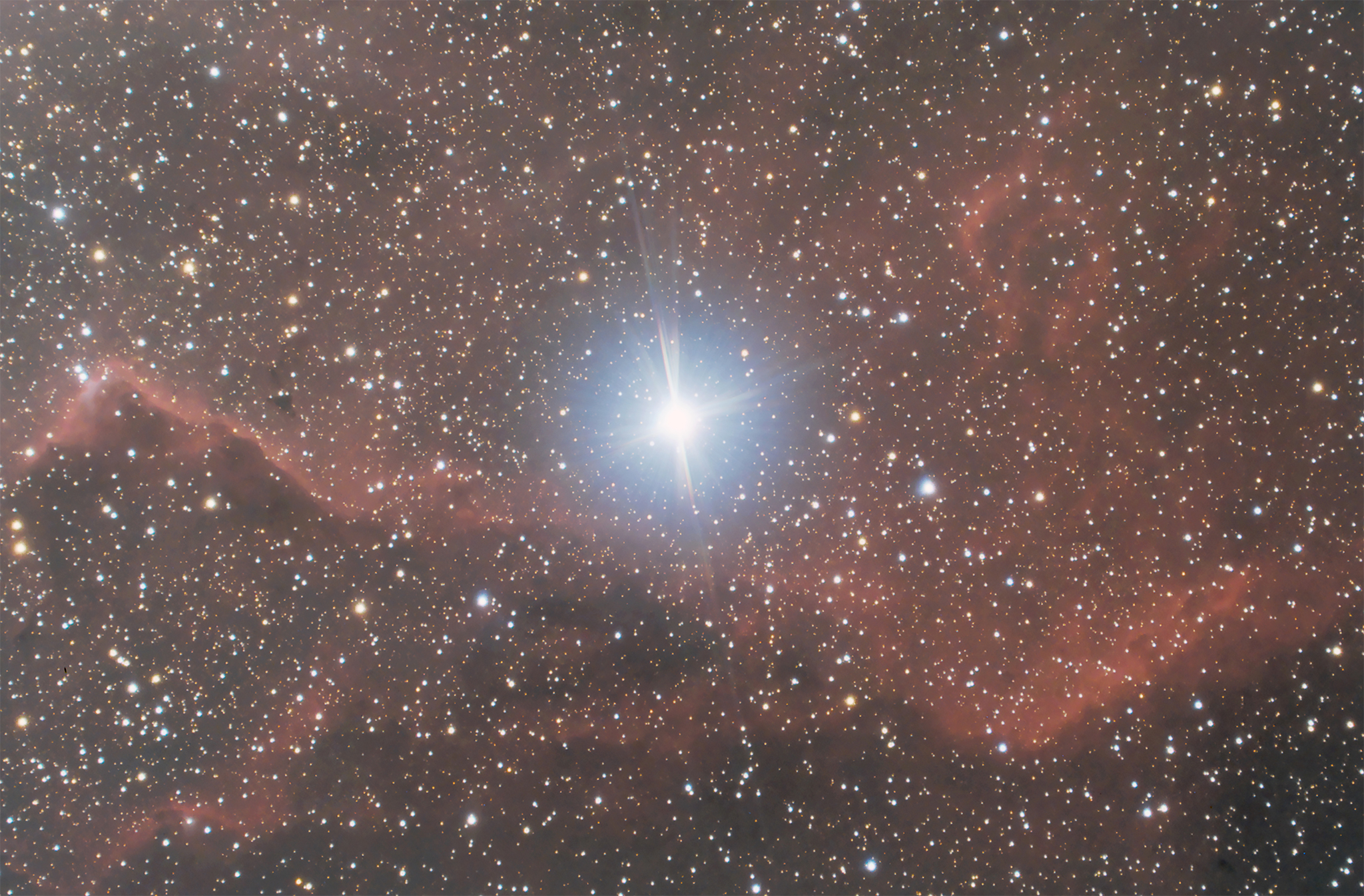
Lambda Centauri and surrounding nebula IC 2944

Crux with λ Centauri (top) and its associated nebulosity visible
