= 13 Scorpii =

Star in the constellation Scorpius

- Location of 13 Scorpii (circled in red)

Observation data Epoch J2000 Equinox ICRS
- Constellation: Scorpius
- Right ascension: 16^{h} 12^{m} 18.20490^{s}
- Declination: −27° 55′ 34.9457″
- Apparent magnitude (V): +4.568

Characteristics
- Spectral type: B2V
- U−B color index: −0.74
- B−V color index: −0.16

Astrometry
Radial velocity (R_{v})	0 ± 5 km/s
Proper motion (μ)	RA: −10.38 mas/yr Dec.: −23.94 mas/yr
Parallax (π)	6.81±0.16 mas
Distance	480 ± 10 ly (147 ± 3 pc)
Absolute magnitude (M_{V})	−1.25

Orbit
Period (P)	5.7805 d
Eccentricity (e)	0.19
Periastron epoch (T)	JD 2443298.40
Argument of periastron (ω) (secondary)	115°
Semi-amplitude (K_{1}) (primary)	31.5 km/s

Details

13 Sco A
Mass	7.80 M_{☉}
Luminosity	3020 L_{☉}
Temperature	24000 K
Rotational velocity (v sin i)	165 km/s
Age	11 Myr

13 Sco B
Mass	1.12 M_{☉}

Other designations
- c^{2} Sco, 13 Sco, CD−27°10841, HD 145482, HIP 79404, HR 6028, SAO 184221

Database references
SIMBAD	data

13 Scorpii, also known by its Bayer designation c^{2} Scorpii, is a binary star in the constellation Scorpius. Its apparent magnitude is 4.57, meaning it can be faintly seen with the naked eye. Based on parallax estimates made by the Hipparcos spacecraft, the system is located about 480 light-years (147 parsecs) away. It is located within the Upper Scorpius subgroup of the Scorpius–Centaurus association.

13 Scorpii is a spectroscopic binary, meaning the two stars are too close to be individually resolved, but periodic Doppler shifts in the star's spectrum indicate there must be orbital motion. In this case, light from only one of its stars can be detected and it is a double-lined spectroscopic binary. The two have an orbital period of 5.7805 days and an eccentricity of 0.19. The primary star, at 11 million years old, is a B-type main-sequence star with a spectral type of B2V. While the primary's mass is estimated to be about 7.8 M_{☉}, its companion is thought to have a mass of 1.12 M_{☉}.
