= Psi2 Lupi =

Star in the constellation Lupus

Psi^{2} Lupi
- Location of ψ^{2} Lupi (circled in red)

Observation data Epoch J2000.0 Equinox J2000.0 (ICRS)
- Constellation: Lupus
- Right ascension: 15^{h} 42^{m} 41.02206^{s}
- Declination: −34° 42′ 37.4617″
- Apparent magnitude (V): 4.75

Characteristics
- Spectral type: B5 V
- U−B color index: −0.570
- B−V color index: −0.146
- Variable type: Microvariable

Astrometry
| Radial velocity (R_{v}) | +3.9±2.8 km/s |
| Proper motion (μ) | RA: −21.37 mas/yr Dec.: −29.98 mas/yr |
| Parallax (π) | 8.97±0.27 mas |
| Distance | 360 ± 10 ly (111 ± 3 pc) |
| Absolute magnitude (M_{V}) | −1.44 |

Orbit
| Period (P) | 12.26 d |
| Eccentricity (e) | 0.19 |
| Periastron epoch (T) | 2438252.97 ± 10.0 JD |
| Argument of periastron (ω) (secondary) | 82.8° |
| Semi-amplitude (K_{1}) (primary) | 63.3 km/s |
| Semi-amplitude (K_{2}) (secondary) | 66.4 km/s |

Details
| Surface gravity (log g) | 4.29 cgs |
| Temperature | 15,135 K |

Other designations
- ψ^{2} Lup, 4 Lup, CD−34°10494, HD 140008, HIP 76945, HR 5839, SAO 206889

Database references
| SIMBAD | data |

Psi^{2} Lupi (ψ^{2} Lup) is a triple star system in the constellation Lupus. It is visible to the naked eye with an apparent magnitude of 4.75. Based upon an annual parallax shift of 8.97 mas as seen from Earth, it is located around 360 light years from the Sun. At that distance, the visual magnitude is diminished by an extinction factor of 0.016±0.009 due to interstellar dust. This system is a member of the Upper Centaurus–Lupus subgroup of the Scorpius–Centaurus association.

The inner pair of stars in this system form a double-lined spectroscopic binary with an orbital period of 12.26 days and an eccentricity of 0.19. The two components are described as similar in appearance. They have the spectrum of a B-type main sequence star with a stellar classification of B5 V. The luminosity has a micro-variability with a frequency of 0.94483 cycles per day and an amplitude of 0.0067 in magnitude. The third component is a magnitude 10 star at an angular separation of 0.51 arc seconds.

== See also ==
- ψ^{1} Lupi
