= Scorpius–Centaurus association =

Nearest OB association to Earth

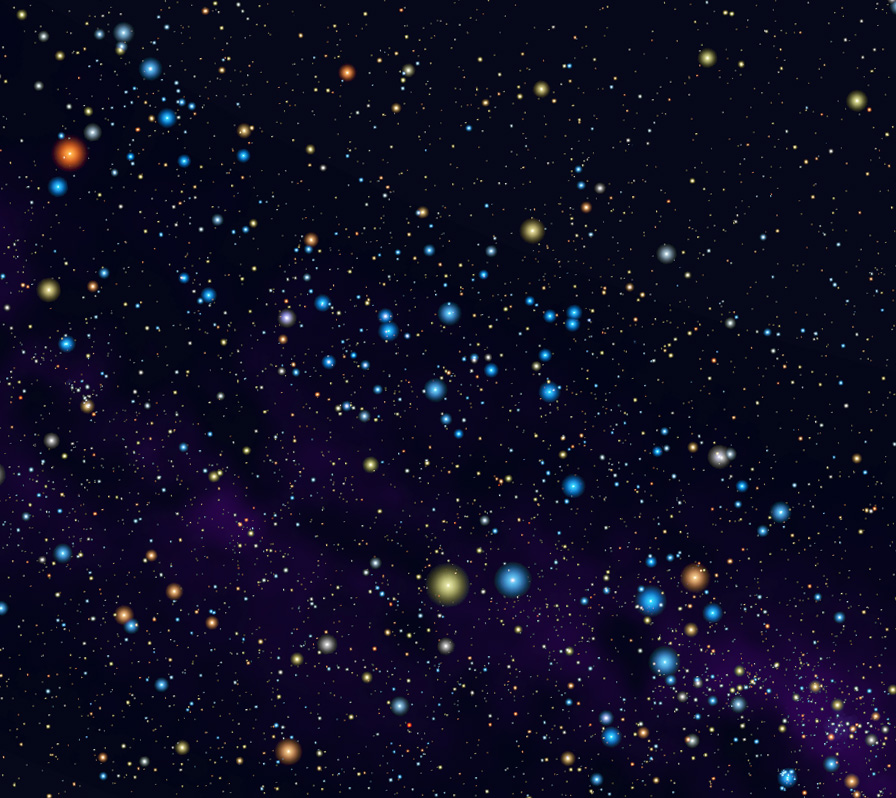
- Scorpius–Centaurus association

Observation data (J2000 epoch)
- Constellation: Scorpius; Lupus; Centaurus; Crux; Musca
- Right ascension: 16^{h} 15^{m} 0.00^{s}
- Declination: −24° 11′ 60.0″
- Mean distance: 420 ly (130 pc)
- Radial velocity: −4.1 km/s

Physical characteristics
- Subgroups: Upper Scorpius, Upper Centaurus–Lupus, Lower Centaurus–Crux
- Other designations: Sco–Cen, Sco OB2

The Scorpius–Centaurus association (also known as Sco–Cen or Sco OB2) is the closest OB association to the Solar System, composed of three subgroups (Upper Scorpius, Upper Centaurus–Lupus, and Lower Centaurus–Crux) and located at a distance of 420 light-years (130 parsecs) from the Sun. Analysis using improved Hipparcos data has brought the number of known members to 436. The cluster shows a continuous spread of stars with no apparent need for subclassification.

The Sco–Cen subgroups range in age from 11 million years (Upper Scorpius) to roughly 15 million years (Upper Centaurus–Lupus and Lower Centaurus–Crux). Many of the bright stars in the constellations of Scorpius, Lupus, Centaurus, and Crux are in fact the brightest members of the Sco–Cen association, including the red supergiant star Antares (the most massive member of Upper Scorpius), and most of the stars in the Southern Cross. The total stellar population in each of the three subgroups is probably of the order 1000–2000, and the total number of stars in the association exceeds 10,000.

The stellar members of the Sco–Cen association have convergent proper motions of approximately 0.02–0.04 arcseconds per year, indicating that the stars have nearly parallel velocity vectors, moving at about 20 km/s with respect to the Sun. The dispersion of the velocities within the subgroups are only of order 1–2 km/s, and the group is most likely gravitationally unbound. Several supernovae have exploded in Sco–Cen over the past 15 million years, leaving a network of expanding gas superbubbles around the group, including the Loop I Bubble.

To it has been hypothesized that a nearby supernova, possibly a member of Sco–Cen, exploded in the Sun's vicinity roughly 3 million years ago, causing the Pliocene–Pleistocene boundary marine extinction and leaving radioactive ^{60}Fe in deep ocean ferromanganese crusts and in biogenic magnetite crystals within Pacific Ocean sediments. However, other findings cite the distance at which this supernova occurred at more than 100 parsec, maintaining that it is not likely not to have contributed to this extinction through the mechanism of what is known as an ultra-violet B (UV-B) catastrophe. In 2019, researchers found interstellar iron in Antarctica which they relate to the Local Interstellar Cloud, which might have been formed near the Sco-Cen association.

== Observation ==
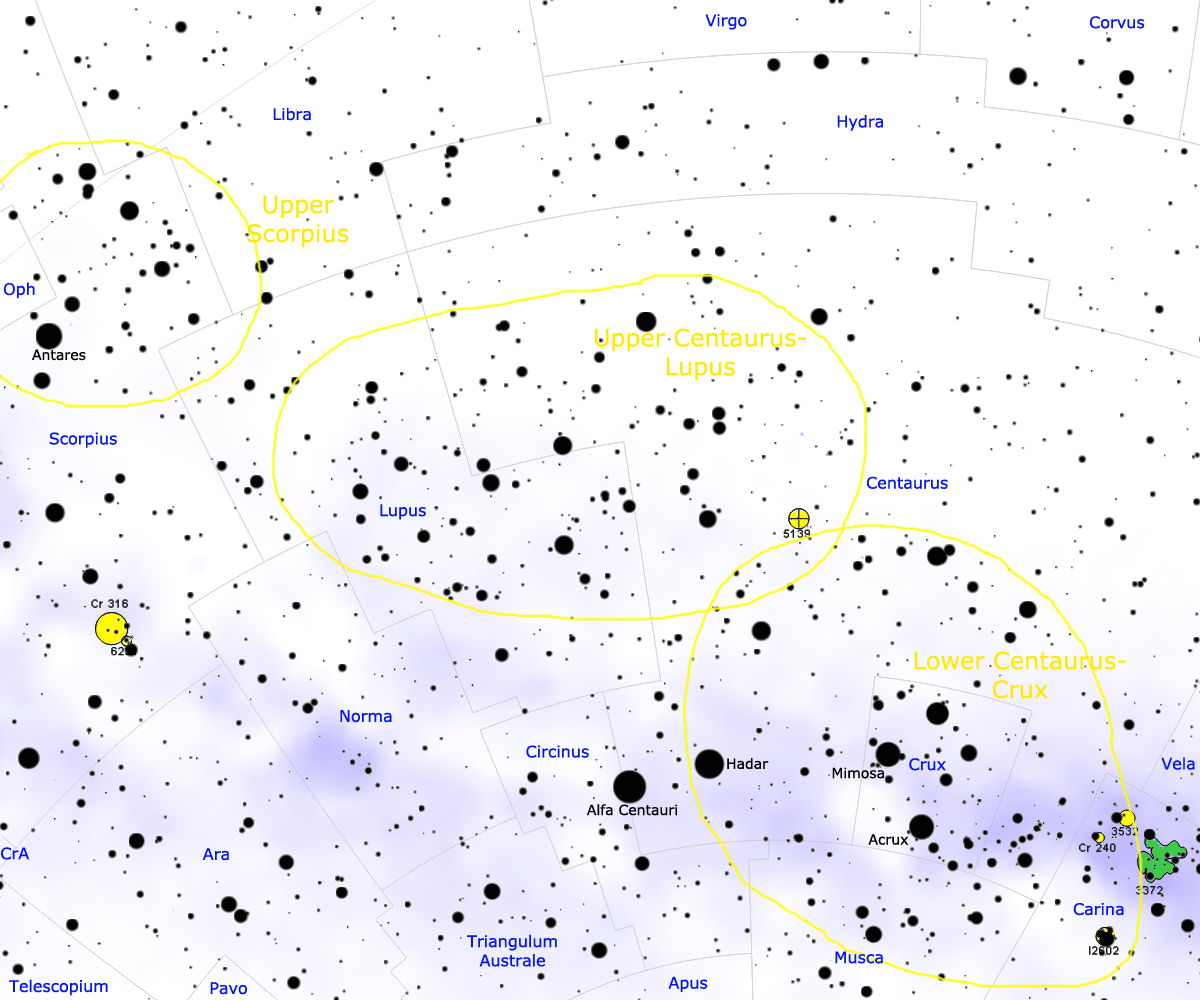
Map of the area containing stars of the Scorpius–Centaurus association

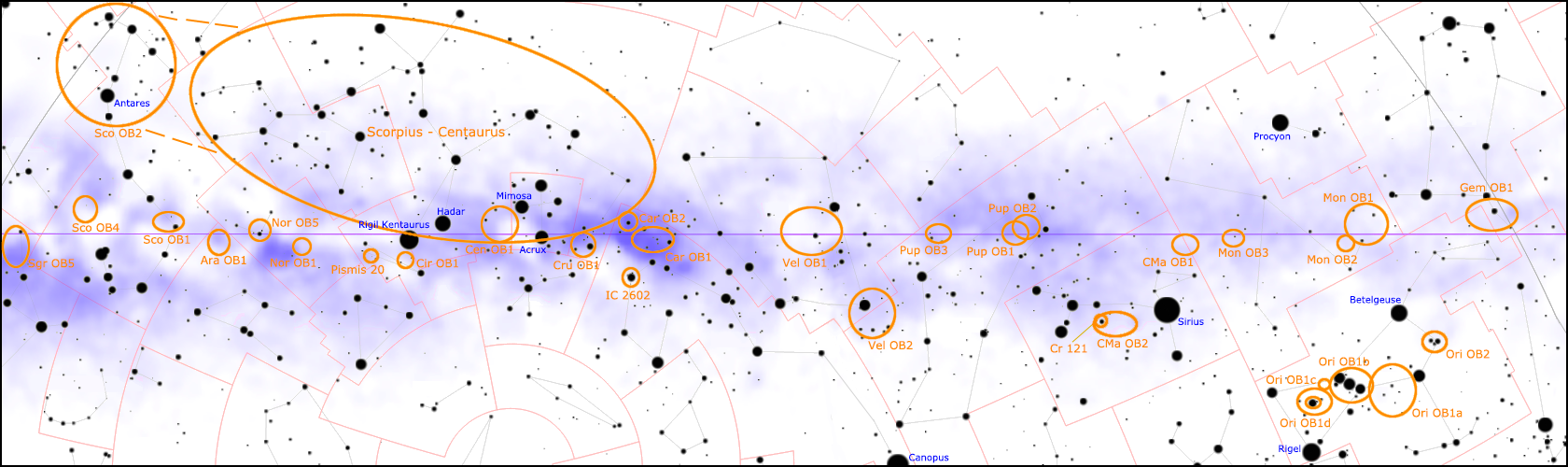
Main associations of the Solar antapex half of the galactic plane, with Sco-Cen on the left

The Scorpius-Centaurus Association is one of the most conspicuous and easily recognizable galactic structures in the entire celestial vault, as well as, in terms of apparent size, the largest OB association visible from Earth. It extends for over fifty degrees and includes a large number of very bright blue stars, whose apparent magnitudes can reach first magnitude, making them visible even from the centers of large cities. Generally speaking, it can be said that almost all the bright stars that make up the constellations of Lupus, the northern part of Scorpius, Centaurus and the Southern Cross belong to this association; only a few stars are exceptions, such as Alpha Centauri, Gacrux, Theta Centauri and Iota Centauri, which appear in this region of the sky only due to visual perspective, as they are located in the foreground with respect to the association. The association appears tangent to the luminous trail of the Milky Way, inclined, with respect to it, by more than 20°.

The Scorpius-Centaurus Association lies entirely in the Southern Celestial Hemisphere. The northernmost part, coinciding with the Antares region, lies at an average declination of −23° and is visible without excessive difficulty—even from much of the Northern Hemisphere. The central segments, coinciding with the constellations of Lupus and Northern Centaurus, lie on average at 40°S and can only be observed from lower temperate, Mediterranean, and subtropical latitudes. The southern section extends into the southernmost part of Centaurus and the Southern Cross, until it touches Musca and ends in Carina with the bright open cluster of IC 2602 (the Southern Pleiades). The southern section is only easily observable from tropical regions, and it is no coincidence that from the Southern Hemisphere it appears to be circumpolar and extend throughout the extratropical belt.

Due to its wide extension across the starry sky, a complete and clear view of the association can only be obtained from regions in the Southern Hemisphere, where the portion of the Milky Way affected by its presence, which coincides with the southernmost part, appears high on the horizon. Global views are also possible north of the equator, in the lower tropical zone, provided the southern horizon is completely clear of obstacles. The ideal time for its observation in the evening hours is between March and June, its presence high in the sky during southern nights indicates the advance of the autumn season, while in the Northern Hemisphere, the northern parts of Centaurus and Scorpius appearing in the southeast indicate the imminent arrival of the summer season.

Due to the precession of the equinoxes, the south celestial pole is slowly moving towards the southwestern part of the association, between the Southern Cross and Carina. Within a few thousand years, when the south celestial pole will point towards the Milky Way and the False Cross asterism, the stars of the Scorpius-Centaurus association will have reached their southernmost point. As the Earth's axis moves away from that region of the sky, the constellations of Scorpius and Centaurus will assume increasingly northerly declinations, until they even move partly north of the celestial equator.

== Characteristics ==
The Scorpius–Centaurus (Sco–Cen) association region exemplifies a medium-scale star formation process, wherein giant molecular clouds produce stars across a broad mass spectrum, before disintegrating under the influence of stellar winds and supernova explosions from its progeny—which accumulate, compact, and erode residual gas and dust to trigger additional, often marginal, star formation episodes. As the most prominent component of a vast complex of recent (<20 million years old) and ongoing star formation, the Sco–Cen OB association encompasses numerous nearby molecular clouds at distances of approximately 120–200 parsecs, including the Rho Ophiuchi, Pipe Nebula, Barnard 68, Chamaeleon, Lupus, Corona Australis, and Coalsack complexes, these peripheral clouds, aligned along the association's inclination relative to the Milky Way, host relatively subdued low-mass star formation and form the edges of the broader Scorpius–Centaurus complex, featuring western structures like the Chamaeleon and Coalsack nebulas, and eastern ones such as the Lupus, Corona Australis, Rho Ophiuchi, and Pipe nebulas, oriented toward the galactic bulge. Surrounding Sco–Cen are several less dense young stellar groups, including the ~3–5 million-year-old Epsilon Chamaeleontis moving group, ~7 million-year-old Eta Chamaeleontis moving group, ~8 million-year-old TW Hydrae association, ~12 million-year-old Beta Pictoris moving group, and possibly the ~30–50 million-year-old IC 2602 open cluster.

The three large subregions of the association are almost completely devoid of interstellar gas, which has been completely swept away. The stars present here also show a very low extinction rate, an indication of low obscuration due to dust. A complex ring-like structure has formed around the association, a low-density bubble whose edges are composed of molecular hydrogen (H I), whose mass is around 300,000 M_{☉} and could coincide with what remains of the large molecular cloud from which the association itself originated.

Compared to other regions of the Galaxy of more or less contemporary origin, the Scorpius-Centaurus association hosts a higher percentage of double or multiple systems, up to a rate 1.16 times higher than the average, and this percentage increases significantly if low-mass pre-main sequence stars, such as red dwarfs, are considered. A study conducted on almost 200 members of the first spectral classes (i.e. the blue-white stars of class B and A) located mainly in the northernmost part of the association, showed the presence of 176 companion stars, of which at least eighty are physically linked to the major stars around which they have been observed. On average, the masses of these minor stellar and substellar components identified vary from 0.03 to 1.2 M_{☉}.

=== Evolution ===
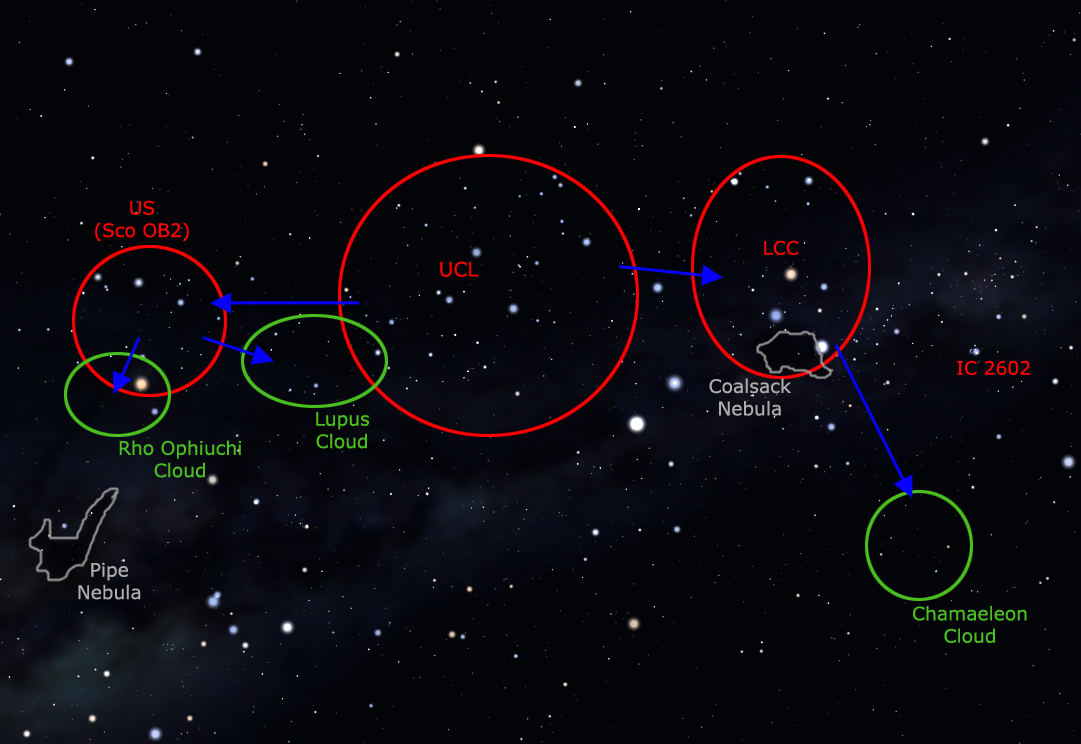
The possible dynamics of the star formation processes that led to the formation of the Scorpius-Centaurus association. Areas where star formation has ceased are shown in red, those where it is still active are shown in green, and inactive clouds are shown in gray

The dynamics that led to the formation of the various subgroups of the association are very complex and partly still unknown. Specifically, the processes that took place in the northern part of the association, visible in the direction of Scorpius, are known, while those that generated the two southernmost subgroups remain almost completely unknown. It is known that the age of the stars in the association increases as one proceeds in a westerly direction, a sign that the oldest star formation phenomena took place mainly in the region occupied by the constellation of Centaurus, it is also known that the stars located north of the galactic equator have a younger age (about 12 million years) than those located to the south (about 17 million years). Furthermore, the southern part appears to be at a distance of 109 parsecs, slightly closer than the northern part, located at 123 parsecs.

According to some very simplified models, star formation would have initially taken place in the northern part of the upper Centaurus-Lupus group, about 17 million years ago, and would have then extended southwards, to the lower Centaurus-Crux group, reaching its peak about 12 million years ago; the new stars would have been initially concentrated in small clusters and filaments surrounded by gas, containing tens or hundreds of stars. The residual gas of the progenitor molecular cloud would have subsequently been swept away by the combined action of the stellar wind and the supernova explosions of the most massive components, which completed their life cycle very quickly. About 6 million years ago these generative processes extended to the clouds located south of the galactic equator, in particular in the regions of the Chameleon Cloud and stars Epsilon and Eta Chamaeleontis.

Starting from 12 million years ago, the bubble formed by the wind of the young stars of the upper Centaurus-Lupus group began its expansion, perhaps further accelerated by the explosion of some supernova at a later time. About 5 million years ago, the expansion front of the bubble generated pressure and compressed the molecular cloud corresponding to the current group of stars that form the head of Scorpius, generating the youngest part of the association, the upper Scorpius group, also catalogued as Scorpius OB2. Through the knowledge of the physical distance between the two groups of the association, equal to about 60 parsecs, it has been calculated that the expansion velocity of this bubble was about 25 km/s.

The burst of star formation in the Northern Scorpius Cloud generated approximately 2,500 stars, including some particularly massive ones with masses exceeding 10 M_{☉}. These stars rapidly evolved and subsequently exploded as supernovae, generating, among others, the pulsar PSR J1932+1059. The powerful shock waves generated by these explosions almost completely swept away the residual gas of the ancient molecular cloud, whose remnants are visible in the delicate filaments known as Sh 2-1 and Sh 2-7. The shock waves also impacted the adjacent Rho Ophiuchi Cloud over the last million years, fueling the intense star formation activity in the region that can still be observed today. The same shock waves may also be responsible for the initiation of stellar genesis phenomena in the Lupus Molecular Cloud, where the oldest stellar components show an age less than 1 million years.

== Structure ==
The Scorpius-Centaurus association is traditionally divided into three groups, which show slightly different ages and characteristics. The northern section is called Upper Scorpius (US) and includes all the blue stars in the northwestern part of Scorpius, including Antares. The central section, the largest, is called Upper Centaurus-Lupus (UCL) and includes almost all the stars of Lupus and most of the northern and central stars of Centaurus. The southernmost part of the association is called Lower Centaurus-Crux (LCC), and lies in the wake of the Milky Way. It includes the southern part of Centaurus, excluding Alpha Centauri, and the Southern Cross, excluding Gacrux. The southwestern edge of the association coincides with the bright cluster of the Southern Pleiades (IC 2602).

=== Upper Scorpius association ===
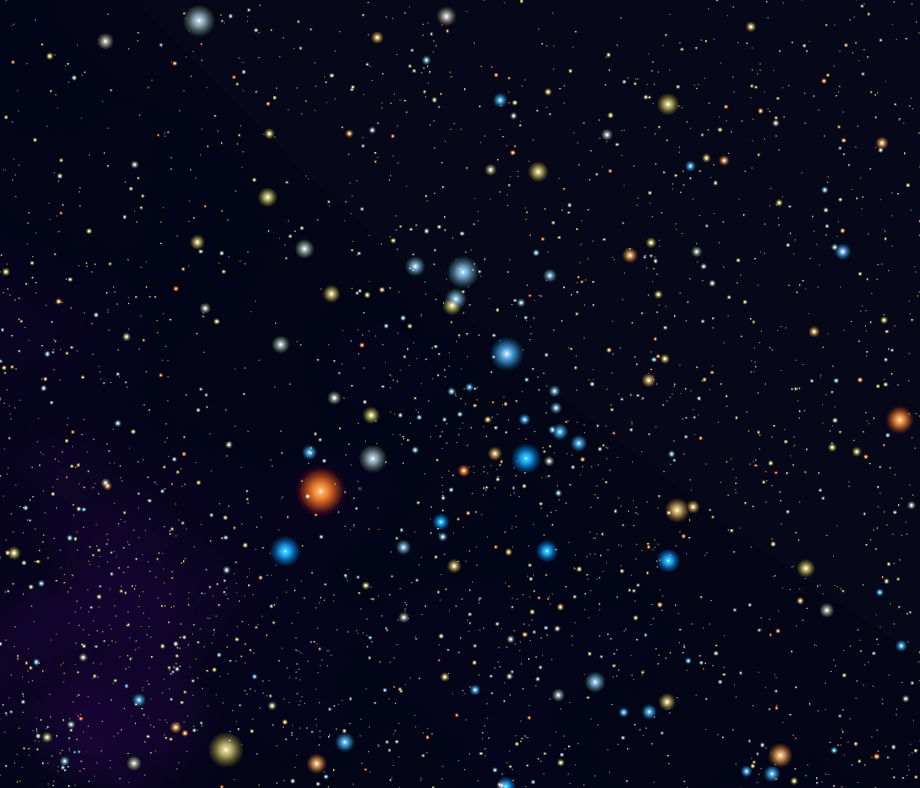
Upper Scorpius association

The Upper Scorpius Association (US) is the youngest part of the Scorpius-Centaurus Association. It formed about 5 million years ago and contains about 120 massive stellar components, dispersed over a 35 parsec region that is about 145 parsecs from the Sun. The spectral class of these components varies between B0.5 and G5, and most of them lie on the main sequence—although there are some stars already in an advanced evolutionary phase, among which the red supergiant Antares (α Scorpii) stands out. Despite the young age of the group, no star formation is currently taking place in the region, which is instead active in the adjacent Rho Ophiuchi cloud. Of the original components, the most massive have already completed their life cycle and exploded as supernovae. The most massive among them was probably the progenitor of the pulsar PSR J1932+1059, which exploded about 1.5 million years ago, and whose original mass was probably around 50 M_{☉}. Although it was speculated that this star was the larger companion of the runaway star Zeta Ophiuchi, subsequent measurements suggest that the two stars were separated from their origin.

In addition to the high-mass stars, several hundred low and medium mass stars, as well as some T Tauri stars, have been discovered. Some of these stars, however, are not physically related to the association, but are part of the Rho Ophiuchi star-forming region. A portion of the low-mass objects may fall into the category of brown dwarfs: their masses are in fact between 0.3 and 0.007 M⊙, and a dozen of these have a mass equal to or less than 15 Jupiter masses.

In December 2021, around 70 new rogue planets were discovered in the Upper Scorpius association.

=== Upper Centaurus-Lupus association ===
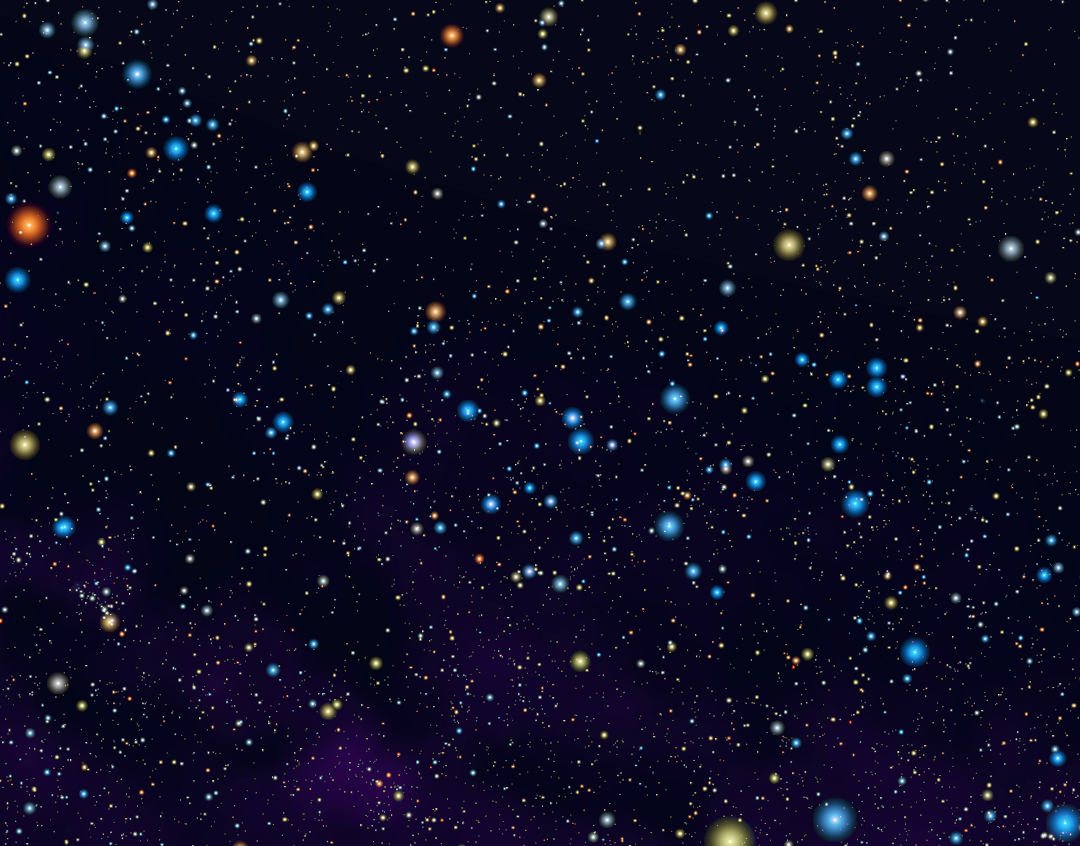
Upper Centaurus-Lupus association

The Upper Centaurus-Lupus association (UCL) constitutes the central body of the association. It includes hundreds of large and medium mass stellar components, many of which are clearly visible even to the naked eye, which make up almost the entire constellation of Lupus and part of Scorpius and Centaurus. Unlike the Upper Scorpius association, the study of this large group of stars is made more difficult by several factors: first, its position much closer to the galactic plane, which makes it more difficult to correctly determine the group's true physical components with respect to the background stars. Added to this is a greater dispersion of its stellar components and the almost total absence of pre-main sequence stars shrouded in nebulosity, due to the group's greater age. Finally, its declination means that it is only clearly visible and able to be studied by observers located at southern or, at least, tropical latitudes. The parallax measurement of the UCL components indicates a distance between approximately 90 and 200 parsecs, this large range is due to the great depth extension of the group itself, therefore some components appear to be closer and others further away.

The most massive components of the group belong to the spectral class B and have an apparent magnitude between 2.0 and 3.5 on average. The easternmost components are found in the central part of Scorpius, including the famous optical pair formed by the stars Mu¹ and Mu² Scorpii, and the most massive components of the group, Alpha and Beta Lupi. These are mostly blue giants and blue subgiants, and, unlike the upper Scorpius group, there are no components of the lower spectral classes. This absence can be explained by the older age of the upper Centaurus-Lupus group, estimated at around 17 million years: the most massive components originally part of the group have already exploded as supernovae. The supernova remnants associated with these explosions coincide with a large expanding superbubble with a diameter of 200 parsecs, the edges of which are clearly visible in the neutral hydrogen (HI) band. The powerful shock wave generated by the explosions, combined with the action of the stellar wind of the hottest stars in the group, has completely dissolved the original molecular cloud that generated them.

The population of low-mass stars was detected largely in the late 1990s, when the launch of the ROSAT satellite allowed the study of the sky in X-rays, and attention was concentrated on the Lupus Cloud, adjacent to the UCL group. In this region, 136 stars with characteristics similar to T Tauri stars were identified in 1997. The stars identified in this region show different ages depending on their position: the stars scattered outside the cloud are older than those known inside it. This difference in age, 5-27 million years for the older stars and 1 million years for the younger, shows that these belong to two distinct stellar populations, and originate from different molecular clouds.

The low and medium mass stellar components of class G and K (yellow dwarfs, like the Sun, and orange dwarfs), mostly in the pre-main sequence phase, show a large amount of lithium. Based on the study of more than fifty of these components, an average age of between 15 and 22 million years has been determined.

=== Lower Centaurus-Crux association ===
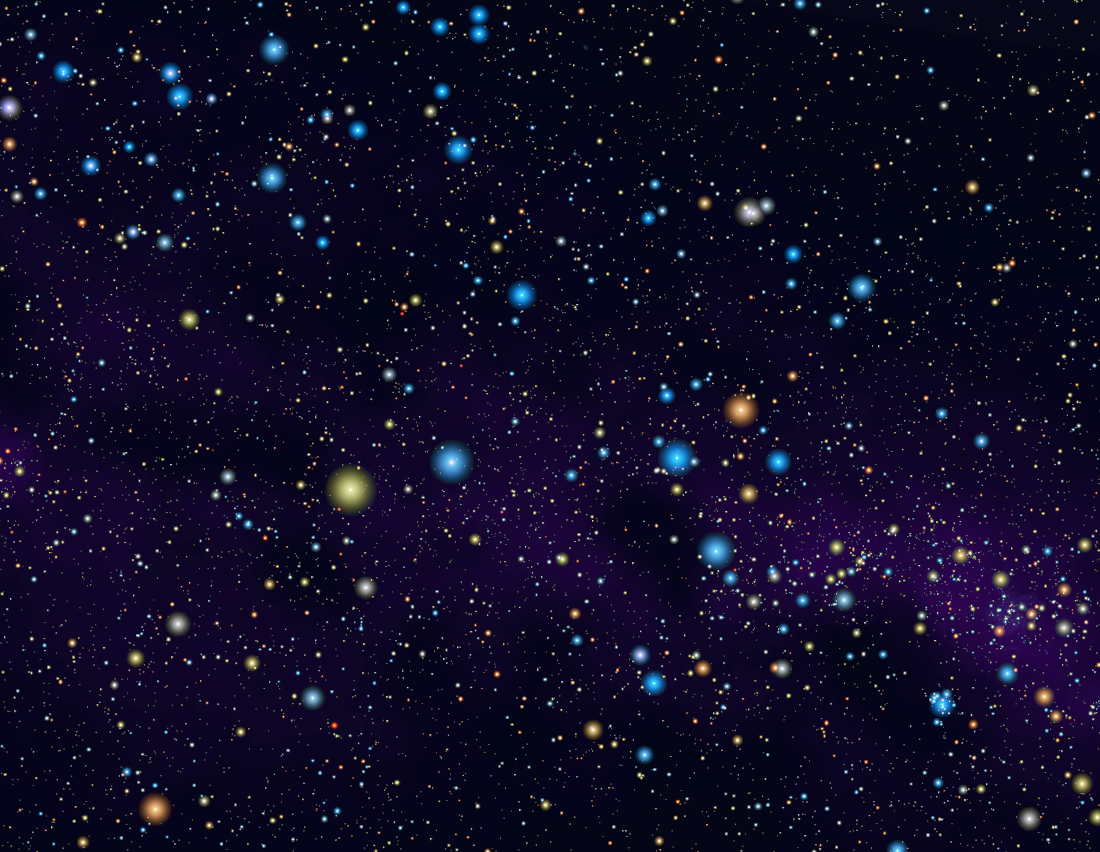
Lower Centaurus-Crux association

The Lower Centaurus-Crux association (LCC) is the least known and studied part of the Scorpius-Centaurus Association, although it is also the closest: its distance is estimated to be around 118 parsecs. It extends in the southwestern part of Centaurus and occupies the area of sky in the direction of the Southern Cross and the Fly, until it reaches the northeastern edge of Carina. The age of the stars in the group vary according to their position. The components in the northeastern part, the closest to the UCL group, have an age of about 17 million years, very similar to that of the central group. The more southern components have a younger age, equal to about 12 million years; this reveals that the star formation phenomena extended from north to south.

The northern part has a higher density than the southern part, which appears more dispersed. Among the higher-mass components, several are clearly visible even to the naked eye and appear as very bright stars. These include six very massive stars, referred to as the "super Cen-Cru six", namely Hadar, one of the brightest stars in the sky, halfway between the lower and central group, Acrux, Mimosa, Delta, Epsilon and Rho Centauri. Other easily observed stars include Gamma Centauri, Alpha and Beta Muscae. However, some of these stars show anomalies in their proper motion, and their exact membership in the association is still a matter of study. The southwestern edge is represented by the open cluster IC 2602. Among the massive components there are two Herbig Ae/Be stars, catalogued with the acronyms HD 100546 and HD 100453, of sixth and seventh magnitude respectively, with ages around 10 million years. HD 100453, seems to have a red pre-main sequence companion (class M), although its presence has not been confirmed spectroscopically.

The group contains about 120 low-mass stellar components, whose magnitudes are between the eighth and eleventh magnitude. These are mostly main sequence, pre-main sequence, and T Tauri stars belonging to the G and K classes (yellow and orange), identified through various studies conducted since the nineties through observations made using the ROSAT satellite.

== Members stars and Exoplanets ==
Almost all bright stars in Constellation of Scorpius, Centaurus, Lupus and Crux are members of Scorpius-Centaurus association.

The Scorpius–Centaurus association contains the youngest transiting exoplanets: K2-33 b (11 Myrs), TOI-1227 b (11 Myrs) and HIP 67522 b (17 Myrs). It also contains directly imaged exoplanets such as UScoCTIO 108 b and the PDS 70 system.

Name (Designation)	Distance (ly)	Stellar classification	Apparent magnitude	Note
Upper Scorpius association
Antares (Alpha Scorpii)	550	M1.5Iab-Ib	0.6–1.6	
Antares (Alpha Scorpii)	550	B2.5V	0.6–1.6	
Delta Scorpii (Dschubba)	470	B0.3 IV	1.59 - 2.32	
Delta Scorpii (Dschubba)	470	B1-3V	1.59 - 2.32	
Beta¹ Scorpii (Acrab)	400 ± 40	B0.5IV-V	2.62	
Beta¹ Scorpii (Acrab)	400 ± 40	B1.5V	2.62	
Mu¹ Scorpii (Xamidimura)	500	B1.5 V	2.94 - 3.22	
Mu¹ Scorpii (Xamidimura)	500	B6.5 V	2.94 - 3.22	
Mu² Scorpii (Pipirima)	474 ± 8	B2 IV	3.56	
Upper Centaurus-Lupus association
Alpha Lupi (Uridim)	460 ± 10	B1.5 III	2.30	
Eta Centauri	306 ± 6	B1.5 Vne	2.35	
Beta Lupi	383 ± 8	B2 III	2.68	
Gamma Lupi	420 ± 30	B2 IV	2.77	
Kappa Centauri AB	400 ± 20	B2V	3.14	
Kappa Centauri AB	400 ± 20	B3V	3.14	
Delta Lupi	900	B1.5 IV	3.20 - 3.24	
Epsilon Lupi	510	B2 IV-V	3.41	
Eta Lupi	440 ± 10	B2 IV	3.41	
Eta Lupi	440 ± 10	A5 Vp	3.41	
Eta Lupi	440 ± 10	F5 V	3.41	
Nu Centauri (Heng)	437 ± 10	B2 IV	3.41	
Mu Centauri	510 ± 10	B2V:e	3.42	
Iota Lupi	338 ± 7	B2.5 IV	3.54	
Phi Centauri	530 ± 10	B2 IV	3.745	
Lower Centaurus-Crux association
Acrux (Alpha Crucis)	320 ± 20	B0.5IV	0.76	
Acrux (Alpha Crucis)	320 ± 20	B1V	0.76	
Beta Centauri (Hadar)	361 ± 2	B1 III	0.61	
Beta Centauri (Hadar)	361 ± 2	B1 III	0.61	
Beta Centauri (Hadar)	361 ± 2	B1V	0.61	
Mimosa (Beta Crucis)	280 ± 20	B0.5 III	1.25	
Epsilon Centauri	430 ± 30	B1 III	2.30	
Delta Centauri	410 ± 20	B2Vne or B2 IVne	2.57	
Alpha Muscae	315 ± 3	B2 IV–V	2.69	
Delta Crucis (Imai)	345 ± 5	B2 IV	2.78 - 2.84	
Beta Muscae	340 ± 10	B2 V	3.05	
Beta Muscae	340 ± 10	B3 V	3.05	
Lambda Centauri	390 ± 10	B9 III	3.13	
Pi Centauri	360 ± 10	B5Vn	3.90	
Pi Centauri	360 ± 10	B6V	3.90	
Sigma Centauri	412 ± 9	B3 V	3.91	
Upsilon¹ Centauri	427 ± 9	B2 IV/V	3.87	
Rho Centauri	276 ± 9	B3 V	3.97	

== Galactic environment ==
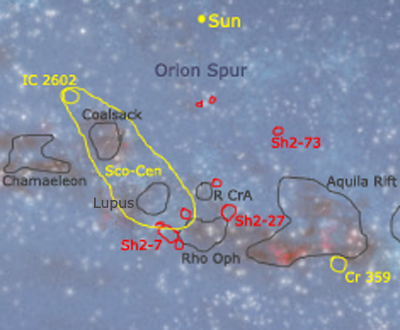
Close up on the Orion Arm, with major stellar associations (yellow), nebulae (red) and dark nebulae (grey) coreward from the Local Bubble with Sco-Cen

The Scorpius-Centaurus association is located on the inner edge of the Orion Arm and is part of a large ring of young stars called the Gould Belt, which groups together several OB associations, including Vela OB2, Orion OB1, Perseus OB2 and Lacerta OB1. With respect to the Sun, the Sco-Cen association coincides with the closest part of this ring.

Other small star groups that show a similar age to each other are linked to the association, including the TW Hydrae association, the Beta Pictoris association and the Eta Chamaeleontis association. All these groups, although they are found in the proximity of the association, are not in physical contact with it. Their proper motion indicates that they are moving away from it, so they were once found in the same region. One theory suggests that these groups, now isolated and dispersed, were formed together with the association, but in the peripheral regions of the large molecular cloud from which the stars of the UCL group were also born.

TW Hydrae is among the star groups closest to the solar system, located at a distance of 50 parsecs. It is a group of young stars, approximately 16 million years old, which, thanks to its proximity, is of great importance in the study of the accretion phenomena that accompany the formation of stars and planets; many of its stars, in fact, are surrounded by protoplanetary disks and their current evolutionary phase is considered crucial for the subsequent formation of planets. Among its components is the young brown dwarf 2M1207, famous for being the first star around which an extrasolar planet was observed directly from Earth through the 2MASS mapping (2M1207 b).

In the line of sight of the Scorpius-Centaurus association lie several bright stars and objects completely unrelated to it. This includes Alpha Centauri, whose great brightness is due exclusively to the fact that it is the closest star to the Sun, located at only 4 light-years. At about 88 light-years (27 parsecs) away lies Gacrux, a red giant that overlaps with the LCC group. Both stars exhibit a large proper motion in the direction opposite to that of the association, so Alpha Centauri will appear almost superimposed on Hadar within 4000 years, while in a few tens of thousands of years it will find itself outside the boundaries of Centaurus, and Gacrux will follow the same fate. In addition to these stars, there are also two nebulae that do not belong to the association, although they are visually aligned with it: The most notable is IC 2944, visible southwest of the Southern Cross, in the direction of the LCC group. It is a large H II region located at about 2000 parsecs in the Sagittarius Arm. The second is the Circinus Cloud, a dense, unilluminated clump of gas with vigorous star formation. Its distance is about 700 parsecs and it is visible just southeast of Alpha Centauri.

== See also ==
- List of nearby stellar associations and moving groups
- β Pictoris moving group
- Ursa Major Moving Group
