= RU Lupi =

Star in the constellation of Lupus

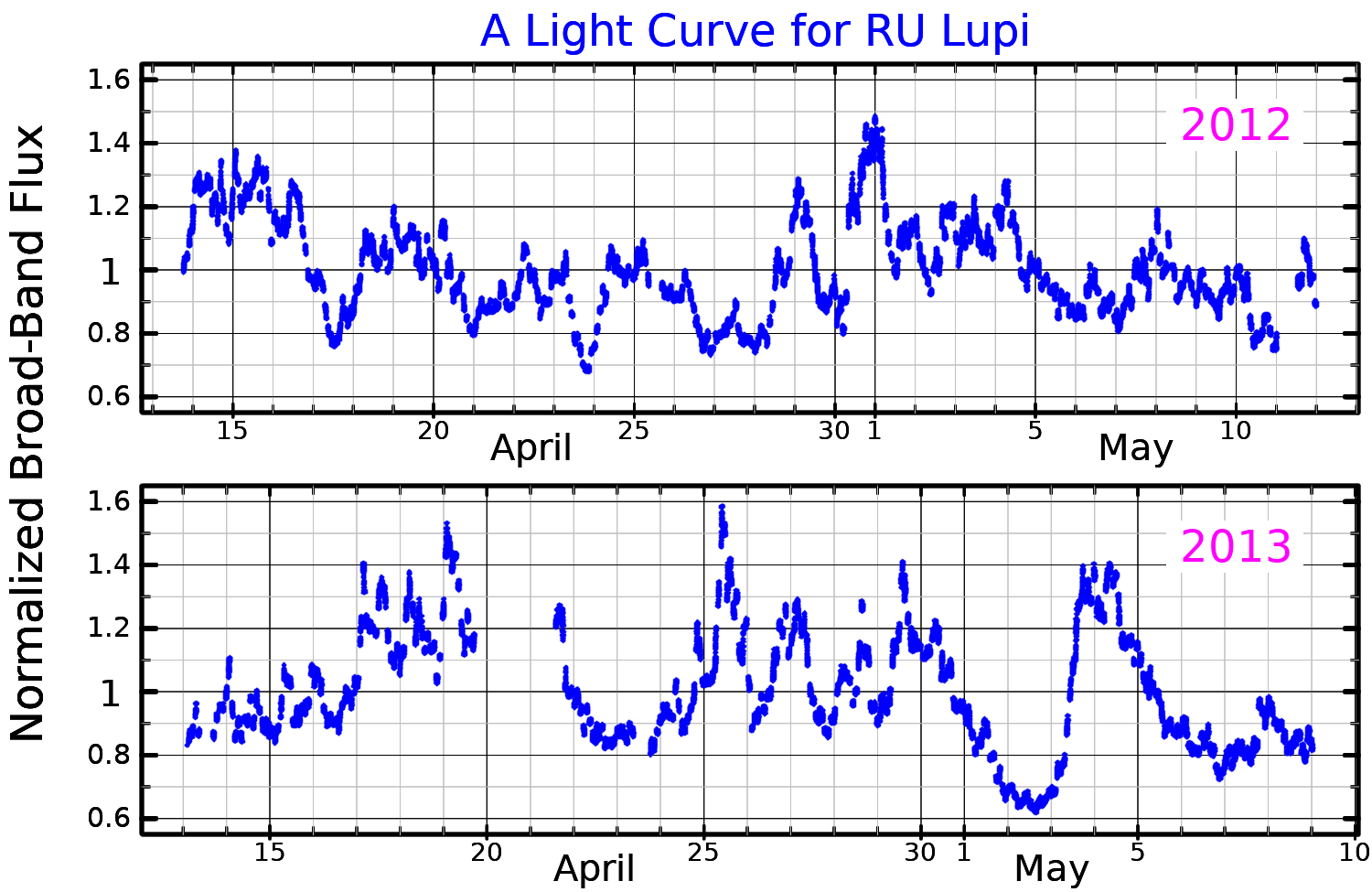
- A broad-band optical light curve for RU Lupi, adapted from Siwak et al. (2016)

Observation data Epoch J2000.0 Equinox J2000.0
- Constellation: Lupus
- Right ascension: 15^{h} 56^{m} 42.31154^{s}
- Declination: −37° 49′ 15.5021″
- Apparent magnitude (V): 10.519

Characteristics
- Spectral type: K7/M0e
- U−B color index: –0.802
- B−V color index: +0.476
- Variable type: T Tauri-type

Astrometry
Radial velocity (R_{v})	−6.4 km/s
Proper motion (μ)	RA: −10.61 mas/yr Dec.: −26.41 mas/yr
Parallax (π)	6.3489±0.0402 mas
Distance	514 ± 3 ly (157.5 ± 1.0 pc)

Details
Mass	0.6–0.7 M_{☉}
Radius	1.64 R_{☉}
Luminosity	2.1 L_{☉}
Surface gravity (log g)	3.9 cgs
Temperature	3,950 K
Rotational velocity (v sin i)	9 km/s
Age	2–3 Myr

Other designations
- RU Lup, CD−37°10602, HIP 78094, HD 142560

Database references
SIMBAD	data

RU Lupi is a star in the constellation of Lupus, located in the young Lupus Star Forming Region. Based on parallax measurements, the distance to this star is about 514 light-years (158 pc). The apparent visual magnitude is 10.5, so viewing it would require a telescope with an aperture of 6 cm (2 in), but preferably larger.

This is a T Tauri star, which is a stage that a newly formed, low-mass star passes through before settling down onto the main sequence, where it will generate all of its energy through hydrogen fusion at its core. The age of this star is about 2–3 million years. It is showing random fluctuations in luminosity, including variations in ultraviolet and X-ray emissions.

The spectrum of the star is displaying emission lines of hydrogen overlaid on the star's normal spectra. This may be caused by the impact of infalling gas on the star's outer envelope, combined with the signature of a strong outflowing wind near the star. Mass is accreting onto the star at the rate of about (5 ± 2) × 10^{−8} times the mass of the Sun per year.

RU Lupi has an estimated mass of 0.6–0.7 times the mass of the Sun and 1.6 times the Sun's radius. It is radiating more than double the luminosity of the Sun, at an effective temperature of about 3,950 K. RU Lupi is surrounded by a circumstellar disk of dust that has a combined mass of up to 0.032 times the mass of the Sun. The particles in the disk vary in size, but range up to a centimeter in cross-section.

The star exhibits periodic radial velocity variations that are attributed to stellar spots on the surface of the star, based on the correlation between the radial velocity and the bisector inverse slope (a quantity that parametrises the shape of the spectral lines). The time period of the variations makes it unlikely that they are caused by stellar pulsations as these would be expected to occur on much shorter timescales (hours rather than days), and the correlation with the bisector inverse slope makes it unlikely that an orbiting companion is responsible as reflex motion would not cause the line profile variations.
