= Eta Chamaeleontis =

Star in the constellation Chamaeleon

- Location of η Chamaeleontis (circled)

Observation data Epoch J2000 Equinox ICRS
- Constellation: Chamaeleon
- Right ascension: 08^{h} 41^{m} 19.51442^{s}
- Declination: −78° 57′ 48.1023″
- Apparent magnitude (V): 5.453

Characteristics
- Evolutionary stage: main sequence
- Spectral type: B8V
- U−B color index: −0.34
- B−V color index: −0.10

Astrometry
Radial velocity (R_{v})	14.00 km/s
Proper motion (μ)	RA: −29.430 mas/yr Dec.: +26.831 mas/yr
Parallax (π)	10.1679±0.0665 mas
Distance	321 ± 2 ly (98.3 ± 0.6 pc)
Absolute magnitude (M_{V})	+0.57

Details
Mass	3.20+0.06 −0.07 M_{☉}
Radius	3.3 R_{☉}
Luminosity	99.81±52.10 L_{☉}
Surface gravity (log g)	3.75 cgs
Temperature	12,487±98 K
Metallicity [Fe/H]	−0.88 dex
Rotational velocity (v sin i)	390 km/s
Age	8–14 Myr

Other designations
- η Cha, CPD−78°372, GC 12063, HD 75416, HIP 42637, HR 3502, SAO 256543

Database references
SIMBAD	data

Eta Chamaeleontis is a star in the constellation Chamaeleon. Its name is a Bayer designation that is Latinized from η Chamaeleontis, and abbreviated Eta Cha or η Cha. This star has an apparent magnitude of about 5.5, meaning that it is just barely visible to the naked eye. Based upon parallax measurements, it is located some 321 light-years (98 parsecs) away from the Sun. It is drifting further away with a line of sight velocity component of 14 km/s

Eta Chamaeleontis has a spectral type of B8V, meaning it is a B-type main sequence star. Stars of this type are typically a few times more massive than the Sun and have effective temperatures of about 10,000 to 30,000 K. Eta Chamaeleontis is just over 3 times more massive than the Sun and has a temperature of about 12,000 K.

== Cluster ==
Eta Chamaeleontis is the brightest and most massive member of the eponymous Eta Chamaeleontis cluster (also known as the Eta Chamaeleontis association or Mamajek 1, pronounced /ˈmæmədʒɛk/), a very nearby (316 light years), and young (8 million years old) stellar moving group discovered in 1999. The cluster contains nearly 20 stellar members spread out over a 40-arcminute diameter region of sky, including the neighboring A-type star HD 75505 and the eclipsing binary RS Cha. The eclipsing binary RS Cha is a well-constrained system which enables precise age-dating, which recent results yield an age of 9 million years. All of the low-mass members (including RS Cha) are pre-main sequence, and several of them appear to still be accreting from protoplanetary disks. Although containing only about 20 members, the cluster appears to be the densest stellar cluster within 100 pc (~30 solar masses per cubic parsec).

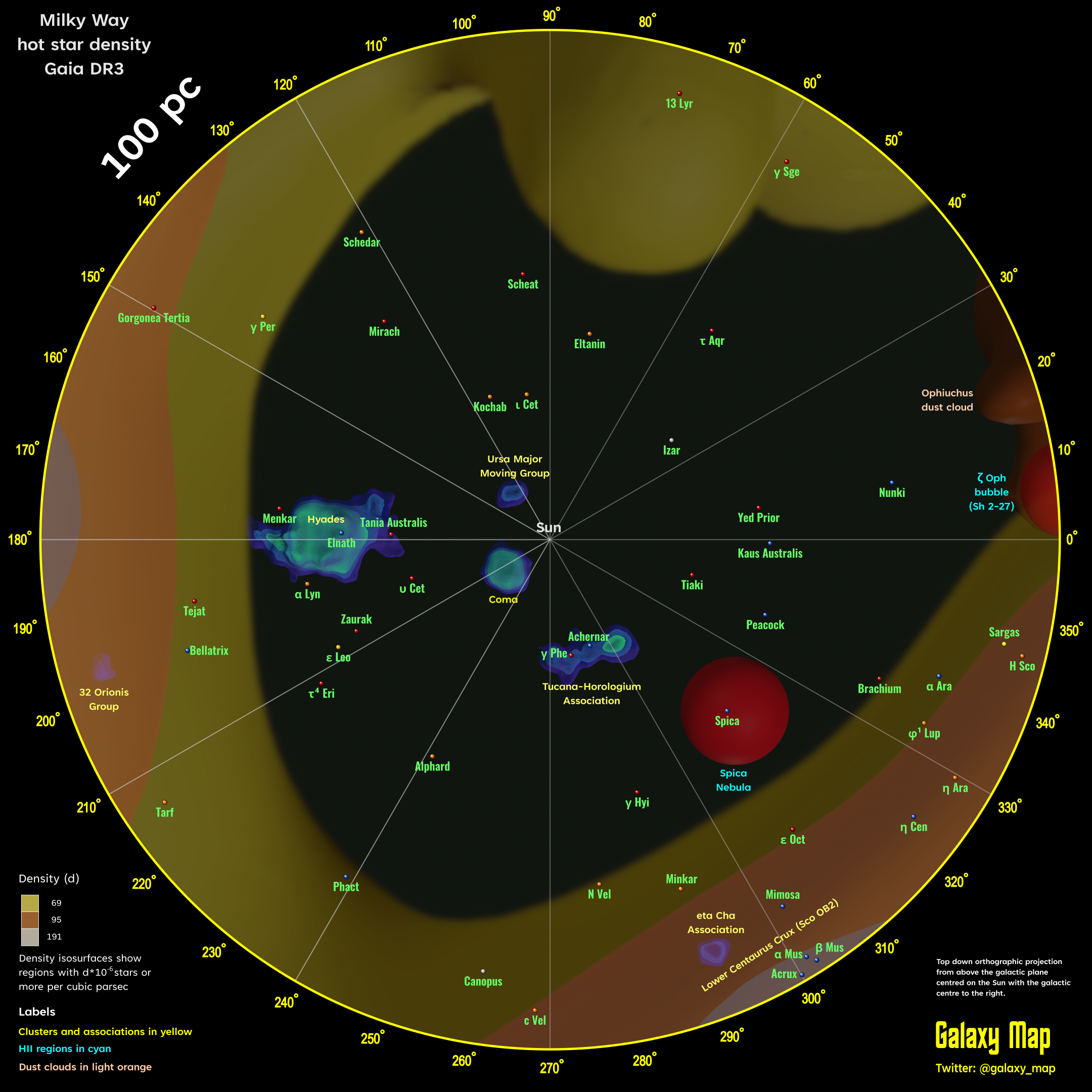
Map of stars and open clusters within 100 parsecs of the Sun. Eta Chamaeleontis is near the map edge at 290° galactic longitude.
