= IC 2944 =

H II region and open cluster in the constellation Centaurus

Emission nebula
- open cluster
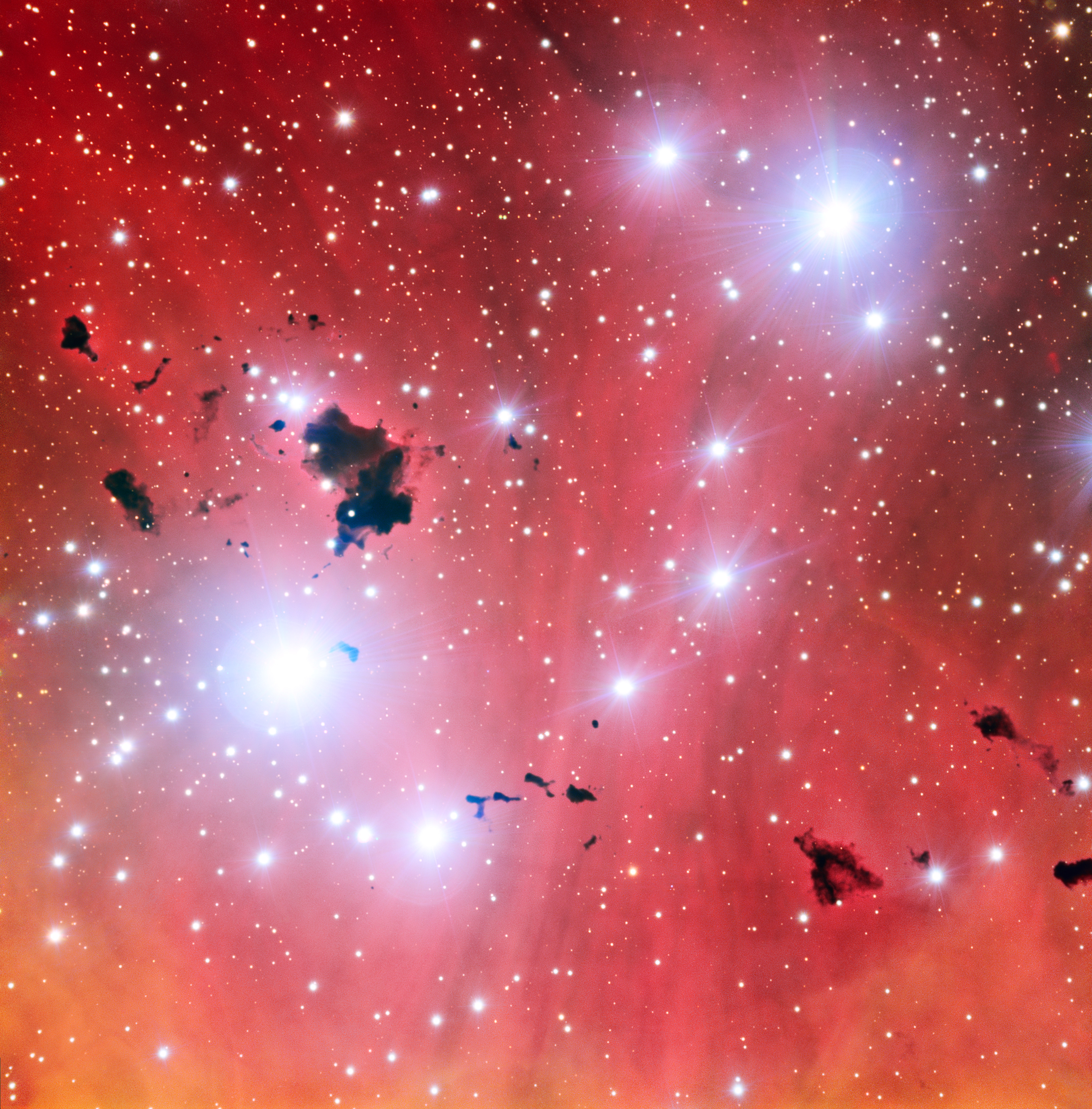

Observation data: J2000.0 epoch
- Right ascension: 11^{h} 36^{m} 36.0^{s}
- Declination: −63° 02′ 00″
- Distance: 6500 ly
- Apparent magnitude (V): 4.5
- Apparent dimensions (V): 75'
- Constellation: Centaurus

Physical characteristics
- Radius: 71 ly
- Notable features: open cluster with nebulosity, Bok globules
- Designations: IC 2944, RCW 62; Running Chicken Nebula, Lambda Cen Nebula, Caldwell 100.

IC 2944/8 image from the Wide Field Imager on the MPG/ESO 2.2-metre telescope

IC 2944, also known as the Running Chicken Nebula, the Lambda Centauri Nebula or the λ Centauri Nebula, is an open cluster with an associated emission nebula found in the constellation Centaurus, near the star λ Centauri. It features Bok globules, which are frequently a site of active star formation. However, no evidence for star formation has been found in any of the globules in IC 2944. Other designations for IC 2944 include RCW 62, G40 and G42.

The ESO Very Large Telescope image on the right is a close up of a set of Bok globules discovered in IC 2944 by astronomer A. David Thackeray in 1950. These globules are now known as Thackeray's Globules. In 2MASS images, 6 stars are visible within the largest globule.

The region of nebulosity visible in modern images includes both IC 2944 and IC 2948, as well as the fainter IC 2872 nearby. IC 2948 is the brightest emission and reflection nebulae towards the southeast, while IC 2944 is the cluster of stars and surrounding nebulosity stretching towards λ Centauri. IC 2944 gets the nickname "Running Chicken Nebula" from a group of stars that resemble a running chicken. The star Lambda Centauri lies just outside IC 2944. The nebulae is 6,500 light years from earth.
