= Psi1 Lupi =

Star in the constellation Lupus

ψ^{1} Lupi
- Location of ψ^{1} Lupi (circled in red)

Observation data Epoch J2000 Equinox ICRS
- Constellation: Lupus
- Right ascension: 15^{h} 39^{m} 45.97931^{s}
- Declination: −34° 24′ 42.9073″
- Apparent magnitude (V): +4.663

Characteristics
- Evolutionary stage: red clump
- Spectral type: G8/K0 III
- B−V color index: 0.964±0.047

Astrometry
Radial velocity (R_{v})	−23.1±0.8 km/s
Proper motion (μ)	RA: +6.123 mas/yr Dec.: −11.767 mas/yr
Parallax (π)	15.7610±0.2700 mas
Distance	207 ± 4 ly (63 ± 1 pc)
Absolute magnitude (M_{V})	+0.24

Details
Mass	2.42 M_{☉}
Radius	10.76+0.20 −0.08 R_{☉}
Luminosity	62.0±1.2 L_{☉}
Surface gravity (log g)	3.28 cgs
Temperature	4,939+17 −46 K
Metallicity [Fe/H]	−0.34 dex

Other designations
- ψ^{1} Lup, 3 Lup, CD−33°10631, FK5 3237, HD 139521, HIP 76705, HR 5820, SAO 206843

Database references
SIMBAD	data

Psi^{1} Lupi, which is Latinized from ψ^{1} Lupi, is a single star in the southern constellation of Lupus. It has a yellow-white hue and is faintly visible to the naked eye with an apparent visual magnitude of +4.66. The star is located at a distance of approximately 207 light years from the Sun based on parallax. It is drifting closer with a radial velocity of −23 km/s, and is predicted to come to within 36 light-years in 2.8 million years.

This is an evolved giant star with a stellar classification of G8/K0 III. With the hydrogen exhausted at its core, the star has cooled and expanded to 11 times the radius of the Sun. It is a red clump giant, which indicates it is on the horizontal branch and is generating energy through core helium fusion. The star has an estimated 2.4 times the Sun's mass and is radiating 62 times the luminosity of the Sun from its photosphere at an effective temperature of 4,939 K.

The star is surrounded by a cold circumstellar envelope, hinted at by the anomaly of the small observed power of the doublet Mg II emission at 2800 angstrom. The absorption cores on the peaks of the emission profiles Mg II k and h are mainly of interstellar origin and only partly due to self-absorption in the star's chromosphere.

== See also ==
- ψ^{2} Lupi
