= Phi Centauri =

Star in the constellation Centaurus

φ Centauri
- Location of φ Centauri (circled)

Observation data Epoch J2000.0 Equinox ICRS
- Constellation: Centaurus
- Right ascension: 13^{h} 58^{m} 16.27^{s}
- Declination: −42° 06′ 02.7″
- Apparent magnitude (V): +3.745

Characteristics
- Spectral type: B2 IV
- U−B color index: −0.851
- B−V color index: −0.222

Astrometry
Radial velocity (R_{v})	+5.3±1.5 km/s
Proper motion (μ)	RA: −22.77±0.15 mas/yr Dec.: −20.13±0.12 mas/yr
Parallax (π)	6.21±0.17 mas
Distance	530 ± 10 ly (161 ± 4 pc)
Absolute magnitude (M_{V})	−2.20

Details
Mass	8.5±0.3 M_{☉}
Radius	4.19±0.35 R_{☉}
Luminosity	4,000 L_{☉}
Surface gravity (log g)	4.08±0.07 cgs
Temperature	21,638±388 K
Rotational velocity (v sin i)	79 km/s
Age	18.0±3.2 Myr

Other designations
- φ Cen, CD−41°8329, GC 18874, HD 121743, HIP 68245, HR 5248, SAO 224577

Database references
SIMBAD	data

Phi Centauri is a blue-white hued star in the southern constellation Centaurus. Its name is a Bayer designation that is Latinized from φ Centauri, and abbreviated Phi Cen or φ Cen. This star is visible to the naked eye with an apparent visual magnitude of +3.7. The annual parallax shift is 6.21 mas as measured from Earth, which yields a distance estimate of around 530 light years. It is moving further from the Sun with a radial velocity of +5 km/s.

This is a B-type subgiant star with a stellar classification of B2 IV. It has no known companions, but does show radial velocity variations and higher order pulsations in the spectrum. The star is just 18 million years old with 8.5 times the mass of the Sun and has 4.2 times the Sun's radius. It is radiating around 4,000 times the Sun's luminosity from its photosphere at an effective temperature of about 21,638 K.

This star is a proper motion member of the Upper Centaurus–Lupus sub-group in the Scorpius–Centaurus OB association, the nearest such co-moving association of massive stars to the Sun.
