= Centaurus in Chinese astronomy =

A star constellation in traditional Chinese astronomy

The modern constellation Centaurus lies across two of the quadrants symbolized by the Azure Dragon of the East (東方青龍, Dōng Fāng Qīng Lóng), the Vermillion Bird of the South (南方朱雀, Nán Fāng Zhū Què), and the Southern Asterisms (近南極星區, Jìnnánjíxīngōu).

According to the quadrant, Centaurus is possibly not fully visible in the Chinese sky. Hadar (Beta Centauri) is a bright star in this constellation that is possibly never seen in Chinese sky.

The name of the western constellation in modern Chinese is 半人馬座 (bàn rén mǎ zuò), meaning "the centaur constellation".

== Stars ==
The map of Chinese constellation in constellation Centaurus area consists of:

Four Symbols	Mansion (Chinese name)	Romanization	Translation	Asterisms (Chinese name)	Romanization	Translation	Western star name	Proper Name	Chinese star name	Romanization	Translation
Azure Dragon of the East (東方青龍)	角	Jiǎo	Horn	庫樓	Kùlóu	Arsenal					
Azure Dragon of the East (東方青龍)	角	Jiǎo	Horn	庫樓	Kùlóu	Arsenal	ζ Cen	Leepwal	庫樓一	Kùlóuyī	1st star
Azure Dragon of the East (東方青龍)	角	Jiǎo	Horn	庫樓	Kùlóu	Arsenal	η Cen		庫樓二	Kùlóuèr	2nd star
Azure Dragon of the East (東方青龍)	角	Jiǎo	Horn	庫樓	Kùlóu	Arsenal	θ Cen	Menkent	庫樓三	Kùlóusān	3rd star
Azure Dragon of the East (東方青龍)	角	Jiǎo	Horn	庫樓	Kùlóu	Arsenal	2 Cen		庫樓四	Kùlóusì	4th star
Azure Dragon of the East (東方青龍)	角	Jiǎo	Horn	庫樓	Kùlóu	Arsenal	d Cen		庫樓五	Kùlóuwǔ	5th star
Azure Dragon of the East (東方青龍)	角	Jiǎo	Horn	庫樓	Kùlóu	Arsenal	ξ^{1} Cen		庫樓六	Kùlóuliù	6th star
Azure Dragon of the East (東方青龍)	角	Jiǎo	Horn	庫樓	Kùlóu	Arsenal	γ Cen		庫樓七	Kùlóuqī	7th star
Azure Dragon of the East (東方青龍)	角	Jiǎo	Horn	庫樓	Kùlóu	Arsenal	τ Cen		庫樓五	Kùlóubā	8th star
Azure Dragon of the East (東方青龍)	角	Jiǎo	Horn	庫樓	Kùlóu	Arsenal	D Cen		庫樓九	Kùlóujiǔ	9th star
Azure Dragon of the East (東方青龍)	角	Jiǎo	Horn	庫樓	Kùlóu	Arsenal	σ Cen		庫樓十	Kùlóushí	10th star
Azure Dragon of the East (東方青龍)	角	Jiǎo	Horn	庫樓	Kùlóu	Arsenal	ω Cen		庫樓增一	Kùlóuzēngyī	1st additional star
Azure Dragon of the East (東方青龍)	角	Jiǎo	Horn	柱	Zhǔ	Pillars					
Azure Dragon of the East (東方青龍)	角	Jiǎo	Horn	柱	Zhǔ	Pillars	υ^{2} Cen		柱一	Zhǔyī	1st star
Azure Dragon of the East (東方青龍)	角	Jiǎo	Horn	柱	Zhǔ	Pillars	υ^{1} Cen		柱二	Zhǔèr	2nd star
Azure Dragon of the East (東方青龍)	角	Jiǎo	Horn	柱	Zhǔ	Pillars	a Cen		柱五	Zhǔwǔ	5th star
Azure Dragon of the East (東方青龍)	角	Jiǎo	Horn	柱	Zhǔ	Pillars	ψ Cen		柱六	Zhǔliù	6th star
Azure Dragon of the East (東方青龍)	角	Jiǎo	Horn	柱	Zhǔ	Pillars	4 Cen		柱七	Zhǔqī	7th star
Azure Dragon of the East (東方青龍)	角	Jiǎo	Horn	柱	Zhǔ	Pillars	3 Cen		柱八	Zhǔbā	8th star
Azure Dragon of the East (東方青龍)	角	Jiǎo	Horn	柱	Zhǔ	Pillars	1 Cen		柱九	Zhǔjiǔ	9th star
Azure Dragon of the East (東方青龍)	角	Jiǎo	Horn	柱	Zhǔ	Pillars	ι Cen	Kulou			
Azure Dragon of the East (東方青龍)	角	Jiǎo	Horn	柱	Zhǔ	Pillars	ι Cen	Kulou	柱十一	Zhǔshíyī	11th star
Azure Dragon of the East (東方青龍)	角	Jiǎo	Horn	柱	Zhǔ	Pillars	ι Cen	Kulou	库楼西北星	Kùlóuxīběixīng	Star in the northwest of Arsenal constellation
Azure Dragon of the East (東方青龍)	角	Jiǎo	Horn	柱	Zhǔ	Pillars	ι Cen	Kulou	库楼距星	Kùlóujùxīng	Separated star of Arsenal constellation
Azure Dragon of the East (東方青龍)	角	Jiǎo	Horn	衡	Héng	Railing	ι Cen	Kulou			
Azure Dragon of the East (東方青龍)	角	Jiǎo	Horn	衡	Héng	Railing	ν Cen	Heng	衡一	Héngyī	1st star
Azure Dragon of the East (東方青龍)	角	Jiǎo	Horn	衡	Héng	Railing	μ Cen		衡二	Héngèr	2nd star
Azure Dragon of the East (東方青龍)	角	Jiǎo	Horn	衡	Héng	Railing	φ Cen		衡三	Héngsān	3rd star
Azure Dragon of the East (東方青龍)	角	Jiǎo	Horn	衡	Héng	Railing	χ Cen		衡四	Héngsì	4th star
Azure Dragon of the East (東方青龍)	角	Jiǎo	Horn	南門	Nánmén	Southern Gate					
Azure Dragon of the East (東方青龍)	角	Jiǎo	Horn	南門	Nánmén	Southern Gate	ε Cen		南門一	Nánményī	1st star
Azure Dragon of the East (東方青龍)	角	Jiǎo	Horn	南門	Nánmén	Southern Gate	α Cen	Rigil Kentaurus (for component A), Toliman (for component B)	南門二	Nánménèr	2nd star
Azure Dragon of the East (東方青龍)	角	Jiǎo	Horn	南門	Nánmén	Southern Gate	R Cen		南門增一	Nánménzēngyī	1st additional star
Azure Dragon of the East (東方青龍)	亢	Kàng	Neck	陽門	Yángmén	Gate of Yang					
Azure Dragon of the East (東方青龍)	亢	Kàng	Neck	陽門	Yángmén	Gate of Yang	b Cen		陽門一	Yángményī	1st star
Azure Dragon of the East (東方青龍)	亢	Kàng	Neck	陽門	Yángmén	Gate of Yang	c^{1} Cen		陽門二	Yángménèr	2nd star
Azure Dragon of the East (東方青龍)	氐	Dī	Root	騎官	Qíguān	Imperial Guards	κ Cen		騎官三	Qíguānsān	3rd star
-	近南極星區 (non-mansions)	Jìnnánjíxīngōu (non-mansions)	The Southern Asterisms (non-mansions)								
-	近南極星區 (non-mansions)	Jìnnánjíxīngōu (non-mansions)	The Southern Asterisms (non-mansions)	海山	Hǎishān	Sea and Mountain	λ Cen		海山五	Hǎishānwu	5th star
-	近南極星區 (non-mansions)	Jìnnánjíxīngōu (non-mansions)	The Southern Asterisms (non-mansions)	馬尾	Mǎwěi	Horse's Tail					
-	近南極星區 (non-mansions)	Jìnnánjíxīngōu (non-mansions)	The Southern Asterisms (non-mansions)	馬尾	Mǎwěi	Horse's Tail	G Cen		馬尾一	Mǎwěiyī	1st star
-	近南極星區 (non-mansions)	Jìnnánjíxīngōu (non-mansions)	The Southern Asterisms (non-mansions)	馬尾	Mǎwěi	Horse's Tail	ρ Cen		馬尾二	Mǎwěièr	2nd star
-	近南極星區 (non-mansions)	Jìnnánjíxīngōu (non-mansions)	The Southern Asterisms (non-mansions)	馬尾	Mǎwěi	Horse's Tail	δ Cen				
-	近南極星區 (non-mansions)	Jìnnánjíxīngōu (non-mansions)	The Southern Asterisms (non-mansions)	馬尾	Mǎwěi	Horse's Tail	δ Cen		馬尾三	Mǎwěisān	3rd star
-	近南極星區 (non-mansions)	Jìnnánjíxīngōu (non-mansions)	The Southern Asterisms (non-mansions)	馬尾	Mǎwěi	Horse's Tail	δ Cen		水府西星	Shuǐfǔxīxīng	Star in the west of Irrigation Official constellation
-	近南極星區 (non-mansions)	Jìnnánjíxīngōu (non-mansions)	The Southern Asterisms (non-mansions)	馬腹	Mǎfù	Horse's Abdomen					
-	近南極星區 (non-mansions)	Jìnnánjíxīngōu (non-mansions)	The Southern Asterisms (non-mansions)	馬腹	Mǎfù	Horse's Abdomen	β Cen	Hadar	馬腹一	Mǎfùyī	1st star
-	近南極星區 (non-mansions)	Jìnnánjíxīngōu (non-mansions)	The Southern Asterisms (non-mansions)	馬腹	Mǎfù	Horse's Abdomen	HD 116243		馬腹二	Mǎfùèr	2nd star

== See also ==
- Traditional Chinese star names
- Chinese constellations
- List of brightest stars
