= C Centauri =

The Bayer designations c Centauri and C Centauri are distinct.

The designation c Centauri is shared by two star systems in the constellation Centaurus:

- c^{1} Centauri (HD 129456)
- c^{2} Centauri (HD 129685)

The designation C Centauri is shared by three star systems:

- C^{1} Centauri (V763 Centauri)
- C^{2} Centauri (HD 100825)
- C^{3} Centauri (HD 101067)

== See also ==
- γ Centauri
- Alpha Centauri C (Proxima Centauri)
- σ Centauri
- 3 Centauri
