= Zeta Centauri =

Star in the constellation Centaurus

- Location of ζ Centauri (circled)

Observation data Epoch J2000.0 Equinox ICRS
- Constellation: Centaurus
- Right ascension: 13^{h} 55^{m} 32.38565^{s}
- Declination: −47° 17′ 18.1482″
- Apparent magnitude (V): +2.55

Characteristics
- Spectral type: B2.5 IV
- U−B color index: −0.91
- B−V color index: −0.22

Astrometry
Radial velocity (R_{v})	+6.5±1.2 km/s
Proper motion (μ)	RA: −57.37 mas/yr Dec.: −44.55 mas/yr
Parallax (π)	8.54±0.13 mas
Distance	382 ± 6 ly (117 ± 2 pc)
Absolute magnitude (M_{V})	−2.79

Orbit
Period (P)	8.02352 days
Semi-major axis (a)	0.20 au (43 R_{☉})
Eccentricity (e)	0.5
Inclination (i)	~60°
Periastron epoch (T)	2429798.46 JD
Argument of periastron (ω) (secondary)	290°
Semi-amplitude (K_{1}) (primary)	110.7±1.9 km/s
Semi-amplitude (K_{2}) (secondary)	159.4±2.0 km/s

Details

A
Mass	8.9±0.2 M_{☉}
Radius	4.8 R_{☉}
Temperature	22,100 K
Age	16±2 Myr

B
Mass	7.0±0.1 M_{☉}
Radius	3.7 R_{☉}
Temperature	20,000 K
Age	16±2 Myr

Other designations
- Leepwal, ζ Cen, CD−46 8949, CPD−46 6560, HD 121263, HIP 68002, HR 5231, SAO 224538

Database references
SIMBAD	data

Zeta Centauri is a binary star system in the southern constellation of Centaurus. It has the proper name Leepwal; Zeta Centauri is its Bayer designation. With a combined apparent visual magnitude of +2.55, it is one of the brighter members of the constellation. This system is close enough to the Earth that its distance can be measured directly using the parallax technique. This yields a value of roughly 382 light-years (117 parsecs), with a 1.6% margin of error. It is drifting further away with a radial velocity of +6.5 km/s.

== Characteristics ==
ζ Cen is a double-lined spectroscopic binary system, which indicates that the orbital motion was detected by shifts in the absorption lines of their combined spectra caused by the Doppler effect. The two stars orbit each other over a period of 8.02352 days with an orbital eccentricity of about 0.5, a semi-major axis of 0.20 au and an inclination relative to the line of sight of roughly 60°. The system has been resolved in 2026 using interferometry of the GRAVITY instrument aboard the Very Large Telescope, enabling a determination of the stellar masses using stellar evolution models.

The combined spectral class of the system is B2.5 IV. The primary component of this system, ζ Cen A, has 8.9 times the mass of the Sun, 4.8 times the Sun's radius, and an effective temperature of 22,100 K. The secondary component, ζ Cen B, has 7.0 times the mass of the Sun and 3.7 times its radius, with a temperature of 20,000 K. The system is young, only 16 million years old, and is expected to merge into a single star as the primary evolves into a subgiant and fills its Roche lobe, engulfing the secondary.

== Nomenclature ==
Zeta Centauri, Latinized from ζ Centauri, is the star's Bayer designation. Along with other modern Bayer designations in Centaurus, it was assigned by Nicolas Louis de Lacaille in his 1756 star catalog; the star referred to as ζ Centauri in Bayer's Uranometria of 1603 is Acrux in the Southern Cross, then considered part of Centaurus.

This star has been referred to by the proper name Alnair /æˈnɛər/, from Arabic: نير بطن قنطورس, romanized: nayyir baṭan qanṭūris, lit. 'the bright (star) of the body of the centaur', though this was originally a name for Acrux (see above). Alnair is also the proper name of α Gruis and was officially approved by the IAU as the name of that star. This star has also been referred to as Baten Kentaurus, from the same Arabic source.

In Chinese, 庫樓 (Kù Lóu), meaning Arsenal, refers to an asterism consisting of ζ Centauri, η Centauri, θ Centauri, 2 Centauri, HD 117440, ξ^{1} Centauri, γ Centauri, τ Centauri, D Centauri and σ Centauri. Consequently, the Chinese name for ζ Centauri itself is 庫樓一 (Kù Lóu yī, English: the First Star of Arsenal.) (See also ι Centauri.)

In Marshallese, this star is named Ļeepwal (pronounced leyepwal), the third of the ten sons of Lōktañūr (Capella). The IAU Working Group on Star Names approved the name Leepwal for Zeta Centauri A on 18 July 2024 and it is now so entered in the IAU Catalog of Star Names.
