= Iota Centauri =

Star in the constellation Centaurus

ι Centauri
- Location of ι Centauri (circled)

Observation data Epoch J2000.0 Equinox ICRS
- Constellation: Centaurus
- Right ascension: 13^{h} 20^{m} 35.81737^{s}
- Declination: −36° 42′ 44.2447″
- Apparent magnitude (V): +2.73

Characteristics
- Evolutionary stage: main sequence
- Spectral type: A2 V (kA1.5hA3mA3va)
- U−B color index: +0.01
- B−V color index: +0.03

Astrometry
Radial velocity (R_{v})	+0.1 km/s
Proper motion (μ)	RA: −341.11 mas/yr Dec.: −86.14 mas/yr
Parallax (π)	55.49±0.17 mas
Distance	58.8 ± 0.2 ly (18.02 ± 0.06 pc)
Absolute magnitude (M_{V})	+1.47

Details
Mass	2.03±0.03 M_{☉}
Radius	1.9 ± 0.05 (Note: Calculated, using the Stefan-Boltzmann law and the star's effective temperature and luminosity, with respect to the solar nominal effective temperature of 5,772 K: $$\sqrt{\biggl(\frac{5,772}{9,160}\biggr)^4 \cdot 10^{1.36}} = 1.9\ R_\odot.$$) R_{☉}
Luminosity	22.91+1.08 −1.03 L_{☉}
Surface gravity (log g)	4.11 cgs
Temperature	9,160±70 K
Metallicity [Fe/H]	–0.46 dex
Rotational velocity (v sin i)	90.3 km/s
Age	0.35 Gyr

Other designations
- Kulou, ι Cen, CD−36°8497, FK5 496, GJ 508.1, GJ 9441, HD 115892, HIP 65109, HR 5028, SAO 204371

Database references
SIMBAD	data

Iota Centauri is a star in the southern constellation of Centaurus. It has the proper name Kulou; Iota Centauri is its Bayer designation, which is Latinized from ι Centauri and is abbreviated Iota Cen or ι Cen. Based upon parallax measurements, it lies at a distance of approximately 58.6 light-years (18.0 parsecs) from Earth. Iota Centauri has an apparent visual magnitude of +2.73, making it easily visible to the naked eye.

The spectrum of ι Centauri matches a stellar classification of A2 V. It is an A-type main sequence star that is generating energy by the nuclear fusion of hydrogen in its core region. This energy is being radiated from the outer envelope of the star at an effective temperature of 9,160 K, giving the star a white hue. It has about 2 times the Sun's mass, 1.9 times the Sun's radius, and is roughly 350 million years old. The abundance of elements other than hydrogen and helium, what astronomers term the metallicity, is only 35% of the abundance in the Sun. A weak magnetic field has been tentatively identified with a strength of −77 ± 30 G.

This star has an excess emission of infrared indicating it is surrounded by a circumstellar disk of dust, known as a debris disk. The disk is located within an orbital radius of six Astronomical Units from the star. The dust is unusually luminous for a star this age, suggesting that some process may have recently increased the amount of debris, such as collisions between planetesimals. Alternatively, the planetesimals in this system may have unusual physical properties. As of 2011, a search for planets in this system has thus far been unsuccessful.

Iota Centauri appears to belong to the stellar kinematic group known as IC 2391. This is a group of around 16 co-moving stars that most likely originated in the same molecular cloud at least 45 million years ago.

== Nomenclature ==
In Chinese, 柱 (Zhǔ), meaning Pillars, refers to an asterism consisting of ι Centauri, υ^{2} Centauri, υ^{1} Centauri, a Centauri, ψ Centauri, 4 Centauri, 3 Centauri and 1 Centauri. Consequently, the Chinese name for ι Centauri itself is 柱十一 (Zhǔ shíyī, English: the Eleventh Star of Pillars.)

In older Chinese sources, this star was a member of the ancient super-constellation Kulou (库楼, The Arsenal), in the area of modern Centaurus and Lupus, dating back to the 2nd century BCE. Later, ζ Centauri was identified as the main star of Kulou. The IAU Working Group on Star Names approved the name Kulou for this star on 17 February 2025 and it is now so entered in the IAU Catalog of Star Names.
