= Theta Centauri =

Star in the constellation Centaurus

- Location of θ Centauri (circled)

Observation data Epoch J2000.0 Equinox ICRS
- Constellation: Centaurus
- Right ascension: 14^{h} 06^{m} 40.94752^{s}
- Declination: −36° 22′ 11.8371″
- Apparent magnitude (V): +2.06

Characteristics
- Evolutionary stage: Red clump
- Spectral type: K0 III
- U−B color index: +0.90
- B−V color index: +0.99

Astrometry
Radial velocity (R_{v})	+1.3 km/s
Proper motion (μ)	RA: −520.53 mas/yr Dec.: −518.06 mas/yr
Parallax (π)	55.45±0.20 mas
Distance	58.8 ± 0.2 ly (18.03 ± 0.07 pc)
Absolute magnitude (M_{V})	0.87

Details
Mass	1.32±0.08 M_{☉}
Radius	10.96±0.20 R_{☉}
Luminosity	56.0+2.6 −2.5 (Note: Calculated using absolute bolometric magnitude of +0.37±0.05 via the equation 10^{0.4(4.74−M_{bol})}.) L_{☉}
Surface gravity (log g)	2.61±0.09 cgs
Temperature	4,853±41 K
Metallicity [Fe/H]	−0.047±0.032 dex

Other designations
- Menkent, θ Cen, Theta Cen, 5 Centauri, CD−35° 9260, FK5 520, GJ 539, HD 123139, HIP 68933, HR 5288, SAO 205188, LHS 2858

Database references
SIMBAD	data

Theta Centauri is a single star in the southern constellation of Centaurus, the centaur. It has the official name Menkent, pronounced /ˈmɛŋkɛnt/; Theta Centauri is its Bayer designation, which is Latinized from θ Centauri and abbreviated Theta Cen or θ Cen. With an apparent visual magnitude of +2.06, it is the fourth-brightest member of the constellation. Based on parallax measurements obtained during the Hipparcos mission, it is about 58.8 light-years (18.0 parsecs) distant. It has a relatively high proper motion, traversing the celestial sphere at the rate of 0.73 arcsecond/yr. This suggests that Menkent may have originated in the outer disk of the Milky Way and is merely passing through the solar neighborhood.

== Nomenclature ==
θ Centauri, Latinised to Theta Centauri, is the star's Bayer designation.

It bore the traditional name of Menkent derived from the Arabic word مَنْكِب (mankib) for "shoulder" (of the Centaur), apparently blended with a shortened form of "kentaurus" (centaur). In 2016, the International Astronomical Union organized a Working Group on Star Names (WGSN) to catalog and standardize proper names for stars. The WGSN approved the name Menkent for this star on 21 August 2016 and it is now so included in the List of IAU-approved Star Names.

In Chinese, 庫樓 (Kù Lóu), meaning arsenal, refers to an asterism consisting of Theta Centauri, Zeta Centauri, Eta Centauri, 2 Centauri, HD 117440, Xi¹ Centauri, Gamma Centauri, Tau Centauri, D Centauri and Sigma Centauri. Consequently, the Chinese name for Theta Centauri itself is 庫樓三 (Kù Lóu sān, English: the Third Star of Arsenal).

== Properties ==
This is an evolved giant star with a stellar classification of K0 III and 1.27 times the mass of the Sun. It is believed to be fusing helium into carbon and heavier elements within its core, qualifying it as a red clump star. It is a southern analog to Pollux, the brightest star in Gemini and the closest giant to the Sun. Menkent is 11 times larger than the Sun and 56 times more luminous. The outer envelope has an effective temperature of 4,853 K, giving it the orange-hued glow of a cool, K-type star. Soft X-ray emission has been detected from this star, which has an estimated X-ray luminosity of 1.4 × 10^{27} erg s^{−1}.

== See also ==
- List of nearest giant stars
