= Gamma Centauri =

Star in the constellation Centaurus

- Location of γ Centauri (circled)

Observation data Epoch J2000 Equinox ICRS
- Constellation: Centaurus
- Right ascension: 12^{h} 41^{m} 31.04008^{s}
- Declination: −48° 57′ 35.5375″
- Apparent magnitude (V): +2.17 (+2.84/+2.94)

Characteristics

A
- Evolutionary stage: subgiant
- Spectral type: A1IV
- U−B color index: 0.00
- B−V color index: −0.03

B
- Evolutionary stage: subgiant
- Spectral type: A0IV
- U−B color index: −0.02
- B−V color index: +0.01

Astrometry
Radial velocity (R_{v})	−5.5 km/s
Proper motion (μ)	RA: −185.72 mas/yr Dec.: +5.79 mas/yr
Parallax (π)	25.06±0.28 mas
Distance	130 ± 1 ly (39.9 ± 0.4 pc)
Absolute magnitude (M_{V})	−0.81

Orbit
Period (P)	83.57±0.21 yr
Semi-major axis (a)	0.869±0.011″
Eccentricity (e)	0.793±0.003
Inclination (i)	113.7±0.7°
Longitude of the node (Ω)	2.6±0.7°
Periastron epoch (T)	1931.25 ± 0.07
Argument of periastron (ω) (secondary)	187.9±1.5°

Details

A
Mass	2.8 M_{☉}
Radius	3.8 (Note: Calculated, using the Stefan-Boltzmann law and the star's effective temperature and luminosity, with respect to the solar nominal effective temperature of 5,772 K: $$\sqrt{\biggl(\frac{5,772}{9,300}\biggr)^4 \cdot 95} = 3.8\ R_\odot.$$) R_{☉}
Luminosity	95 L_{☉}
Temperature	9,300 K

B
Mass	2.8 M_{☉}
Radius	3.8 R_{☉}
Luminosity	95 L_{☉}
Temperature	9,300 K

Other designations
- Muhlifain, γ Cen, CD−48°7597, GC 17262, HD 110304, HIP 61932, HR 4819, SAO 223603, CCDM J12415-4858, WDS 12415-4858

Database references
SIMBAD	data
- A
- B

Gamma Centauri is a binary star system in the southern constellation of Centaurus, which is probably part of a wider system together with Tau Centauri. The system is visible to the naked eye as a single point of light with a combined apparent visual magnitude of +2.17; individually they are third-magnitude stars.

== Nomenclature ==
Its main name is a Bayer designation that is Latinized from γ Centauri, and abbreviated Gamma Cen or γ Cen.

It has the proper name Muhlifain, not to be confused with Muliphein, which is γ Canis Majoris; both names derive from the same Arabic root.

== Characteristics ==
This system is located at a distance of about 130 light-years (40 parsecs) from the Sun based on parallax. In 2000, the pair had an angular separation of 1.217 arcseconds with a position angle of 351.9°. Their positions have been observed since 1897, which is long enough to estimate an orbital period of 84.5 years and a semimajor axis of 0.93 arcsecond. At the distance of this system, this is equivalent to a physical separation of about 93 AU.

The stars have spectral types of A1IV and A0IV, suggesting they are A-type subgiant stars in the process of becoming giants. The stars have similar characteristics, with an estimated 2.8 times the Sun's mass, 3.8 times the Sun's radius, around 100 times the Sun's luminosity, and an estimated effective temperature of 9,300 K.

The star Tau Centauri very likely makes a widely-separated binary system with Gamma Centauri, it is a co-moving star with an estimated separation of 1.72 light-years (0.53 parsecs). There is a 98% chance that they are gravitationally bound.

== Etymology ==
In Chinese astronomy, 庫樓 (Kù Lóu), meaning Arsenal, refers to an asterism consisting of γ Centauri, ζ Centauri, η Centauri, θ Centauri, 2 Centauri, HD 117440, ξ^{1} Centauri, τ Centauri, D Centauri and σ Centauri. Consequently, the Chinese name for γ Centauri itself is 庫樓七 (Kù Lóu qī, English: the Seventh Star of Arsenal).

The people of Aranda and Luritja tribe around Hermannsburg, Central Australia named a quadrangular arrangement comprising this star, δ Cen (Ma Wei), δ Cru (Imai) and γ Cru (Gacrux) as Iritjinga ("The Eagle-hawk").
