= Upsilon Centauri =

The Bayer designation Upsilon Centauri (υ Cen / υ Centauri) is shared by two star systems, in the constellation Centaurus:

- Upsilon^{1} Centauri
- Upsilon^{2} Centauri

They are separated by 0.96° on the sky.

All of them were member of asterism 柱 (Zhǔ), Pillars, Horn mansion.

== See also ==
- Y Centauri, a variable star called by the Latin letter Y
