= U Centauri =

The designations U Centauri and u Centauri refer to two different stars in the constellation Centaurus.

- U Centauri, the variable star designation for a faint Mira variable
- HD 108541, a B-type main-sequence star also known by its Latin-letter Bayer designation u Centauri

== See also ==
- υ Centauri
