= HD 105382 =

Star in the constellation Centaurus

- Location of HD 105382 (invisible beside δ Centauri at this scale)

Observation data Epoch J2000 Equinox ICRS
- Constellation: Centaurus
- Right ascension: 12^{h} 08^{m} 05.22401^{s}
- Declination: −50° 39′ 40.5728″
- Apparent magnitude (V): 4.47

Characteristics
- Spectral type: B6III
- U−B color index: −0.67
- B−V color index: −0.15
- Variable type: rotating variable

Astrometry
Radial velocity (R_{v})	16.5 km/s
Proper motion (μ)	RA: −35.16 mas/yr Dec.: −6.47 mas/yr
Parallax (π)	7.44±0.61 mas
Distance	440 ± 40 ly (130 ± 10 pc)
Absolute magnitude (M_{V})	−1.2±0.3
Absolute bolometric magnitude (M_{bol})	−2.9 ± 0.4

Details
Mass	5.7 ± 0.4 M_{☉}
Radius	3.0 ± 0.6 R_{☉}
Luminosity	1000^{+590}_{−370} L_{☉}
Surface gravity (log g)	4.18 ± 0.15 cgs
Temperature	17400 ± 400 K
Rotation	1.295 ± 0.001 days
Rotational velocity (v sin i)	90 km/s

Other designations
- CD−49°6813, HD 105382, HIP 59173, HR 4618, SAO 239687

Database references
SIMBAD	data

HD 105382 (also known as V863 Centauri) is a star in the constellation Centaurus. Its apparent magnitude is 4.47, making it visible to the naked eye under good observing conditions. From parallax measurements, it is located 130 parsecs (440 light years) from the Sun.

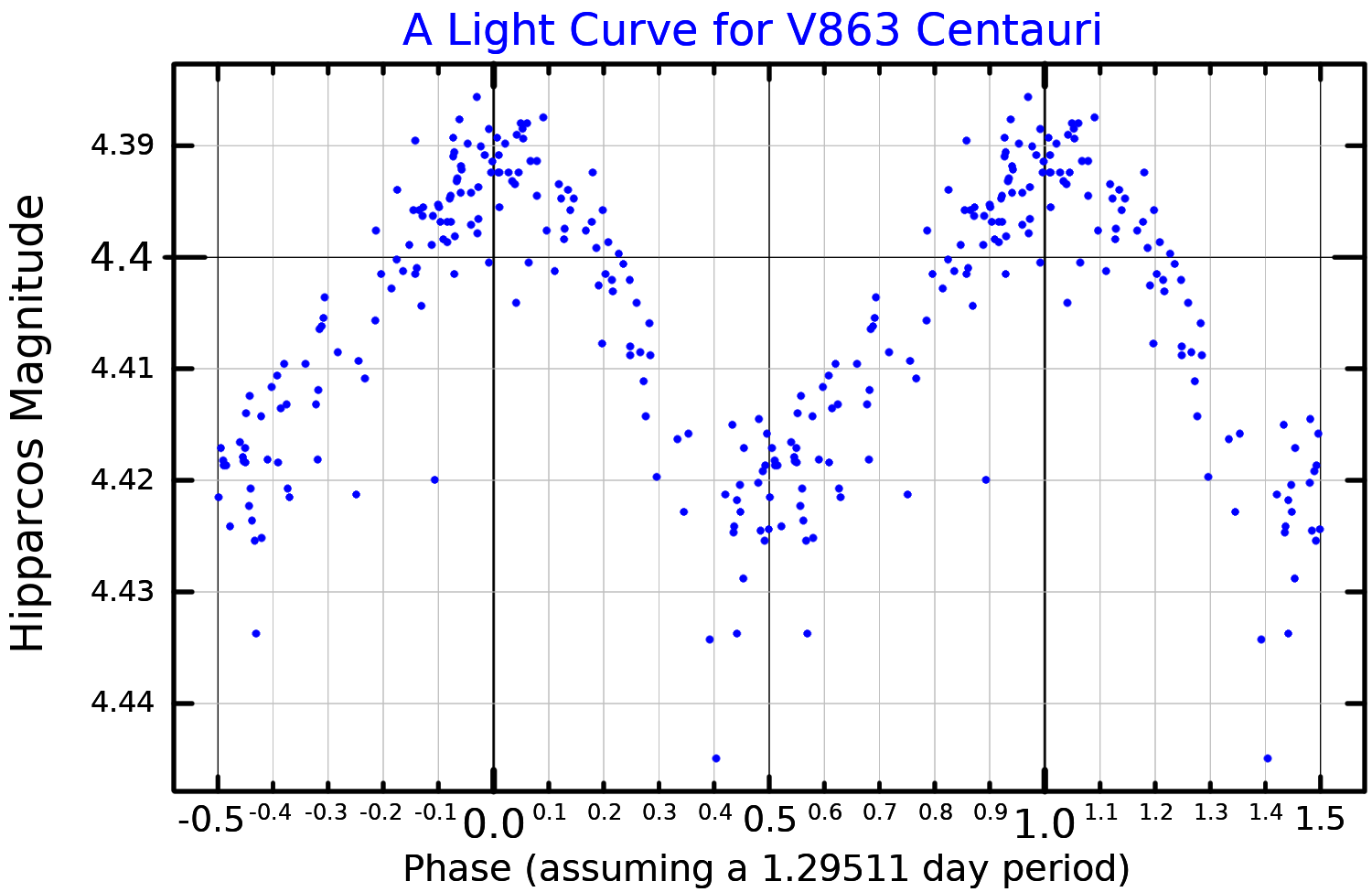
A light curve for V863 Centauri, plotted from Hipparcos data

In 1992, Luis A. Balona et al. announced their discovery that HD 105382 is a variable star. It was given its variable star designation, V863 Centauri, in 1993. HD 105382's apparent magnitude varies with an amplitude of 0.012 over a period of 1.295 days. It has been previously classified as a Be star, which would explain the variability as stellar pulsations, but this classification was probably due to accidental observation of the nearby Be star δ Centauri. A 2004 study showed that the 1.295 day period is actually the rotation period of the star, and that the variability is caused by non-homogeneous distribution of elements in the stellar surface. In particular, HD 105382 is a helium-weak chemically peculiar star with a helium abundance varying between 0.5% and 15% of the solar abundance, and a silicon abundance varying between 0.00044% and 0.0069% the solar value. Regions with more helium appear to coincide with the regions with less silicon, and vice versa. This peculiar abundance pattern is probably related to HD 105382's magnetic field, which has a polar strength of 2.3 kG.

From astrometric measurements by the Hipparcos spacecraft, HD 105382 is identified as a probable astrometric binary. It is only 267" away from δ Centauri, and both stars appear to be at the same distance from Earth and have the same motion through space, so they may be related. In total, this may be a five star system. It is a member of the Lower Centaurus–Crux (LCC) subgroup of the Scorpius–Centaurus association.
