= Delta Centauri =

Star in the constellation Centaurus

δ Centauri
- Location of δ Centauri (circled)

Observation data Epoch J2000 Equinox ICRS
- Constellation: Centaurus
- Right ascension: 12^{h} 08^{m} 21.49764^{s}
- Declination: −50° 43′ 20.7386″
- Apparent magnitude (V): +2.57 (2.51 - 2.65)

Characteristics
- Spectral type: B2Vne or B2 IVne
- U−B color index: −0.92
- B−V color index: −0.13
- Variable type: γ Cas

Astrometry
Radial velocity (R_{v})	+11 km/s
Proper motion (μ)	RA: −49.94< mas/yr Dec.: −7.19 mas/yr
Parallax (π)	7.86±0.47 mas
Distance	410 ± 20 ly (127 ± 8 pc)
Absolute magnitude (M_{V})	−2.94

Details
Mass	8.7±0.3 M_{☉}
Radius	8.18±0.16 R_{☉}
Luminosity	5,129 L_{☉}
Surface gravity (log g)	3.43±0.03 cgs
Temperature	22,230±650 K
Rotational velocity (v sin i)	263±14 km/s
Age	21.5±1.5 Myr

Other designations
- δ Cen, CD−50°6697, CPD−50°4862, FK5 452, HD 105435, HIP 59196, HR 4621, SAO 239689

Database references
SIMBAD	data

Delta Centauri is a star in the southern constellation of Centaurus. Its name is a Bayer designation that is Latinized from δ Centauri, and abbreviated Delta Cen or δ Cen. The apparent visual magnitude of this star is +2.57, making it readily visible to the naked eye. Based upon parallax measurements, it is located at a distance of about 410 light-years (130 parsecs) from the Earth. The star is drifting further away with a radial velocity of +11 km/s.

== Properties ==
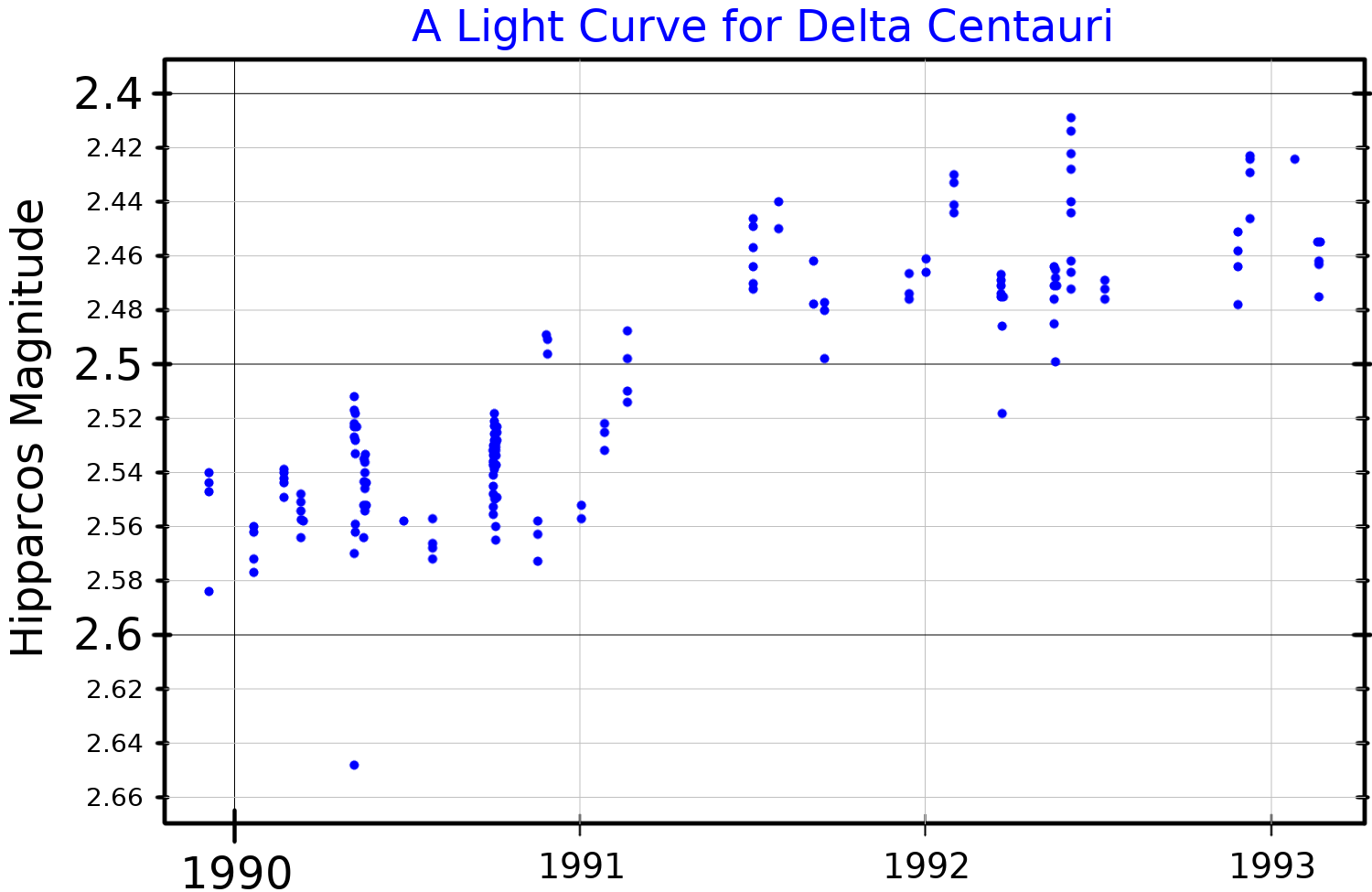
A light curve for Delta Centauri, plotted from Hipparcos data

δ Centauri is a shell star, with a distinctive spectrum created by material thrown off into a disk by its rapid rotation. It is also a variable star whose brightness varies from magnitude +2.51 to +2.65. It has been classified as a γ Cassiopeiae type variable. The energy from this star is being radiated at an effective temperature of over 22,000 K from the outer envelope, giving it the blue-white hue of a B-type star. It has a radius of 6.5 times the radius of the Sun and 8.7 times the Sun's mass.

The stellar classification of this star is B2Vne, which presents as a B-type main-sequence star. N. Houk in 1979 found a class of B2IVne, with the luminosity class of IV suggesting that this may be a subgiant star that has exhausted the hydrogen at its core and begun to evolve away from the main sequence. Detailed study of the spectrum suggests that the disparity is due to gravity darkening which makes the subgiant spectrum appear similar to a main-sequence star. The star is spinning rapidly, with the resulting Doppler effect giving its spectrum broad absorption lines as indicated by the 'n'. The suffix 'e' means this is a classical Be star, which is a type of hot star that has not yet evolved into a supergiant and is surrounded by circumstellar gas. The presence of this gas creates an excess emission of infrared, along with emission lines in the star's spectrum. Most of it is concentrated around the equator, forming a disk.

Some of the variation in this star may be explained by assuming it is a binary star system. This proposed secondary star would need to have about 4–7 times the Sun's mass and be orbiting with a period of at least 4.6 years at a minimum separation of 6.9 Astronomical Units. δ Centauri shares a common proper motion with the nearby stars HD 105382 and HD 105383, so they may form a small cluster or perhaps a triple star system. It is a proper motion member of the Lower Centaurus–Crux sub-group in the Scorpius–Centaurus OB association, the nearest such of association of co-moving massive stars to the Sun.

== Etymology ==
In Chinese, 馬尾 (Mǎ Wěi), meaning Horse's Tail, refers to an asterism consisting of δ Centauri, G Centauri and ρ Centauri. Consequently, δ Centauri itself is known as 馬尾三 (Mǎ Wěi sān, English: the Third Star of Horse's Tail.). From this Chinese name, the name Ma Wei appeared.

The people of Aranda and Luritja tribe around Hermannsburg, Central Australia, named Iritjinga, "The Eagle-hawk", a quadrangular arrangement comprising this star, γ Cen (Muhlifain), γ Cru (Gacrux), and δ Cru (Imai).

== See also ==
- Traditional Chinese star names
