= Y Centauri =

Variable star in the constellation Centaurus

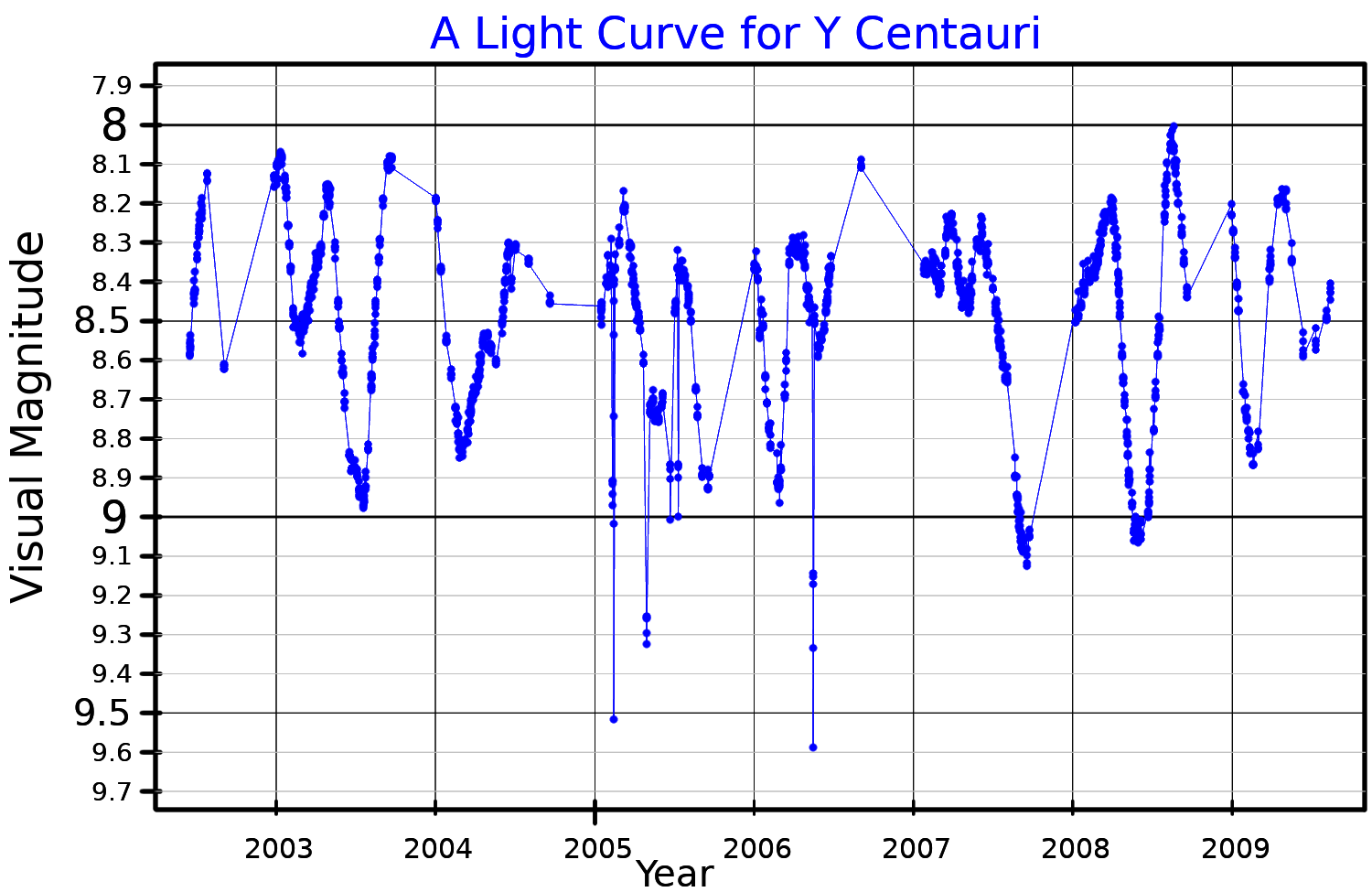
- A visual band light curve for Y Centauri, plotted from ASAS data

Observation data Epoch J2000.0 Equinox ICRS
- Constellation: Centaurus
- Right ascension: 14^{h} 30^{m} 58.61656^{s}
- Declination: −30° 05′ 51.8706″
- Apparent magnitude (V): 8.0 - 9.1

Characteristics
- Evolutionary stage: AGB
- Spectral type: M4e - M7
- U−B color index: +0.72
- B−V color index: +1.44
- Variable type: SRb

Astrometry
Radial velocity (R_{v})	−6.00 km/s
Proper motion (μ)	RA: −38.874 mas/yr Dec.: −25.867 mas/yr
Parallax (π)	4.4510±0.2738 mas
Distance	730 ± 50 ly (220 ± 10 pc)

Details
Radius	48 R_{☉}
Luminosity	330 L_{☉}
Surface gravity (log g)	−0.315 cgs
Temperature	3,557 K

Other designations
- Y Cen, HD 127233, BD−29°11116, HIP 70969, SAO 182618, GC 19563, IRAS 14280-2952, AAVSO 1425-29

Database references
SIMBAD	data

Y Centauri or Y Cen (HD 127233, HIP 70969) is a semiregular variable star in the constellation of Centaurus.

The variability in the star was discovered by Williamina Fleming in 1895 and published in the Third Catalogue of Variable Stars. The photographic magnitude range was given as 7.7 - 8.8, but the variability was described as "somewhat doubtful". It was later given the designation HV 52 in the Harvard Catalogue of Variable Stars. The General Catalogue of Variable Stars lists it as a semiregular variable star with a period of 180 days and a visual magnitude range of 8.0 - 9.1. A study of Hipparcos satellite photometry found a small amplitude range of 0.2 magnitudes at a visual magnitude of 8.53.

The distance of the star is poorly known. The revised Hipparcos annual parallax of 3.50 mas gives a distance of 900 light years. A study taking into account the variability of the star found a parallax of 5.57 mas, corresponding to a distance of 585 light years. Both estimates have a margin of error over 20%. The Gaia Data Release 2 parallax lies between these two values and appears more accurate with a margin of error around 5%, but with a large value for astrometric noise. Gaia EDR3 does not list a parallax for this star.

Y Centauri is an asymptotic giant branch star 330 times as luminous as the sun. Its spectral type varies between M4 and M7 as it pulsates.

The star has been observed to produce 22 GHz water maser emission, although later searches did not find any maser emission.
