= V763 Centauri =

Star in the constellation Centaurus

C^{1} Centauri
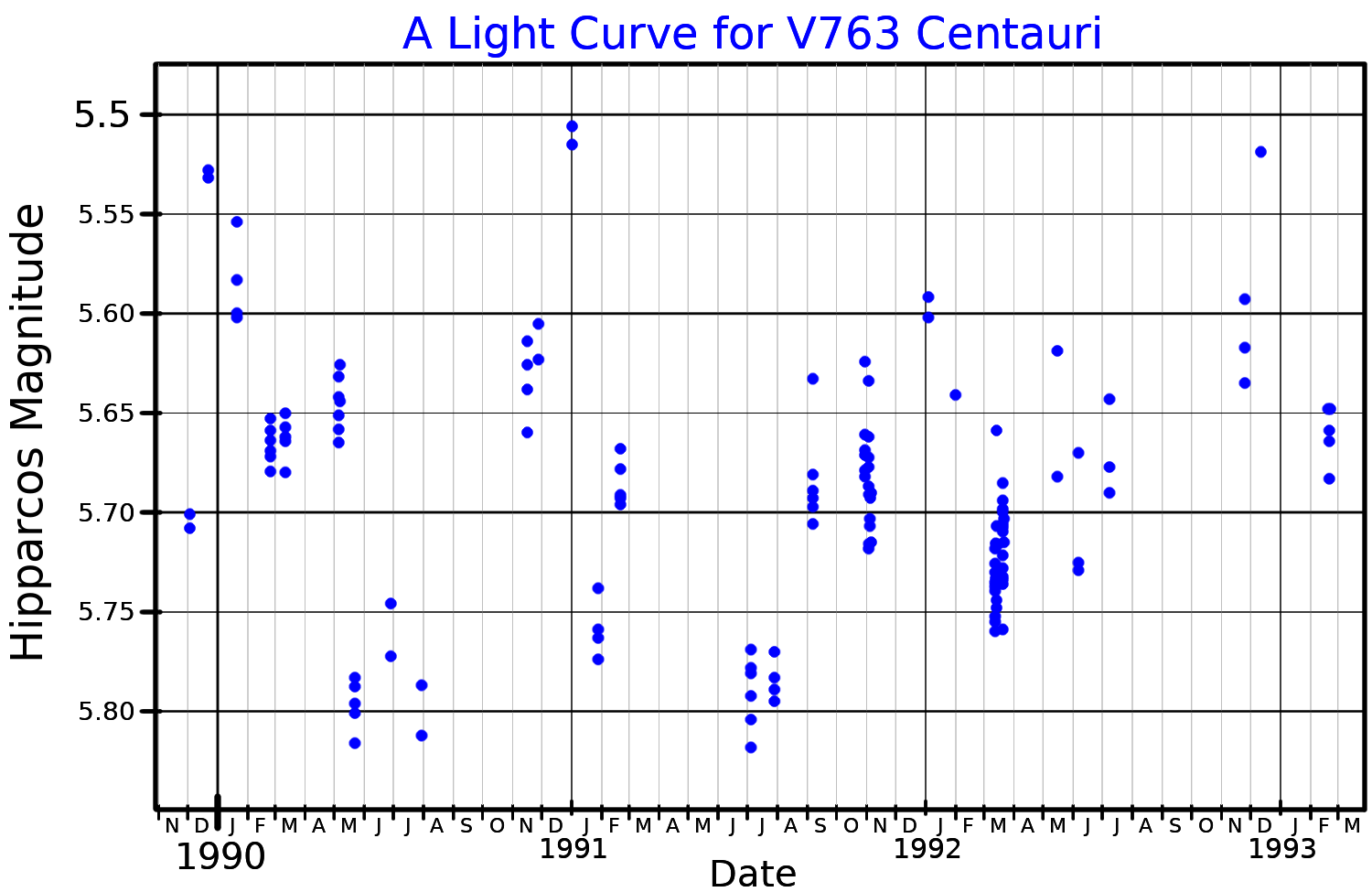
- A light curve for V763 Centauri, plotted from Hipparcos data

Observation data Epoch J2000.0 Equinox J2000.0
- Constellation: Centaurus
- Right ascension: 11^{h} 35^{m} 13.28134^{s}
- Declination: −47° 22′ 21.2888″
- Apparent magnitude (V): +5.64

Characteristics
- Evolutionary stage: AGB
- Spectral type: M3/4III
- B−V color index: +1.682±0.019
- Variable type: Lb

Astrometry
Radial velocity (R_{v})	+21.07±0.29 km/s
Proper motion (μ)	RA: -87.503 mas/yr Dec.: -6.988 mas/yr
Parallax (π)	5.4236±0.1476 mas
Distance	600 ± 20 ly (184 ± 5 pc)
Absolute magnitude (M_{V})	−1.05

Details
Radius	64.7+5.9 −4.3 R_{☉}
Luminosity	754±24 L_{☉}
Temperature	3,761+130 −161 K

Other designations
- C^{1} Cen, V763 Centauri, CD−46°7199, GC 15886, HD 100733, HIP 56518, HR 4463, SAO 222887, CCDM J11352-4722

Database references
SIMBAD	data

C^{1} Centauri is a single star in the southern constellation of Centaurus. It has the variable star designation V763 Centauri, while C^{1} Centauri is the Bayer designation. The star has a red hue and is dimly visibly to the naked eye with an apparent visual magnitude that fluctuates around +5.64. It is located at a distance of approximately 600 light years based on parallax, and has an absolute magnitude of −1.05. It is drifting further away with a radial velocity of +21 km/s. At one time it was a candidate member of the Zeta Herculis Moving Group but has since been excluded.

This object is an aging red giant star on the asymptotic giant branch with a stellar classification of M3/4III. Samus et al. (2017) classify this as a slow irregular variable of sub-type Lb and its brightness varies from magnitude +5.52 down to +5.82. It was previously classified as a semiregular variable of sub-type SRb. With the supply of hydrogen and helium at its core exhausted, the star has expanded until now it has 65 times the radius of the Sun. It is radiating 754 times the luminosity of the Sun from its photosphere at an effective temperature of 3,761 K.
