= HD 116243 =

Bright giant star in the constellation Centaurus

m Centauri
- Location of m Centauri (circled in red)

Observation data Epoch J2000.0 Equinox ICRS
- Constellation: Centaurus
- Right ascension: 13^{h} 24^{m} 00.48075^{s}
- Declination: −64° 32′ 08.4097″
- Apparent magnitude (V): +4.52

Characteristics
- Spectral type: G5IIb
- B−V color index: 0.822±0.030

Astrometry
Radial velocity (R_{v})	+13.26±0.13 km/s
Proper motion (μ)	RA: +29.793 mas/yr Dec.: −21.465 mas/yr
Parallax (π)	13.3749±0.1716 mas
Distance	244 ± 3 ly (74.8 ± 1.0 pc)
Absolute magnitude (M_{V})	0.01

Details
Mass	1.4 M_{☉}
Radius	11.6+0.2 −2.6 R_{☉}
Luminosity	88.8±1.3 L_{☉}
Surface gravity (log g)	2.97 cgs
Temperature	5,197+704 −51 K
Metallicity [Fe/H]	−0.13 dex
Rotational velocity (v sin i)	4.3 km/s

Other designations
- m Cen, CPD−63°2732, FK5 2985, GC 18107, HD 116243, HIP 65387, HR 5041, SAO 252293

Database references
SIMBAD	data

HD 116243 is a single star in the southern constellation of Centaurus. It has the Bayer designation m Centauri, while HD 116243 is the identifier from the Henry Draper catalogue. This star has a yellow hue and is faintly visible to the naked eye with an apparent visual magnitude of +4.52. It is located at a distance of approximately 244 light years from the Sun based on parallax, and it has an absolute magnitude of 0.01. It is drifting further away with a radial velocity of +13.3 km/s.

This object is an aging bright giant star with a stellar classification of G5IIb With the supply of hydrogen at its core exhausted, it has expanded to 12 times the radius of the Sun. The star is radiating 89 times the luminosity of the Sun from its enlarged photosphere at an effective temperature of 5,197 K.
