= Omicron Centaurids =

Meteor shower

The Omicron Centaurids meteor shower has a radiant which is in the constellation Centaurus which is visible from the southern hemisphere. It is most easily seen at 2:00 am, local standard time. It is visible from late January through February each year. It peaks in mid-February.
