= HD 129685 =

Star in the constellation Centaurus

c^{2} Centauri
- Location of c^{2} Centauri (circled in red)

Observation data Epoch J2000.0 Equinox J2000.0
- Constellation: Centaurus
- Right ascension: 14^{h} 44^{m} 59.20164^{s}
- Declination: −35° 11′ 30.5833″
- Apparent magnitude (V): +4.92

Characteristics
- Evolutionary stage: main sequence
- Spectral type: A0IVnn or A0Vn
- B−V color index: +0.013±0.006

Astrometry
| Radial velocity (R_{v}) | −5.0±2.8 km/s |
| Proper motion (μ) | RA: +9.411 mas/yr Dec.: −3.426 mas/yr |
| Parallax (π) | 14.2784±0.1299 mas |
| Distance | 228 ± 2 ly (70.0 ± 0.6 pc) |
| Absolute magnitude (M_{V}) | 0.83 |

Details
| Mass | 2.10+0.12 −0.09 M_{☉} |
| Radius | 2.87 R_{☉} |
| Luminosity | 44.73 L_{☉} |
| Surface gravity (log g) | 3.80±0.14 cgs |
| Temperature | 9,323 K |
| Rotational velocity (v sin i) | 455 km/s |
| Age | 239+143 −144 Myr |

Other designations
- c^{2} Cen, CD−34°9888, GC 19845, HD 129685, HIP 72104, HR 5489, SAO 205899

Database references
| SIMBAD | data |

HD 129685 is a single star in the southern constellation of Centaurus. It is also known by its Bayer designation c^{2} Centauri, while HD 129685 is the star's identifier in the Henry Draper catalogue. This object has a white hue and is faintly visible to the naked eye with an apparent visual magnitude of +4.92. It is located at a distance of approximately 231 light years from the Sun based on parallax, and it has an absolute magnitude of 0.83. The star is drifting closer with a radial velocity of around −5 km/s.

Two different stellar classifications have been reported for this star. A class of A0Vn assigned by Abt and Morrell (1995) indicates it is a rapidly-rotating A-type main-sequence star, while a type of A0IVnn, according to Gray and Garrison (1987), suggests it is a somewhat more evolved subgiant star. It is around 239 million years old with 2.1 times the mass of the Sun, and is reported to be rotating close to its break-up velocity. The star is radiating 45 times the luminosity of the Sun from its photosphere at an effective temperature of 9,323 K.
