= HD 100825 =

Star in the constellation Centaurus

C^{2} Centauri
Observation data Epoch J2000.0 Equinox ICRS
- Constellation: Centaurus
- Right ascension: 11^{h} 35^{m} 55.58491^{s}
- Declination: −47° 38′ 29.9038″
- Apparent magnitude (V): +5.26

Characteristics
- Evolutionary stage: main sequence
- Spectral type: F0V or A7m
- B−V color index: +0.257±0.003

Astrometry
Radial velocity (R_{v})	+5.2±2.8 km/s
Proper motion (μ)	RA: +33.654 mas/yr Dec.: −49.433 mas/yr
Parallax (π)	17.1828±0.0741 mas
Distance	189.8 ± 0.8 ly (58.2 ± 0.3 pc)
Absolute magnitude (M_{V})	+1.31

Details
Mass	1.62 M_{☉}
Radius	2.83 R_{☉}
Luminosity	21 L_{☉}
Surface gravity (log g)	3.97±0.14 cgs
Temperature	7,737±263 K
Age	467 Myr

Other designations
- C^{2} Cen, CD−46°7205, FK5 435, GC 15901, HD 100825, HIP 56573, HR 4466, SAO 222895

Database references
SIMBAD	data

HD 100825 is a single star in the southern constellation of Centaurus. It has the Bayer designation C^{2} Centauri, while HD 100825 is the identifier from the Henry Draper catalogue. The star has a yellow-white hue and is dimly visible to the naked eye with an apparent visual magnitude of +5.26. It is located at a distance of 187 light years from the Sun based on parallax, with an absolute magnitude of +1.31. The radial velocity is poorly constrained, but the star appears to be drifting further away from the Sun at the rate of around 5 km/s. It is a member of the Sirius supercluster of co-moving stars.

This is an Am star or metallic-line star with a stellar classification of F0V, indicating it is a F-type main-sequence star that is generating energy by core hydrogen fusion. It is an estimated 467 million years old and has 1.62 times the mass of the Sun. The star is radiating 21 times the luminosity of the Sun from its photosphere at an effective temperature of 7,737 K.
