= Fourcade-Figueroa Object =

Irregular galaxy in constellation Centaurus

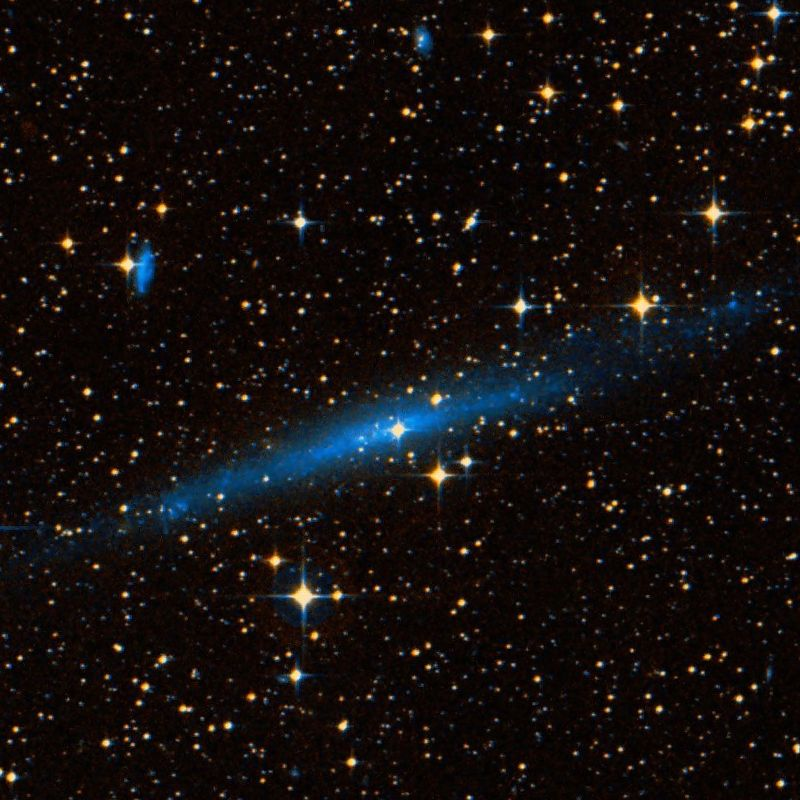
- The Fourcade-Figueroa Object known as ESO 270-17

Observation data (J2000 epoch)
- Constellation: Centaurus
- Right ascension: 13^{h} 34^{m} 46.80^{s}
- Declination: −45° 32′ 50.4″
- Redshift: 0.002762
- Heliocentric radial velocity: 828 km/s
- Distance: 51.5 Mly (15.78 Mpc)
- Apparent magnitude (V): 0.30
- Apparent magnitude (B): 0.40

Characteristics
- Type: SB(s)m
- Size: 165,000 ly (estimated)
- Apparent size (V): 15.12' x 1.68'

Other designations
- ESO 270-017, PGC 47847, MCG -07-28-004

The Fourcade-Figueroa Object, also known as ESO 270-17 or the FF galaxy, is an edge-on irregular galaxy located in the constellation of Centaurus. It is located 51 million light years from Earth. The galaxy has a luminosity class of V with a broad HI line. It is also classified as a low-surface brightness galaxy (LSB) and is located near from the radio galaxy NGC 5128, also known as Centaurus A.

== Discovery and observation ==
The Fourcade-Figueroa Object was discovered in May 1970, by two astronomers, Carlos Raúl Fourcade from Argentina and Egardo Javier Figueroa from Chile while capturing the Centaurus A region with a Curtis-Schmidt camera at Cerro Tololo Inter-American Observatory. This discovery prompted both Fourcade and Figueroa to name the object after themselves.

For seven years, the Fourcade-Figueroa Object appears to be diffused and elongated. According to Dottori and Fourcade, it is said to be associated with Centaurus A as a shred (a galactic remnant resulting from a galaxy merger). In the year 1978, Graham reached a conclusion and found the object is a late-type galaxy. In the Second Reference Catalogue, the Fourcade-Figueroa Object has been catalogued as A 1332–45. It is very faint to observe, even using an amateur telescope.

== Characteristics ==
The Fourcade-Figueroa Object seems to be a stellar remnant caused by a progenitor spiral galaxy undergoing a galaxy shredding process with Centaurus A. As a result, a dwarf elliptical galaxy, NGC 5237, is created from its core while the rest of the galaxy's material became the object, it is known today. The Fourcade-Figueroa Object is found to be large with knots of resolved stars extending along the major axis by a distance of 15 arc minutes. According to Holmberg, the Fourcade-Figueroa Object has a dimensions of 17 x 2 arcmin. It has an inclination angle between 86 and 90 degrees and is surrounded by a cloud of neutral hydrogen, that is dissolving its mass by 5%.

The Fourcade-Figueroa Object is classified as a proto-typical superthin galaxy. When observed at both optical and HI wavelengths, the object is disrupted when seen towards the northwest side. It is also known to have its thickness of gas showing a steep gas flare in agreement with the stellar disk edge. Based on the Navarro-Frenk-White dark matter distribution and a pseudo-isothermal halo models, the Fourcade-Figueroa Object contains a compact core of dark matter. This indicates the reason why the galaxy has a superthin stellar disk structure.
