= Psi Centauri =

Binary star system in the constellation Centaurus

- Location of ψ Centauri (circled)

Observation data Epoch J2000.0 Equinox ICRS
- Constellation: Centaurus
- Right ascension: 14^{h} 20^{m} 33.43^{s}
- Declination: −37° 53′ 07.1″
- Apparent magnitude (V): +4.05

Characteristics
- Spectral type: A0 IV (B9 and A2)
- U−B color index: −0.11
- B−V color index: −0.03
- Variable type: eclipsing

Astrometry
| Radial velocity (R_{v}) | 1.8±0.9 km/s |
| Proper motion (μ) | RA: −63.69±0.18 mas/yr Dec.: −10.65±0.15 mas/yr |
| Parallax (π) | 13.049±0.063 mas |
| Distance | 250.0±1.2 ly (76.64±0.37 pc) |
| Absolute magnitude (M_{V}) | −0.35±0.14 |

Orbit
| Period (P) | 38.8121(2) d |
| Semi-major axis (a) | 0.3874±0.0017 AU |
| Eccentricity (e) | 0.550±0.001 |
| Inclination (i) | 89.20±0.13° |
| Longitude of the node (Ω) | 115.79±0.10° |
| Argument of periastron (ω) (secondary) | 19.45±0.27° |
| Semi-amplitude (K_{1}) (primary) | 49.51±0.16 km/s |
| Semi-amplitude (K_{2}) (secondary) | 80.48±0.33 km/s |

Details

ψ Cen A
| Mass | 3.187±0.031 M_{☉} |
| Radius | 3.814±0.007 R_{☉} |
| Luminosity | 140+17 −15 L_{☉} |
| Surface gravity (log g) | 3.811±0.003 cgs |
| Temperature | 10,450±300 K |
| Metallicity [Fe/H] | +0.05±0.10 dex |
| Rotation | 1.49±0.26 d |
| Rotational velocity (v sin i) | 123.7 km/s |
| Age | 280±10 Myr |

ψ Cen B
| Mass | 1.961±0.015 M_{☉} |
| Radius | 1.896±0.004 R_{☉} |
| Luminosity | 17.5+2.6 −2.2 L_{☉} |
| Surface gravity (log g) | 4.206±0.007 cgs |
| Temperature | 8,800±300 K |
| Metallicity [Fe/H] | +0.05±0.10 dex |
| Rotational velocity (v sin i) | 126.9 km/s |
| Age | 280±10 Myr |

Other designations
- ψ Cen, CD−37°9336, FK5 1373, GC 19337, HD 125473, HIP 70090, HR 5367, SAO 205453, CCDM J14206-3753, WDS J14206-3753

Database references
| SIMBAD | data |

Psi Centauri is a binary star system in the southern constellation of Centaurus. Its name is a Bayer designation that is Latinized from ψ Centauri, and abbreviated Psi Cen or ψ Cen. This system is visible to the naked eye as a point of light with a baseline apparent visual magnitude of +4.05. The distance to this system is 250 light years based on parallax. The radial velocity is poorly constrained, but it appears to be slowly drifting away from the Sun at the rate of +2 km/s.

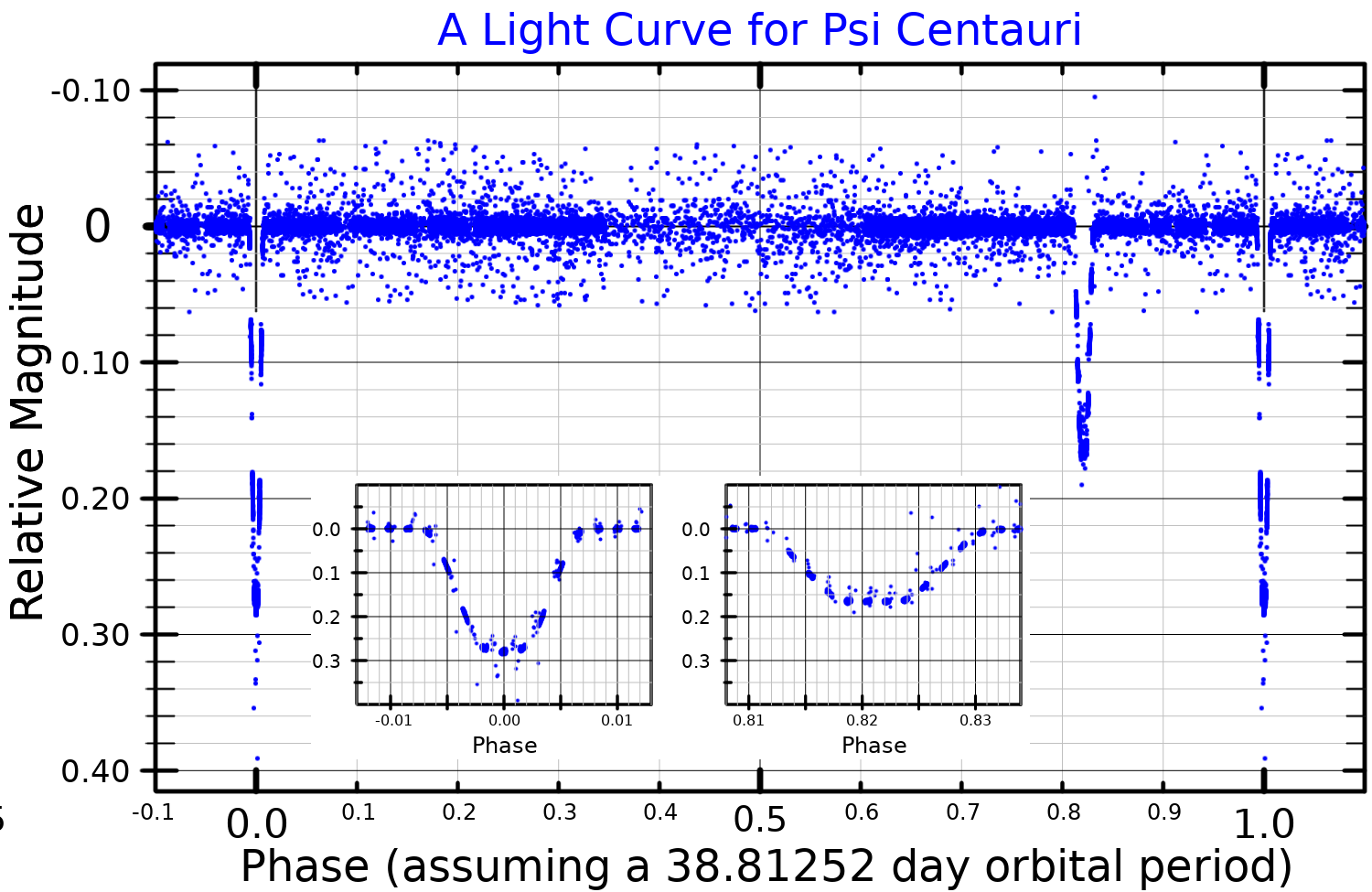
A light curve for Psi Centauri, plotted from data published by Bruntt et al. (2006)

This is a detached eclipsing binary system with the secondary eclipse being total. The pair are orbiting each other with a period of 38.81 days and an eccentricity of 0.55.The brightness of the system dips by 0.28 and 0.16 magnitude during the two eclipses per orbit. The system displays an infrared excess at a wavelength of 60 μm, indicating the presence of a circumstellar debris disk with a temperature of 120 K, orbiting at a distance of 64 AU.

The pair have a combined stellar classification of A0 IV, matching a white-hued A-type subgiant. The two components appear to be at different evolutionary stages. Both have high rotation rates, with projected rotational velocities over 120 km/s. The primary has 3.814 times the Sun's radius while the secondary is 1.896 times. The primary showed evidence of pulsational behavior with 1.996 and 5.127 cycles per day, which suggests it is a slowly pulsating B star. But this remains unconfirmed as of 2017, and the finding may instead be the result of instrumental error.
