= 1 Centauri =

Yellow-white-hued star in the constellation Centaurus

- Location of 1 Centauri (circled in red)

Observation data Epoch J2000.0 Equinox ICRS
- Constellation: Centaurus
- Right ascension: 13^{h} 45^{m} 41.24482^{s}
- Declination: −33° 02′ 37.3997″
- Apparent magnitude (V): +4.23

Characteristics
- Evolutionary stage: main sequence
- Spectral type: F2 V
- U−B color index: +0.00
- B−V color index: +0.38

Astrometry
Radial velocity (R_{v})	−21.5±0.6 km/s
Proper motion (μ)	RA: −462.49±0.18 mas/yr Dec.: −146.49±0.16 mas/yr
Parallax (π)	51.54±0.19 mas
Distance	63.3 ± 0.2 ly (19.40 ± 0.07 pc)
Absolute magnitude (M_{V})	+2.81

Orbit
Period (P)	9.94480±0.00441 d
Eccentricity (e)	0.247±0.105
Periastron epoch (T)	2,422,737.382 ± 3.35 JD
Argument of periastron (ω) (secondary)	137.7±25.4°
Semi-amplitude (K_{1}) (primary)	6.00±0.75 km/s

Details
Mass	1.35 M_{☉}
Radius	1.86 R_{☉}
Luminosity (bolometric)	5.857 L_{☉}
Surface gravity (log g)	4.25±0.14 cgs
Temperature	6,898±235 K
Metallicity [Fe/H]	−0.09 dex
Rotation	2.42±0.22
Rotational velocity (v sin i)	86 km/s
Age	1.193 Gyr

Other designations
- i Centauri, 1 Centauri, CD−32°9603, FK5 506, GC 18593, GJ 525.1, HD 119756, HIP 67153, HR 5168, SAO 204812

Database references
SIMBAD	data

1 Centauri, or i Centauri, is a yellowhite-hued binary star system in the southern constellation Centaurus. It can be seen with the naked eye, having an apparent visual magnitude of +4.23. Based upon an annual parallax shift of 51.54 mas as seen from Earth's orbit, it is located 63.3 light-years from the Sun. The system is moving closer to the Sun with a radial velocity of −21.5 km/s.

Spectrographic images taken at the Cape Observatory between 1921 and 1923 showed this star has a variable radial velocity, which indicated this is a single-lined spectroscopic binary star system. The pair have an orbital period of 9.94 days and an eccentricity of about 0.2.

The primary component has received a number of different stellar classifications. For example, Jaschek et al. (1964) lists F0V, F2III, F4III and F4IV, thus ranging in evolutionary state from an ordinary F-type main-sequence star to a giant star. More recently, Houk (1982) listed a class of F3 V, matching an ordinary main-sequence star that is generating energy through hydrogen fusion at its core. The NStars project gives it a classification of F2 V.
