= HD 129456 =

Star in the constellation Centaurus

c^{1} Centauri
- Location of c^{1} Centauri (circled in red)

Observation data Epoch J2000.0 Equinox ICRS
- Constellation: Centaurus
- Right ascension: 14^{h} 43^{m} 39.44^{s}
- Declination: −35° 10′ 25.2″
- Apparent magnitude (V): +4.06

Characteristics
- Evolutionary stage: red giant branch
- Spectral type: K3III
- U−B color index: +1.53
- B−V color index: +1.356
- Variable type: none

Astrometry
Radial velocity (R_{v})	−38 km/s
Proper motion (μ)	RA: −61.46±0.15 mas/yr Dec.: −176.84±0.14 mas/yr
Parallax (π)	15.57±0.16 mas
Distance	209 ± 2 ly (64.2 ± 0.7 pc)
Absolute magnitude (M_{V})	−0.20

Details
Mass	1.23 M_{☉}
Radius	25 R_{☉}
Luminosity	174 L_{☉}
Surface gravity (log g)	1.86 cgs
Temperature	4,240 K
Metallicity [Fe/H]	−0.20 dex

Other designations
- HR 5485, HD 129456, CD−34°9868, FK5 544, HIP 72010, SAO 205871, GC 19820

Database references
SIMBAD	data

HD 129456, also known by its Bayer designation c^{1} Centauri (c^{1} Cen), is a star in the constellation Centaurus. c¹ Centauri is an orange K-type giant with an apparent magnitude of +4.06. It is approximately 209 light years from Earth.
