= G Centauri =

Star in the constellation Centaurus

- Location of G Centauri (circled in red)

Observation data Epoch J2000 Equinox ICRS
- Constellation: Centaurus
- Right ascension: 12^{h} 26^{m} 31.75955^{s}
- Declination: −51° 27′ 02.2899″
- Apparent magnitude (V): 4.82

Characteristics
- Spectral type: B3V(n)
- B−V color index: −0.141±0.002

Astrometry
Radial velocity (R_{v})	+5.0±4.2 km/s
Proper motion (μ)	RA: −30.66 mas/yr Dec.: −10.13 mas/yr
Parallax (π)	7.28±0.24 mas
Distance	450 ± 10 ly (137 ± 5 pc)
Absolute magnitude (M_{V})	−0.87

Details
Mass	6.2±0.1 M_{☉}
Radius	3.42 R_{☉}
Luminosity	483.06 L_{☉}
Temperature	13,732 K
Metallicity [Fe/H]	−0.38±0.06 dex
Rotational velocity (v sin i)	298±12 km/s
Age	15.8±0.2 Myr

Other designations
- G Cen, CD−50°6975, GC 16954, HD 108257, HIP 60710, HR 4732, SAO 239948, CCDM J12265-5127

Database references
SIMBAD	data

G Centauri is a single star in the southern constellation of Centaurus. It is visible to the naked eye as a faint, blue-white hued star with an apparent visual magnitude of +4.82. This object is located approximately 450 light years from the Sun, based on parallax. It is a member of the Lower Centaurus–Crux group of the Scorpius–Centaurus association, with the former having an age of about 17 million years.

This object is a B-type main-sequence star with a stellar classification of B3V(n), where the 'n' indicates "nebulous" (broad) lines due to rapid rotation. It is around 16 million years old with a projected rotational velocity of up to 298 km/s. The star has six times the mass of the Sun and 3.4 times the Sun's radius. It is radiating 483 times the luminosity of the Sun from its photosphere at an effective temperature of 13,732 K. An infrared excess indicates a circumstellar disk of dust with a mean temperature of 50 K is orbiting the star at a separation of 717.8 AU.
