= 4 Centauri =

Star in the constellation Centaurus

- Location of 4 Centauri (circled in red)

Observation data Epoch J2000.0 Equinox ICRS
- Constellation: Centaurus
- A
- Right ascension: 13^{h} 53^{m} 12.53829^{s}
- Declination: −31° 55′ 39.4304″
- Apparent magnitude (V): +4.72
- B
- Right ascension: 13^{h} 53^{m} 12.43506^{s}
- Declination: −31° 55′ 54.1506″
- Apparent magnitude (V): +8.47)

Characteristics

A
- Evolutionary stage: main sequence
- Spectral type: B6IV
- U−B color index: −0.56
- B−V color index: −0.14

B
- Evolutionary stage: main sequence
- Spectral type: Am
- U−B color index: +0.10
- B−V color index: +0.30

Astrometry

A
Radial velocity (R_{v})	+5.2±2 km/s
Proper motion (μ)	RA: −10.428 mas/yr Dec.: −10.710 mas/yr
Parallax (π)	4.8225±0.1539 mas
Distance	680 ± 20 ly (207 ± 7 pc)
Absolute magnitude (M_{V})	−1.66

B
Radial velocity (R_{v})	+9±10 km/s
Proper motion (μ)	RA: −10.905 mas/yr Dec.: −10.625 mas/yr
Parallax (π)	4.1269±0.1312 mas
Distance	790 ± 30 ly (242 ± 8 pc)

Orbit
Primary	4 Cen Aa
Name	4 Cen Ab
Period (P)	6.930137±0.000015 d
Eccentricity (e)	0.25±0.10
Argument of periastron (ω) (secondary)	152±17°
Semi-amplitude (K_{1}) (primary)	21.0±1.5 km/s

Orbit
Primary	4 Cen Ba
Name	4 Cen Bb
Period (P)	4.8390±0.0001 d
Eccentricity (e)	0.05±0.02
Periastron epoch (T)	2442916.55±0.09
Argument of periastron (ω) (secondary)	51±20°
Semi-amplitude (K_{1}) (primary)	16.9±3.5 km/s

Details

Aa
Mass	7.7 M_{☉}
Radius	6.2 R_{☉}
Luminosity	687 L_{☉}
Surface gravity (log g)	3.43 cgs
Temperature	14,322 K
Metallicity [Fe/H]	−1.06 dex
Rotation	27.2 days
Age	51 Myr

Ab
Mass	0.75 M_{☉}

Details

Ba
Mass	1.9 M_{☉}
Radius	2.48 R_{☉}
Luminosity	17.0 L_{☉}
Surface gravity (log g)	3.88 cgs
Temperature	7,440 K

Bb
Mass	0.22 M_{☉}

Other designations
- h Cen, 4 Cen, HD 120955, HR 5221, CCDM J13532-3156
- A: CD−31°10729, GC 18755, HIP 67786, SAO 204944
- B: CD−31°10727, GC 18754, SAO 204943

Database references
SIMBAD	data
- 4 Cen B

4 Centauri is a multiple star in the constellation Centaurus, approximately 640 light years from Earth. It has a combined apparent magnitude of +4.71. The primary is a blue-white B-type subgiant with a spectroscopic companion, while the secondary is an Am star also with a spectroscopic companion.

4 Centauri is a hierarchical quadruple star system. The primary component of the system, 4 Centauri A, is a spectroscopic binary, meaning that its components cannot be resolved but periodic Doppler shifts in its spectrum show that it must be orbiting. 4 Centauri A has an orbital period of 6.927 days and an eccentricity of 0.23. Because light from only one of the stars can be detected (i.e. it is a single-lined spectroscopic binary), some parameters such as its inclination are unknown. The secondary component, is also a single-lined spectroscopic binary. It has an orbital period of 4.839 days and an eccentricity of 0.05. The secondary component is a metallic-lined A-type star. The two pairs themselves are separated by 14 arcseconds; one orbit would take at least 55,000 years.
