= Tau Centauri =

Star in the constellation Centaurus

τ Centauri
- Location of τ Centauri (circled)

Observation data Epoch J2000.0 Equinox J2000.0 (ICRS)
- Constellation: Centaurus
- Right ascension: 12^{h} 37^{m} 42.164^{s}
- Declination: −48° 32′ 28.70″
- Apparent magnitude (V): +3.86

Characteristics
- Spectral type: A0 V or A1 IVnn
- U−B color index: +0.04
- B−V color index: +0.06

Astrometry
Radial velocity (R_{v})	+5.5±2.3 km/s
Proper motion (μ)	RA: −186.081 mas/yr Dec.: −6.757 mas/yr
Parallax (π)	24.2953±0.53 mas
Distance	134 ± 3 ly (41.2 ± 0.9 pc)
Absolute magnitude (M_{V})	+0.83

Details
Mass	2.31 M_{☉}
Radius	2.7 R_{☉}
Luminosity	39 L_{☉}
Surface gravity (log g)	4.02±0.14 cgs
Temperature	10,533±358 K
Rotational velocity (v sin i)	296.8±3.8 km/s
Age	132 Myr

Other designations
- τ Cen, CD−47°7745, HD 109787, HIP 61622, HR 4802, SAO 223560

Database references
SIMBAD	data

Tau Centauri is a solitary star in the southern constellation of Centaurus. Its name is a Bayer designation that is Latinized from τ Centauri, and abbreviated Tau Cen or τ Cen. This star is visible to the naked eye with an apparent visual magnitude of +3.86. The distance to this star, based upon an annual parallax shift of 24.3 mas, is 131 light years. It makes a star system with Gamma Centauri at 98% probability, both separated by 1.7 ly (0.53 pc).

This is an A-type star with stellar classifications of A0 V or A1 IVnn, indicating it may be a main sequence star or a more evolved subgiant star. It is around 132 million years old and is spinning rapidly with a projected rotational velocity of 296.8 km/s. This is giving the star an oblate shape, with an estimated equatorial girth that is 30% larger than the polar radius. The star has an estimated 2.3 times the mass of the Sun and 2.7 times the Sun's radius.
