= Upsilon2 Centauri =

Binary star system in the constellation Centaurus

Upsilon^{2} Centauri
- Location of υ^{2} Centauri (circled in red)

Observation data Epoch J2000.0 Equinox J2000.0 (ICRS)
- Constellation: Centaurus
- Right ascension: 14^{h} 01^{m} 43.49909 ^{s}
- Declination: −45° 36′ 12.2767″
- Apparent magnitude (V): +4.33

Characteristics
- Spectral type: F7 II/III
- U−B color index: +0.26
- B−V color index: +0.61
- Variable type: None

Astrometry
Radial velocity (R_{v})	−7.8±7.4 km/s
Proper motion (μ)	RA: +8.64±1.09 mas/yr Dec.: −16.25±0.88 mas/yr
Parallax (π)	2.57±1.05 mas
Distance	approx. 1,300 ly (approx. 400 pc)
Absolute magnitude (M_{V})	−3.51

Orbit
Period (P)	207.357 d
Eccentricity (e)	0.55
Periastron epoch (T)	2423880.5 JD
Argument of periastron (ω) (secondary)	88°
Semi-amplitude (K_{1}) (primary)	12.7 km/s

Details
Mass	6.86±0.39 M_{☉}
Luminosity (bolometric)	3,919 L_{☉}
Surface gravity (log g)	2.00 cgs
Temperature	6,495 K
Rotational velocity (v sin i)	0.0 km/s
Age	45.9±4.0 Myr

Other designations
- υ^{2} Cen, CD−44°9040, GC 18939, HD 122223, HIP 68523, HR 5260, SAO 224621

Database references
SIMBAD	data

Upsilon^{2} Centauri is a binary star system in the southern constellation Centaurus. Its name is a Bayer designation that is Latinized from υ^{2} Centauri, and abbreviated Upsilon^{2} Cen or υ^{2} Cen. This system is visible to the naked eye as a point of light with a combined apparent visual magnitude of +4.33. Based upon an annual parallax shift of 2.57 mas as seen from Earth, this star is located roughly 1,300 light years from the Sun. Relative to its neighbors, the system has a peculiar velocity of 39.2+8.8
−15.2 km/s and it may form a runaway star system.

This is a single-lined spectroscopic binary star system with an orbital period of 207.357 days and an eccentricity of 0.55. The primary component has the spectrum of an evolved F-type giant/bright giant hybrid with a stellar classification of F7 II/III. It is around 46 million years old with 6.9 times the mass of the Sun. The star is radiating 3,919 times the Sun's luminosity from its photosphere at an effective temperature of 6,495 K.
