= Upsilon1 Centauri =

Star in the constellation Centaurus

υ^{1} Centauri
- Location of υ^{1} Centauri (circled in red)

Observation data Epoch J2000.0 Equinox J2000.0
- Constellation: Centaurus
- Right ascension: 13^{h} 58^{m} 40.75^{s}
- Declination: −44° 48′ 12.9″
- Apparent magnitude (V): +3.87

Characteristics
- Spectral type: B2 IV/V
- B−V color index: −0.208±0.011

Astrometry
Radial velocity (R_{v})	+9.2±1.4 km/s
Proper motion (μ)	RA: −27.51±0.15 mas/yr Dec.: −22.44±0.13 mas/yr
Parallax (π)	7.63±0.16 mas
Distance	427 ± 9 ly (131 ± 3 pc)
Absolute magnitude (M_{V})	−1.72

Details
Mass	7.9±0.1 M_{☉}
Radius	3.74±0.34 R_{☉}
Luminosity	1,884 L_{☉}
Surface gravity (log g)	4.15±0.07 cgs
Temperature	21,411±377 K
Rotational velocity (v sin i)	124 km/s
Age	13.0±2.0 Myr

Other designations
- υ^{1} Cen, CD−44°9010, FK5 3112, HD 121790, HIP 68282, HR 5249, SAO 224585

Database references
SIMBAD	data

Upsilon^{1} Centauri is a single star in the southern constellation of Centaurus. Its name is a Bayer designation that is Latinized from υ^{1} Centauri, and abbreviated Upsilon^{1} Cen or υ^{1} Cen. This star has a blue-white hue and is visible to the naked eye with an apparent visual magnitude of +3.87. The distance to this object is approximately 427 light years based on parallax, and is receding with a radial velocity of +9 km/s. It is a member of the Lower Centaurus Crux group of the Scorpius–Centaurus association.

The stellar classification of this object is B2 IV/V, matching a massive B-type star with a luminosity class displaying mixed traits of a main sequence and a subgiant star. It is 13 million years old and is spinning with a projected rotational velocity of 124 km/s. The star has 7.9 times the mass of the Sun and 3.7 times the Sun's radius. It is radiating 1,884 times the luminosity of the Sun from its photosphere at an effective temperature of 21,411 K.
