= Eta Centauri =

Star in the constellation Centaurus

- Location of η Centauri (circled)

Observation data Epoch J2000.0 Equinox ICRS
- Constellation: Centaurus
- Right ascension: 14^{h} 35^{m} 30.42416^{s}
- Declination: −42° 09′ 28.1708″
- Apparent magnitude (V): +2.35 (2.30 - 2.41)

Characteristics
- Spectral type: B1.5 Vne
- U−B color index: −0.862
- B−V color index: −0.215
- Variable type: GCAS + LERI

Astrometry
Radial velocity (R_{v})	−0.2 km/s
Proper motion (μ)	RA: −34.73 mas/yr Dec.: −32.72 mas/yr
Parallax (π)	10.67±0.21 mas
Distance	306 ± 6 ly (94 ± 2 pc)
Absolute magnitude (M_{V})	−2.53

Details
Mass	12.0±0.3 M_{☉}
Radius	6.10±0.12 R_{☉}
Luminosity	8,700 L_{☉}
Surface gravity (log g)	3.95±0.04 cgs
Temperature	25,700 K
Rotational velocity (v sin i)	330 km/s
Age	5.6±1.0 Myr

Other designations
- η Cen, CD−41°8917, CPD−41°6839, FK5 537, HD 127972, HIP 71352, HR 5440, SAO 225044

Database references
SIMBAD	data

Eta Centauri is a star in the southern constellation of Centaurus. Its name is a Bayer designation that is Latinized from η Centauri, and abbreviated Eta Cen or η Cen. This star has an apparent visual magnitude of +2.35, which indicates it is readily visible to the naked eye. Based on parallax measurements, it is located at a distance of around 306 light-years (94 parsecs).

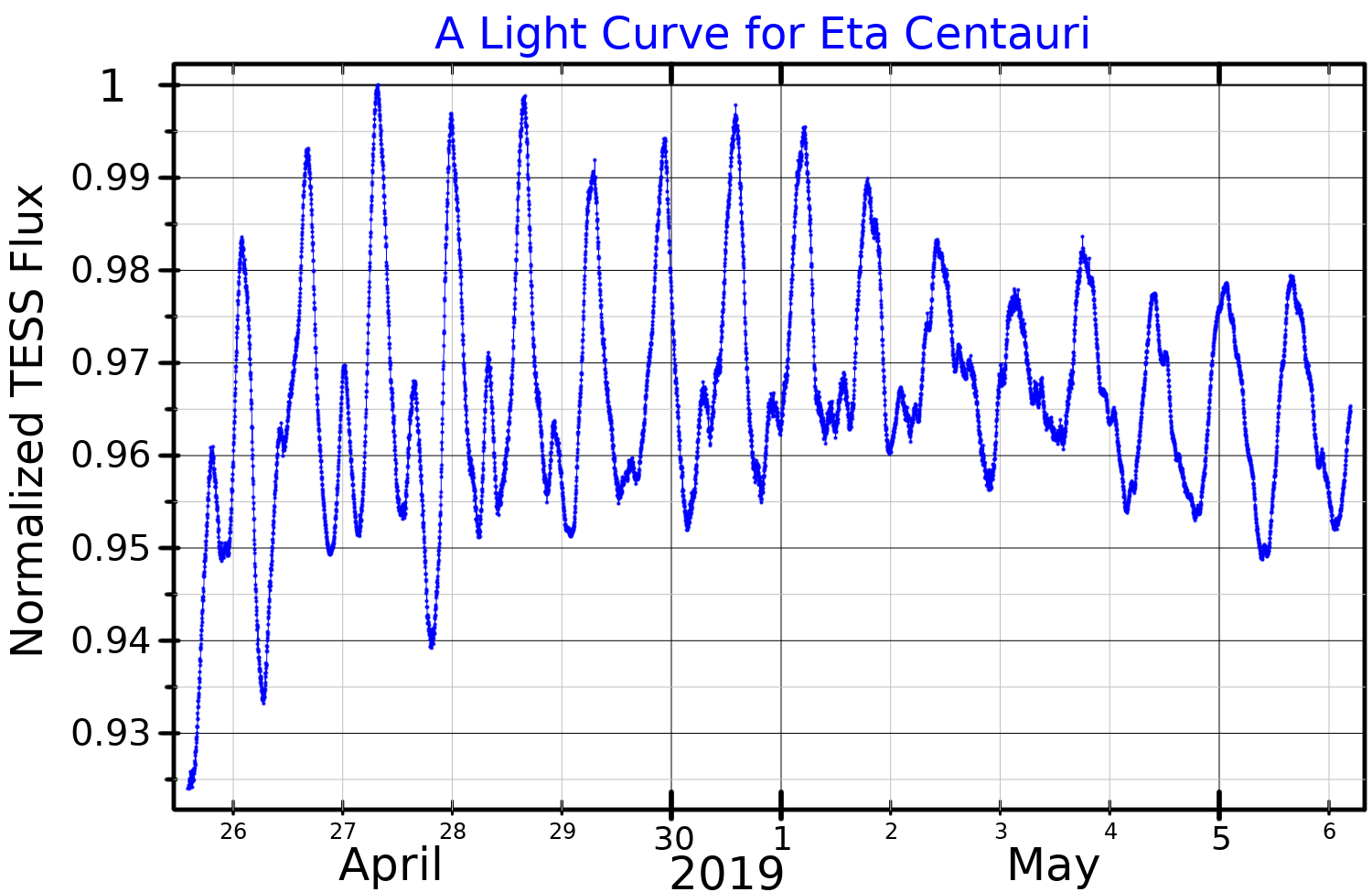
A light curve for Eta Centauri, plotted from TESS data

The stellar classification of this star is B1.5 Vne, indicating that it is a B-type main sequence star. The 'n' suffix means that the absorption lines are broadened from rapid rotation and the 'e' that it shows emission lines in its spectrum. It has a projected rotational velocity of 330 km s^{−1} and completes a full rotation in less than a day.

As a Be star, it has variable emissions in its hydrogen spectral lines. This emission can be modelled by a decretion disk of gas that has been ejected from the star by its rapid rotation and now follows a near-Keplerian orbit around the central body. Its brightness is also slightly variable, and it is classified as a Gamma Cassiopeiae variable star with multiple periods of variability. The International Variable Star Index lists Eta Centauri as both a Gamma Cassiopeiae variable and a Lambda Eridani variable with variations caused by its rotation and pulsations.

Eta Centauri has about 12 times the mass of the Sun, placing it above the dividing line between stars that evolve into white dwarfs and those that turn into supernovae. It is radiating 8,700 times the luminosity of the Sun from its outer atmosphere at an effective temperature of 25,700 K. At this temperature, the star glows with the blue-white hue common to B-type stars. Eta Centauri is a proper motion member of the Upper Centaurus–Lupus sub-group in the Scorpius–Centaurus OB association, the nearest such co-moving association of massive stars to the Sun.

In traditional Chinese astronomy, Eta Centauri was known as 庫樓二 (meaning: the Second (Star) of Koo Low).
