= 2 Centauri =

Star in the constellation Centaurus

- Location of 2 Centauri (circled in red)

Observation data Epoch J2000.0 Equinox ICRS
- Constellation: Centaurus
- Right ascension: 13^{h} 49^{m} 26.72175^{s}
- Declination: −34° 27′ 02.7929″
- Apparent magnitude (V): 4.16–4.26

Characteristics
- Evolutionary stage: AGB
- Spectral type: M5 III
- U−B color index: +1.44
- B−V color index: +1.49
- Variable type: SRb

Astrometry
Radial velocity (R_{v})	+40.7±0.7 km/s
Proper motion (μ)	RA: −41.68±0.23 mas/yr Dec.: −59.77±0.18 mas/yr
Parallax (π)	17.82±0.21 mas
Distance	183 ± 2 ly (56.1 ± 0.7 pc)
Absolute magnitude (M_{V})	+0.51

Details
Mass	1.0 M_{☉}
Radius	82.4 R_{☉}
Luminosity	767 L_{☉}
Surface gravity (log g)	0.65 cgs
Temperature	3,438 K

Other designations
- g Centauri, 2 Cen, V806 Cen, CD−33°9358, GC 18666, HD 120323, HIP 67457, HR 5192, SAO 204875

Database references
SIMBAD	data

2 Centauri is a single star in the southern constellation of Centaurus, located approximately 183 light-years from Earth. It has the Bayer designation g Centauri; 2 Centauri is the Flamsteed designation. This object is visible to the naked eye as faint, red-hued star with an apparent visual magnitude of about 4.2. It is moving away from the Earth with a heliocentric radial velocity of +41 km/s. The star is a member of the HR 1614 supercluster.

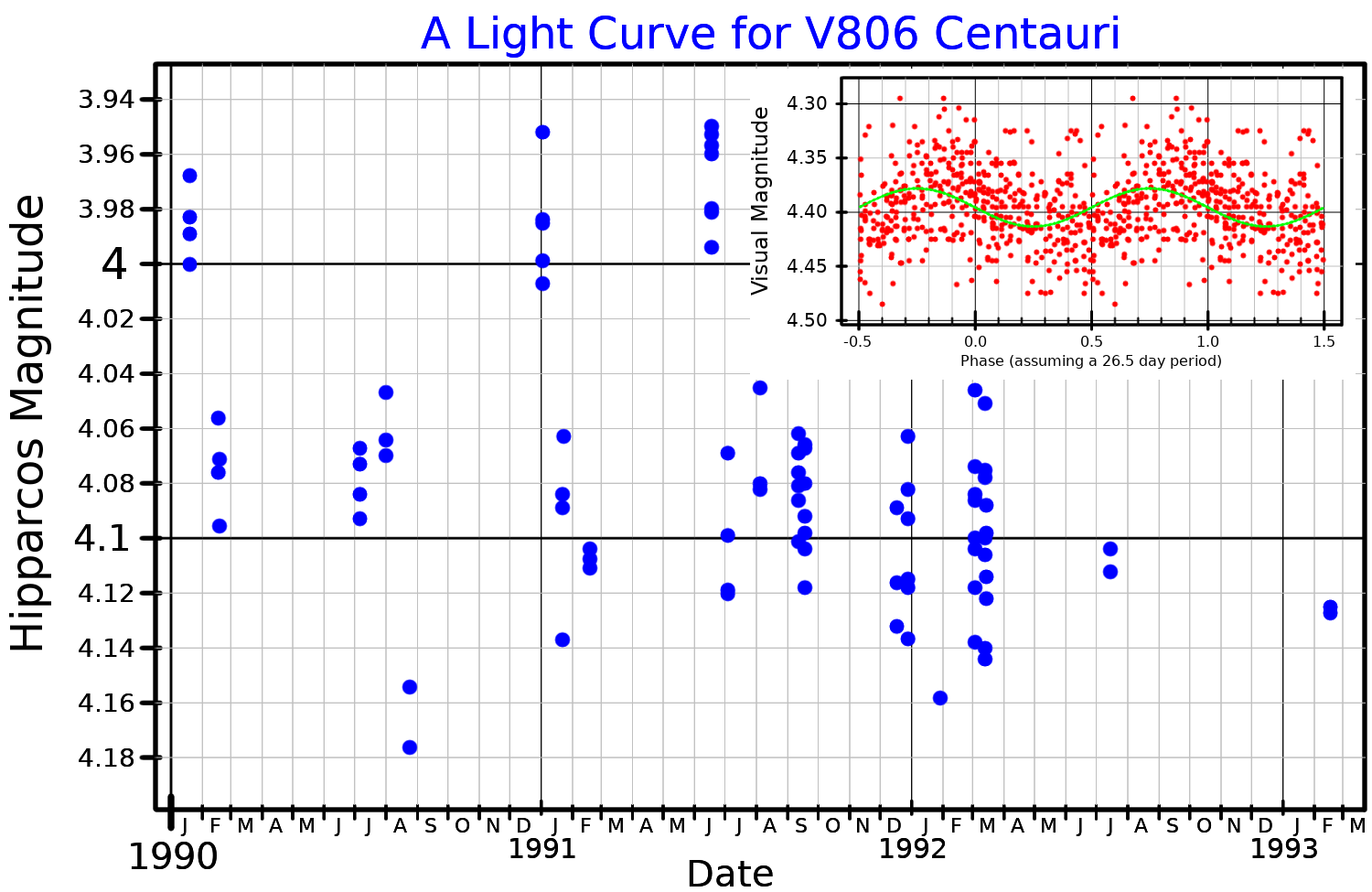
A light curve for V806 Centauri. The main plot shows the long term variability from Hipparcos data, and the inset plot shows the variability over the 26.5 day period, using data from Tabur et al. (2009). The green curve shows the best-fit sine wave, which has an amplitude of 18 millimagnitudes.

This is an evolved red giant star with a stellar classification of M5 III. In 1951, Alan William James Cousins announced that the star, then called g Centauri, is a variable star. It was given its variable star designation, V806 Centauri, in 1978. It is classified as a semiregular variable star and its brightness varies from magnitude +4.16 to +4.26 with a period of 12.57 days. The star has around 82 times the Sun's radius and is radiating 767 times the Sun's luminosity from its enlarged photosphere at an effective temperature of 3,438 K.
