= 3 Centauri =

Triple star system in the constellation Centaurus

- Location of 3 Centauri (circled in red)

Observation data Epoch J2000.0 Equinox ICRS
- Constellation: Centaurus
- Right ascension: 13^{h} 51^{m} 49.60^{s}
- Declination: −32° 59′ 38.7″
- Apparent magnitude (V): 4.32 (4.52 + 5.97)

Characteristics
- Spectral type: B5 III-IVp + B8 V
- B−V color index: −0.146±0.003
- Variable type: Eclipsing?

Astrometry
Radial velocity (R_{v})	+7.5±1.6 km/s
Absolute magnitude (M_{V})	−0.46

A
Proper motion (μ)	RA: −34.698±0.864 mas/yr Dec.: −27.909±0.792 mas/yr
Parallax (π)	11.0982±0.4267 mas
Distance	290 ± 10 ly (90 ± 3 pc)

B
Proper motion (μ)	RA: −36.737±0.266 mas/yr Dec.: −23.774±0.189 mas/yr
Parallax (π)	10.2659±0.1380 mas
Distance	318 ± 4 ly (97 ± 1 pc)

Orbit
Primary	Ba
Secondary	Bb
Period (P)	17.428 d
Eccentricity (e)	0.21
Periastron epoch (T)	2443296.44 JD
Argument of periastron (ω) (secondary)	15°
Semi-amplitude (K_{1}) (primary)	17 km/s

Details

3 Cen A
Mass	5.0±0.1 M_{☉}
Surface gravity (log g)	3.80 cgs
Temperature	17,500 K
Age	47.4±7.3 Myr

3 Cen B
Mass	2.47±0.10 M_{☉}
Radius	2.8 R_{☉}
Luminosity	50.2+11.7 −9.5 L_{☉}
Temperature	9,638+67 −66 K
Rotational velocity (v sin i)	135 km/s

Other designations
- k Centauri, 3 Cen, V983 Centauri, HIP 67669, WDS J13518-3300
- 3 Cen A: GC 18724, HD 120709, HR 5210, SAO 204916
- 3 Cen B: GC 18725, HD 120710, HR 5211, SAO 204917

Database references
SIMBAD	data
- A
- B

3 Centauri is a triple star system in the southern constellation of Centaurus, located approximately 300 light years from the Sun. It is visible to the naked eye as a faint, blue-white hued star with a combined apparent visual magnitude of 4.32. As of 2017, the two visible components had an angular separation of 7.851″ along a position angle of 106°. The system has the Bayer designation k Centauri; 3 Centauri is the Flamsteed designation. It was a suspected eclipsing binary with a variable star designation V983 Centauri, however the AAVSO website lists it as non-variable, formerly suspected to be variable.

The brighter member, designated component A, is a magnitude 4.52 chemically peculiar star of the helium-weak (CP4) variety, and has a stellar classification of B5 III-IVp. The spectrum of the star displays overabundances of elements such as nitrogen, phosphorus, manganese, iron, and nickel, while carbon, oxygen, magnesium, aluminium, sulfur, and chlorine appear underabundant relative to the Sun. Weak emission line features are also visible.

The magnitude 5.97 secondary, component B, is a single-lined spectroscopic binary star system with an orbital period of 17.4 days and an eccentricity of 0.21. The pair have an angular separation of 2.485 mas. The visible component is a B-type main-sequence star with a class of B8 V.
