= HD 117440 =

Star in the constellation Centaurus

d Centauri
- Location of d Centauri (circled in red)

Observation data Epoch J2000.0 Equinox ICRS
- Constellation: Centaurus
- Right ascension: 13^{h} 31^{m} 02.66^{s}
- Declination: −39° 24′ 26.3″
- Apparent magnitude (V): 4.64 + 5.03

Characteristics
- Spectral type: G7III + G9III
- U−B color index: +1.03
- B−V color index: +1.17
- Variable type: Suspected

Astrometry
Radial velocity (R_{v})	−2.40±0.74 km/s
Proper motion (μ)	RA: −15.67±0.47 mas/yr Dec.: −10.49±0.31 mas/yr
Parallax (π)	3.60±0.49 mas
Distance	approx. 900 ly (approx. 280 pc)

Orbit
Period (P)	83.14±1.26 yr
Semi-major axis (a)	0.161±0.004″
Eccentricity (e)	0.521±0.013
Inclination (i)	145.2±4.0°
Longitude of the node (Ω)	146.5±8.6°
Periastron epoch (T)	1956.12±1.91 B
Argument of periastron (ω) (secondary)	244.4±3.6°

Details
Mass	7.5±0.5 M_{☉}
Surface gravity (log g)	1.86 cgs
Temperature	4,683 K
Metallicity [Fe/H]	−0.36 dex
Rotational velocity (v sin i)	4.5 km/s
Age	40.3±7.6 Myr

Other designations
- d Cen, NSV 6283, CD−38°8592, GC 18254, HD 117440, HIP 65936, HR 5089, SAO 204545, CCDM J13310-3924, WDS J13310-3924

Database references
SIMBAD	data

HD 117440, also known by its Bayer designation d Centauri, is a binary star system in the southern constellation of Centaurus. It is visible to the naked eye with a combined apparent visual magnitude of 3.90. The distance to this system is approximately 900 light years based on parallax measurements. It is drifting closer to the Sun with a radial velocity of −2 km/s.

A companion star was first reported by T. J. J. See in 1897 at an angular separation of 0.2″ from the primary. Orbital elements for the pair were published by W. S. Finsen in 1962 then updated in 1964, yielding an orbital period of 83.1 years with a semimajor axis of 0.161″ and an eccentricity of 0.52. Both components are evolved G-type giant stars with a yellow, Sun-like hue. The primary, component A, has an apparent magnitude of +4.64, while the secondary, component B, has an apparent magnitude of +5.03.
