= D Centauri =

Multiple star in the constellation Centaurus

Observation data Epoch J2000.0 Equinox ICRS
- Constellation: Centaurus
- Right ascension: 12^{h} 14^{m} 02.697^{s}
- Declination: −45° 43′ 26.10″
- Apparent magnitude (V): +5.31 (5.78 + 6.98)

Characteristics
- Spectral type: K3III (K4IIIab + K2IIIb)
- U−B color index: +1.82/1.19
- B−V color index: +1.400±0.003/1.21

Astrometry

A
Radial velocity (R_{v})	+10.27±0.68 km/s
Proper motion (μ)	RA: −37.186 mas/yr Dec.: 6.606 mas/yr
Parallax (π)	5.3350±0.1399 mas
Distance	610 ± 20 ly (187 ± 5 pc)
Absolute magnitude (M_{V})	−0.88

B
Proper motion (μ)	RA: −33.604 mas/yr Dec.: 5.434 mas/yr
Parallax (π)	4.9297±0.0550 mas
Distance	662 ± 7 ly (203 ± 2 pc)

Details

A
Radius	42.8+1.1 −2.13 R_{☉}
Luminosity	434±13 L_{☉}
Temperature	4,026+104 −50 K

B
Radius	13.5+1.7 −1.9 R_{☉}
Luminosity	90.5±1.4 L_{☉}
Temperature	4,853+275 −392 K

Other designations
- D Cen, CD−45°7630, GC 16703, HD 106321, HIP 59654, HR 4652, SAO 223297, CCDM J12140-4543

Database references
SIMBAD	data

D Centauri is a double star in the southern constellation of Centaurus. The system is faintly visible to the naked eye as a point of light with a combined apparent magnitude of +5.31; the two components are of magnitude 5.78 and 6.98, respectively. It is located at a distance of approximately 610 light years from the Sun based on parallax, and is drifting further away with a radial velocity of ~10 km/s.

The dual nature of this star was announced by C. Rumker in 1837. As of 2015, the pair had an angular separation of 2.70″ along a position angle of 242°. This orange-hued double has a combined stellar classification of K3III, matching an aging giant star that has exhausted the supply of hydrogen at its core. In 1984, C. J. Corbally found a class of K4IIIab for the primary and K2IIIb for the fainter secondary.
