= Sigma Centauri =

Star in the constellation Centaurus

σ Centauri
- Location of σ Centauri (circled in red)

Observation data Epoch J2000.0 Equinox J2000.0 (ICRS)
- Constellation: Centaurus
- Right ascension: 12^{h} 28^{m} 02.38208^{s}
- Declination: −50° 13′ 50.2872″
- Apparent magnitude (V): 3.91

Characteristics
- Evolutionary stage: Main sequence
- Spectral type: B3 V
- U−B color index: −0.805
- B−V color index: −0.202

Astrometry
Radial velocity (R_{v})	+12.8±1.4 km/s
Proper motion (μ)	RA: −32.36 mas/yr Dec.: −12.51 mas/yr
Parallax (π)	7.92±0.18 mas
Distance	412 ± 9 ly (126 ± 3 pc)
Absolute magnitude (M_{V})	−1.60

Details
Mass	6.8±0.1 M_{☉}
Radius	4.5 R_{☉}
Luminosity	1,101 L_{☉}
Temperature	15,744 K
Rotational velocity (v sin i)	169 km/s
Age	25.3±6.3 Myr

Other designations
- σ Cen, CD−49°7115, FK5 464, HD 108483, HIP 60823, HR 4743, SAO 223454

Database references
SIMBAD	data

Sigma Centauri is a solitary star in the southern constellation of Centaurus. Its name is a Bayer designation that is Latinized from σ Centauri, and abbreviated Sigma Cen or σ Cen. This star is visible to the naked eye with an apparent visual magnitude of 3.91. A visual companion at an angular separation of 88.11±0.37 mas along a position angle of 14.33°±2.59° was detected in 2010 using interferometry, but its association with Sigma Centauri remains undetermined as of 2013. The distance to Sigma Centauri, based upon an annual parallax shift of 7.92 mas, is around 412 light years.

This is a B-type main sequence star with a stellar classification of B3 V. It is a helium-rich star, the most massive type of chemically peculiar star. Sigma Centauri has around 6.8 times the mass of the Sun and 4.5 times the Sun's radius. It has a relatively high rate of spin with a projected rotational velocity of 169 km/s, and is around 25 million years old. The star radiates 1,101 times the solar luminosity from its outer atmosphere at an effective temperature of 15,744 K. It is a member of the Lower Centaurus Crux component of the Scorpius–Centaurus association.
