= Centaurus =

Constellation in the southern celestial hemisphere

- Constellation
- List of stars in Centaurus
- Abbreviation: Cen
- Genitive: Centauri
- Pronunciation: /sɛnˈtɔːrəs, -ˈtɑːr-/ sen-TOR-əss, -TAR-, genitive /sɛnˈtɔːraɪ, -ˈtɔːri, -ˈtɑːri/ sen-TOR-eye, -TOR-ee, -TAR-ee
- Symbolism: the Centaur
- Right ascension: 11^{h} 05^{m} 20.9415^{s}–15^{h} 03^{m} 11.1071^{s}
- Declination: −29.9948788°–−64.6957885°
- Area: 1060 sq. deg. (9th)
- Main stars: 11
- Bayer/Flamsteed stars: 69
- Stars with planets: 15
- Stars brighter than 3.00^{m}: 10
- Stars within 10.00 pc (32.62 ly): 8
- Brightest star: α Cen (−0.27^{m})
- Nearest star: Proxima Centauri (α Cen C)
- Messier objects: 0
- Meteor showers: Alpha Centaurids; Omicron Centaurids; Theta Centaurids
- Bordering constellations: Antlia; Carina; Circinus; Crux; Hydra; Libra (corner); Lupus; Musca; Vela
- Visible at latitudes between +25° and −90°. Best visible at 21:00 (9 p.m.) during the month of May.

Centaurus (/sɛnˈtɔːrəs, -ˈtɑːr-/ sen-TOR-əss, -TAR-) is a bright constellation in the southern sky. One of the largest constellations, Centaurus was included among the 48 constellations listed by the 2nd-century astronomer Ptolemy, and it remains one of the 88 modern constellations. In Greek mythology, Centaurus represents a centaur; a creature that is half human, half horse (another constellation named after a centaur is one from the zodiac: Sagittarius). Notable stars include Alpha Centauri, the nearest star system to the Solar System, its neighbour in the sky Beta Centauri, and HR 5171, one of the largest stars yet discovered. The constellation also contains Omega Centauri, the brightest globular cluster as visible from Earth and the largest identified in the Milky Way, possibly a remnant of a dwarf galaxy.

== Features ==
Centaurus is a large constellation with many bright stars, two stars brighter than magnitude 1, and a number of the best-known deep-sky objects, although the Milky Way does not lie within its borders.

=== Stars ===
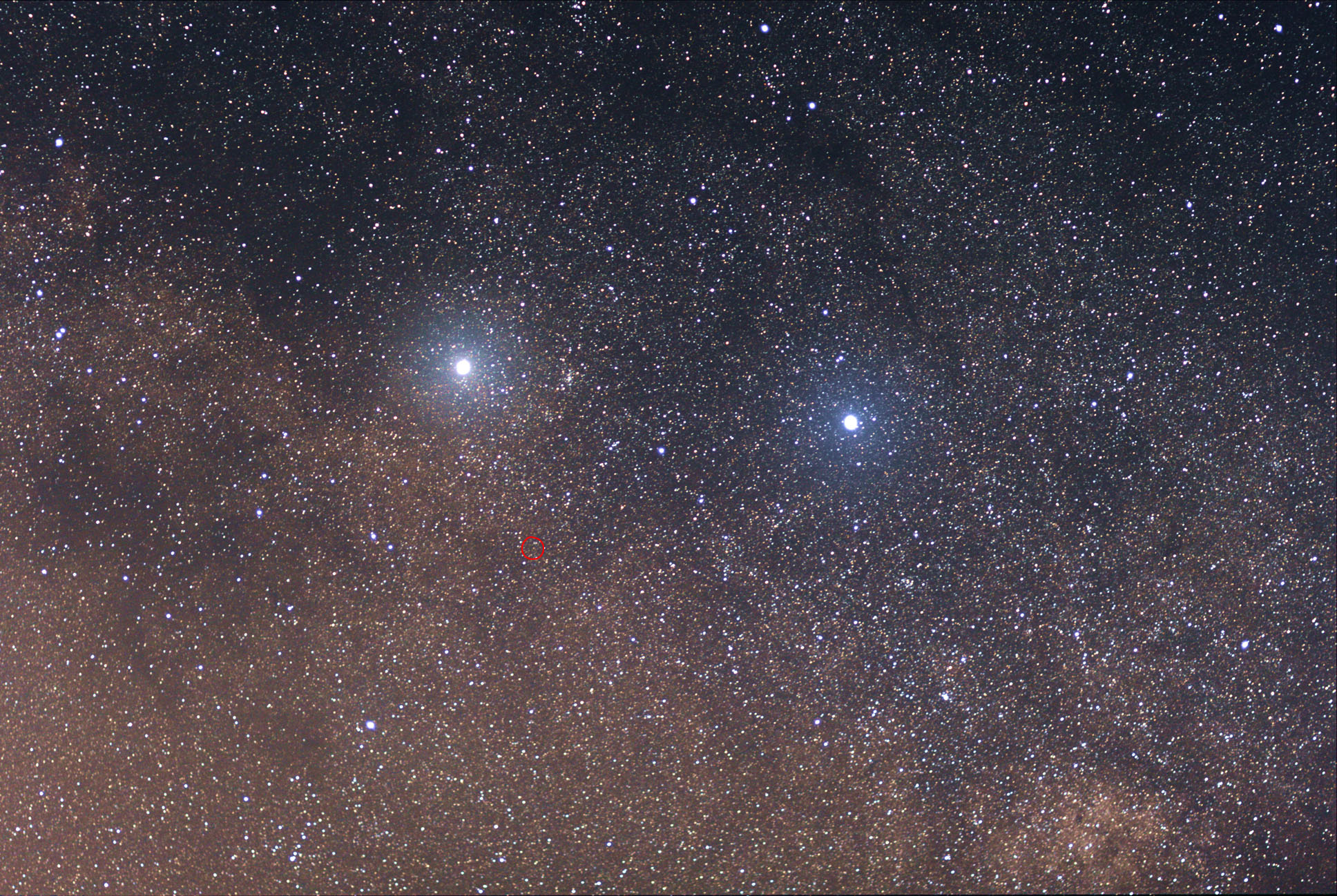
The two bright stars are (left) Alpha Centauri and (right) Beta Centauri. The faint red star in the center of the red circle is Proxima Centauri.

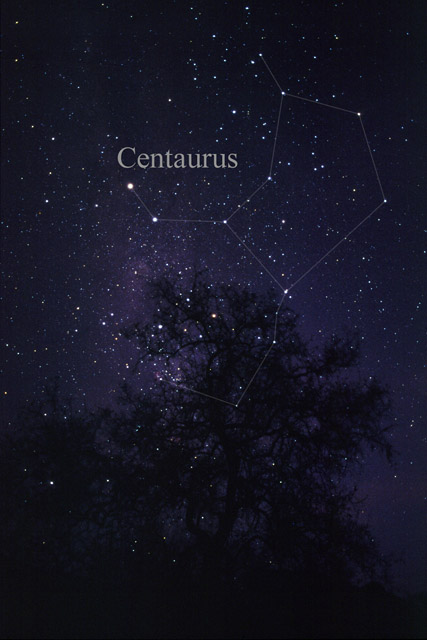
Centaurus in the southwestern sky, shortly after sunset. South is to the left.

Centaurus in the Firmamentum Sobiescianum of Johannes Hevelius. N.B. This image is reversed from what one sees looking at the sky — it is as though one is looking at the "celestial sphere" from the outside.

Centaurus contains several very bright stars. Its alpha and beta stars are used as "southern pointer stars" to help observers find the constellation Crux. Centaurus has 281 stars above magnitude 6.5, meaning that they are visible to the unaided eye, the most of any constellation. Alpha Centauri, the closest star system to the Sun, has a high proper motion; it will be a mere half-degree from Beta Centauri in approximately 4000 years.

Alpha Centauri is a triple star system composed of a binary system orbited by Proxima Centauri, currently the nearest star to the Sun. Traditionally called Rigil Kentaurus (from Arabic رجل قنطورس, meaning "foot of the centaur") or Toliman (from Arabic الظليمين meaning "two male ostriches"), the system has an overall magnitude of −0.28 and is 4.4 light-years from Earth. The primary and secondary are both yellow-hued stars; the first is of magnitude −0.01 and the second: 1.35. Proxima, the tertiary star, is a red dwarf of magnitude 11.0; it appears almost 2 degrees away from the close pairing of Alpha and has a period of approximately one million years. Also a flare star, Proxima has minutes-long outbursts where it brightens by over a magnitude. The Alpha couple revolve in 80-year periodicity and will next appear closest as seen from Earth's telescopes in 2037 and 2038, together as they appear to the naked eye they present the third-brightest "star" in the night sky.

One other first magnitude star Beta Centauri is in the constellation in a position beyond Proxima and toward the narrow axis of Crux, thus with Alpha forming a far-south limb of the constellation. Also called Hadar and Agena, it is a double star; the primary is a blue-hued giant star of magnitude 0.6, 525 light-years from Earth. The secondary is of magnitude 4.0 and has a modest separation, appearing only under intense magnification due to its distance.

The northerly star Theta Centauri, officially named Menkent, is an orange giant star of magnitude 2.06. It is the only bright star of Centaurus that is easily visible from mid-northern latitudes.

The next bright object is Gamma Centauri, a binary star which appears to the naked eye at magnitude 2.2. The primary and secondary are both blue-white hued stars of magnitude 2.9; their period is 84 years.

Centaurus also has many dimmer double stars and binary stars. 3 Centauri is a double star with a blue-white hued primary of magnitude 4.5 and a secondary of magnitude 6.0. The primary is 344 light-years away.

Centaurus is home to many variable stars. R Centauri is a Mira variable star with a minimum magnitude of 11.8 and a maximum magnitude of 5.3; it is about 1,250 light-years from Earth and has a period of 18 months. V810 Centauri is a semiregular variable.

BPM 37093 is a white dwarf star whose carbon atoms are thought to have formed a crystalline structure. Since diamond also consists of carbon arranged in a crystalline lattice (though of a different configuration), scientists have nicknamed this star "Lucy" after the Beatles song "Lucy in the Sky with Diamonds."

PDS 70, (V1032 Centauri) a low mass T Tauri star is found in the constellation Centaurus. In July 2018 astronomers captured the first conclusive image of a protoplanetary disk containing a nascent exoplanet, named PDS 70b.

=== Deep-sky objects ===
ω Centauri (NGC 5139), despite being listed as the constellation's "omega" star, is in fact a naked-eye globular cluster, 17,000 light-years away with a diameter of 150 light-years. It is the largest and brightest globular cluster in the Milky Way; at ten times the size of the next-largest cluster, it has a magnitude of 3.7. It is also the most luminous globular cluster in the Milky Way, at over one million solar luminosities. Omega Centauri is classified as a Shapley class VIII cluster, which means that its center is loosely concentrated. It is also one of only two globular clusters to be given a stellar designation; in its case a Bayer letter. The other is 47 Tucanae (Xi Tucanae), which has a Flamsteed number. Omega Centauri contains several million stars, most of which are yellow dwarf stars, but also possesses red giants and blue-white stars; the stars have an average age of 12 billion years. This has prompted suspicion that Omega Centauri was the core of a dwarf galaxy that had been absorbed by the Milky Way. Omega Centauri was determined to be nonstellar in 1677 by the English astronomer Edmond Halley, though it was visible as a star to the ancients. Its status as a globular cluster was determined by James Dunlop in 1827. To the unaided eye, Omega Centauri appears fuzzy and is obviously non-circular; it is approximately half a degree in diameter, the same size as the full Moon.

Centaurus is also home to open clusters. NGC 3766 is an open cluster 6,300 light-years from Earth that is visible to the unaided eye. It contains approximately 100 stars, the brightest of which are 7th magnitude. NGC 5460 is another naked-eye open cluster, 2,300 light-years from Earth, that has an overall magnitude of 6 and contains approximately 40 stars.

There is one bright planetary nebula in Centaurus, NGC 3918, also known as the Blue Planetary. It has an overall magnitude of 8.0 and a central star of magnitude 11.0; it is 2600 light-years from Earth. The Blue Planetary was discovered by John Herschel and named for its color's similarity to Uranus, though the nebula is apparently three times larger than the planet.

Centaurus is rich in galaxies as well. NGC 4622 is a face-on spiral galaxy located 200 million light-years from Earth (redshift 0.0146). Its spiral arms wind in both directions, which makes it nearly impossible for astronomers to determine the rotation of the galaxy. Astronomers theorize that a collision with a smaller companion galaxy near the core of the main galaxy could have led to the unusual spiral structure. NGC 5253, a peculiar irregular galaxy, is located near the border with Hydra and M83, with which it likely had a close gravitational interaction 1–2 billion years ago. This may have sparked the galaxy's high rate of star formation, which continues today and contributes to its high surface brightness. NGC 5253 includes a large nebula and at least 12 large star clusters. In the eyepiece, it is a small galaxy of magnitude 10 with dimensions of 5 arcminutes by 2 arcminutes and a bright nucleus. NGC 4945 is a spiral galaxy seen edge-on from Earth, 13 million light-years away. It is visible with any amateur telescope, as well as binoculars under good conditions; it has been described as "shaped like a candle flame", being long and thin (16' by 3'). In the eyepiece of a large telescope, its southeastern dust lane becomes visible. Another galaxy is NGC 5102, found by star-hopping from Iota Centauri (proper name is Kulou since 17 February 2025). In the eyepiece, it appears as an elliptical object 9 arcminutes by 2.5 arcminutes tilted on a southwest–northeast axis.

One of the closest active galaxies to Earth is the Centaurus A galaxy, NGC 5128, at 11 million light-years away (redshift 0.00183). It has a supermassive black hole at its core, which expels massive jets of matter that emit radio waves due to synchrotron radiation. Astronomers posit that its dust lanes, not common in elliptical galaxies, are due to a previous merger with another galaxy, probably a spiral galaxy. NGC 5128 appears in the optical spectrum as a fairly large elliptical galaxy with a prominent dust lane. Its overall magnitude is 7.0 and it has been seen under perfect conditions with the naked eye, making it one of the most distant objects visible to the unaided observer. In equatorial and southern latitudes, it is easily found by star hopping from Omega Centauri. In small telescopes, the dust lane is not visible; it begins to appear with about 4 inches of aperture under good conditions. In large amateur instruments, above about 12 inches in aperture, the dust lane's west-northwest to east-southeast direction is easily discerned. Another dim dust lane on the east side of the 12-arcminute-by-15-arcminute galaxy is also visible. ESO 270-17, also called the Fourcade-Figueroa Object, is a low-surface brightness object believed to be the remnants of a galaxy; it does not have a core and is very difficult to observe with an amateur telescope. It measures 7 arcminutes by 1 arcminute. It likely originated as a spiral galaxy and underwent a catastrophic gravitational interaction with Centaurus A around 500 million years ago, stopping its rotation and destroying its structure.

NGC 4650A is a polar-ring galaxy 136 million light-years from Earth (redshift 0.01). It has a central core made of older stars that resembles an elliptical galaxy, and an outer ring of young stars that orbits around the core. The plane of the outer ring is distorted, which suggests that NGC 4650A is the result of a galaxy collision about a billion years ago. This galaxy has also been cited in studies of dark matter, because the stars in the outer ring orbit too quickly for their collective mass. This suggests that the galaxy is surrounded by a dark matter halo, which provides the necessary mass.

One of the closest galaxy clusters to Earth is the Centaurus Cluster at c. 160 million light-years away, having redshift 0.0114. It has a cooler, denser central region of gas and a hotter, more diffuse outer region. The intracluster medium in the Centaurus Cluster has a high concentration of metals (elements heavier than helium) due to a large number of supernovae. This cluster also possesses a plume of gas whose origin is unknown.

== History ==
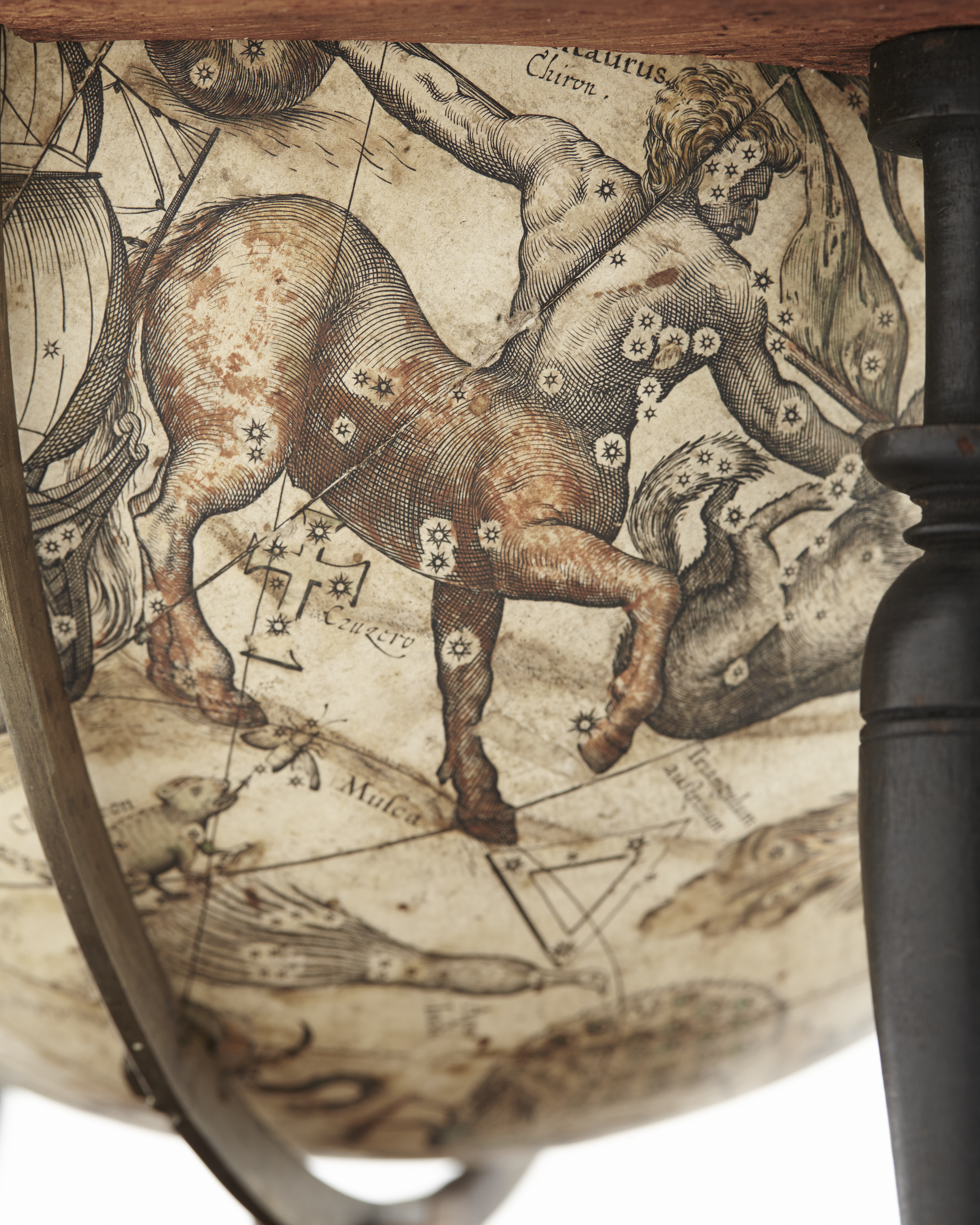
Centaurus, 1602

While Centaurus now has a high southern latitude, at the dawn of civilization it was an equatorial constellation. Precession has been slowly shifting it southward for millennia, and it is now close to its maximal southern declination. In a little over 7000 years it will be at maximum visibility for those in the northern hemisphere, visible at times in the year up to quite a high northern latitude. The figure of Centaurus can be traced back to a Babylonian constellation known as the Bison-man (MUL.GUD.ALIM). This being was depicted in two major forms: firstly, as a 4-legged bison with a human head, and secondly, as a being with a man's head and torso attached to the rear legs and tail of a bull or bison. It has been closely associated with the Sun god Utu-Shamash from very early times. By the late 3rd millennium the Bison-man had been replaced by a new constellation, the Wild Boar.

The Greeks depicted the constellation as a centaur and gave it its current name. It was mentioned by Eudoxus in the 4th century BC and Aratus in the 3rd century BC. In the 2nd century AD, Claudius Ptolemy catalogued 37 stars in Centaurus, including Alpha Centauri. Large as it is now, in earlier times it was even larger, as the constellation Lupus was treated as an asterism within Centaurus, portrayed in illustrations as an unspecified animal either in the centaur's grasp or impaled on its spear. The Southern Cross, which is now regarded as a separate constellation, was treated by the ancients as a mere asterism formed of the stars composing the centaur's legs. Additionally, what is now the minor constellation Circinus was treated as undefined stars under the centaur's front hooves.

According to the Roman poet Ovid (Fasti v.379), the constellation honors the centaur Chiron, who was tutor to many of the earlier Greek heroes including Heracles (Hercules), Theseus, and Jason, the leader of the Argonauts. It is not to be confused with the more warlike centaur represented by the zodiacal constellation Sagittarius. The legend associated with Chiron says that he was accidentally poisoned with an arrow shot by Hercules, and was subsequently placed in the heavens.

== Equivalents ==
In Chinese astronomy, the stars of Centaurus are found in three areas: the Azure Dragon of the East (東方青龍, Dōng Fāng Qīng Lóng), the Vermillion Bird of the South (南方朱雀, Nán Fāng Zhū Què), and the Southern Asterisms (近南極星區, Jìnnánjíxīngōu). Not all of the stars of Centaurus can be seen from China, and the unseen stars were classified among the Southern Asterisms by Xu Guangqi, based on his study of western star charts. However, most of the brightest stars of Centaurus, including α Centauri, θ Centauri (or Menkent), ε Centauri and η Centauri, can be seen in the Chinese sky.

Some Polynesian peoples considered the stars of Centaurus to be a constellation as well. On Pukapuka, Centaurus had two names: Na Mata-o-te-tokolua and Na Lua-mata-o-Wua-ma-Velo. In Tonga, the constellation was called by four names: O-nga-tangata, Tautanga-ufi, Mamangi-Halahu, and Mau-kuo-mau. Alpha and Beta Centauri were not named specifically by the people of Pukapuka or Tonga, but they were named by the people of Hawaii and the Tuamotus. In Hawaii, the name for Alpha Centauri was either Melemele or Ka Maile-hope and the name for Beta Centauri was either Polapola or Ka Maile-mua. In the Tuamotu islands, Alpha was called Na Kuhi and Beta was called Tere.

The Pointer (α Centauri and β Centauri) is one of the asterisms used by Bugis sailors for navigation, called bintoéng balué, meaning "the widowed-before-marriage". It is also called bintoéng sallatang meaning "southern star".

== Namesakes ==
Two United States Navy ships, USS Centaurus (AKA-17) and USS Centaurus (AK-264), were named after Centaurus, the constellation.

== See also ==
- Centaurus (Chinese astronomy)
- List of brightest stars
