= List of stars in Monoceros =

This is the list of notable stars in the constellation Monoceros, sorted by decreasing brightness.

Name	B	F	Var	HD	HIP	RA	Dec	vis. mag.	abs. mag.	Dist. (ly)	Sp. class	Notes
α Mon	α	26		61935	37447	07^{h} 41^{m} 14.88^{s}	−09° 33′ 03.9″	3.94	0.71	144	K0III	
γ Mon	γ	5		43232	29651	06^{h} 14^{m} 51.34^{s}	−06° 16′ 29.0″	3.99	−2.49	644	K3III	
δ Mon	δ	22		55185	34769	07^{h} 11^{m} 51.86^{s}	−00° 29′ 34.0″	4.15	−1.15	375	A2V	
ζ Mon	ζ	29		67594	39863	08^{h} 08^{m} 35.66^{s}	−02° 59′ 01.6″	4.36	−4.41	1852	G2Ib	
ε Mon A	ε	8		44769	30419	06^{h} 23^{m} 46.10^{s}	+04° 35′ 34.2″	4.39	1.41	128	A5IV	component of the ε Mon system
13 Mon		13		46300	31216	06^{h} 32^{m} 54.23^{s}	+07° 19′ 58.7″	4.47	−3.86	1509	A0Ib	suspected variable
18 Mon		18		49293	32578	06^{h} 47^{m} 51.66^{s}	+02° 24′ 43.9″	4.48	−0.81	373	K0III	
β Mon A	β	11		45725	30867	06^{h} 28^{m} 49.07^{s}	−07° 01′ 59.0″	4.60	−2.03	691	B3Ve	Herschel's Wonder Star; component of the β Mon system; Be star
S Mon		15	S	47839	31978	06^{h} 40^{m} 58.66^{s}	+09° 53′ 44.7″	4.66	−2.82	1022	O7V + O9.5V	in NGC 2264; irregular variable, V_{max} = 4.62^{m}, V_{min} = 4.68^{m}
28 Mon		28	V645	65953	39211	08^{h} 01^{m} 13.30^{s}	−01° 23′ 32.7″	4.68	−1.12	472	K4III	FK Com variable, ΔV = 0.02^{m}, P = 0.21 d
17 Mon		17		49161	32533	06^{h} 47^{m} 19.84^{s}	+08° 02′ 14.2″	4.77	−1.09	484	K4III	
20 Mon		20		54810	34622	07^{h} 10^{m} 13.68^{s}	−04° 14′ 15.5″	4.91	0.85	211	K0III	
3 Mon		3		40967	28574	06^{h} 01^{m} 50.43^{s}	−10° 35′ 52.6″	4.92	−2.47	979	B5III	suspected variable
27 Mon		27		65695	39079	07^{h} 59^{m} 44.18^{s}	−03° 40′ 46.5″	4.93	0.51	250	K2III	
19 Mon		19	V637	52918	33971	07^{h} 02^{m} 54.78^{s}	−04° 14′ 21.3″	4.99	−2.68	1116	B1V	β Cep variable, V_{max} = 4.96^{m}, V_{min} = 5.01^{m}, P = 0.19 d
2 Mon		2		40536	28325	05^{h} 59^{m} 04.31^{s}	−09° 33′ 29.3″	5.04	0.02	328	A6m	
HD 42690				42690	29417	06^{h} 11^{m} 51.82^{s}	−06° 33′ 01.0″	5.06	−2.78	1203	B2V	
10 Mon		10		45546	30772	06^{h} 27^{m} 57.57^{s}	−04° 45′ 43.7″	5.06	−3.03	1353	B2V	
HD 49331				49331	32558	06^{h} 47^{m} 37.22^{s}	−08° 59′ 54.6″	5.08	−2.94	1309	M1II	suspected variable, V_{max} = 5.00^{m}, V_{min} = 5.11^{m}
HD 46487				46487	31278	06^{h} 33^{m} 37.92^{s}	−01° 13′ 12.4″	5.09	−0.99	536	B5Vn	
25 Mon		25		61064	37088	07^{h} 37^{m} 16.73^{s}	−04° 06′ 39.7″	5.13	1.18	202	F6III	suspected δ Sct variable, ΔV = 0.01^{m}
HR 2142			V696	41335	28744	06^{h} 04^{m} 13.50^{s}	−06° 42′ 32.2″	5.19	−2.06	918	B2Vne+	unique variable
77 Ori		(77)		45416	30717	06^{h} 27^{m} 13.76^{s}	+00° 17′ 57.4″	5.19	−2.13	950	K1II	
HD 48217				48217	32064	06^{h} 41^{m} 56.37^{s}	−09° 10′ 02.7″	5.21	−0.11	378	M0III	
HD 52666				52666	33878	07^{h} 01^{m} 56.39^{s}	−05° 43′ 19.5″	5.21	−1.38	682	M2III	suspected variable, V_{max} = 5.15^{m}, V_{min} = 5.21^{m}
HD 46089				46089	31119	06^{h} 31^{m} 48.29^{s}	+11° 32′ 39.6″	5.22	1.16	211	A3V	
7 Mon		7		44112	30073	06^{h} 19^{m} 42.80^{s}	−07° 49′ 22.5″	5.27	−1.74	823	B2.5V	
HD 43993				43993	29996	06^{h} 18^{m} 50.58^{s}	−09° 23′ 23.9″	5.36	−0.62	511	K1III	
HD 41692				41692	28949	06^{h} 06^{m} 38.74^{s}	−04° 11′ 37.8″	5.37	−3.71	2131	B5IV	
β Mon B	β	11		45726		06^{h} 28^{m} 49.50^{s}	−07° 02′ 04.0″	5.40				Herschel's Wonder Star; component of the β Mon system
HD 46229				46229	31121	06^{h} 31^{m} 50.07^{s}	−08° 09′ 29.5″	5.43	−1.70	869	K2III	
21 Mon		21	V571	55057	34724	07^{h} 11^{m} 23.63^{s}	−00° 18′ 06.9″	5.44	0.92	261	F2V	δ Sct variable, V_{max} = 5.43^{m}, V_{min} = 5.5^{m}, P = 0.089 d
HD 50747				50747	33184	06^{h} 54^{m} 24.66^{s}	−01° 07′ 37.1″	5.45	−0.42	484	A4IV	γ Dor variable, ΔV = 0.001^{m}, P = 0.21 d
HD 62902				62902	37901	07^{h} 46^{m} 02.16^{s}	−06° 46′ 20.2″	5.49	1.17	238	K5III	
HD 47054				47054	31583	06^{h} 36^{m} 35.33^{s}	−05° 12′ 40.0″	5.52	−1.52	834	B8V	
78 Ori		(78)		45433	30720	06^{h} 27^{m} 15.59^{s}	−00° 16′ 33.6″	5.55	−1.26	749	K5III	
HD 45415				45415	30728	06^{h} 27^{m} 20.48^{s}	+02° 54′ 29.7″	5.55	0.79	292	G9III	
β Mon C	β			45727		06^{h} 28^{m} 49.50^{s}	−07° 02′ 04.0″	5.60				Herschel's Wonder Star; component of the β Mon system
HD 46304				46304	31167	06^{h} 32^{m} 23.13^{s}	−05° 52′ 07.4″	5.60	2.42	141	F0Vnn+...	
HD 59311				59311	36388	07^{h} 29^{m} 18.68^{s}	−01° 54′ 19.1″	5.60	−2.89	1630	K5III	
HD 63752				63752	38253	07^{h} 50^{m} 10.58^{s}	−09° 11′ 00.4″	5.60	−2.57	1405	K3III	
HD 53208				53208	34086	07^{h} 04^{m} 05.25^{s}	−05° 19′ 26.3″	5.63	−2.38	1304	K3III	suspected variable
HD 49147				49147	32474	06^{h} 46^{m} 39.02^{s}	−10° 06′ 26.5″	5.66	−0.42	535	B9.5V	
HD 49434				49434	32617	06^{h} 48^{m} 19.09^{s}	−01° 19′ 07.8″	5.75	2.74	131	F1V	δ Sct and γ Dor variable
HD 49643				49643	32698	06^{h} 49^{m} 16.41^{s}	−02° 16′ 19.3″	5.75	−0.42	558	B8IIIn	
HD 50277				50277	33024	06^{h} 52^{m} 49.49^{s}	+08° 22′ 49.6″	5.75	1.77	204	F0Vn	
HD 59381				59381	36396	07^{h} 29^{m} 22.11^{s}	−10° 19′ 36.0″	5.75	−1.52	926	K5III	slow irregular variable, V_{max} = 5.74^{m}, V_{min} = 5.76^{m}
HD 64235				64235	38474	07^{h} 52^{m} 47.87^{s}	−05° 25′ 41.5″	5.76	2.70	133	F5IVs	suspected variable, V_{max} = 5.74^{m}, V_{min} = 5.77^{m}
HD 46769				46769	31446	06^{h} 35^{m} 15.83^{s}	+00° 53′ 24.8″	5.78	−3.94	2860	B8Ib	
HD 49933				49933	32851	06^{h} 50^{m} 49.82^{s}	−00° 32′ 25.5″	5.78	3.40	97	F2V	
HD 53510				53510	34215	07^{h} 05^{m} 39.00^{s}	+09° 11′ 09.0″	5.78	−0.40	562	M0III	variable star, ΔV = 0.007^{m}, P = 0.088 d
HD 47964				47964	31992	06^{h} 41^{m} 05.45^{s}	+00° 29′ 43.2″	5.79	−1.96	1156	B8III	
HD 55775				55775	34975	07^{h} 14^{m} 10.87^{s}	−03° 54′ 06.3″	5.80	−0.57	613	K5III	
U Mon			U	59693	36521	07^{h} 30^{m} 47.47^{s}	−09° 46′ 36.8″	5.82		2248	K0Ibpvar	RV Tau variable, V_{max} = 5.45^{m}, V_{min} = 7.67^{m}, P = 91.32 d
HD 43157				43157	29629	06^{h} 14^{m} 36.71^{s}	−04° 34′ 06.5″	5.83	−0.56	617	B5V	
HD 57749				57749	35749	07^{h} 22^{m} 25.40^{s}	−05° 58′ 58.1″	5.83	−1.39	908	F3IV	suspected δ Sct variable, V_{max} = 5.80^{m}, V_{min} = 5.84^{m}
HD 59380				59380	36399	07^{h} 29^{m} 25.61^{s}	−07° 33′ 05.3″	5.86	3.64	91	F8V	
HD 45320				45320	30666	06^{h} 26^{m} 39.59^{s}	−01° 30′ 26.2″	5.87	1.64	229	A3Vn	
12 Mon		12		46241	31159	06^{h} 32^{m} 19.23^{s}	+04° 51′ 21.6″	5.87	−0.12	517	K0V	suspected variable, V_{max} = 5.83^{m}, V_{min} = 5.87^{m}
HD 41547				41547	28854	06^{h} 05^{m} 27.02^{s}	−10° 14′ 33.6″	5.88	2.03	192	F4V:	γ Dor variable
HD 45067				45067	30545	06^{h} 25^{m} 16.41^{s}	−00° 56′ 43.3″	5.88	3.28	108	F8V	
HD 48434				48434	32226	06^{h} 43^{m} 38.65^{s}	+03° 55′ 57.1″	5.88		2850	B0III	suspected β Cep variable
HD 51104				51104	33372	06^{h} 56^{m} 25.84^{s}	+09° 57′ 23.8″	5.90	−0.28	561	B8Vn	
HD 55832				55832	34982	07^{h} 14^{m} 15.52^{s}	−09° 56′ 51.1″	5.90	−3.38	2345	K3III	
HD 59984				59984	36640	07^{h} 32^{m} 05.82^{s}	−08° 52′ 51.3″	5.90	3.52	98	F5V	suspected variable, V_{max} = 5.5^{m}, V_{min} = 6.8^{m}
HD 45976				45976	30986	06^{h} 30^{m} 11.28^{s}	−10° 04′ 53.4″	5.92	−5.50	6269	K0	
16 Mon		16		48977	32463	06^{h} 46^{m} 32.42^{s}	+08° 35′ 13.8″	5.92	−1.75	1116	B2.5V	53 Per variable, ΔV = 0.01^{m}, P = 1.94 d
HD 46709				46709	31448	06^{h} 35^{m} 17.60^{s}	+09° 59′ 18.1″	5.93	−2.50	1583	K4III	
HD 52312				52312	33729	07^{h} 00^{m} 23.76^{s}	−08° 24′ 24.6″	5.95	−1.69	1098	B9III	
HD 56207				56207	35127	07^{h} 15^{m} 43.22^{s}	−10° 35′ 01.0″	5.95	0.50	401	K0	
HD 51814				51814	33603	06^{h} 58^{m} 57.03^{s}	+03° 36′ 08.5″	5.96	−1.31	926	G8III	
HD 52913				52913	34002	07^{h} 03^{m} 17.93^{s}	+09° 08′ 18.1″	5.96	1.46	259	A3Vs	
HD 58526				58526	36055	07^{h} 25^{m} 51.20^{s}	−05° 46′ 29.8″	5.98	−2.84	1895	G3Ib	
T Mon			T	44990	30541	06^{h} 25^{m} 13.00^{s}	+07° 05′ 08.6″	5.98		7762	K1Iabv SB	classical Cepheid, V_{max} = 5.58^{m}, V_{min} = 6.62^{m}, P = 27.02 d
HD 43319				43319	29711	06^{h} 15^{m} 29.66^{s}	−04° 54′ 52.7″	5.99	1.87	217	A5IVs	
HD 61749				61749	37394	07^{h} 40^{m} 35.51^{s}	−08° 11′ 07.3″	6.01	1.12	310	A3IV	
HD 55879				55879	34999	07^{h} 14^{m} 28.26^{s}	−10° 18′ 58.5″	6.02	−3.34	2433	B0III	
HD 50890				50890	33243	06^{h} 54^{m} 58.92^{s}	−02° 48′ 12.9″	6.03	−1.90	1259	G6III:	
Plaskett's star			V640	47129	31646	06^{h} 37^{m} 24.04^{s}	+06° 08′ 07.4″	6.05	−5.49	6618	O8I + O7.5III	one of the most massive spectroscopic binaries known; unique variable, V_{max} = 6.04^{m}, V_{min} = 6.08^{m}
HD 46178				46178	31168	06^{h} 32^{m} 23.27^{s}	+11° 40′ 25.0″	6.08	−0.96	834	K0III	
HD 43362				43362	29705	06^{h} 15^{m} 26.16^{s}	−09° 02′ 08.7″	6.09	−0.76	763	B9III	
HD 53929				53929	34338	07^{h} 07^{m} 06.48^{s}	+04° 54′ 38.2″	6.10	−0.59	709	B9.5III	
V721 Mon			V721	44816	30407	06^{h} 23^{m} 35.92^{s}	−09° 52′ 29.1″	6.11	−2.88	2050	K5	slow irregular variable
HD 47420				47420	31733	06^{h} 38^{m} 20.46^{s}	−02° 32′ 38.1″	6.14	−0.63	738	K2	
1 Mon		1	V474	40535	28321	05^{h} 59^{m} 01.07^{s}	−09° 22′ 56.1″	6.15	1.22	316	F2IV	δ Sct variable
HD 42536			V653	42536	29323	06^{h} 11^{m} 01.22^{s}	−06° 45′ 15.1″	6.15	0.01	552	A0sp...	α^{2} CVn variable
HD 42278				42278	29210	06^{h} 09^{m} 36.21^{s}	−05° 42′ 41.2″	6.16	2.23	199	F3IVw	
HD 45321				45321	30660	06^{h} 26^{m} 34.45^{s}	−04° 35′ 50.6″	6.16	−1.69	1212	B2.5V	
HD 45512				45512	30804	06^{h} 28^{m} 18.80^{s}	+10° 18′ 14.4″	6.16	1.74	249	K2III-IV	
HR 2517			V715	49567	32682	06^{h} 49^{m} 03.66^{s}	+01° 00′ 07.5″	6.16	−2.75	1976	B3II-III	53 Per variable
HD 63894				63894	38307	07^{h} 50^{m} 55.24^{s}	−11° 07′ 42.7″	6.16	0.66	411	K0	
HD 45724				45724	30906	06^{h} 29^{m} 14.81^{s}	+02° 38′ 46.6″	6.17	−0.91	851	M1	suspected variable
HD 45995				45995	31066	06^{h} 31^{m} 09.56^{s}	+11° 15′ 05.0″	6.17	−4.98	5525	B2V:nne	suspected variable
HD 47220				47220	31672	06^{h} 37^{m} 40.35^{s}	+02° 42′ 15.4″	6.17	0.35	475	K1III	
V638 Mon			V638	42657	29401	06^{h} 11^{m} 43.72^{s}	−04° 39′ 55.6″	6.18	−0.11	591	B9MNp...	α^{2} CVn variable, V_{max} = 6.16^{m}, V_{min} = 6.18^{m}, P = 0.72 d
HD 48348				48348	32177	06^{h} 43^{m} 06.61^{s}	+03° 02′ 01.8″	6.18	−0.84	827	K0	
HD 47886				47886	32012	06^{h} 41^{m} 17.22^{s}	+11° 00′ 11.4″	6.19	−3.27	2547	M1III	semiregular variable
HD 50820				50820	33210	06^{h} 54^{m} 42.04^{s}	−01° 45′ 23.3″	6.20	−4.54	4592	B3IVe+...	suspected variable, V_{max} = 6.16^{m}, V_{min} = 6.28^{m}
HD 52611				52611	33873	07^{h} 01^{m} 52.91^{s}	−01° 20′ 44.8″	6.20	0.63	424	K0	
V731 Mon			V731	47240	31697	06^{h} 37^{m} 52.70^{s}	+04° 57′ 24.0″	6.20		4803	B1Ib	α Cyg variable
HD 44037				44037	30028	06^{h} 19^{m} 07.94^{s}	−08° 35′ 09.7″	6.22	0.78	399	B9V	
V689 Mon			V689	47432	31766	06^{h} 38^{m} 38.19^{s}	+01° 36′ 48.7″	6.23	−3.86	3396	O9.5II	α Cyg variable, V_{max} = 6.19^{m}, V_{min} = 6.26^{m}, P = 3.55 d
HD 54662				54662	34536	07^{h} 09^{m} 20.25^{s}	−10° 20′ 47.7″	6.23	−5.03	5821	O7III	
HD 57708				57708	35737	07^{h} 22^{m} 18.59^{s}	−02° 58′ 45.0″	6.23	−0.06	591	F5	
HD 44783				44783	30448	06^{h} 24^{m} 02.29^{s}	+08° 53′ 06.1″	6.24	−0.82	842	B8Vn	
HD 59669				59669	36526	07^{h} 30^{m} 51.14^{s}	−05° 13′ 35.3″	6.24	−5.80	8359	K0	
HD 51693				51693	33584	06^{h} 58^{m} 38.93^{s}	+07° 37′ 20.5″	6.25	1.93	238	A3V	
HD 67159				67159	39675	08^{h} 06^{m} 27.42^{s}	−09° 14′ 40.1″	6.25	−0.68	793	B9V	
HD 60853				60853	37000	07^{h} 36^{m} 16.67^{s}	−08° 18′ 40.7″	6.27	−0.13	620	K2	slow irregular variable, V_{max} = 6.26^{m}, V_{min} = 6.29^{m}
HD 50931				50931	33297	06^{h} 55^{m} 34.63^{s}	+08° 19′ 27.4″	6.28	1.22	335	A0V	variable star, ΔV = 0.005^{m}, P = 0.49 d
HD 56614				56614	35301	07^{h} 17^{m} 31.68^{s}	−06° 40′ 48.1″	6.29	−2.28	1689	K2	suspected variable
HD 52265				52265	33719	07^{h} 00^{m} 18.10^{s}	−05° 22′ 02.5″	6.3	4.05	91	G0V	Citalá, has two planets (b and c)
HD 44333				44333	30217	06^{h} 21^{m} 25.78^{s}	+02° 16′ 06.9″	6.30	1.25	334	A4.5V	Algol variable, V_{max} = 6.25^{m}, V_{min} = 6.33^{m}
HD 50282				50282	32990	06^{h} 52^{m} 22.87^{s}	−05° 18′ 58.5″	6.30	0.48	477	K0	
HD 50371				50371	33082	06^{h} 53^{m} 22.40^{s}	+10° 59′ 49.0″	6.30	0.77	416	K0III	
HD 49976			V592	49976	32838	06^{h} 50^{m} 42.31^{s}	−08° 02′ 27.6″	6.31	1.29	330	A2p SrCrEu	α^{2} CVn variable, V_{max} = 6.16^{m}, V_{min} = 6.32^{m}, P = 2.98 d
HD 51424				51424	33420	06^{h} 57^{m} 00.10^{s}	−08° 10′ 45.4″	6.31	−0.93	913	A2V+...	
HD 67725				67725	39898	08^{h} 08^{m} 56.85^{s}	−11° 20′ 22.7″	6.31	−0.44	729	A0Vn	
HD 45168				45168	30595	06^{h} 25^{m} 47.14^{s}	−03° 53′ 20.5″	6.33	−1.18	1035	G9III	
HD 51892				51892	33644	06^{h} 59^{m} 20.18^{s}	+07° 19′ 01.2″	6.34	−1.60	1264	B7III	
HD 66242				66242	39326	08^{h} 02^{m} 25.97^{s}	−06° 20′ 13.6″	6.34	1.15	355	G0III	
HD 45380				45380	30675	06^{h} 26^{m} 44.85^{s}	−07° 30′ 42.9″	6.35	0.86	409	A0Vn	variable star, ΔV = 0.010^{m}, P = 21.97 d
HD 48099				48099	32067	06^{h} 41^{m} 59.23^{s}	+06° 20′ 43.5″	6.36		2750	O5.5V((f)) + O9V	
HD 50062				50062	32931	06^{h} 51^{m} 39.37^{s}	+03° 02′ 31.4″	6.37	1.57	298	A2Vs	
HD 45090				45090	30602	06^{h} 25^{m} 52.33^{s}	+11° 07′ 33.3″	6.39	0.67	454	A0	
HD 47156				47156	31662	06^{h} 37^{m} 36.92^{s}	+10° 51′ 12.1″	6.39	−0.77	883	K0	
HD 50700				50700	33154	06^{h} 54^{m} 08.60^{s}	−05° 51′ 07.9″	6.39	0.21	562	A6Vn	
HD 45239				45239	30608	06^{h} 25^{m} 58.83^{s}	−07° 53′ 41.9″	6.40	0.24	556	A4V	
HD 66950				66950	39625	08^{h} 05^{m} 49.64^{s}	−00° 34′ 24.0″	6.40	−0.30	712	K0	suspected variable
HD 44700				44700	30382	06^{h} 23^{m} 18.49^{s}	+03° 45′ 52.2″	6.41	−1.23	1098	B3V	variable star, ΔV = 0.010^{m}, P = 31.10 d
V695 Mon			V695	65875	39172	08^{h} 00^{m} 44.14^{s}	−02° 52′ 54.9″	6.42	−3.48	3105	B2.5Ve	γ Cas variable, V_{max} = 6.42^{m}, V_{min} = 6.53^{m}
HD 45215				45215	30627	06^{h} 26^{m} 09.60^{s}	−03° 30′ 57.1″	6.42	0.34	536	G5	
24 Mon		24		56003	35080	07^{h} 15^{m} 19.41^{s}	−00° 09′ 40.7″	6.42	0.36	530	G5III	
HD 57682				57682	35707	07^{h} 22^{m} 02.05^{s}	−08° 58′ 45.9″	6.42	−4.03	4009	O9V	suspected variable, V_{max} = 6.34^{m}, V_{min} = 6.45^{m}
14 Mon		14		46642	31385	06^{h} 34^{m} 46.33^{s}	+07° 34′ 21.0″	6.44	1.21	362	A0Vs	suspected variable
HD 53240				53240	34066	07^{h} 03^{m} 57.46^{s}	−10° 07′ 25.6″	6.44	−1.52	1273	B9IIIn	
HD 65938				65938	39198	08^{h} 01^{m} 03.45^{s}	−06° 25′ 08.7″	6.45	2.33	217	G5	
HD 42132				42132	29140	06^{h} 08^{m} 47.72^{s}	−06° 49′ 17.0″	6.46	1.23	363	G5	
HD 45563				45563	30798	06^{h} 28^{m} 16.77^{s}	+01° 54′ 45.8″	6.48	0.60	489	B9V	
HD 52382				52382	33754	07^{h} 00^{m} 39.34^{s}	−09° 12′ 10.7″	6.49	−3.28	2937	B1Ib	suspected variable, V_{max} = 6.47^{m}, V_{min} = 6.5^{m}
9 Mon		9		45418	30700	06^{h} 27^{m} 00.88^{s}	−04° 21′ 20.3″	6.50	−1.10	1079	B4V	
V569 Mon			V569	53755	34234	07^{h} 05^{m} 49.64^{s}	−10° 39′ 36.3″	6.50	−3.68	3543	B0.5IVn	β Cep variable, V_{max} = 6.42^{m}, V_{min} = 6.53^{m}, P = 0.27 d
IM Mon			IM	44701	30351	06^{h} 23^{m} 01.47^{s}	−03° 16′ 37.1″	6.54		991	B5V	β Lyr variable
HD 50281A				50281	32984	06^{h} 52^{m} 18.05^{s}	−05° 10′ 25.4″	6.57		28.395	K3.5V	component of the HD 50281 system
V926 Mon			V926	52690	33891	07^{h} 02^{m} 06.73^{s}	−03° 45′ 17.4″	6.62		1920	M1Ib	semiregular variable, V_{max} = 6.50^{m}, V_{min} = 6.70^{m}, P = 39 d
HD 50138			V743	50138	32923	06^{h} 51^{m} 33.40^{s}	−06° 57′ 59.5″	6.67		1280	B9e	FS CMa variable, V_{max} = 6.53^{m}, V_{min} = 6.87^{m}
ε Mon B	ε			44770	30422	06^{h} 23^{m} 46.50^{s}	+04° 35′ 45.1″	6.72	4.79	79	F5V	component of the ε Mon system
HD 46150				46150	31130	06^{h} 31^{m} 55.52^{s}	+04° 56′ 34.3″	6.75		5200	O5V((f))	in NGC 2244; variable star, ΔV = 0.008^{m}
6 Mon		6		43760	29885	06^{h} 17^{m} 35.13^{s}	−10° 43′ 30.0″	6.76	−0.87	1094	F0e...	
AX Mon			AX	45910	31019	06^{h} 30^{m} 32.94^{s}	+05° 52′ 01.2″	6.85		12000	B2IIIe	unique variable, V_{max} = 6.59^{m}, V_{min} = 6.94^{m}, P = 232.5 d
HD 46966				46966	31567	06^{h} 36^{m} 25.89^{s}	+06° 04′ 59.5″	6.87			O8V	variable star, ΔV = 0.006^{m}
V Mon			V	44639	30326	06^{h} 22^{m} 43.50^{s}	−02° 11′ 42.0″	6.87		2194	M6e	Mira variable, V_{max} = 6^{m}, V_{min} = 13.9^{m}, P = 340.5 d
V644 Mon			V644	51480	33436	06^{h} 57^{m} 09.38^{s}	−10° 49′ 28.1″	6.93		4900	Ape	γ Cas variable, V_{max} = 6.88^{m}, V_{min} = 6.98^{m}
HD 53367			V750	53367	34116	07^{h} 04^{m} 25.53^{s}	−10° 27′ 15.7″	6.96		932	B0IV:e	γ Cas variable, V_{max} = 6.92^{m}, V_{min} = 7.22^{m}
Gliese 282 A			V869	61606	37349	07^{h} 39^{m} 59.33^{s}	−03° 35′ 51.0″	7.18		46.33	K2V	component of the Gliese 282 system; BY Dra variable, ΔV = 0.02^{m}
V505 Mon			V505	48914	32397	06^{h} 45^{m} 49.98^{s}	+02° 29′ 57.4″	7.22		2170	B5Ib	β Lyr variable, V_{max} = 7.15^{m}, V_{min} = 7.65^{m}, P = 53.78 d
V614 Mon			V614	52432	33794	07^{h} 01^{m} 01.95^{s}	−03° 15′ 09.1″	7.27		1550	C...	semiregular variable, V_{max} = 7.01^{m}, V_{min} = 7.36^{m}, P = 60 d
HD 46223				46223	31149	06^{h} 32^{m} 09.31^{s}	+04° 49′ 24.7″	7.28		5200	O5e	in NGC 2244; variable star, ΔV = 0.008^{m}
HD 46149				46149	31128	06^{h} 31^{m} 52.53^{s}	+05° 01′ 59.2″	7.61		5200	O8.5V+B	in NGC 2244; spectroscopic binary; rotating and pulsating variable
HD 44219				44219	30114	06^{h} 20^{m} 14.32^{s}	−10° 43′ 30.0″	7.70	4.19	164	G5	has a planet (b)
HD 46375				46375	31246	06^{h} 33^{m} 12.62^{s}	+05° 27′ 46.5″	7.84	5.22	109	K1V	has a planet (b)
HD 59435			V827	59435	36419	07^{h} 29^{m} 35.45^{s}	−09° 15′ 33.3″	7.97		1210	A5p	α^{2} CVn variable, V_{max} = 7.97^{m}, V_{min} = 7.99^{m}, P = 3.59 d
HD 45583			V682	45583	30789	06^{h} 28^{m} 10.76^{s}	−04° 53′ 56.5″	7.97		962	B9	α^{2} CVn variable
HD 46380			V728	46380	31199	06^{h} 32^{m} 43.23^{s}	−07° 30′ 32.3″	8.00		1480	B2Vne	Be star
HD 45652				45652	30905	06^{h} 29^{m} 13.19^{s}	+10° 56′ 02.0″	8.13	5.34	118	G8-K0	Lusitânia, has a planet (b)
HD 46202				46202		06^{h} 32^{m} 10.47^{s}	+04° 57′ 59.8″	8.18		5200	O9V	in NGC 2244; β Cep variable, ΔV = 0.01^{m}, P = 0.21 d
HD 66428				66428	39417	08^{h} 03^{m} 28.67^{s}	−01° 09′ 45.8″	8.25	4.55	180	G5	has a planet (b)
V753 Mon			V753	54975	34684	07^{h} 10^{m} 57.85^{s}	−03° 52′ 43.2″	8.27		605	A8V	Algol variable, V_{max} = 8.30^{m}, V_{min} = 8.81^{m}, P = 0.68 d
V723 Mon			V723	45762	30891	06^{h} 29^{m} 04.66^{s}	−05° 34′ 20.2″	8.28		1700	G0II	Long period variable, potential black hole binary
SV Mon			SV	44320	30219	06^{h} 21^{m} 26.30^{s}	+06° 28′ 12.6″	8.28			G7II...	classical Cepheid, V_{max} = 7.61^{m}, V_{min} = 8.88^{m}, P = 15.23 d
HD 50064				50064		06^{h} 51^{m} 34.11^{s}	+00° 17′ 50.4″	8.30		9500	B6:Ia	one of the most luminous stars known; α Cyg variable, V_{max} = 8.02^{m}, V_{min} = 8.41^{m}, P = 60 d
HD 47755			V684	47755		06^{h} 40^{m} 38.30^{s}	+09° 47′ 15.8″	8.41			B4	Algol variable, V_{max} = 8.32^{m}, V_{min} = 8.41^{m}, P = 1.85 d
UX Mon			UX	65607	39042	07^{h} 59^{m} 16.38^{s}	−07° 30′ 17.9″	8.42		5500	A3	Algol and δ Sct variable, V_{max} = 8.22^{m}, V_{min} = 9.16^{m}, P = 5.90 d
AU Mon			AU	50846	33237	06^{h} 54^{m} 54.71^{s}	−01° 22′ 32.8″	8.43			B5IV + F8-G0III-II	double periodic or Algol variable, V_{max} = 8.20^{m}, V_{min} = 9.16^{m}, P = 11.11 d
HD 47732			V641	47732	31939	06^{h} 40^{m} 28.59^{s}	+09° 49′ 04.3″	8.46		2190	B3Vnn...	rotating ellipsoidal variable, ΔV = 0.07^{m}, P = 1.32 d
V578 Mon			V578	259135		06^{h} 32^{m} 00.61^{s}	+04° 52′ 40.9″	8.55			B1:V:n	Algol variable, V_{max} = 8.54^{m}, V_{min} = 8.57^{m}, P = 2.41 d
HD 259431			V700	259431	31235	06^{h} 33^{m} 05.19^{s}	+10° 19′ 20.0″	8.72		564	B6ep	Orion variable, V_{max} = 8.62^{m}, V_{min} = 8.91^{m}
AR Mon			AR	57364	35600	07^{h} 20^{m} 48.45^{s}	−05° 15′ 35.8″	8.79		962	K0II	RS CVn variable, V_{max} = 8.62^{m}, V_{min} = 9.47^{m}, P = 21.21 d
Gliese 282 B				61606B		07^{h} 40^{m} 02.88^{s}	−03° 36′ 13.4″	8.93		46.33	K7V +	component of the Gliese 282 system
HD 44179			V777	44179	30089	06^{h} 19^{m} 58.22^{s}	−10° 38′ 14.7″	8.94		1245	B8V	central star of Red Rectangle Nebula; re-radiating binary system, V_{max} = 8.78^{m}, V_{min} = 8.94^{m}, P = 320 d
HD 49330			V739	49330	32586	06^{h} 47^{m} 57.27^{s}	+00° 46′ 34.0″	8.95		1460	B0.5IVe	γ Cas variable, V_{max} = 8.72^{m}, V_{min} = 9.02^{m}
HD 50169				50169	32965	06^{h} 51^{m} 59.23^{s}	−01° 38′ 40.4″	8.99	1.69	1489	A4p	Brewer's Star
FU Mon			FU	44544	30301	06^{h} 22^{m} 23.85^{s}	+03° 25′ 27.9″	9.06		2490	S6.5/7.5	semiregular variable
TU Mon			TU		38523	07^{h} 53^{m} 19.75^{s}	−03° 02′ 31.1″	9.24		1960	B5V + F3	Algol variable
RW Mon			RW	259986	31383	06^{h} 34^{m} 45.89^{s}	+08° 49′ 32.18″	9.32		738	B8V + G5IV	Algol variable, V_{max} = 9.26^{m}, V_{min} = 11.51^{m}, P = 1.91 d
VV Mon			VV		34003	07^{h} 03^{m} 18.29^{s}	−05° 44′ 15.5″	9.40		434	G0	RS CVn variable, V_{max} = 9.4^{m}, V_{min} = 9.95^{m}, P = 6.05 d
BX Mon			BX			07^{h} 25^{m} 22.78^{s}	−03° 35′ 15.8″	9.50			M5IIIpe	Z And variable, V_{max} = 9.5^{m}, V_{min} = 12.5^{m}, P = 1259 d
PZ Mon			PZ	289114	32621	06^{h} 48^{m} 21.07^{s}	+01° 13′ 08.3″	9.60		2080	K2Ve	irregular variable
V694 Mon			V694			07^{h} 25^{m} 51.29^{s}	−07° 44′ 08.1″	9.70		1550	C...	Z And variable, V_{max} = 9.2^{m}, V_{min} = 11.4^{m}, P = 1931 d
AO Mon			AO	53883	34299	07^{h} 06^{m} 36.30^{s}	−04° 37′ 24.5″	9.72			B3 + B5	Algol and δ Sct variable, V_{max} = 9.6^{m}, V_{min} = 10.23^{m}, P = 1.88 d
V588 Mon			V588	261331		06^{h} 39^{m} 05.90^{s}	+09° 41′ 03.4″	9.75			A7III/IV	δ Sct variable, V_{max} = 9.66^{m}, V_{min} = 9.72^{m}, P = 0.11 d
V372 Mon			V372			06^{h} 41^{m} 26.13^{s}	−04° 35′ 45.8″	9.81			SC7/7.5	semiregular variable
CV Mon			CV		31624	06^{h} 37^{m} 04.84^{s}	+03° 03′ 50.2″	9.90				in C0634+031; classical Cepheid, V_{max} = 9.9^{m}, V_{min} = 10.7^{m}, P = 5.38 d
G 112-29					36985	07^{h} 36^{m} 07.08^{s}	−03° 06′ 38.8″	9.99		46.21	M:	component of the Gliese 282 system; rotating variable, V_{max} = 0.19^{m}, V_{min} = 12.16^{m}
HD 50281B				50281B		06^{h} 52^{m} 18.05^{s}	−05° 11′ 24.2″	10.05			M2	component of the HD 50281 system
V589 Mon			V589	261446		06^{h} 39^{m} 28.46^{s}	+09° 42′ 04.1″	10.27			F2III	δ Sct variable, ΔV = 0.05^{m}, P = 0.12 d
BE Mon			BE		31905	06^{h} 40^{m} 05.58^{s}	+07° 36′ 21.0″	10.5			G5	classical Cepheid, V_{max} = 10.19^{m}, V_{min} = 10.88^{m}, P = 2.71 d
RU Mon			RU		33163	06^{h} 54^{m} 12.31^{s}	−07° 35′ 45.0″	10.51			B9pv + B7V + B7.2V	Algol variable, V_{max} = 10.33^{m}, V_{min} = 11.18^{m}, P = 3.58 d
CL Mon			CL			06^{h} 55^{m} 36.70^{s}	+06° 22′ 43.3″	11.00			C...	Mira variable, V_{max} = 8.1^{m}, V_{min} = 13.0^{m}, P = 493 d
Ross 614			V577		30920	06^{h} 29^{m} 23.40^{s}	−02° 48′ 50.3″	11.08	13.01	13.4	M4.5V + M8V	binary star; one component is a flare star
DD Mon			DD	292319		06^{h} 45^{m} 57.83^{s}	−00° 07′ 31.9″				G0	Algol variable
A0620-00			V616			06^{h} 22^{m} 44.50^{s}	−00° 20′ 44.7″	11.2			K3V-K7V	X-ray nova and rotating ellipsoidal variable, V_{max} = 11.0^{m}, V_{min} = 18.3^{m}, P = 0.32 d
CS Mon			CS			06^{h} 32^{m} 10.94^{s}	+06° 39′ 11.0″	11.25				classical Cepheid, V_{max} = 10.71^{m}, V_{min} = 11.3^{m}, P = 6.73 d
COROT-7						06^{h} 43^{m} 49.47^{s}	−01° 03′ 46.9″	11.73	5.85	489	K0V	has two planets (b & c) and one unconfirmed planet (d)
R Mon			R			06^{h} 39^{m} 09.95^{s}	+08° 44′ 10.8″	11.85			B0	in NGC 2261; Orion variable
BN Mon			BN			06^{h} 21^{m} 58.00^{s}	+07° 20′ 57.7″	12.70			Nv...	semiregular variable
V396 Mon			V396			06^{h} 38^{m} 36.48^{s}	+03° 36′ 17.1″					W UMa variable
V590 Mon			V590			06^{h} 40^{m} 44.64^{s}	+09° 48′ 02.1″	12.88			B7	Orion variable
COROT-4						06^{h} 48^{m} 46.70^{s}	−00° 40′ 22.0″	13.45			F0V	has a transiting planet (b)
COROT-1						06^{h} 48^{m} 19.17^{s}	−03° 06′ 07.8″	13.6	5.2	1560	G0V	first transiting planet by COROT mission (b)
VY Mon			VY			06^{h} 31^{m} 06.92^{s}	+10° 26′ 05.0″	13.70			B8	UX Ori star
COROT-5						06^{h} 45^{m} 06.54^{s}	+00° 48′ 54.9″	14	6	1300	F9V	has a transiting planet (b)
COROT-20						06^{h} 30^{m} 53^{s}	+00° 13′ 37″	14.66		4012	G2V	has a transiting planet (b)
COROT-19						06^{h} 28^{m} 08^{s}	−00° 01′ 01″	14.78		2609	F9V	has a transiting planet (b)
COROT-18						06^{h} 32^{m} 41^{s}	−00° 01′ 54″	14.99		2838	G9	has a transiting planet (b)
COROT-13						06^{h} 50^{m} 53.07^{s}	−05° 05′ 11.1″	15.04	4.45	4270	G0V	has a transiting planet (b)
BT Mon			BT			06^{h} 43^{m} 47.24^{s}	−02° 01′ 13.9″	15.4			G5V	nova and Algol variable, V_{max} = 4.5^{m}, V_{min} = 16.4^{m}, P = 0.33 d
COROT-12						06^{h} 43^{m} 03.76^{s}	−01° 17′ 47.1″	15.52	5.21	3760	G2V	has a transiting planet (b)
V838 Mon			V838			07^{h} 04^{m} 04.85^{s}	−03° 50′ 51.1″	15.74		20000	M6I/III + B3V	luminous red nova, V_{max} = 6.7^{m}, V_{min} = 16.05^{m}
COROT-14						06^{h} 53^{m} 41.80^{s}	−05° 32′ 09.7″	16.03	5.40	4360	F9V	has a transiting planet (b)
CW Mon			CW			06^{h} 36^{m} 54.58^{s}	+00° 02′ 17.3″	17.2		5500	A3	SS Cyg variable, V_{max} = 11.9^{m}, V_{min} = 17.2^{m}, P = 0.18 d
Scholz's Star						07^{h} 20^{m} 03.25^{s}	−08° 46′ 49.9″	18.3	19.4	19.65	M9.5+T5C	Binary star
AFGL 961						06^{h} 34^{m} 37.63^{s}	+04° 12′ 42.8″				K3V-K7V	young stellar object
Monoceros R2 IRS 3						06^{h} 47^{m} 47.8^{s}	−06° 22′ 55″					young stellar object
NGC 2264 IRS 1						06^{h} 41^{m} 10.06^{s}	+09° 29′ 35.8″				B2	in NGC 2264; young stellar object
UGPS J072227.51-054031.2						07^{h} 22^{m} 27.87^{s}	−05° 40′ 31.1″			13	T9	brown dwarf

== See also ==
- List of stars by constellation
