= Monoceros in Chinese astronomy =

According to traditional Chinese uranography, the modern constellation Monoceros is located within the southern quadrant of the sky, which is symbolized as the Vermillion Bird of the South (南方朱雀, Nán Fāng Zhū Què).

The name of the western constellation in modern Chinese is 麒麟座 (qí lín zuò), meaning "the qilin constellation".

== Stars ==
The map of Chinese constellation in constellation Monoceros area consists of :

Four Symbols	Mansion (Chinese name)	Romanization	Translation	Asterisms (Chinese name)	Romanization	Translation	Western star name	Chinese star name	Romanization	Translation
Vermilion Bird of the South (南方朱雀)	井	Jǐng	Well	四瀆	Sìdú	Four Great Rivers				
Vermilion Bird of the South (南方朱雀)	井	Jǐng	Well	四瀆	Sìdú	Four Great Rivers	17 Mon	四瀆二	Sìdúèr	2nd star
Vermilion Bird of the South (南方朱雀)	井	Jǐng	Well	四瀆	Sìdú	Four Great Rivers	13 Mon	四瀆三	Sìdúsān	3rd star
Vermilion Bird of the South (南方朱雀)	井	Jǐng	Well	四瀆	Sìdú	Four Great Rivers	ε Mon	四瀆四	Sìdúsì	4th star
Vermilion Bird of the South (南方朱雀)	井	Jǐng	Well	闕丘	Quèqiū	Palace Gate				
Vermilion Bird of the South (南方朱雀)	井	Jǐng	Well	闕丘	Quèqiū	Palace Gate	18 Mon	闕丘一	Quèqiūyī	1st star
Vermilion Bird of the South (南方朱雀)	井	Jǐng	Well	闕丘	Quèqiū	Palace Gate	δ Mon	闕丘二	Quèqiūèr	2nd star

== See also ==
- Traditional Chinese star names
- Chinese constellations
