= T Monocerotis =

Cepheid Variable in constellation of Monoceros

- Location of T Monocerotis (circled in red)

Observation data Epoch J2000.0 Equinox ICRS
- Constellation: Monoceros
- Right ascension: 06^{h} 25^{m} 13.00^{s}
- Declination: +07° 05′ 08.6″
- Apparent magnitude (V): 5.58–6.58

Characteristics
- Evolutionary stage: Supergiant + Main-sequence
- Spectral type: G3Iabv + A0p
- Variable type: δ Cep

Astrometry
Radial velocity (R_{v})	+48.8±9.1 km/s
Proper motion (μ)	RA: +0.846 mas/yr Dec.: −3.025 mas/yr
Parallax (π)	0.533±0.066 mas
Distance	approx. 6,100 ly (approx. 1,900 pc)

Other designations
- T Mon, BD+07 1273, HD 44990, HIP 30541, HR 2310, SAO 113845, TIC 206703838, TYC 145-875-1, IRAS 06225+0706, 2MASS J06251300+0705084

Database references
SIMBAD	data

T Monocerotis (T Mon) is a classical Cepheid variable star in the constellation of Monoceros, visually located 2° northwest of Epsilon Monocerotis. Along with Eta Aquilae and X Sagittarii, it is one of the Cepheid variables considered easy to find in the night sky. It is located 1350 parsecs or 4400 light-years from the solar system. The brightness of T Monocerotis varies between apparent magnitude +5.58 and +6.62 over a period of 27.0247 days. This period has been increasing over time, being 27.0092 days before the year 1900.

== Charecterstics and observation ==
T Monocerotis is a classic Cepheid variable, a class of young pulsating Population I stars, usually supergiants with a luminosity and size considerably greater than the Sun. The effective temperature of T Monocerotis is approximately 5200K and its luminosity is 4985 times greater than solar luminosity. Its average radius is 131 times larger than that of the Sun, equivalent to 0.61 AU. However, due to the pulsations it experiences, the difference between its maximum and minimum radius is equal to 33 times the solar radius. It has a mass approximately seven times greater than the mass of the sun. It has a higher metallic content than the Sun ([Fe/H] = +0.23). All the elements evaluated, with the exception of manganese, are "overabundant" in relation to solar levels, with lanthanum standing out in this regard, its relative abundance being 3.5 times greater.

Mid-infrared interferometry with the Very Large Telescope Interferometer (VLTI/MIDI) in 2013 revealed an extended molecular envelope around T Monocerotis, extending to about 40 stellar radii at 8.6 μm. This envelope, likely composed of dust and gas ejected during the star's evolution, is asymmetric and shows evidence of mass loss, consistent with other Galactic Cepheids.

=== Companion ===
T Monocerotis is a single-lined spectroscopic binary with a hot companion detected via ultraviolet spectroscopy with the International Ultraviolet Explorer (IUE) in 1980. The companion, likely a A-type main-sequence star, contributes significantly to the system's UV flux, showing absorption lines from highly ionized in C IV and Si IV. The orbital period aligns with the Cepheid's pulsation period (~27 days), complicating velocity measurements, but preliminary orbital elements suggest an eccentricity of ~0.5 and a semi-amplitude K ≈ 20 km/s for the primary. Historical radial velocity data from over 80 years support the binary hypothesis.
