= NGC 2349 =

Open cluster in the constellation Monoceros

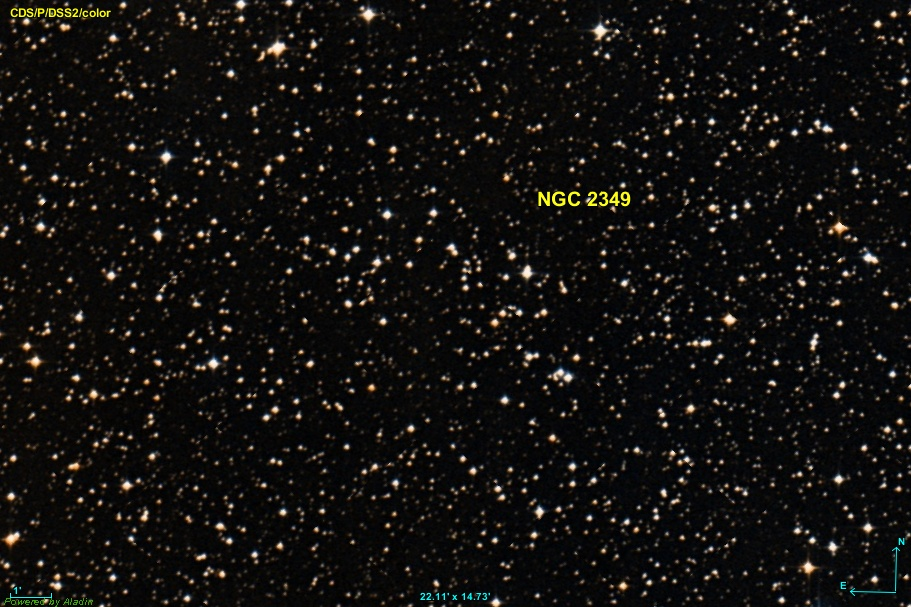

Observation data (J2000 epoch)
- Right ascension: 07^{h} 10.0^{m}
- Declination: −08° 37′
- Apparent dimensions (V): 10′x 5′

Physical characteristics

Associations
- Constellation: Monoceros

NGC 2349 is an open cluster of stars in the constellation Monoceros. It was discovered by Caroline Herschel in 1783.
