= 3C 195 =

Radio galaxy in the constellation of Monoceros

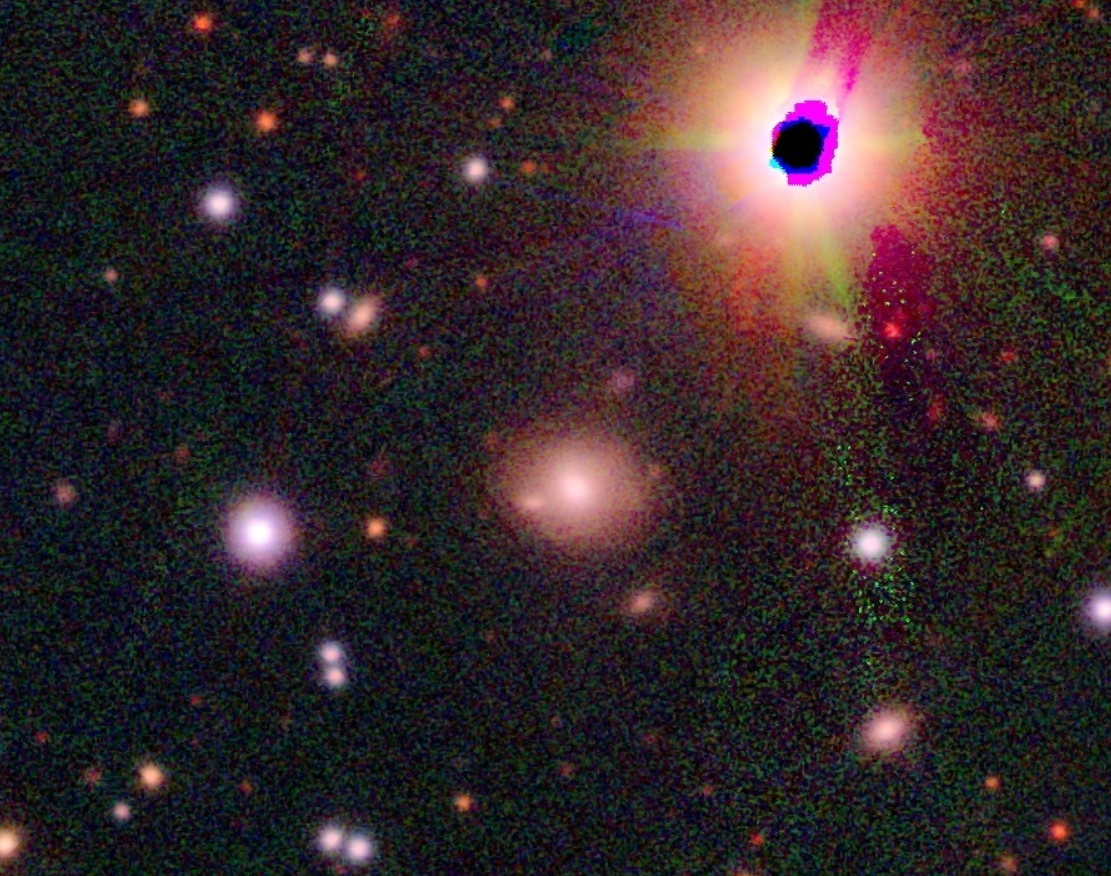
- Pan-STARRS image of 3C 195.

Observation data (J2000.0 epoch)
- Constellation: Monoceros
- Right ascension: 08^{h} 08^{m} 53.62^{s}
- Declination: −10° 27′ 39.66″
- Redshift: 0.108985
- Heliocentric radial velocity: 32,673 km/s
- Distance: 1.463 Gly
- Apparent magnitude (B): 17.14

Characteristics
- Type: N galaxy Sy
- Size: ~284,000 ly (87.0 kpc) (estimated)

Other designations
- PKS 0806−10, IRAS 08065−1018, LEDA 977932, 2MASX J08085360−1027397, 6dF J0808535−102740, OJ −111, NRAO 0283, MSH 08−104, G4Jy 0685, PAPER J122.34−10.43

3C 195 is a Fanaroff-Riley class Type 2 radio galaxy located in the constellation of Monoceros. The redshift of the galaxy is (z) 0.108 and it was first discovered as a discrete source in 1962 by astronomers. Its emission lines are strong and extended.

== Description ==
3C 195 is a high-power radio galaxy with an estimated radio power of 10^{25.9} W Hz^{−1}. It is hosted by an elliptical galaxy that is located in a relatively rich galaxy environment. The host galaxy is also interacting with a less luminous smaller companion that is 11 kiloparsecs away from it. The appearance of the host galaxy is disturbed, given it displays the presence of fan and shell structures. Several chains of radio emission knots are located close to the center of the galaxy. A broad arc-like structure extends from the north to the west. The mass of the supermassive black hole of the galaxy has been estimated as 8.85 M_{☉}.

The radio structure of 3C 195 is described as a double-lobed source. A radio map made by the Very Long Baseline Array (VLA) found there are bright hotspot features and complex radio lobes. The radio core has a bright appearance with further evidence of extended structures. Further studies have found the northern hotspot has near-infrared emission that is unassociated with the emission.

Observations of the southern low-power radio hotspot, showed a steep to near-infrared radio spectrum. Radio imaging with the Chandra X-ray Observatory found the emission is enhanced at the base of the radio lobes, in its nucleus and the south knot feature. The north hotspot also showed evidence of minor emission enhancement. In the galaxy's optical spectrum, there are several ionized emission lines.
