= HD 49976 =

Star in the constellation Monoceros

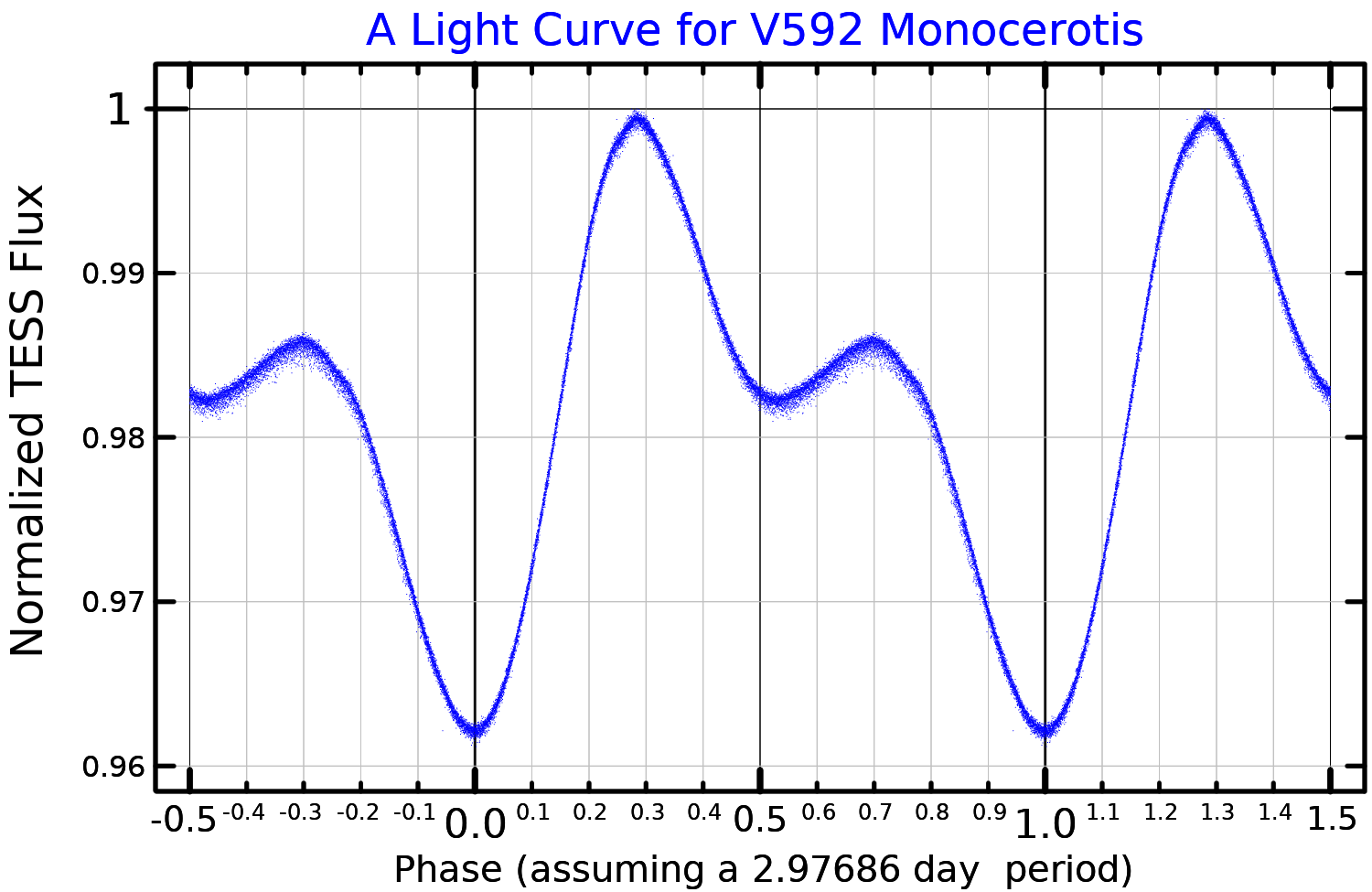
- A light curve for V592 Monocerotis, plotted from TESS data

Observation data Epoch J2000.0 Equinox ICRS
- Constellation: Monoceros
- Right ascension: 06^{h} 50^{m} 42.30314^{s}
- Declination: −08° 02′ 27.5937″
- Apparent magnitude (V): 6.16 to 6.32

Characteristics
- Spectral type: A2p Sr Cr Eu or B9V
- U−B color index: +0.02
- B−V color index: +0.00
- Variable type: α^{2} CVn

Astrometry
Radial velocity (R_{v})	+19.2±2.4 km/s
Proper motion (μ)	RA: −9.794 mas/yr Dec.: +2.720 mas/yr
Parallax (π)	9.6666±0.0529 mas
Distance	337 ± 2 ly (103.4 ± 0.6 pc)
Absolute magnitude (M_{V})	+1.13

Details
Mass	2.21±0.11 M_{☉}
Radius	2.3±0.3 R_{☉}
Luminosity	32 L_{☉}
Surface gravity (log g)	4.04±0.13 cgs
Temperature	9,016 K
Rotation	2.976 days
Rotational velocity (v sin i)	31 km/s
Age	209 Myr

Other designations
- V592 Monocerotis, BD−07°1592, HD 49976, HIP 32838, HR 2534, SAO 133761

Database references
SIMBAD	data

HD 49976 is a variable star in the constellation of Monoceros (the Unicorn). It has the variable star designation V592 Monocerotis, while HD 49976 is the identifier from the Henry Draper Catalogue. It has a white hue and is near the lower limit of visibility to the naked eye, having an apparent visual magnitude that fluctuates from 6.16 down to 6.32 with a 2.976 day period. Based upon parallax measurements, it is located at a distance of approximately 337 light years from the Sun. The star is drifting further away with a radial velocity of +19 km/s.

This is a magnetic chemically peculiar star with a stellar classification of A2p Sr Cr Eu, showing excesses in strontium and the rare earth elements in the photosphere, among others. Houk and Swift (1999) assigned it a class of B9V, matching a B-type main sequence star. It is an Alpha^{2} Canum Venaticorum variable; the magnetic field is complex; not corresponding to a simple dipole.

HD 49976 is an estimated 209 million years old and is spinning with a period of 2.976 days. The star has 2.2 times the mass of the Sun and 2.3 times the Sun's radius. It is radiating 32 times the luminosity of the Sun from its photosphere at an effective temperature of 9,016 K.
