= 3 Monocerotis =

Star in Monoceros constellation

- Location of 3 Monocerotis (circled)

Observation data Epoch J2000 Equinox ICRS
- Constellation: Monoceros
- Right ascension: 06^{h} 01^{m} 50.42241^{s}
- Declination: −10° 35′ 52.5565″
- Apparent magnitude (V): 4.92 (4.98 + 8.25)

Characteristics
- Spectral type: B5 III
- U−B color index: −0.58
- B−V color index: −0.12

Astrometry
Radial velocity (R_{v})	+39.00 km/s
Absolute magnitude (M_{V})	−1.94

A
Proper motion (μ)	RA: −8.282 mas/yr Dec.: 4.385 mas/yr
Parallax (π)	4.5717±0.3115 mas
Distance	710 ± 50 ly (220 ± 10 pc)

B
Proper motion (μ)	RA: 6.990 mas/yr Dec.: 4.574 mas/yr
Parallax (π)	3.1006±0.0960 mas
Distance	1,050 ± 30 ly (323 ± 10 pc)

Details

3 Mon A
Mass	5.85 M_{☉}
Radius	4.5 R_{☉}
Luminosity	1,105 L_{☉}
Temperature	15,000 K
Metallicity [Fe/H]	0.00 dex
Rotational velocity (v sin i)	45 km/s

Other designations
- 3 Mon, BD−10°1349, GC 7631, HD 40967, HIP 28574, HR 2128, SAO 151037, CCDM J06018-1036, WDS J06018-1036

Database references
SIMBAD	data

3 Monocerotis is a binary star system in the equatorial constellation of Monoceros, located approximately 780 light years away from the Sun based on parallax. It is visible to the naked eye as a faint, blue-white hued star with a combined apparent visual magnitude of 4.92. The system is moving further from the Earth with a heliocentric radial velocity of +39 km/s.

The magnitude 4.98 primary, designated component A, has a stellar classification of B5 III, matching an evolved blue giant star. It has 5.85 times the mass of the Sun and is radiating 1,105 times the Sun's luminosity from its photosphere at an effective temperature of 15,000 K. The companion, component B, is magnitude 7.96 with an angular separation of 1.9″ from the primary.
