= HD 259431 =

Young stellar object in the constellation Monoceros

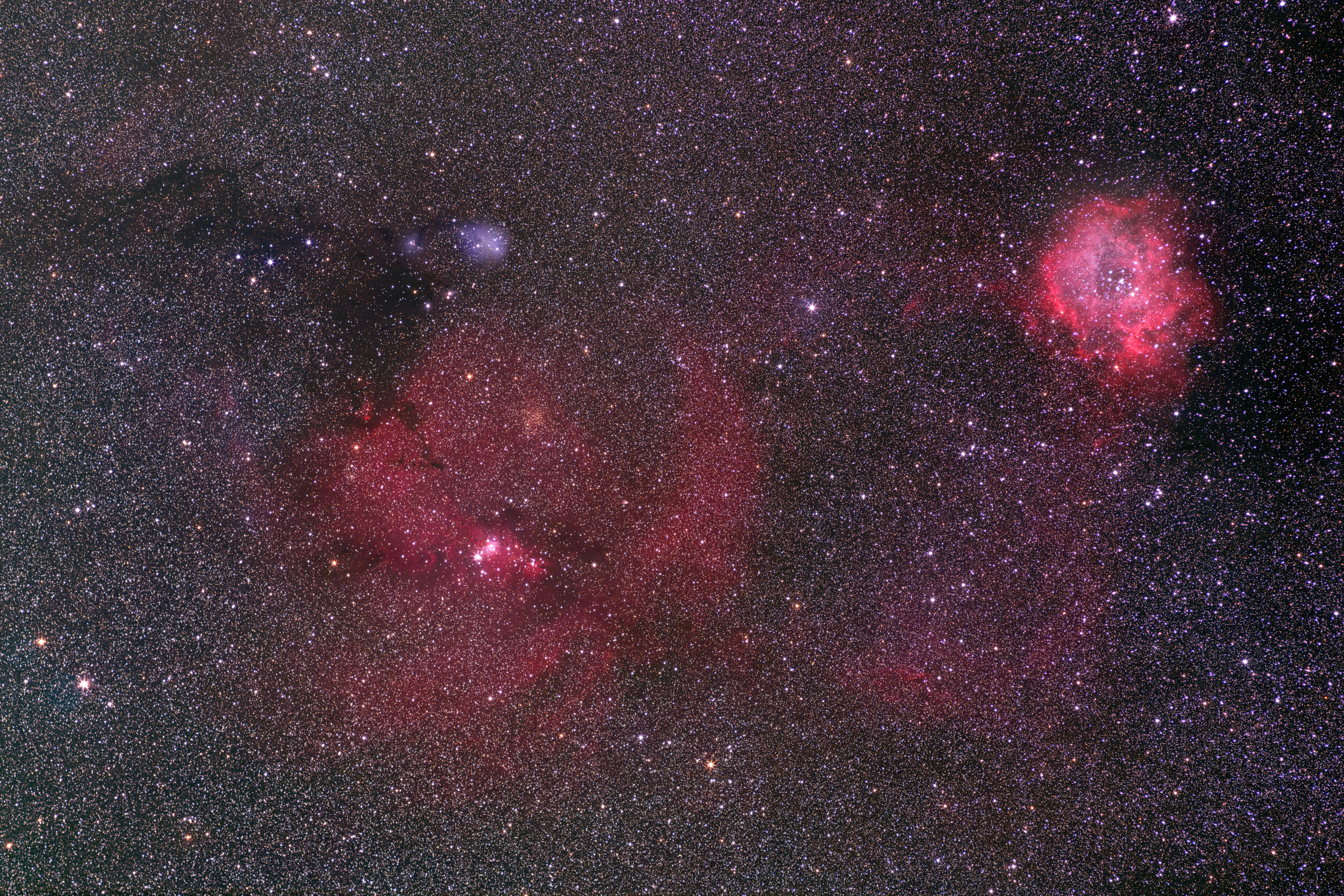
- Location of HD 259431 (circled) near the bluish IC 447 nebulosity. NGC 2264 is below (west) and the Rosette Nebula on the right (south). Credit: ESO/S. Guisard

Observation data Epoch J2000 Equinox J2000
- Constellation: Monoceros
- Right ascension: 06^{h} 33^{m} 05.19064^{s}
- Declination: +10° 19′ 19.9826″
- Apparent magnitude (V): 8.62 - 8.91

Characteristics
- Spectral type: B6e
- U−B color index: −0.540
- B−V color index: 0.286
- Variable type: Orion

Astrometry
Radial velocity (R_{v})	19.00 km/s
Proper motion (μ)	RA: −2.410 mas/yr Dec.: −2.912 mas/yr
Parallax (π)	1.5304±0.0273 mas
Distance	2,130 ± 40 ly (650 ± 10 pc)

Details
Mass	6.6 M_{☉}
Radius	6.63 R_{☉}
Luminosity	1,550 L_{☉}
Temperature	14,125 K
Rotational velocity (v sin i)	90 km/s
Age	0.32 Myr

Other designations
- MWC 147, V700 Monocerotis, BD+10°1172, HD 259431, HIP 31235, SAO 95823, TYC 737-610-1

Database references
SIMBAD	data

HD 259431 (MWC 147 or V700 Monocerotis) is a young stellar object in the constellation of Monoceros.

== Location ==
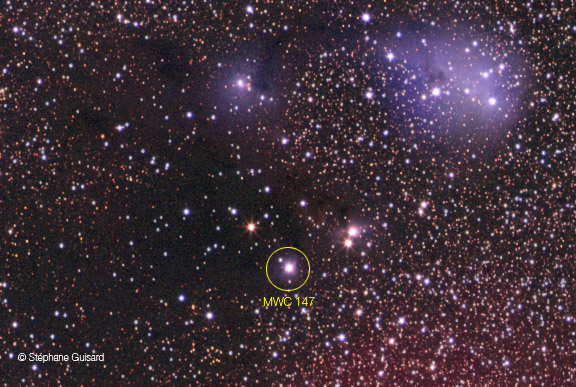
Close-up on MWC 147 (north is left)

HD 259431 lies in the northern portion of Monoceros, between Orion and Canis Minor, along with the spectacular Rosette Nebula and NGC 2264 region. It is half a degree from the faint IC 447 reflection nebula.

HD 259431 is seen against NGC 2247, a small reflection nebula and star-forming region. It has been considered to be the illuminating source for the nebula, although it is uncertain if they are at the same distance. The Hipparcos annual parallax gives a distance of 170 parsecs while NGC 2247 is thought to be at about 800 parsecs, although both distances are somewhat uncertain. Many of its properties have been calculated assuming a distance of 800 parsecs, which means they are also highly uncertain. Gaia Data Release 3 gives a statistically precise distance around 650 parsecs.

== Properties ==
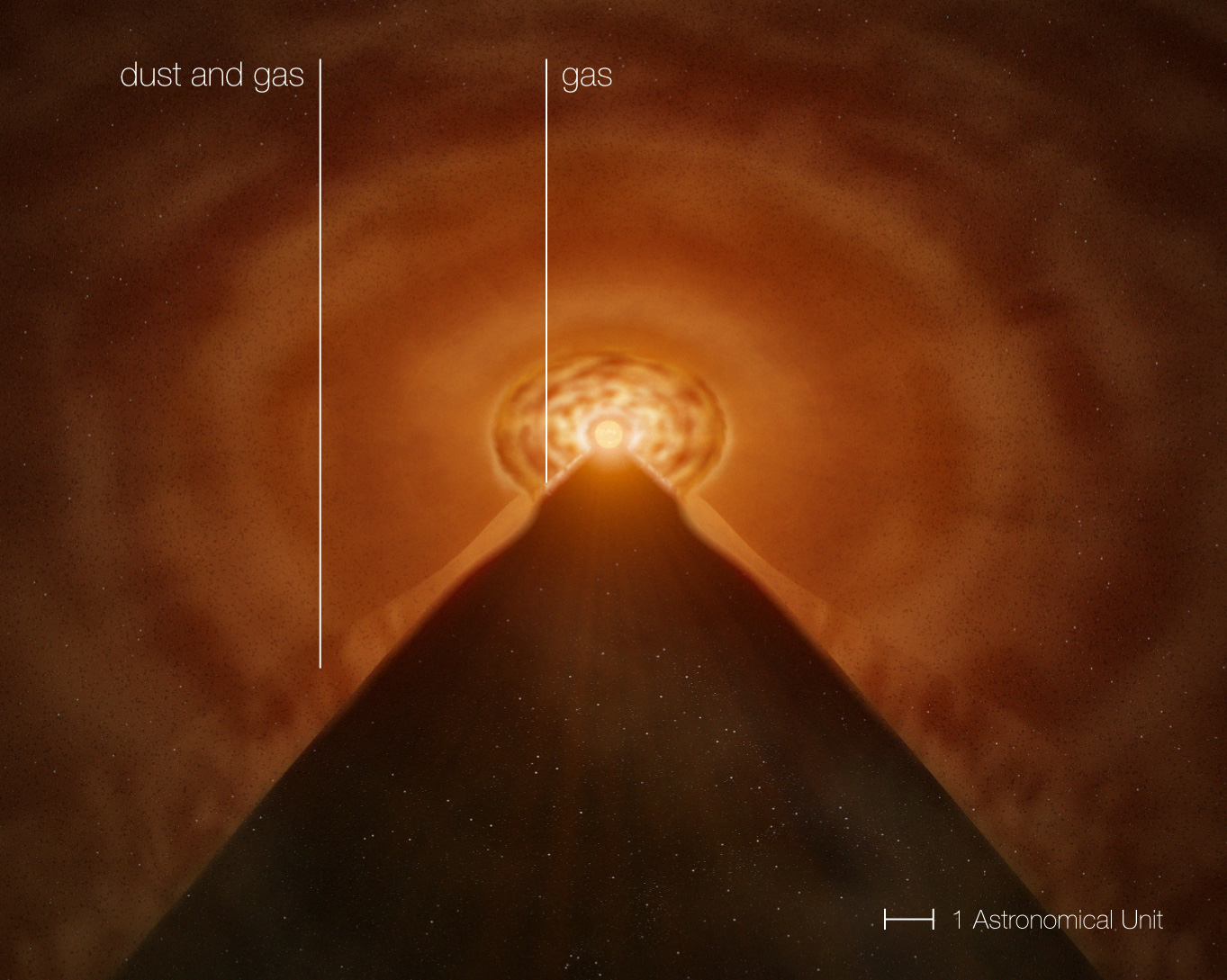
Illustration of cross-section of protoplanetary disk around MWC 147

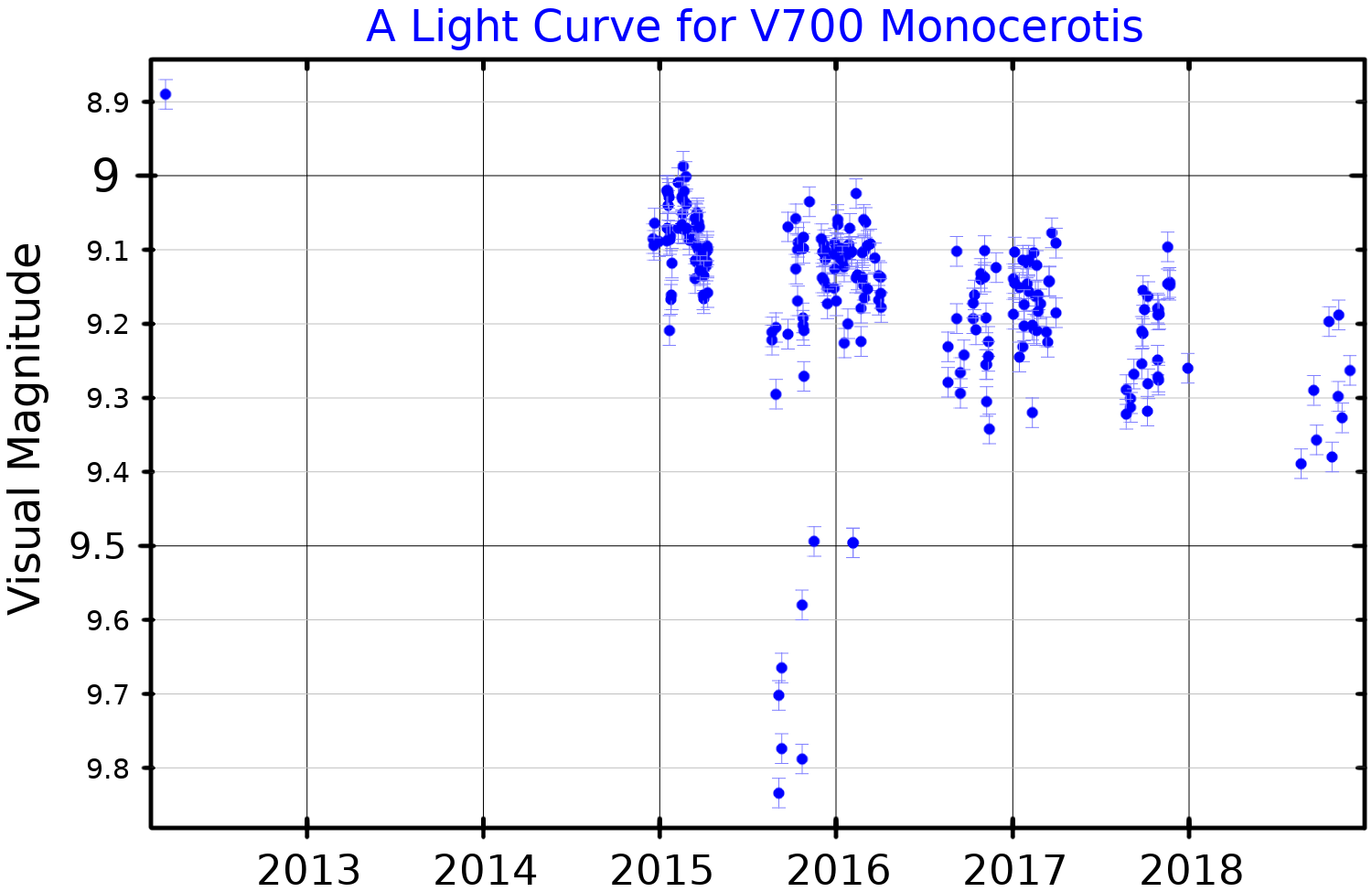
A visual band light curve for V700 Monocerotis, plotted from ASAS-SN data

HD 259431 is classed as a Herbig Haro Be star and has been instrumental in helping astronomers understand the formation of stars. A large star, with a large surrounding dust cloud, MWC 147 has given astronomers a clear picture of the mechanics of the accretion processes that form stars.

Star MWC 147 was observed in the near and mid-infrared. The near-infrared studies showed dust matter at a temperature of several thousand kelvins in the innermost regions of the protoplanetary disk. In the mid-IR were lower temperatures. These observations showed that the disk around the star disk extends over 100 AU.

The resulting research model assumes that the star increasing in mass at a rate 7×10^{−6} solar masses per year, or the equivalent of about two Earth masses per year. MWC has a mass of 6.6 M_{☉} and is younger than 500 000 years. This means that the life of this star is expected to be only about 35 million years.

The star is found in the night sky at RA 06 h 33 m 05.19 and Dec 10° 19' 19.9869". It has a temperature of 14 125 K and spectral type of B6ep. It is also known as 2MJ06330519 + 1019199, HD 259431, HIP 31235 and SAO 95823.
