= 20 Monocerotis =

Star in the constellation Monoceros

- Location of 20 Monocerotis (circled)

Observation data Epoch J2000 Equinox ICRS
- Constellation: Monoceros
- Right ascension: 07^{h} 10^{m} 13.68177^{s}
- Declination: −04° 14′ 13.5829″
- Apparent magnitude (V): 4.92

Characteristics
- Evolutionary stage: horizontal branch
- Spectral type: K0III
- U−B color index: +0.78
- B−V color index: +1.03

Astrometry
Radial velocity (R_{v})	+77.74 km/s
Proper motion (μ)	RA: −0.714 mas/yr Dec.: +217.298 mas/yr
Parallax (π)	16.8419±0.1692 mas
Distance	194 ± 2 ly (59.4 ± 0.6 pc)
Absolute magnitude (M_{V})	0.94

Details
Mass	1.07±0.20 M_{☉}
Radius	10.25±0.11 R_{☉}
Luminosity	46.36±0.56 L_{☉}
Surface gravity (log g)	2.53±0.10 cgs
Temperature	4,714±46 K
Metallicity [Fe/H]	−0.25±0.03 dex
Rotational velocity (v sin i)	2.33±0.50 km/s
Age	5.75±2.85 Gyr

Other designations
- 20 Mon, BD−04°1840, FK5 1186, GC 9477, HD 54810, HIP 34622, HR 2701, SAO 134282, CCDM J07102-0414A, WDS J07102-0414A

Database references
SIMBAD	data

20 Monocerotis is a single star located about 194 light years away from the Sun in the equatorial constellation of Monoceros. It is visible to the naked eye as a faint, orange-hued star with an apparent visual magnitude of 4.92. The star is receding from the Earth with a heliocentric radial velocity of +78 km/s.

This object is an aging giant star with a stellar classification of K0 III. It is a red clump giant, which indicates it is on the horizontal branch and is generating energy through helium fusion at its core. The star is around six billion years old with 1.1 times the mass of the Sun. After exhausting the supply of hydrogen at its core, it has expanded to 10.3 times the Sun's radius. It is radiating 46 times the luminosity of the Sun from its swollen photosphere at an effective temperature of 4,714 K.

In addition to the primary, three visual companions have been reported: component B, with magnitude 12.93 and separation 67.8", C, with magnitude 10.16 and separation 167.9", and D, with magnitude 12.46 and separation 102.3".
