= Zeta Monocerotis =

Yellow-white hued star in the constellation Monoceros

ζ Monocerotis
- Location of ζ Monocerotis (circled in red)

Observation data Epoch J2000 Equinox J2000
- Constellation: Monoceros
- Right ascension: 08^{h} 08^{m} 35.64663^{s}
- Declination: −02° 59′ 01.6361″
- Apparent magnitude (V): 4.33

Characteristics
- Spectral type: G2Ib
- U−B color index: +0.72
- B−V color index: +0.97

Astrometry
Radial velocity (R_{v})	+29.8±0.3 km/s
Proper motion (μ)	RA: −18.81 mas/yr Dec.: −4.50 mas/yr
Parallax (π)	3.08±0.27 mas
Distance	1,060 ± 90 ly (320 ± 30 pc)
Absolute magnitude (M_{V})	−3.18

Details
Mass	6.2 M_{☉}
Luminosity	2,207 L_{☉}
Surface gravity (log g)	1.75 cgs
Temperature	5,289 K
Metallicity [Fe/H]	+0.01 dex
Rotational velocity (v sin i)	17 km/s

Other designations
- ζ Mon, 29 Monocerotis, BD−02°2450, GC 11051, HD 67594, HIP 39863, HR 3188, SAO 135551, CCDM J08086-0259A, WDS J08086-0259A

Database references
SIMBAD	data

Zeta Monocerotis, Latinized from ζ Monocerotis, is a single, yellow-hued star in the constellation Monoceros. It has an apparent visual magnitude of 4.33, which is bright enough to be visible to the naked eye. The annual parallax shift as measured during the Hipparcos mission is 3.08 milliarcseconds, which provides a rough distance estimate of 1,060 light years. It is moving away from the Sun with a radial velocity of +30 km/s.

This star has a stellar classification of G2 Ib, which matches a supergiant of type G. It has an estimated 6.2 times the mass of the Sun and is radiating 2,207 times the Sun's luminosity from its photosphere at an effective temperature of 5,289 K. Zeta Monocerotis has three visual companions: component B, with separation 33.3" and magnitude 10.32, C, with separation 65.1" and magnitude 9.68, and D, with separation 38.1" and magnitude 13.4.
