= HD 57682 =

- Location of HD 57682 (circled in red)

Observation data Epoch J2000.0 Equinox J2000.0
- Constellation: Monoceros
- Right ascension: 07^{h} 22^{m} 2.05^{s}
- Declination: −08° 58′ 45.8″
- Apparent magnitude (V): 6.42

Characteristics
- Evolutionary stage: main sequence
- Spectral type: O9.2IV

Astrometry
Radial velocity (R_{v})	+24.1 km/s
Proper motion (μ)	RA: +9.659 mas/yr Dec.: +13.159 mas/yr
Parallax (π)	0.8968±0.0739 mas
Distance	3,600 ± 300 ly (1,120 ± 90 pc)
Absolute magnitude (M_{V})	−4.4

Details
Mass	17+19 −9 M_{☉}
Radius	7.0+2.4 −1.8 R_{☉}
Luminosity	79,433 L_{☉}
Surface gravity (log g)	3.93 cgs
Temperature	33,500 K
Rotation	~63.5 days
Rotational velocity (v sin i)	10 km/s
Age	4.5 Myr

Other designations
- MCW 529, HD 57682, HIP 35707, HR 2806, SAO 134580, TIC 187458882, TYC 5395-4693-1, IRAS 07196-0852, 2MASS J07220205-0858457

Database references
SIMBAD	data

HD 57682 is a rare magnetic massive O-type main-sequence star star located in the constellation of Monoceros. It is one of only a small number of confirmed magnetic O-type stars and is notable for its strong dipolar magnetic field, which confines its stellar wind and produces observable spectroscopic variability.

== Discovery and Observation ==
The magnetic field was first reported in 2009, making HD 57682 one of the few known magnetic O-type stars at the time (fewer than 10 confirmed). Follow-up studies in 2012) refined the rotational period, magnetic geometry, and magnetospheric properties. The star's sharp spectral lines and low rotation make it an ideal target for studying magnetism in massive stars.

HD 57682 hosts a strong, organized dipolar magnetic field, discovered in 2009 as part of the Magnetism in Massive Stars (MiMeS) survey using spectropolarimetric observations with the ESPaDOnS instrument at the Canada-France-Hawaii Telescope. The surface polar strength of the dipole is estimated at approximately 880–1,680 G, with later refinements favoring lower values around 880 G and a high obliquity angle (~79°). It exhibits a weak stellar wind with a mass-loss rate of ~1.4×10^{−9} M_{☉}/yr. The star is a runaway star, moving at high velocity away from its likely birthplace in the Canis Major OB1 association.
