= HD 48099 =

Binary star system in the constellation Monoceros

- Location of JD 48099 (circled)

Observation data Epoch J2000 Equinox ICRS
- Constellation: Monoceros
- Right ascension: 06^{h} 41^{m} 59.2309^{s}
- Declination: +06° 20′ 43.531″
- Apparent magnitude (V): 6.37

Characteristics
- Spectral type: O5.5V((f)) + O9V
- U−B color index: −0.94
- B−V color index: −0.05

Astrometry
Radial velocity (R_{v})	+1.30 km/s
Proper motion (μ)	RA: 0.84 mas/yr Dec.: 2.55 mas/yr
Parallax (π)	1.17±0.41 mas
Distance	1829 pc
Absolute magnitude (M_{V})	−5.6

Orbit
Period (P)	3.0786 days
Semi-major axis (a)	~33 R_{☉}
Eccentricity (e)	0.0
Inclination (i)	16°
Semi-amplitude (K_{1}) (primary)	54.4 km/s
Semi-amplitude (K_{2}) (secondary)	96.2 km/s

Details
Mass	55 M_{☉}
Radius	11.6 R_{☉}
Luminosity	450,000 L_{☉}
Surface gravity (log g)	4.5 cgs
Temperature	44,000 K
Rotational velocity (v sin i)	330 km/s

secondary
Mass	19 M_{☉}
Radius	6.5 R_{☉}
Luminosity	40,000 L_{☉}
Surface gravity (log g)	3.5 cgs
Temperature	32,000 K
Rotational velocity (v sin i)	185 km/s

Other designations
- HR 2467, HD 48099, HIP 32067, SAO 114293, BD+06°1351

Database references
SIMBAD	data

HD 48099 is a spectroscopic binary in the constellation Monoceros where both components are massive and luminous O stars.

Binary stars offer the opportunity to directly measure the mass of each component, but in the case the orbital inclination is very low and the masses cannot be accurately determined. The stars are orbiting extremely close together, separated only by about the diameters of the stars themselves. They complete one orbit in just over three days.

Although HD 48099 only has a moderate space velocity of 37.7 km/s, it has produced a bow shock 2.26 parsecs from the star itself.
