= BT Monocerotis =

Nova seen in 1939

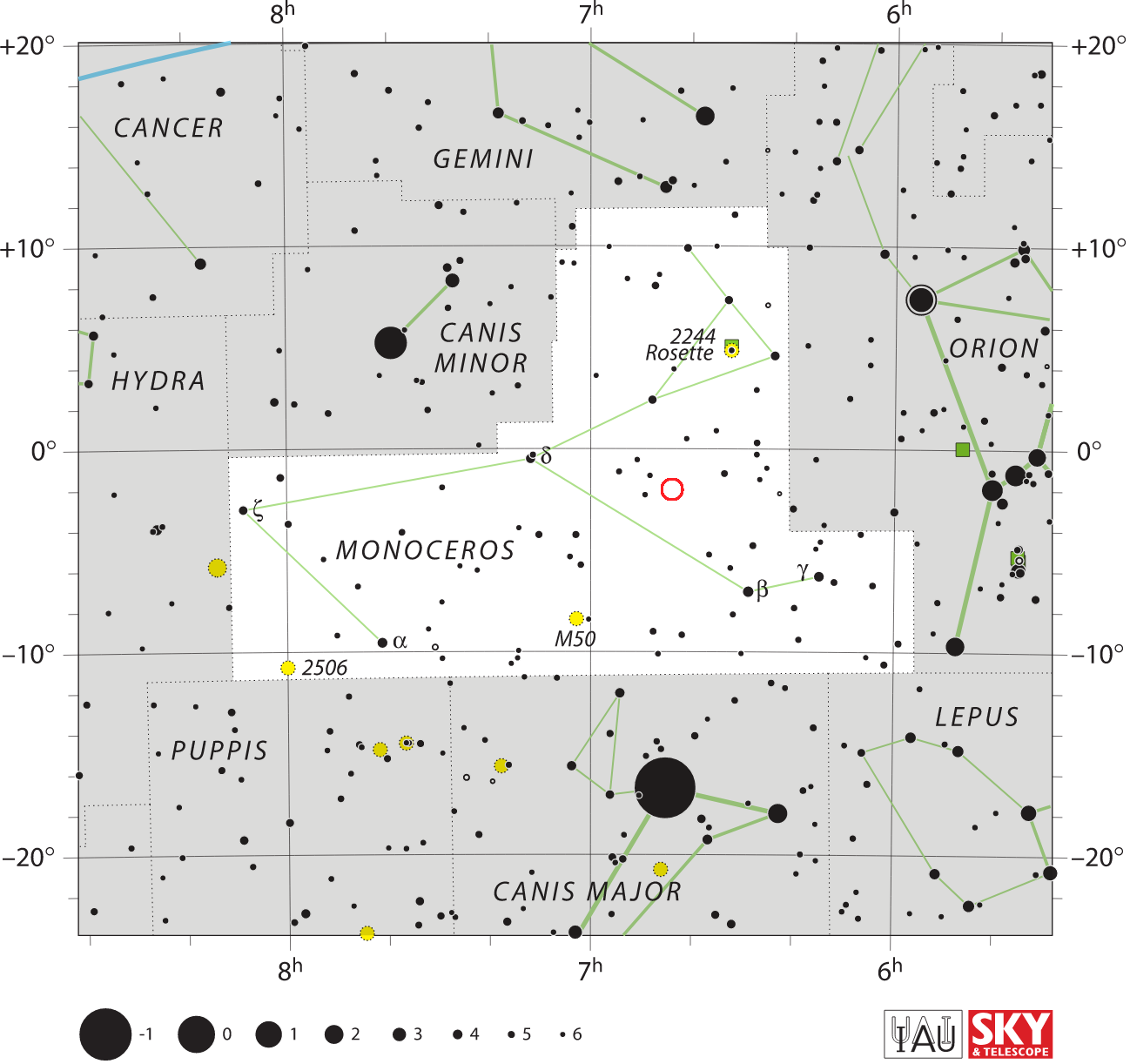
- Location of BT Monocerotis (circled in red)

Observation data Epoch J2000 Equinox J2000
- Constellation: Monoceros
- Right ascension: 06^{h} 43^{m} 47.242^{s}
- Declination: −02° 01′ 13.88″
- Apparent magnitude (V): 4.5 – 15.8

Characteristics
- Spectral type: D/G8V
- Variable type: Eclipsing binary

Astrometry
Distance	1,413 ± 97 pc

Details
Mass	1.04/0.87 M_{☉}
Rotational velocity (v sin i)	—/138 km/s

Other designations
- BT Mon, Nova Monocerotis 1939, 2MASS J06434723-0201139, AAVSO 0638-01, Gaia DR2 3106991818813980416

Database references
SIMBAD	data

BT Monocerotis (Nova Monocerotis 1939) was a nova, which lit up in the constellation Monoceros in 1939. It was discovered on a spectral plate by Fred L. Whipple on December 23, 1939. BT Monocerotis is believed to have reached mag 4.5, which would have made it visible to the naked eye, but that value is an extrapolation; the nova was not observed at peak brightness Its brightness decreased after the outbreak by 3 magnitudes in 182 days, making it a "slow nova". The light curve for the eruption had a long plateau period.

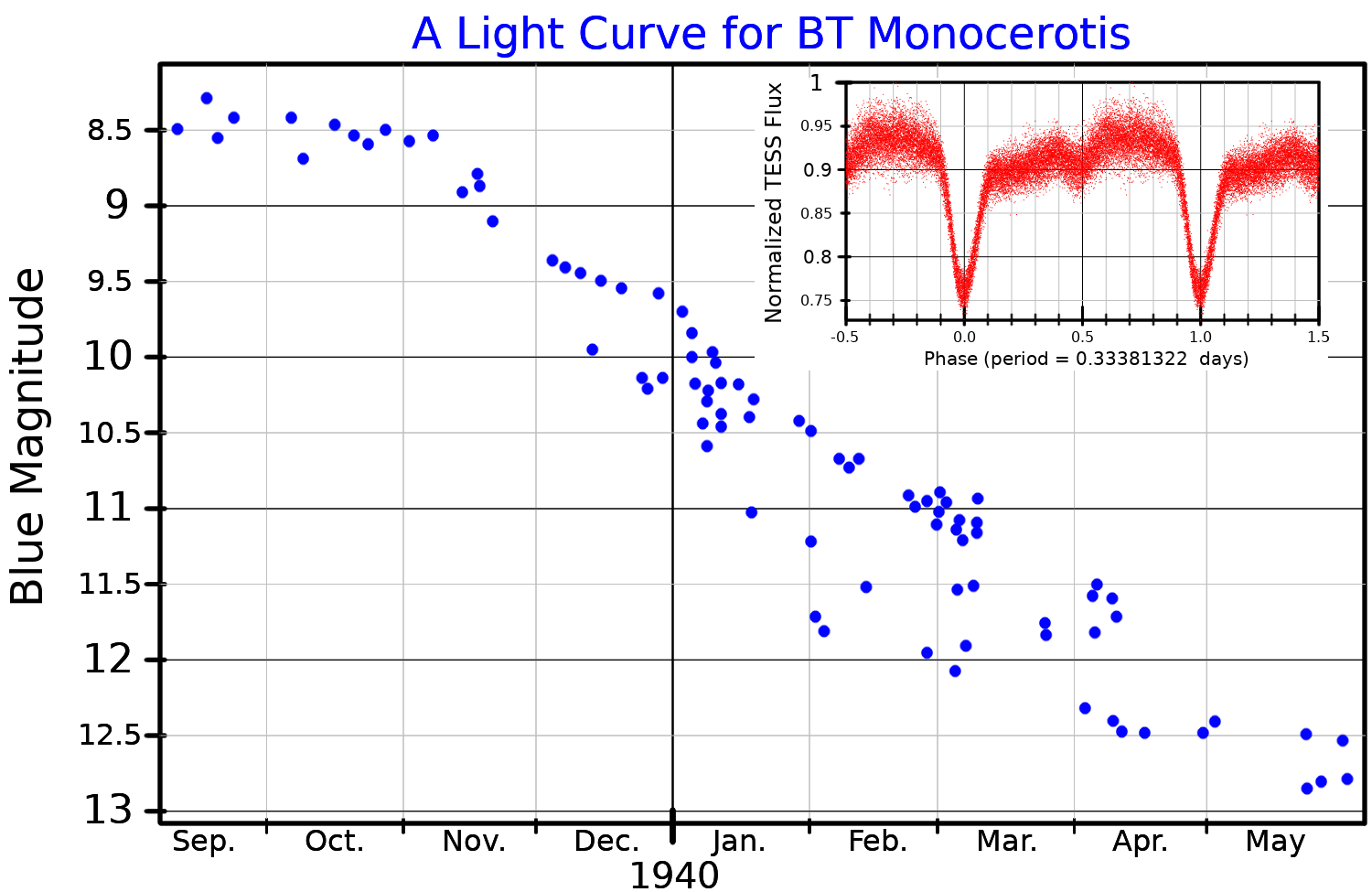
Light curves for BT Monocerotis. The main plot, adapted from Schaefer and Patterson (1983), shows the decline from the 1939 nova eruption, and the inset plot, from TESS data, shows the post-eruption brightness fluctuations during an orbital period.

Photographic plates taken for 30 years prior to the eruption show that BT Monocerotis remained visible during that period. Prior to 1933, BT Monocerotis had an average magnitude of 15.52 with a variation of 1.2 magnitudes. It retained the same magnitude until the eruption, showing a variation of 0.9 magnitudes. Thus it did not show a pre-eruption rise in brightness.

This is an interacting binary star system consisting of a 1.04±0.06M_{☉} white dwarf primary star and a 0.87±0.06M_{☉} main sequence star with a stellar classification of G8V. The orbit has a period of 0.33381379 days and an inclination of 88.2° to the line of sight to the Earth, resulting in an eclipsing binary. The nova eruption is believed to have been driven by mass transferred from the secondary star to the white dwarf. It remains uncertain whether the white dwarf has an accretion disk formed by this material. Matter outflowing from the system has a line of sight velocity of 450 km s^{−1}, but may be moving at up to 3,200 km s^{−1} if the flow is strictly bipolar.
