= 28 Monocerotis =

Star in the constellation Monoceros

- Location of 28 Monocerotis (circled in red)

Observation data Epoch J2000 Equinox ICRS
- Constellation: Monoceros
- Right ascension: 08^{h} 01^{m} 13.33574^{s}
- Declination: −01° 23′ 33.3935″
- Apparent magnitude (V): 4.69

Characteristics
- Spectral type: K4III
- U−B color index: +1.76
- B−V color index: +1.49

Astrometry
| Radial velocity (R_{v}) | +26.70 km/s |
| Proper motion (μ) | RA: +67.60 mas/yr Dec.: −76.26 mas/yr |
| Parallax (π) | 7.25±0.30 mas |
| Distance | 450 ± 20 ly (138 ± 6 pc) |
| Absolute magnitude (M_{V}) | −1.00 |

Details
| Mass | 2.193±0.110 M_{☉} |
| Radius | 47.69+0.46 −2.21 R_{☉} |
| Luminosity | 524±42 L_{☉} |
| Surface gravity (log g) | 1.68 cgs |
| Temperature | 3,999+96 −19 K |
| Metallicity [Fe/H] | −0.26 dex |
| Rotational velocity (v sin i) | 2.2 km/s |

Other designations
- V645 Mon, BD−00 1882, FK5 2620, GC 10870, HD 65953, HIP 39211, HR 3141, SAO 135380

Database references
| SIMBAD | data |

28 Monocerotis is a single star in the equatorial constellation of Monoceros. It has an orange-hue and is faintly visible to the naked eye with an apparent visual magnitude of 4.69. The distance to this star is approximately 450 light years based on parallax, and it has an absolute magnitude of −1.00. The star is drifting further away from the Sun with a radial velocity of +26.7 km/s.

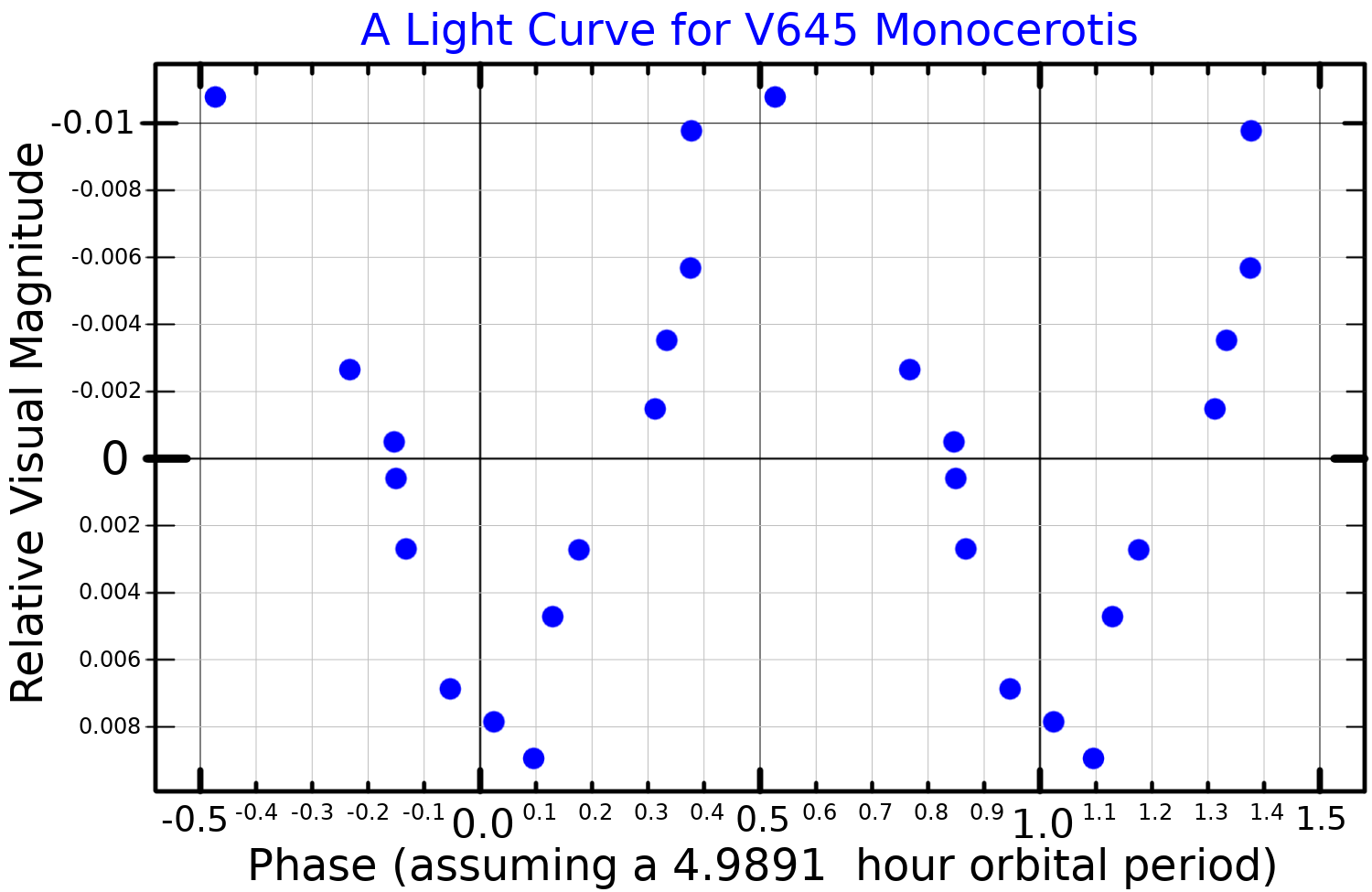
A visual band light curve for V645 Monocerotis, adapted from Stift (1979)

This is an aging giant star with a stellar classification of K4III, having exhausted the supply of hydrogen at its core then cooled and expanded off the main sequence. The spectrum of the star shows abnormally strong lines of CN. It is classified as an FK Comae Berenices variable, varying by 0.02 magnitude over a period of 0.21 days. FK Comae Berenices variables are typically rapidly-rotating stars, but the measured projected rotational velocity of 28 Monocerotis is low. The star has expanded to 48 times the radius of the Sun. It is radiating 524 times the Sun's luminosity from its enlarged photosphere at an effective temperature of 3,999 K.

Measurement of the star's proper motion anomaly by the Gaia spacecraft suggests a companion may be orbiting the star at a distance of 1.9 AU.
