= 27 Monocerotis =

Star in the constellation Monoceros

- Location of 27 Monocerotis (circled in red)

Observation data Epoch J2000 Equinox ICRS
- Constellation: Monoceros
- Right ascension: 07^{h} 59^{m} 44.15308^{s}
- Declination: −03° 40′ 46.5065″
- Apparent magnitude (V): 4.93

Characteristics
- Spectral type: K2III
- U−B color index: +1.21
- B−V color index: +1.21

Astrometry
Radial velocity (R_{v})	−28.02 km/s
Proper motion (μ)	RA: −54.379 mas/yr Dec.: −3.132 mas/yr
Parallax (π)	10.2424±0.1791 mas
Distance	318 ± 6 ly (98 ± 2 pc)
Absolute magnitude (M_{V})	0.30

Details
Mass	1.28±0.20 M_{☉}
Radius	13.41±1.11 R_{☉}
Luminosity	148.283 L_{☉}
Surface gravity (log g)	2.40±0.04 cgs
Temperature	4,568±12 K
Metallicity [Fe/H]	−0.25±0.03 dex
Rotational velocity (v sin i)	1.76±0.56 km/s
Age	3.87±1.86 Gyr

Other designations
- 27 Mon, BD−03°2157, FK5 304, GC 10811, HD 65695, HIP 39079, HR 3122, SAO 135345

Database references
SIMBAD	data

27 Monocerotis is a single star located about 318 light years away from the Sun star in the equatorial constellation of Monoceros. It is visible to the naked eye as a faint, orange-hued star with an apparent visual magnitude of 4.93. The star is advancing toward the Earth with a heliocentric radial velocity of −28 km/s.

This object is an aging giant star, most likely (94% chance) on the red giant branch, with a stellar classification of K2III. Having exhausted the hydrogen at its core, the star has evolved off the main sequence and expanded to over 13 times the girth of the Sun. It is around four billion years old with 1.3 times the Sun's mass. The star is radiating 148 times the Sun's luminosity from its swollen photosphere at an effective temperature of 4,568 K.
