= HD 50281 =

Binary star in the constellation Monoceros

Observation data Epoch J2000 Equinox J2000
- Constellation: Monoceros
- Right ascension: 06^{h} 52^{m} 18.05045^{s}
- Declination: −05° 10′ 25.3662″
- Apparent magnitude (V): 6.58

Characteristics
- Evolutionary stage: main sequence
- Spectral type: K3.5 V
- B−V color index: 1.071±0.008

Astrometry
Radial velocity (R_{v})	−7.20±0.15 km/s
Proper motion (μ)	RA: −543.616 mas/yr Dec.: −3.491 mas/yr
Parallax (π)	114.2968±0.0465 mas
Distance	28.54 ± 0.01 ly (8.749 ± 0.004 pc)
Absolute magnitude (M_{V})	6.87

Details
Mass	0.79 M_{☉}
Radius	0.73+0.01 −0.02 R_{☉}
Luminosity	0.225 L_{☉}
Surface gravity (log g)	4.64 cgs
Temperature	4,712±8.5 K
Metallicity [Fe/H]	+0.01 dex
Rotational velocity (v sin i)	5.5 km/s
Age	1.88 Gyr

Other designations
- 88 G. Monocerotis, BD−05°1844, GJ 250, HD 50281, HIP 32984, HR 2534, SAO 133805, WDS J06523−0510, LFT 494, LHS 1875, LTT 2662

Database references
SIMBAD	A
- B

HD 50281 is a star in the equatorial constellation of Monoceros. It is orange in hue with an apparent visual magnitude of 6.58, which lies at or below the typical limit of visibility to the naked eye. The star is located at a distance of 28.5 light years from the Sun based on parallax, but is drifting closer with a radial velocity of −7.2 km/s.

This object is an ordinary K-type main-sequence star with a stellar classification of K3.5 V. It is nearly two billion years old and is spinning with a projected rotational velocity of 5.5 km/s. The metallicity of this star – what astronomers term the abundance of elements with atomic numbers greater than helium – is near solar. The star has 79% of the mass of the Sun and 73% of the Sun's radius. It is radiating 22.5% of the luminosity of the Sun from its photosphere at an effective temperature of 4,712 K.

A magnitude 10.16 common proper motion companion, designated component B, is located at an angular separation of 58.8″ along a position angle of 181° from the primary, as of 2015. This is a suspected binary star system with components of individual visual magnitude 10.6 and 11.1, and a class of M2.5 V. The coordinates of this companion are a source of X-ray emission. A third companion, magnitude 14.04 component C, lies at a separation of 9.6″ from component B.

== See also ==
- List of nearest K-type stars
