= V723 Monocerotis =

Variable star in Monoceros

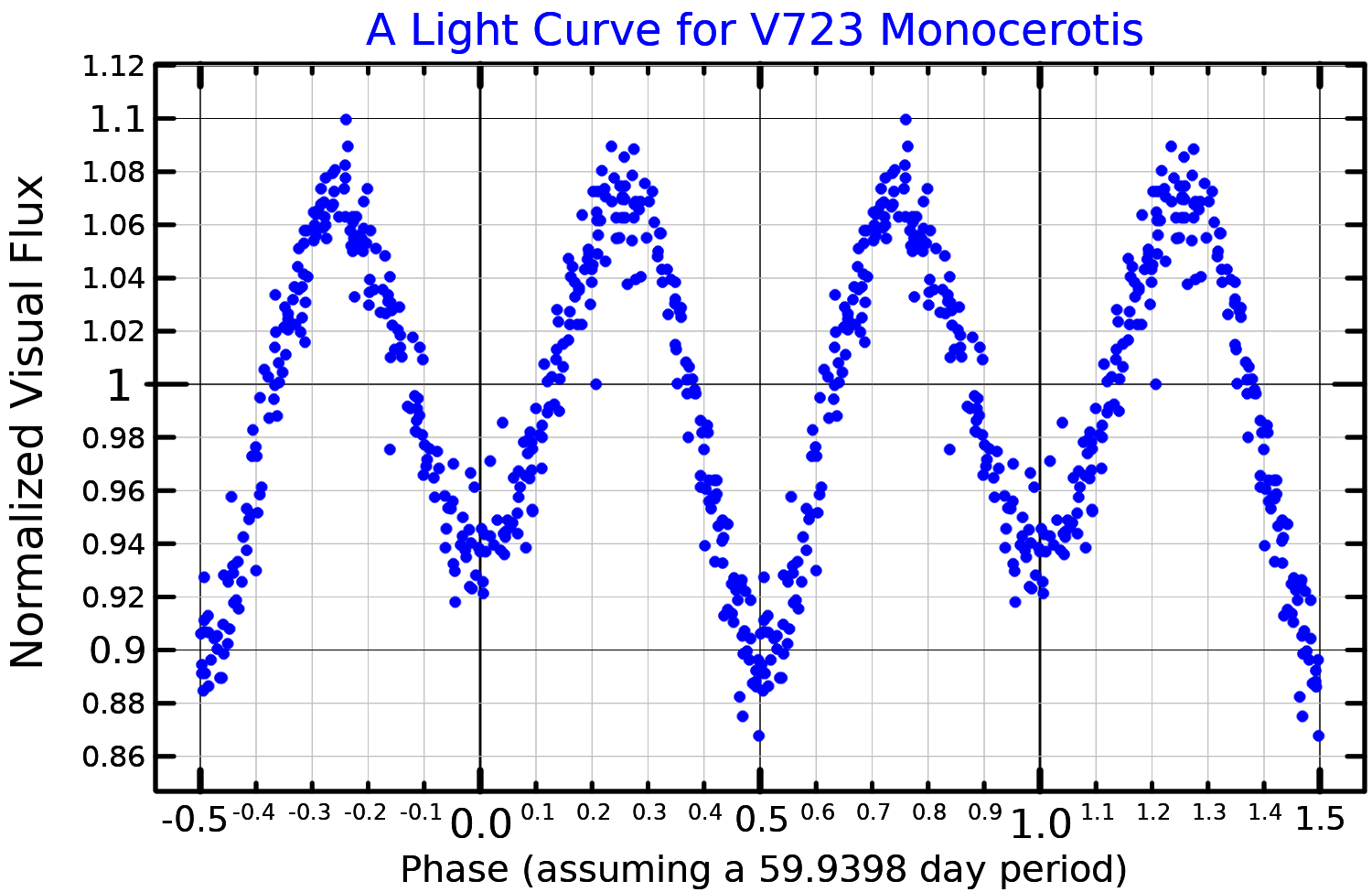
- A visual band light curve for V723 Monocerotis, adapted from Jayasinghe et al. (2021)

Observation data Epoch J2000.0 Equinox ICRS
- Constellation: Monoceros
- Right ascension: 06^{h} 29^{m} 04.659^{s}
- Declination: −05° 34′ 20.23″
- Apparent magnitude (V): 8.21 - 8.42

Characteristics
- Spectral type: G0II
- Variable type: Ellipsoidal

Astrometry
Proper motion (μ)	RA: −1.347 mas/yr Dec.: 16.140 mas/yr
Parallax (π)	2.1748±0.0331 mas
Distance	1,500 ± 20 ly (460 ± 7 pc)
Absolute magnitude (M_{V})	+0.93

Orbit
Period (P)	59.9398 d
Eccentricity (e)	0 (fixed)
Inclination (i)	87.0+1.7 −1.4°
Argument of periastron (ω) (secondary)	0 (fixed)°

Details

Stripped giant star
Mass	0.44±0.06 M_{☉}
Radius	22.5±1.0 R_{☉}
Luminosity	105 L_{☉}
Surface gravity (log g)	1.3 cgs
Temperature	3,800±100 K
Metallicity [Fe/H]	−0.5 dex
Rotational velocity (v sin i)	15±2 km/s
Age	5.4+5.1 −2.6 Gyr

Subgiant
Mass	2.8±0.3 M_{☉}
Radius	8.3±0.4 R_{☉}
Luminosity	70 L_{☉}
Surface gravity (log g)	~3 cgs
Temperature	5,800±200 K
Metallicity [Fe/H]	−0.5 dex
Rotational velocity (v sin i)	70±10 km/s

Other designations
- V723 Mon, BD−05 1649, HD 45762, HIP 30891, SAO 133321, PPM 189220

Database references
SIMBAD	data

V723 Monocerotis is a binary star in the constellation Monoceros. It is an ellipsoidal variable about 1,500 light-years distant, too faint to be seen to the naked eye, with a variable apparent magnitude between 8.21 and 8.42.

It was proposed in 2021 to be a binary system including a lower mass gap black hole candidate nicknamed "The Unicorn". Located 1,500 light years from Earth, it would be the closest known black hole, and among the smallest ever found with a mass 3 times the mass of the Sun, corresponding to a Schwarzschild radius of 9 kilometers.

Follow-up work in 2022 argued that V723 Monocerotis does not contain a black hole, but is a mass-transfer binary containing a red giant that has been stripped of much of its mass, and a subgiant star. The primary red giant star has 25 times the Sun's radius but an unusually low mass of 0.44 solar masses due to mass transfer to its partner. The secondary star is 2.8 times more massive than the Sun and 8.3 times larger, a subgiant approaching the base of the red giant branch. The primary is more than a 100 times as luminous as the Sun, while the secondary is about 70 times as luminous.
