= Gliese 282 =

Star in the constellation Monoceros

Observation data Epoch J2000 Equinox 2000
- Constellation: Monoceros
- Right ascension: 07^{h} 39^{m} 59.329^{s}
- Declination: −03° 35′ 51.03″
- Apparent magnitude (V): 7.30 + 9.01 + 9.87

Characteristics
- Spectral type: K2V + K7V + M1.5Ve
- Variable type: A: BY Dra

Astrometry

A
Radial velocity (R_{v})	−18.40±0.14 km/s
Proper motion (μ)	RA: +70.078 mas/yr Dec.: −278.117 mas/yr
Parallax (π)	71.0323±0.0243 mas
Distance	45.92 ± 0.02 ly (14.078 ± 0.005 pc)
Absolute magnitude (M_{V})	+6.42

Orbit
Primary	Ca
Secondary	Cb
Period (P)	18.254+0.116 −0.117 yr
Eccentricity (e)	0.227±0.001
Inclination (i)	93.137+0.087 −0.086°
Longitude of the node (Ω)	136.616+0.165 −0.167°
Argument of periastron (ω) (secondary)	181.395+0.738 −0.736°

Details

Gl 282 A
Radius	0.78 R_{☉}
Luminosity	0.29 L_{☉}
Surface gravity (log g)	4.40 cgs
Temperature	4,956 K
Metallicity [Fe/H]	−0.12 dex
Rotational velocity (v sin i)	1.77 km/s
Age	300−350 Myr

Gl 282 B
Mass	0.64 M_{☉}
Radius	0.73 R_{☉}
Luminosity	0.11 L_{☉}
Surface gravity (log g)	4.47 cgs
Temperature	3,874 K
Metallicity [Fe/H]	−0.25 dex
Age	680−720 Myr

Gl 282 Ca
Mass	0.539+0.008 −0.007 M_{☉}
Radius	0.51±0.05 R_{☉}
Luminosity	0.044±0.01 L_{☉}
Rotation	12.2±0.1 days
Age	740±100 Myr

Gl 282 Cb
Mass	0.185±0.001 M_{☉}

Other designations
- Gl 282, HD 61606, HIP 37349, WDS J07400-0336, 2MASS J07395932-0335506, V869 Mon
- Gl 282 A: BD−03°2001, SAO 134954
- Gl 282 B: BD−03°2002, SAO 134958
- Gl 282 C: G 112-29, NLTT 18149

Database references
SIMBAD	AB
- A
- B
- C
ARICNS	A
- B
- C

Gliese 282 is a star system composed of four stars in the equatorial constellation of Monoceros. At a distance of 46 light years, this star has an apparent magnitude of 7.26 when viewed from Earth. It is not visible to the naked eye.

The Gl 282AB star system is composed of two K- type main-sequence stars. The primary component, Gliese 282A, is a BY Draconis type variable star with a stellar classification of K2V. It has an effective temperature of 4,956 K. The companion, Gliese 282B, is a smaller, class K5V star. As of 2003, the pair had an angular separation of 58.30 arc seconds along a position angle of 113°. This is equivalent to a projected physical separation of 824 AU.

There is a distant common proper motion companion (G 112-29) at an angular separation of 1.09°. At the estimated distance of Gl 282AB, this corresponds to a projected separation of 55,733 AU (0.88128 light-years), making it one of the widest known physical companions. Initially believed to be a red dwarf star with a stellar classification of M1.5Ve, it turned out to be a pair of red dwarfs (Ca and Cb) with masses 0.55M_{☉} and 0.19M_{☉}, orbiting each other on 6591^{+136}_{−177} days orbit.
