= HD 50890 =

Red giant

- Location of HD 50890 (circled)

Observation data Epoch J2000.0 Equinox ICRS
- Constellation: Monoceros
- Right ascension: 06^{h} 54^{m} 58.91715^{s}
- Declination: −02° 48′ 12.9229″
- Apparent magnitude (V): 6.017

Characteristics
- Evolutionary stage: red giant branch
- Spectral type: K1III
- B−V color index: 1.095
- J−H color index: 0.650
- J−K color index: 0.715

Astrometry
Radial velocity (R_{v})	19.5 ± 2.0 km/s
Proper motion (μ)	RA: −5.225 mas/yr Dec.: −1.372 mas/yr
Parallax (π)	3.6718±0.0303 mas
Distance	888 ± 7 ly (272 ± 2 pc)

Details
Mass	5.6±1.7 M_{☉}
Radius	35.76±5.31 R_{☉}
Luminosity	517.8±17.5 L_{☉}
Surface gravity (log g)	1.85±0.26 cgs
Temperature	4730±95 K
Metallicity [Fe/H]	−0.02±0.13 dex
Rotational velocity (v sin i)	10±2 km/s
Age	165+20 −15 Myr

Other designations
- BD−02°1827, GC 9070, HD 50890, HIP 33243, HR 2582, SAO 133890, PPM 189689, TIC 282893379, TYC 4805-3804-1, GCRV 4527, GSC 04805-03804, IRAS 06524-0244, 2MASS J06545892-0248129

Database references
SIMBAD	data

HD 50890 is an orange-hued star in the constellation of Monoceros. With an apparent magnitude of 6.017, it is faintly visible to the naked eye under dark skies. As such, it is listed in the Bright Star Catalogue as HR 2582. It is located at a distance of 888 light-years (272 parsecs) according to Gaia DR3 parallax measurements, and is receding away from the Solar System at a heliocentric radial velocity of 19.5 km/s.

== Physical properties ==
This is an aging red giant whose spectral energy distribution best matches a spectral type of K1III, albeit previous studies gave it slightly differing types of G6III or K2III. It is about 5.6 times as massive as the Sun; these massive stars quickly pass through their final stages of evolution, thus only a few of them can be observed as red giants, making HD 50890 a rare such instance. The star has expanded to a radius of 35.76±5.31 R_{☉} and radiates 518 times the luminosity of the Sun from its inflated photosphere at an effective temperature of 4,730 K (4,460 °C; 8,050 °F). It rotates at a projected velocity of 10±2 km/s, unusually fast for a giant star. It has an age estimate of 165+20
−15 million years, at which several evolutionary stages are possible: it could be burning hydrogen in a shell around the core, which would imply an age of ~157 Myr; alternatively, it may be fusing helium at its core, placing the age at ~163 or ~180 Myr. The star exhibits solar-like oscillations at a frequency between 10 and 20 μHz.
