= MWC 560 =

Binary star in the constellation Monoceros

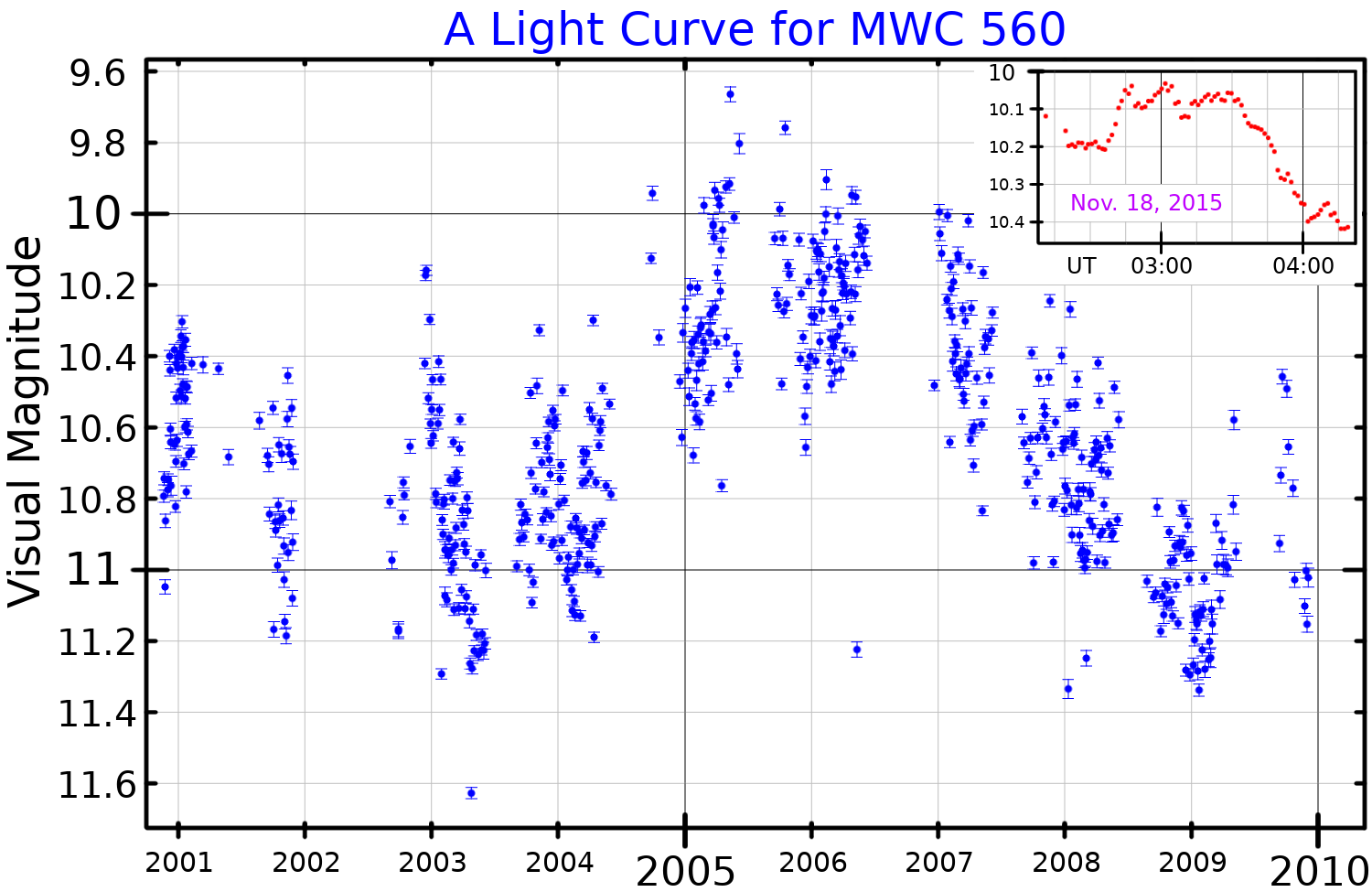
- A light curve for MWC 560. The main plot, displaying the ASAS-3 data, shows the long term variability, and the inset plot, adapted from Marchev et al., shows the intermittent short timescale flickering.

Observation data Epoch J2000.0 Equinox ICRS
- Constellation: Monoceros
- Right ascension: 07^{h} 25^{m} 51.284^{s}
- Declination: −07° 44′ 08.08″
- Apparent magnitude (V): 9.70 (9.1 to 10.1)

Characteristics
- Spectral type: M4ep + Beq
- B−V color index: 0.31

Astrometry
| Proper motion (μ) | RA: 2.067 mas/yr Dec.: 0.552 mas/yr |
| Parallax (π) | 0.424±0.0352 mas |
| Distance | 7,700 ± 600 ly (2,400 ± 200 pc) |

Details

M-type giant
| Mass | ~1 M_{☉} |

White dwarf
| Mass | 0.9 M_{☉} |
| Radius | 6,221 km |
| Luminosity | 200 to 3,000 L_{☉} |
| Temperature | 7,000–13,000 K |

Other designations
- MWC 560, V694 Mon, IRAS 07233-0737

Database references
| SIMBAD | data |

MWC 560 is a symbiotic binary star system in the equatorial constellation of Monoceros. The identifier comes from the Mount Wilson Calatogue of class O, B and A stars with bright hydrogen lines, published in 1933 by P. W. Merrill and associates. It has the variable star designation V694 Monoceros. This system has a typical apparent visual magnitude of 9.70, which is too dim to be visible to the naked eye. Based on parallax measurements, it is located at a distance of approximately 7,700 light years from the Sun.

== Observations ==
N. Sanduleak and C. B. Stephenson included this in a list of objects in the southern Milky Way with strong emission lines in 1973. They found bands of TiO in the spectrum and indicators of variable emission lines. A stellar classification of M4ep was found. In 1984, H. E. Bond and associates classified this as a symbiotic binary system consisting of an M-type giant star with an orbiting compact companion. The profiles of absorption lines show changes on a day to day basis. They theorized that matter is being transferred from the M–giant at a higher rate than the companion is able to accrete it, producing a flickering appearance.

In 1990, absorption lines were found to be coming from high velocity components, possibly from a jet-like ejecta nearly along the line of sight. The high velocity aspect was confirmed by the IUE during an outburst, which suggested the ejection of a cool, optically-thick shell from the compact object. Velocities of up to 6,000 km/s were recorded, and during the outburst the brightness increased from magnitude 12.5 up to as high as 9.2. Meanwhile the emission lines showed a stable radial velocity. The high rate of mass transfer inferred that an accretion disk is orbiting the compact object, with a thick envelop hiding the inner disk and compact object from direct sight. This disk is probably perpendicular to the line of sight from Earth, so it is being viewed nearly face-on.

Observation of the system over a ten year period demonstrated a light variation with a period of 1,930 days, which may be explained by precessing of the disk. The system shifted between active and stable states, with outflow much higher during the active stage. Meanwhile, infrared observations in the i band suggested that the M-giant may undergo pulsations with a period of around 5 months. In 2007, this was refined to a period of about 340 days, making this a semiregular variable probably consisting of a thermally pulsing asymptotic giant branch star. X-ray emission was detected from this system in 2009, with the data being consistent with an accreting white dwarf source. It is accreting mass at a rate of (1 to 20)×10^{−7} M_{☉}·yr^{−1}, with just a few percent of this rate being ejected in the jet.

The optical flickering persisted from 1984 until 2016. After a short pause it resumed until 2018, when it disappeared. At that point the system underwent steady brightness increase with periodicities of 331 and 1860 days. As of 2023, it remains in a non-flickering state, with maximum brightness achieved in October 2021.
