= HD 44219 =

Star in the constellation Monoceros

Observation data Epoch J2000 Equinox ICRS
- Constellation: Monoceros
- Right ascension: 06^{h} 20^{m} 14.32321^{s}
- Declination: −10° 43′ 30.0310″
- Apparent magnitude (V): 7.69

Characteristics
- Spectral type: G3V
- Apparent magnitude (B): 8.377
- Apparent magnitude (J): 6.509±0.029
- Apparent magnitude (H): 6.215±0.038
- Apparent magnitude (K): 6.115±0.017
- B−V color index: 0.687±0.007

Astrometry
| Radial velocity (R_{v}) | −12.17±0.25 km/s |
| Proper motion (μ) | RA: 72.349 mas/yr Dec.: −16.568 mas/yr |
| Parallax (π) | 18.8732±0.0638 mas |
| Distance | 172.8 ± 0.6 ly (53.0 ± 0.2 pc) |
| Absolute magnitude (M_{V}) | 4.18 |

Details
| Mass | 1.01±0.01 M_{☉} |
| Radius | 1.37±0.03 R_{☉} |
| Luminosity | 1.83±0.01 L_{☉} |
| Surface gravity (log g) | 4.17±0.02 cgs |
| Temperature | 5,749±45 K |
| Metallicity [Fe/H] | 0.04±0.01 dex |
| Rotational velocity (v sin i) | 1.524 km/s |
| Age | 5.40; 9.6±0.7 Gyr |

Other designations
- BD−10°1479, HD 44219, HIP 30114, SAO 151367, PPM 217031

Database references
| SIMBAD | data |
| Exoplanet Archive | data |

HD 44219 is a solar-type star with an exoplanetary companion in the equatorial constellation of Monoceros. It has an apparent visual magnitude of 7.69, making it an 8th magnitude star that is too faint to be readily visible to the naked eye. The system is located at a distance of 173 light-years from the Sun based on parallax measurements, but is drifting closer with a radial velocity of −12 km/s.

== Characteristics ==
This is an ordinary G-type main-sequence star with a stellar classification of G3V. L. Casagrande and associates in 2011 estimated the age of the star as 5.4 billion years, while A. Bonfanti and colleagues listed a much greater age of nearly 10 billion years in 2015. It has a near solar metallicity and is spinning with a projected rotational velocity of 1.5 km/s. The star has about the same mass as the Sun but is 37% larger in radius. It is radiating 1.83 times the luminosity of the Sun from its photosphere at an effective temperature of 5,749 K.

== Planetary system ==
In 2009, a Jovian planet was found in a highly eccentric orbit around the star by the HARPS planet search program. There is some evidence of an additional, longer-period companion.

The HD 44219 planetary system
| Companion (in order from star) | Mass | Semimajor axis (AU) | Orbital period (days) | Eccentricity | Inclination (°) | Radius |
|---|---|---|---|---|---|---|
| b | ≥ 0.58+0.06 −0.04 M_{J} | 1.19±0.02 | 472.3+6.3 −5.0 | 0.61+0.07 −0.09 | — | — |

== See also ==
- List of extrasolar planets
