= 17 Monocerotis =

Star in the constellation Monoceros

- Location of 17 Monocerotis (circled)

Observation data Epoch J2000 Equinox ICRS
- Constellation: Monoceros
- Right ascension: 06^{h} 47^{m} 19.82946^{s}
- Declination: +08° 02′ 14.1239″
- Apparent magnitude (V): 4.77

Characteristics
- Spectral type: K4 III
- U−B color index: +1.65
- B−V color index: +1.40

Astrometry
Radial velocity (R_{v})	+46.19 km/s
Proper motion (μ)	RA: -23.728 mas/yr Dec.: -12.011 mas/yr
Parallax (π)	6.62±0.25 mas
Distance	490 ± 20 ly (151 ± 6 pc)
Absolute magnitude (M_{V})	-1.12

Details
Radius	25+1 −3 R_{☉}
Luminosity	538.2±23.8 L_{☉}
Surface gravity (log g)	1.86 cgs
Temperature	4,345 K
Metallicity [Fe/H]	+0.06 dex
Rotational velocity (v sin i)	2.5 km/s

Other designations
- 17 Mon, BD+08°1496, GC 8880, HD 49161, HIP 32533, HR 2503, SAO 114410

Database references
SIMBAD	data

17 Monocerotis is a single star located around 490 light years away from the Sun in the equatorial constellation of Monoceros. It is visible to the naked eye as a faint, orange-hued star with an apparent visual magnitude of 4.77. The star is moving away from the Earth with a heliocentric radial velocity of +46 km/s.

This is an aging giant star with a stellar classification of K4 III. As a consequence of having exhausted the supply of hydrogen at its core, the star has expanded to 25 times the radius of the Sun. It is radiating around 538 times the Sun's luminosity from its swollen photosphere at an effective temperature of 4,345 K.
