= 18 Monocerotis =

Star in the constellation Monoceros

- Location of 18 Monocerotis (circled red)

Observation data Epoch J2000 Equinox ICRS
- Constellation: Monoceros
- Right ascension: 06^{h} 47^{m} 51.64752^{s}
- Declination: +02° 24′ 43.7737″
- Apparent magnitude (V): 4.47

Characteristics
- Spectral type: K0+IIIaBa0.2
- U−B color index: +1.04
- B−V color index: +1.11

Astrometry
Radial velocity (R_{v})	+11.29 km/s
Proper motion (μ)	RA: -16.898 mas/yr Dec.: -16.229 mas/yr
Parallax (π)	8.0947±0.2385 mas
Distance	400 ± 10 ly (124 ± 4 pc)
Absolute magnitude (M_{V})	-0.78

Orbit
Primary	18 Monocerotis A
Name	18 Monocerotis B
Period (P)	1760.9±1.9 d
Semi-major axis (a)	6.63 mas
Eccentricity (e)	0.40±0.04
Inclination (i)	96.25°
Longitude of the node (Ω)	47.63°
Periastron epoch (T)	2441942.5
Argument of periastron (ω) (secondary)	172±6°

Details

18 Mon A
Radius	26.95+1.56 −0.81 R_{☉}
Luminosity	311.2±10.5 L_{☉}
Surface gravity (log g)	2.59 cgs
Temperature	4,750 K
Metallicity [Fe/H]	-0.03 dex
Rotational velocity (v sin i)	< 2.0 km/s

Other designations
- 18 Mon, BD+02°1397, FK5 258, GC 8892, HD 49293, HIP 32578, HR 2506, SAO 114428

Database references
SIMBAD	data

18 Monocerotis is a binary star system located about halfway from Orion's Belt to Procyon, in the equatorial constellation of Monoceros. It is visible to the naked eye as a faint, orange-hued star with an apparent visual magnitude of 4.47, and is positioned around 370 light years away from the Sun based on parallax. The system is receding from the Earth with a heliocentric radial velocity of +11 km/s.

It is reported as a single-lined spectroscopic binary with an orbital period of 1,760.9 days (4.8 years) and an eccentricity of 0.4. The visible component is an aging K-type giant star with a stellar classification of K0+IIIaBa0.2, showing a slight overabundance of barium. The spectrum displays strong violet lines of CN. With the supply of hydrogen at its core exhausted, this star has expanded to 27 times the radius of the Sun. It is radiating 311 times the luminosity of the Sun from its swollen photosphere at an effective temperature of 4,750 K.
