= 13 Monocerotis =

Star in the constellation Monoceros

- Location of 13 Monocerotis (circled red)

Observation data Epoch J2000 Equinox ICRS
- Constellation: Monoceros
- Right ascension: 06^{h} 32^{m} 54.22948^{s}
- Declination: 07° 19′ 58.6942″
- Apparent magnitude (V): 4.498

Characteristics
- Spectral type: A0 Ib
- U−B color index: −0.217
- B−V color index: +0.007
- Variable type: suspected

Astrometry
Radial velocity (R_{v})	+11.80 km/s
Proper motion (μ)	RA: -0.20 mas/yr Dec.: -3.48 mas/yr
Parallax (π)	0.83±0.46 mas
Distance	780 pc
Absolute magnitude (M_{V})	−4.80

Details
Mass	12.0 M_{☉}
Radius	38 ± 4 (Note: Applying the Stefan–Boltzmann law with a nominal solar effective temperature of 5,772 K: $$\sqrt{\biggl(\frac{5,772}{10.250}\biggr)^4 \cdot 10^{4.15}} = 38\ R_\odot$$.) R_{☉}
Luminosity	14,100+2,900 −2,400 L_{☉}
Surface gravity (log g)	2.15 cgs
Temperature	10,250±200 K
Metallicity [Fe/H]	−0.18 dex
Rotational velocity (v sin i)	0 km/s
Age	16 Myr

Other designations
- BD+07 1337, FK5 1174, GC 8506, HIP 31216, HR 2385, HD 46300, NSV 16904, SAO 114034

Database references
SIMBAD	data

13 Monocerotis (13 Mon) is a class A0 Ib (white supergiant) star in the constellation Monoceros. Its apparent magnitude is 4.5 and it is approximately 780 parsecs (2,500 ly) away.

13 Mon lies within the Monoceros OB1 Association, halfway between the Rosette Nebula and NGC 2264, at a distance of about 780 parsecs. It is surrounded by a small reflection nebula listed as Van den Bergh 81 (VdB 81).

13 Monocerotis has been used as a standard star for the A0 Ib spectral class.

Extended photometry of 13 Monocerotis from 1997 to 2000 shows irregular variation of up to 0.04 magnitudes and also a slight trend to become fainter over the period. All the bright A0 - A5 supergiants analysed using Hipparcos satellite data were found to be variable, but 13 Mon was the least variable.
