= Delta Monocerotis =

Star in the constellation Monoceros

- Location of δ Monocerotis (circled)

Observation data Epoch J2000 Equinox ICRS
- Constellation: Monoceros
- Right ascension: 07^{h} 11^{m} 51.860^{s}
- Declination: −00° 29′ 33.96″
- Apparent magnitude (V): 4.15

Characteristics
- Spectral type: A2V or A0IV
- U−B color index: +0.04
- B−V color index: +0.00

Astrometry
Radial velocity (R_{v})	+15.0±4.1 km/s
Proper motion (μ)	RA: +0.79 mas/yr Dec.: +4.52 mas/yr
Parallax (π)	8.49±0.17 mas
Distance	384 ± 8 ly (118 ± 2 pc)
Absolute magnitude (M_{V})	−1.20

Details
Mass	2.4+0.43 −0.38 M_{☉}
Luminosity	350 L_{☉}
Surface gravity (log g)	3.5±0.25 cgs
Temperature	9,462 K
Metallicity [Fe/H]	0.00 dex
Rotational velocity (v sin i)	175.5±1.3 km/s
Age	405+135 −207 Myr

Other designations
- δ Mon, 22 Monocerotis, BD−00°1636, FK5 1187, GC 9518, HD 55185, HIP 34769, HR 2714, SAO 134330, CCDM J07119-0030A, WDS J07119-0030A

Database references
SIMBAD	data

Delta Monocerotis, which is Latinized from δ Monocerotis, is a single star in the constellation of Monoceros, positioned about a half degree south of the celestial equator. It has a white hue and is faintly visible to the naked eye with an apparent visual magnitude of 4.15. The distance to this star is approximately 384 light years based on parallax. It is drifting further away from the Sun with a radial velocity of about +15 km/s, having come to within 88 light-years some 7.3 million years ago. The star has an absolute magnitude of −1.20.

The Bright Star Catalogue assigns this star a stellar classification of A2V, suggesting this is an A-type main-sequence star. However, Houk and Swift (1999) found a more evolved subgiant class of A0IV. It has around 2.4 times the mass of the Sun and is an estimated 405 million years old. The star has a high rate of spin with a projected rotational velocity of 175.5 km/s, giving it an equatorial bulge that is 5% larger than the polar radius. It is radiating 350 times the luminosity of the Sun from its photosphere at an effective temperature of 9,462 K.

It has one reported visual companion, designated component B, at an angular separation of 32.0″ and visual magnitude 13.0.
