= Epsilon Monocerotis =

Binary star system in the constellation Monoceros

ε Monocerotis
- Location of ε Monocerotis (circled red)

Observation data Epoch J2000 Equinox
Constellation	Monoceros
- ε Mon A
Right ascension	06^{h} 23^{m} 46.08471^{s}
Declination	4° 35′ 34.3153″
- Apparent magnitude (V): 4.39
- ε Mon B
Right ascension	06^{h} 23^{m} 46.48292^{s}
Declination	4° 35′ 45.2307″
- Apparent magnitude (V): 6.72

Characteristics

ε Mon A
- Evolutionary stage: main sequence
- Spectral type: A5 IV
- U−B color index: +0.14
- B−V color index: +0.20

ε Mon B
- Evolutionary stage: main sequence
- Spectral type: F5 V
- U−B color index: −0.05
- B−V color index: +0.45

Astrometry

ε Mon A
Radial velocity (R_{v})	+13.10 km/s
Proper motion (μ)	RA: −15.127 mas/yr Dec.: +7.701 mas/yr
Parallax (π)	24.0777±0.2691 mas
Distance	135 ± 2 ly (41.5 ± 0.5 pc)
Absolute magnitude (M_{V})	1.52

ε Mon B
Radial velocity (R_{v})	+12.40 km/s
Proper motion (μ)	RA: −18.845 mas/yr Dec.: +0.658 mas/yr
Parallax (π)	25.0633±0.0219 mas
Distance	130.1 ± 0.1 ly (39.90 ± 0.03 pc)
Absolute magnitude (M_{V})	+3.88

Details

ε Mon A
Mass	2.04 M_{☉}
Radius	2.5 R_{☉}
Luminosity	25 L_{☉}
Surface gravity (log g)	3.95 cgs
Temperature	7,923 K
Metallicity [Fe/H]	−0.11 dex
Rotational velocity (v sin i)	149 km/s

ε Mon B
Mass	1.16 M_{☉}
Radius	1.1 R_{☉}
Luminosity	2.39 L_{☉}
Surface gravity (log g)	3.95 cgs
Temperature	7,923 K
Rotational velocity (v sin i)	25 km/s

Other designations
- ε Mon, 8 Monocerotis, CCDM J06237+0436, WDS J06238+0436
- ε Mon A: BD+04°1236, FK5 244, GC 8240, HD 44769, HIP 30419, HR 2298, SAO 113810
- ε Mon B: BD+04°1237, FK5 244, GC 8241, HD 44770, HIP 30422, HR 2299, SAO 113811

Database references
SIMBAD	A
- B

ε Monocerotis, Latinised as Epsilon Monocerotis, is the Bayer designation of a binary star system in the equatorial constellation Monoceros. Its location is a guide for sky navigation toward the Rosette Nebula.

The white-hued primary component has a stellar classification of A5 IV, suggesting it is an aging subgiant star. Its apparent magnitude is 4.39 and it is approximately 135 light years away based on parallax. It is reportedly a spectroscopic binary with a period around 331 days.

The B component, at a separation of around 12.3", is a yellow-white hued F-type main-sequence star of class F5 V and an apparent magnitude of 6.72.
