= Monoceros =

Faint constellation on the celestial equator

- Constellation
- List of stars in Monoceros
- Abbreviation: Mon
- Genitive: Monocerotis
- Pronunciation: /məˈnɒsɪrəs/, genitive /məˌnɒsɪˈroʊtɪs/
- Symbolism: the Unicorn
- Right ascension: 7.15^{h}
- Declination: −5.74°
- Quadrant: NQ2
- Area: 482 sq. deg. (35th)
- Main stars: 4
- Bayer/Flamsteed stars: 32
- Stars brighter than 3.00^{m}: 0
- Stars within 10.00 pc (32.62 ly): 4
- Brightest star: β Mon (3.76^{m})
- Nearest star: Ross 614 or UGPS 0722−05
- Messier objects: 1
- Meteor showers: December Monocerids; Alpha Monocerids
- Bordering constellations: Canis Major; Canis Minor; Gemini; Hydra; Lepus; Orion; Puppis
- Visible at latitudes between +79° and −79°. Best visible at 21:00 (9 p.m.) during the month of February.

Monoceros (Greek: Μονόκερως, "unicorn") is a faint constellation on the celestial equator. Its definition is attributed to the 17th-century cartographer Petrus Plancius. It is bordered by Orion to the west, Gemini to the north, Canis Major to the south, and Hydra to the east. Other bordering constellations include Canis Minor, Lepus, and Puppis.

== Features ==
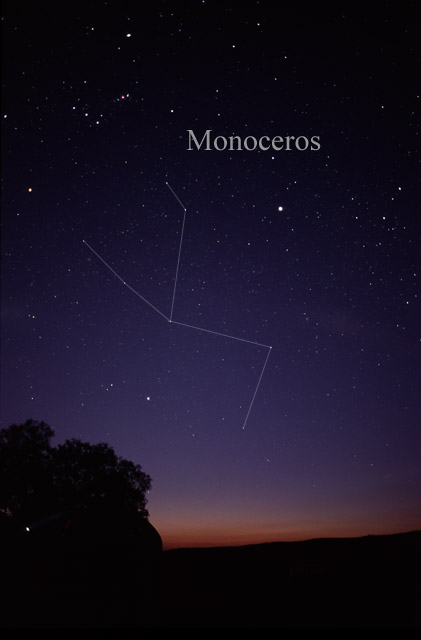
The constellation Monoceros as it can be seen by the naked eye.

=== Stars ===
Monoceros contains only a few fourth magnitude stars, making it difficult to see with the naked eye. Alpha Monocerotis has a visual magnitude of 3.93, while for Gamma Monocerotis it is 3.98.

Beta Monocerotis is a triple star system; the three stars form a fixed triangle. The visual magnitudes of the stars are 4.7, 5.2, and 6.1. William Herschel discovered it in 1781 and called it "one of the most beautiful sights in the heavens".

Epsilon Monocerotis is a fixed binary, with visual magnitudes of 4.5 and 6.5.

S Monocerotis, or 15 Monocerotis, is a bluish white variable star and is located at the center of NGC 2264. The variation in its magnitude is slight (4.2–4.6). It has a companion star of visual magnitude 8.

V838 Monocerotis, a variable red supergiant star, had an outburst starting on January 6, 2002; in February of that year, its brightness increased by a factor of 10,000 in one day. After the outburst was over, the Hubble Space Telescope was able to observe a light echo, which illuminated the dust surrounding the star.

Monoceros also contains Plaskett's Star, a massive binary system whose combined mass is estimated, per 2008 calculations, to be almost 100 solar masses.

Monoceros is the location of the binary system Scholz's Star, host to a red dwarf primary and brown dwarf secondary; the system performed a close flypast of the Solar System approximately 70,000 years ago, travelling within 120,000 astronomical units of the Sun within the Oort cloud.

One of the nearest known black holes to the Solar System is in this constellation. The binary star system A0620-00 in the constellation of Monoceros is at a distance of roughly 3,300 light-years (1,000 parsecs) away. The black hole is estimated to be 6.6 solar masses.

=== Planets ===
Monoceros contains two Super-Earth exoplanets in one planetary system: CoRoT-7b was detected by the CoRoT satellite and CoRoT-7c was detected by the High Accuracy Radial Velocity Planet Searcher from ground-based telescopes. Until the announcement of Kepler-10b in January 2011, CoRoT-7b was the smallest exoplanet to have its diameter measured, at 1.58 times that of the Earth (which would give it a volume 3.95 times Earth's). Both planets in this system were discovered in 2009.

=== Deep-sky objects ===
Part of the galactic plane goes through Monoceros, so background galaxies are concealed by interstellar dust. Monoceros contains many clusters and nebulae; most notable among them are:

- Messier 50, an open cluster
- The Rosette Nebula (NGC 2237, 2238, 2239, and 2246) is a diffuse nebula in Monoceros. It has an overall magnitude of 6.0 and is 4900 light-years from Earth. The Rosette Nebula, over 100 light-years in diameter, has an associated star cluster and possesses many Bok globules in its dark areas. It was independently discovered in the 1880s by Lewis Swift (early 1880s) and Edward Emerson Barnard (1883) as they hunted for comets.
- The Christmas Tree Cluster (NGC 2264) is another open cluster in Monoceros. Named for its resemblance to a Christmas tree, it is fairly bright at an overall magnitude of 3.9; it is 2400 light-years from Earth. The variable star S Monocerotis represents the tree's trunk, while the variable star V429 Monocerotis represents its top.
- The Cone Nebula (NGC 2264), associated with the Christmas Tree Cluster, is a very dim nebula that contains a dark conic structure. It appears clearly in photographs, but is very elusive in a telescope. The nebula contains several Herbig–Haro objects, which are small irregularly variable nebulae. They are associated with protostars.
- NGC 2254 is an open cluster with an overall magnitude of 9.7, 7100 light-years from Earth. It is a Shapley class f and Trumpler class I 2 p cluster, meaning that it appears to be a fairly rich cluster overall, though it has fewer than 50 stars. It appears distinct from the background star field and is very concentrated at its center; its stars range moderately in brightness.
- Hubble's Variable Nebula (NGC 2261) is a nebula with an approximate magnitude of 10, 2500 light-years from Earth. It is named for Edwin Hubble, and was discovered in 1783 by Herschel. Hubble's Variable Nebula is illuminated by R Monocerotis, a young variable star embedded in the nebula; the star's unique interaction with the material in the nebula makes it both an emission nebula and a reflection nebula. One hypothesis regarding their interaction is that the nebula and its illuminating star are a very early stage planetary system.
- IC 447, a reflection nebula.

== History ==
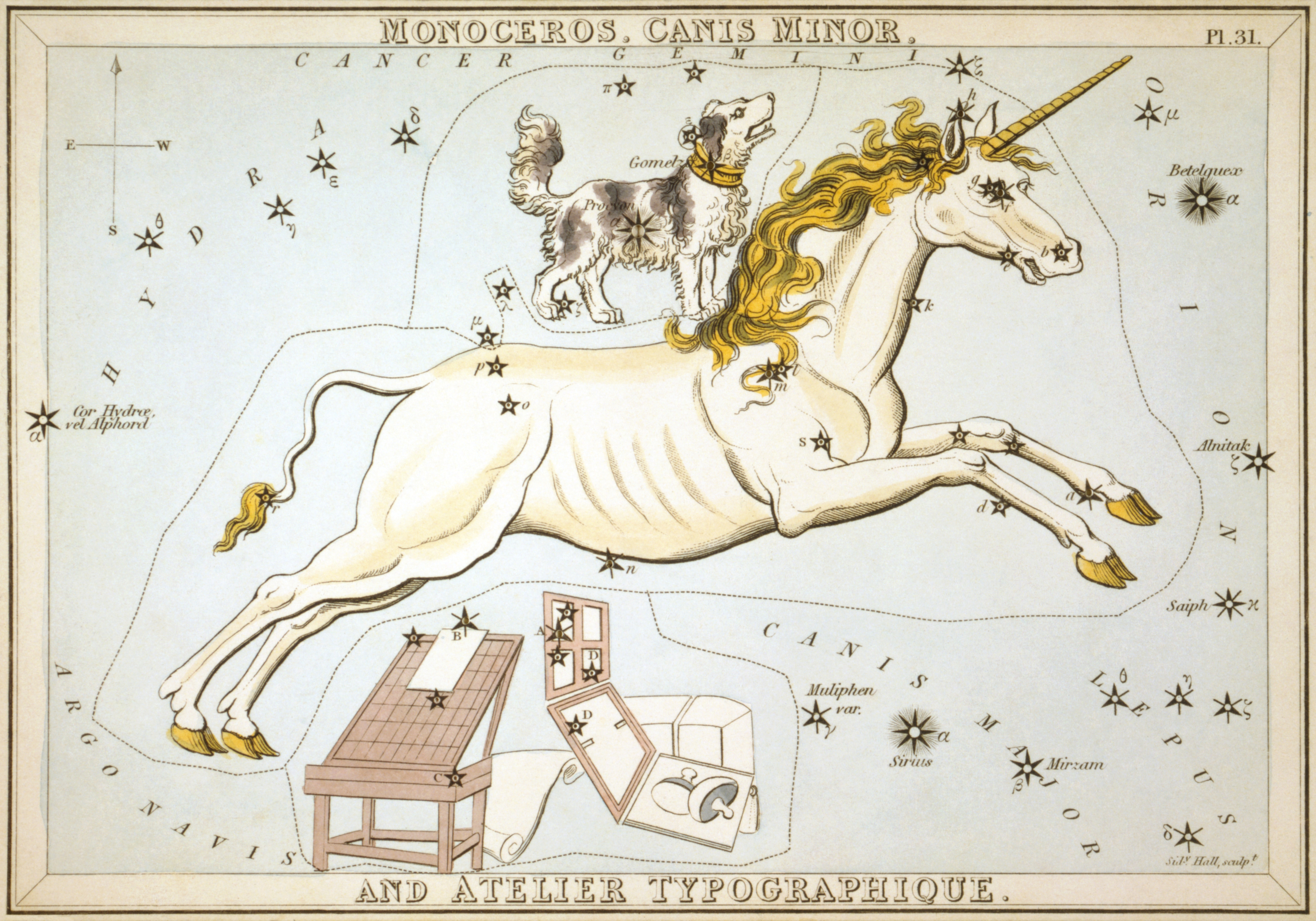
The constellation Monoceros, from Urania's Mirror, a set of star charts from 1825. Includes Canis Minor and the obsolete constellation Printer's Workshop

In Western astronomy, Monoceros is a relatively modern constellation, not one of Ptolemy's 48 in the Almagest. Its first certain appearance was on a globe created by the cartographer Petrus Plancius in 1612 or 1613 and it was later charted by German astronomer Jakob Bartsch as Unicornu on his star chart of 1624.

German astronomers Heinrich Wilhelm Olbers and Ludwig Ideler indicate (according to Richard Hinckley Allen's allegations) that the constellation may be older, quoting an astrological work from 1564 that mentioned "the second horse between the Twins and the Crab has many stars, but not very bright"; these references may ultimately be due to the 13th century Scotsman Michael Scot, but refer to a horse and not a unicorn, and its position does not quite match. Joseph Scaliger (died 1609) is reported to have found Monoceros on an ancient Persian sphere. Astronomer Camille Flammarion (died 1925) believed that a former constellation, Neper (the "Auger"), occupied the part of that sky now deemed Monoceros and Microscopium, but this is disputed.

Chinese asterisms Sze Fūh, the Four Great Canals; Kwan Kew; and Wae Choo, the Outer Kitchen, all lay within the boundaries of Monoceros.

== See also ==
- Monoceros in Chinese astronomy
