= Camelopardalis dark region =

Dark nebula in the constellation Camelopardalis

Nebula
- vdb 14 and vdb 15, part of the Camelopardalis dark region

Observation data: J2000 epoch
- Right ascension: 03^{h} 50^{m}
- Declination: 56° ′ ″
- Distance: 3300 ly (1000 pc)
- Apparent dimensions (V): 20° x 10°
- Constellation: Camelopardalis
- Notable features: Complex of dark clouds associated with the Cam OB1 association

The Camelopardalis dark region is a complex of molecular clouds and dark nebulae visible in the direction of the southern part of the constellation of Camelopardalis. It is a system of clouds and young stars located within the Orion Arm at about 1000 parsecs (3300 light-years) from the Solar System; it shares the same galactic region as Cassiopeia OB6 and lies beyond the star formation complexes of Perseus and Taurus.

The region was not the subject of particular studies until the end of the 20th century, when some surveys were conducted on the dark regions that obscure the Milky Way in this stretch; in the 1990s it was discovered that active star formation phenomena are present here, as evidenced by the presence of a large number of young stellar objects and the OB association catalogued as Camelopardalis OB1, composed of some bright stars of spectral class O and B, plus several dozen stars of class A.

The most distant objects observable in this region of the sky belong to the Cygnus Arm, also known as the Outer Arm, in which the Cam OB3 association and some H II regions associated with it extend.

== Observation ==
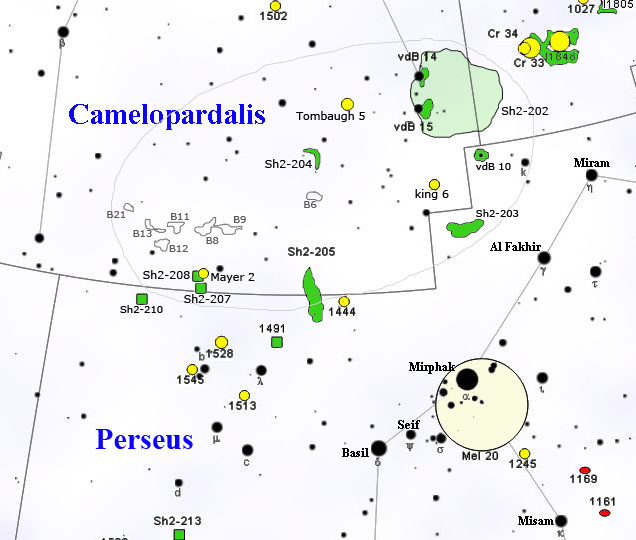
Map of the Camelopardalis dark region centered on the Cam OB1 association. At the bottom is the association of α Persei, and at the top right is the W3/W4/W5 Complex.

The galactic region in the direction of the constellation of Camelopardalis appears visually very obscured: this is in fact the least luminous and showy stretch of the Milky Way trail in the entire celestial vault; it can be observed as a very faint clear halo with a very frayed appearance only on the darkest and clearest nights, and the stellar fields of the region are also very poor. With binoculars it is possible to observe in the region some weak associations of poorly concentrated stars, while most of the stars are scattered and apparently unrelated. The region is easy to locate thanks to the presence of the bright star Mirfak (α Persei), the brightest star in the constellation of Perseus, located at the center of a bright association of blue stars known as the Alpha Persei Cluster (Mel 20), which in turn represents the center of the Perseus OB3 association. The area of sky north of this association corresponds to the dark region of the constellation of Camelopardalis.

The declination of the nebular complex is strongly northern, with an average of 56°N; this means that its observation is possible in particular from the regions located in the terrestrial Northern Hemisphere, where it also appears circumpolar up to the lower temperate latitudes. From the Southern Hemisphere it is possible to observe the complex almost exclusively from the tropical and subtropical belt, from which it is observed extremely low on the northern horizon. (Note: A declination of 56°N is equivalent to an angular distance from the north celestial pole of 34°; this is equivalent to saying that north of 34°N the object appears circumpolar, while south of 34°S the object never rises.) The most suitable period for its observation in the evening sky falls in the months corresponding to the boreal autumn and winter, between the end of October and the whole month of March; the southern part of Camelopardalis appears at the zenith at latitudes corresponding to Northern Europe and Canada, as well as central-southern Russia.

== Structure and galactic environment ==
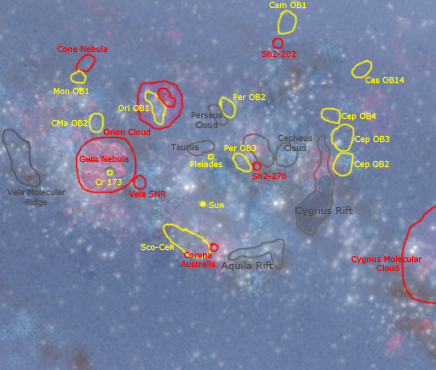
Map of the Orion Arm up to 1500 parsecs from the Sun (visible at the center); the Cam OB1 association is located on the upper side of the image.

The Camelopardalis region is physically located in the outermost part of the Orion Arm, the small secondary spiral arm of the Milky Way in which the Solar System and most of the brightest objects in the celestial vault are located, as well as almost all the stars observable with the naked eye from Earth: the line of sight between the Sun and the region is affected by strong obscurations caused by the masses of gas and interstellar dust dispersed along the arm. The most notable object along the line of sight is the Per OB3 association, an OB association whose brightest stellar components are perfectly visible even without the aid of instruments, as they constitute the group of stars around the bright star Mirfak; this association is located at about 200-250 parsecs from the Sun, thus at a quarter of the distance that separates it from the Camelopardalis region under examination.

Per OB3 is located in the central part of the thickness of the Orion Arm; beyond this extends the Lindblad Ring, at about 300 parsecs, in whose region the Perseus Cloud is also located, but at a high galactic latitude that therefore does not hinder the line of sight in the direction of Camelopardalis. Still further extends a region devoid of large nebular clusters, in which the most notable objects are the open cluster NGC 752 in Andromeda and M34. The Cam OB1 association, centered on the dark nebulae region of Camelopardalis, appears even further, on the edge of the spiral arm; it appears in connection with some emission nebulae, among which Sh2-202 and Sh2-205 stand out. One of the densest dark nebulae belonging to this galactic sector, located near Sh2-202, contains the massive stellar object GL 490, while just before them would be the large complex of dark clouds that includes TGU 942, TGU 994, TGU 1003, TGU 1036, TGU 1041, TGU 1027 (in the direction of μ Persei), TGU 1014, TGU 1006 and TGU 989, arranged to form a ring structure in the southern part of the Camelopardalis region.

The other objects visible in the same direction, such as the two fourth-magnitude stars associated with the reflection nebulae vdB 14 and vdB 15 and the dark complexes located a few degrees west of Sh2-202, belong instead to the most remote part of the Orion Arm, arranged between this and the Perseus Arm, one of the major arms of the Milky Way. All the other bright nebular regions visible in this direction, namely Sh2-203, Sh2-204, Sh2-206 and Sh2-207, would instead belong to the most remote part of the Perseus Arm, a short distance from the Outer Arm, in the galactic region where the Cam OB3 association also lies, whose main stars are HD 237211, a blue supergiant of magnitude 9.05, and BD+63 87, a white-blue subgiant of magnitude 10.01. The area extending between Cam OB1 and the Perseus Arm appears in this direction almost devoid of nebular complexes and notable stars.

== Molecular clouds and star formation regions ==
The main indications of the presence of star formation phenomena in the region are given by the presence of some young stellar objects within the H II regions observable in this direction, such as Sh2-202. In this cloud the most notable object is the infrared source IRAS 03134+5958, which coincides with the star HBC 336, a T Tauri star with strong Hα emissions; this star is located within the open cluster catalogued as Stock 23, whose real existence is doubted as it is suspected that its stars appear associated only due to a perspective effect. Another 12 stars with strong Hα emissions were discovered near the cloud Sh2-205, of which 4 belong to the class of T Tauri. Within the dark dust banks, some high-density cocoons have been identified: 12 of these, coinciding with as many protostars, were identified in the cloud LDN 1400, while CB17 (LDN 1389) and CB26 (LDN 1439) are associated respectively with the infrared sources IRAS 04005+5647 and IRAS 04559+5200, coinciding in turn with protostellar nuclei. A large number of other IRAS sources have been discovered in the surrounding clouds.

One of the most interesting sources in the Camelopardalis complex is IRAS 04376+5413: the object is partially enveloped in the dark cloud LDN 1415 and is associated with the Herbig–Haro object HH 892; during the 2000s this source underwent a notable increase in its luminosity, similar to what had already been observed in similar objects located in other galactic regions. This led to the supposition that the source was associated with a young EX Lupi star or a FU Orionis star, whose main characteristic is precisely a sudden increase in luminosity due to a massive eruption of matter from the protostellar photosphere.

The young stellar objects present in the region tend to be grouped in associations, as is evident in the cloud of GL 490 and in Sh2-205, located in the same galactic sector as the Cam OB1 association; 42 of the young stellar objects observed in this direction actually belong to the Orion Arm, while other more distant objects are located on the Perseus Arm, over 2000 parsecs away.

== OB associations ==
An OB association is a recently formed stellar association that contains dozens of massive stars of spectral class O and B, that is, blue and very hot; they form simultaneously in giant molecular clouds, whose residual gas is swept away by the strong stellar wind and the UV radiation emitted by the same stars that generated it. Within a few million years, most of the brightest stars in the association explode as a supernova, while the smaller stars survive for much longer, due to their lower mass. It is believed that most of the stars in our Galaxy originally belonged to OB associations. Paradoxically, the OB associations of other galaxies can be known more easily than those of our own, due to the presence of dark clouds that mask most of the objects inside the Milky Way.

The associations visible in the direction of the Camelopardalis dark region belong to two distinct spiral arms; the closest, directly related to the dark banks observable in superposition to the Milky Way trail, is Cam OB1, belonging to the Orion Arm. Cam OB3, on the contrary, is located in a much more remote galactic region, on the outer edge of the Orion Arm.

=== Camelopardalis OB1 ===
Cam OB1 is the closest OB association in the Camelopardalis group. It is located just north of the Alpha Persei Cluster and apparently extends over a region with a diameter of 24°; the association is distinguishable into three groups. Cam OB1-A is the northernmost part; it includes the two stars HD 21291 (CS Cam), a blue supergiant α Cygni variable responsible for illuminating the cloud vdB 14, and HD 21389 (CE Cam), also a supergiant variable and responsible for illuminating vdB 15. This subsection also includes the nebula Sh2-202 and the stars associated with it. The second group is Cam OB1-B, which appears centered around the cloud Sh2-205, in the southeastern part of the region, on the border with the constellation of Perseus; the third group, Cam OB1-C, is centered on the cluster NGC 1502. The total dimensions of the association, taking into account an average distance of 1000 parsecs, are about 70-90 parsecs, a fairly typical diameter for an OB association. The distance of the association was estimated by averaging the distance of its components, and is equivalent to 1010±210 parsecs (3292±685 light-years).

Initially 55 stars were indicated as probable members of the association, some of which were excluded following a 2007 study that took into account the photometric distance; of the 43 stars examined, 2 are of classes between O8.5 and O9, 35 are between classes B0 and B3, from blue main-sequence stars to supergiants, and 6 are supergiants of class A, G and K, to which are added another 15 blue supergiants belonging to the cluster NGC 1502. Half of the association's stars are concentrated in the Cam OB1-A group, including the very young GL 490, a high-mass star (about 8-10 M_{☉}), about to enter the phase of Herbig Be star, while in the Cam OB1-B group there are about ten; the supergiant fugitive α Camelopardalis, responsible for illuminating the cloud vdB 30, belonging to NGC 1502 until 2 million years ago and now located at the distance of the Perseus Arm, at a very high galactic latitude, as well as the cluster NGC 1444, located near Sh2-205, may have originally belonged to the association. In the region of the association, the lower-mass stars originated following a star formation cycle that took place over about 100 million years, while for the massive stars that make up the association itself the age must still be verified more precisely.

=== Camelopardalis OB3 ===
The Cam OB3 association is part of the most remote galactic background objects observable in the direction of Camelopardalis; its distance has been estimated at about 3300-4230 parsecs and is therefore located on the outermost part of the Perseus Arm or between this and the Cygnus Arm. Among its brightest stars, visible a few degrees south of NGC 1502 in a strongly obscured region, are HD 237211 and BD+63 87, two supergiants, to which are added about fifteen stars of class O and B on the main sequence, including BD+56 866, of class O9V, and MY Camelopardalis, for a total of 18 confirmed members. In a 2008 study, a possible open cluster physically associated with the Cam OB3 association was identified for the first time, whose coordinates are RA=03^{h} 59^{m} 19^{s} and DEC=+57° 11′ 53″, which contains within it the stars LSI+57°137, of class B1.5V, and BD+56 866, of class O9V. The cluster has been catalogued as Alicante 1; its discovery definitively confirms the existence of the same OB association, which had previously been doubted. According to the authors of this discovery, Cam OB3 is located at a distance of 4000 parsecs (about 13000 light-years).

Cam OB3 is associated with the nebula Sh2-204, visible just west of the above-mentioned cluster, which has a markedly pronounced arc shape; its large apparent extension is indicative of its notable real physical dimensions. A few degrees away in a southwest direction is the cloud Sh2-203, often indicated as part of the same spiral arm as the Cam OB3 association. The galactic environment of the association also includes the nebula Sh2-207, whose primary source of electric arc is the blue subgiant of thirteenth magnitude USNO-A2 1425-05097182, and Sh2-206 (NGC 1491), ionized by the wind of the star BD+50° 886, a blue star of class O5 of magnitude 11.22, with high surface temperature, responsible for the formation of an ionization front advancing at a speed of 0.03 km s^{−1}.

== See also ==
- Dark nebula
- H II region

== Bibliography ==
=== General texts ===
- O'Meara, Stephen James (2007). Deep Sky Companions: Hidden Treasures. Cambridge University Press. ISBN 978-0-521-83704-0.
- Robert Burnham, Jr (1978). Burnham's Celestial Handbook: Volume Two. New York: Dover Publications, Inc.
- Thomas T. Arny (2007). Explorations: An Introduction to Astronomy (3 updated ed.). Boston: McGraw-Hill. ISBN 978-0-07-321369-9.
- AA.VV (2002). L'Universo - Grande enciclopedia dell'astronomia [The Universe - Great Encyclopedia of Astronomy] (in Italian). Novara: De Agostini.
- Gribbin, J. (2005). Enciclopedia di astronomia e cosmologia [Encyclopedia of Astronomy and Cosmology] (in Italian). Milano: Garzanti. ISBN 88-11-50517-8.
- Owen, W. (2006). Atlante illustrato dell'Universo [Illustrated Atlas of the Universe] (in Italian). Milano: Il Viaggiatore. ISBN 88-365-3679-4.

=== Specific texts ===
==== On stellar evolution ====
- Lada, C. J.; N. D. Kylafits (1999). The Origin of Stars and Planetary Systems. Kluwer Academic Publishers. ISBN 0-7923-5909-7.
- De Blasi, A. (2002). Le stelle: nascita, evoluzione e morte [Stars: birth, evolution, and death] (in Italian). Bologna: CLUEB. ISBN 88-491-1832-5.
- Abbondi, C. (2007). Universo in evoluzione dalla nascita alla morte delle stelle [The evolving universe from the birth to the death of stars] (in Italian). Sandit. ISBN 978-88-89150-32-0.

==== On the galactic region of Camelopardalis ====
- Straižys, V.; Laugalys, V. (2008). "Young Stars and Clouds in Camelopardalis". In Reipurth, Bo (ed.). Handbook of Star Forming Regions, Volume I: The Northern Sky. Vol. 4. ASP Monograph Publications. Bibcode:2008hsf1.book..294S. ISBN 978-1-58381-670-7.

=== Celestial charts ===
- Toshimi Taki (2005). "Taki's 8.5 Magnitude Star Atlas". Archived from the original on November 5, 2018. - Celestial atlas freely downloadable in PDF format.
- Tirion, Wil; Rappaport, Barry; Lovi, George (1987). Uranometria 2000.0 - Volume I - The Northern Hemisphere to -6°. Richmond, Virginia, USA: Willmann-Bell, inc. ISBN 0-943396-14-X.
- Tirion, Wil; Sinnott, Roger W. (1998). Sky Atlas 2000.0 (2 ed.). Cambridge, USA: Cambridge University Press. ISBN 0-933346-90-5.
- Tirion, Wil (2001). The Cambridge Star Atlas 2000.0 (3 ed.). Cambridge, USA: Cambridge University Press. ISBN 0-521-80084-6.
