= Monoceros OB1 =

OB association and giant molecular cloud in the constellation Monoceros

Emission nebula
- H II region

Observation data: J2000 epoch
- Right ascension: 06^{h} 34^{m} 60^{s}
- Declination: +10° 05′ 60″
- Distance: ~2,350 to ~2,600 ly
- Constellation: Monoceros
- Designations: [WAM91] Monoceros I, Monoceros I, Monoceros OB1 Molecular Cloud, Monoceros I Association

Monoceros OB1 (or the Monoceros OB1 Molecular Cloud for the giant molecular cloud) is an active star-forming region and giant molecular cloud (GMC) approximately 2,350 to 2,600 light-years (or 720 to 800 parsecs) away in the constellation Monoceros, toward the galactic anticenter direction.

== Observations ==
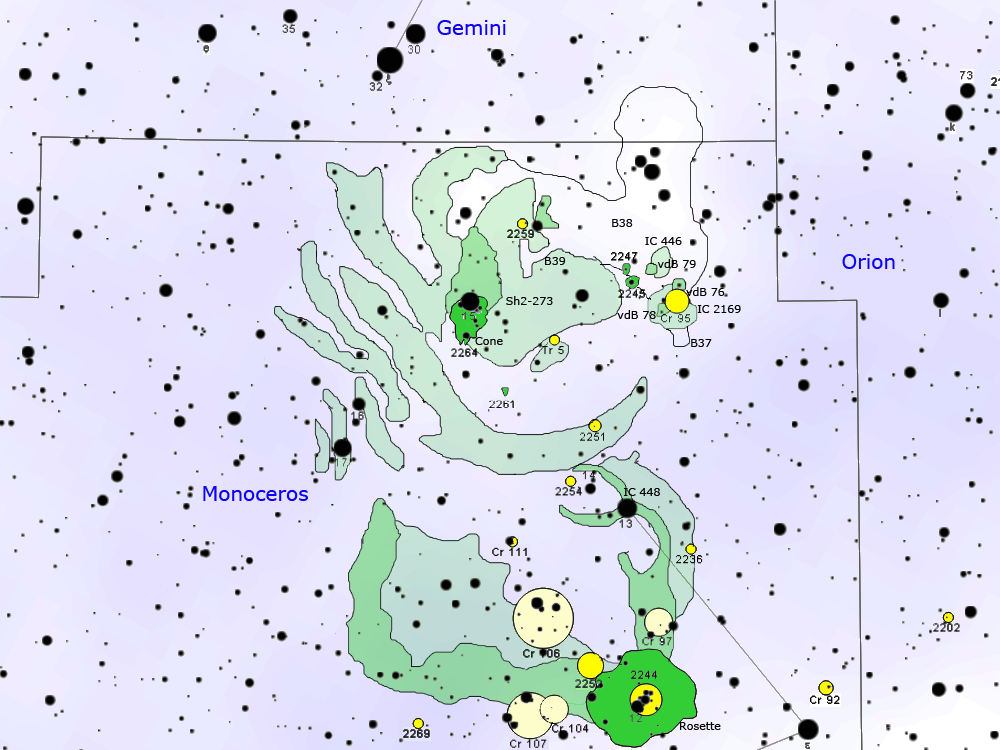
A map of northeastern Monoceros shows the Monoceros OB1 region around NGC 2264 and the Monoceros OB2 region around the Rosette Nebula

Monoceros OB1 region is located in northwestern Monoceros and is centered around NGC 2264. Most of the Monoceros OB1 region is visible through amateur telescopes, including the Cone Nebula and IC 447 while the huge cloud around NGC 2264 is visible through H-alpha (Hα) filters. The farthest component is Monoceros R1 at 800 pc while the closest component is NGC 2264 at 720 pc.

== Structure ==
=== NGC 2264 ===
NGC 2264 is an open cluster and H II region that forms the center of the Monoceros OB1 region. The Cone Nebula, the Fox Fur Nebula, the Christmas Tree Cluster, and the Snowflake Cluster are located within NGC 2264. The region is enriched with hydrogen and helium that fuel the formation of new luminous stars.

=== Monoceros R1 Molecular Cloud ===
The Monoceros R1 Molecular Cloud is a stellar association and molecular cloud adjacent to NGC 2264. Monoceros R1 is rich in B-type stars and T Tauri stars, with most of these stars located within the core designated as IC 447. The open cluster Collinder 95 created IC 447 via supernovae. Monoceros R1 has a ring like structure that created the most of complex through shock-induced heating. The reflection nebulae associated with Monoceros R1 are IC 447, IC 446, VdB 76, VdB 77, NGC 2247, and NGC 2245.

=== G202.3+2.5 ===
The filament designated as G202.3+2.5 is a complex star-forming cloud located at the edge of the Monoceros OB1 region. This filament is composed of a background northern filament and a foreground main filament. These two components are moving towards each other, the tip of the northern and main filament is collided approximately one hundred thousand years ago. The filament is rich in protostars, which are found mostly in the colliding region while the rest of the filament has little to no star formation.

=== East Molecular Cloud ===
The Monoceros OB1 East Molecular Cloud is a giant molecular cloud that occupies the eastern portion of the Monoceros OB1 Molecular Cloud. The region has a greater influence on the dynamics of the southern region than in the northern region. The filaments and diffuse inflows in the southern part are perpendicular to the magnetic field of the East Molecular Cloud. The northern region is stabilized by the magnetic field and turbulence of the east cloud at scales larger than a parsec.

=== Other objects ===
Herbig–Haro objects HH 225 and HH 226 may be connected to HH 125. These Herbig–Haro objects along with HH 575 and HH 572 which have an unknown source, are not associated with any major carbon monoxide (CO) outflow. The CO outflows and Herbig–Haro objects form very differently, the Herbig–Haro objects are mostly concentrated in the middle of the cloud while the CO outflows are evenly distributed. This shows that the Monoceros OB1 region had a experienced enhanced star formation activity somewhere earlier in its life and primarily occurred in the middle of the region where NGC 2264 is located. The discovery of nine molecular outflows that have luminosities greater than LDN 1551 proves that the solar neighborhood within 1 kpc from the Sun is more abundant in molecular outflows than previously thought.

== Star formation ==
=== Monoceros OB1 Association ===
Most star formation occurs in the Monoceros OB1 association, which is an OB association. The stars in the Monoceros OB1 region are mostly O-type and B-type stars that ionize a vast Hα halo spanning roughly 1.5° in radius. Star formation has been sustained for about 2 to 5 million years with most star formation concentrated in the southern region. Monoceros R1 has different star formation characteristics compared to Monoceros OB1, this is because Monoceros R1 produces only intermediate or low-mass stars rather than high-mass stars like the rest of the association. The S Monocerotis moving group is composed mainly of pre main sequence stars and O and B-type stars, these stars are formed the Hα halo around NGC 2264 and the Fox Fur Nebula through supernovae.
