= Monoceros R2 =

Molecular cloud complex in the constellation Monoceros

Monoceros R2 Molecular Cloud Complex
Molecular cloud
- Giant molecular cloud
- ESO DSS 2 visible light wide-field image of the region around Monoceros R2 Molecular Cloud Complex.

Observation data: J2000 epoch
- Right ascension: 06^{h} 08^{m} 40^{s}
- Declination: −06° 20′
- Distance: 2710 ly (830 pc)
- Constellation: Monoceros
- Notable features: includes various reflection nebulae
- Designations: Monoceros R2 Molecular Cloud

The Monoceros R2 Molecular Cloud Complex, also known as the Monoceros R2 Molecular Cloud, is a predominantly unilluminated giant molecular cloud, located in the southwestern part of the constellation of Monoceros; it is a dust system situated at a very high galactic latitude, below the plane of the Milky Way, at approximately 830 parsecs (2700 light-years) from the Solar System.

The most notable feature of the complex is the presence of a large number of reflection nebulae, illuminated by the hot, blue stars of the Monoceros R2 association, an OB association formed from the same gases it now illuminates; these stars, part of the first cycle of star formation in the complex, impart a distinctly bluish color to the gas, clearly visible even with amateur instruments or in photographs.

At the heart of the nebular complex, a second cycle of star formation is occurring, as evidenced by the presence of a rich open cluster in formation, primarily composed of low- and medium-mass stars, clearly visible in observations conducted in the infrared band.

== Observation ==
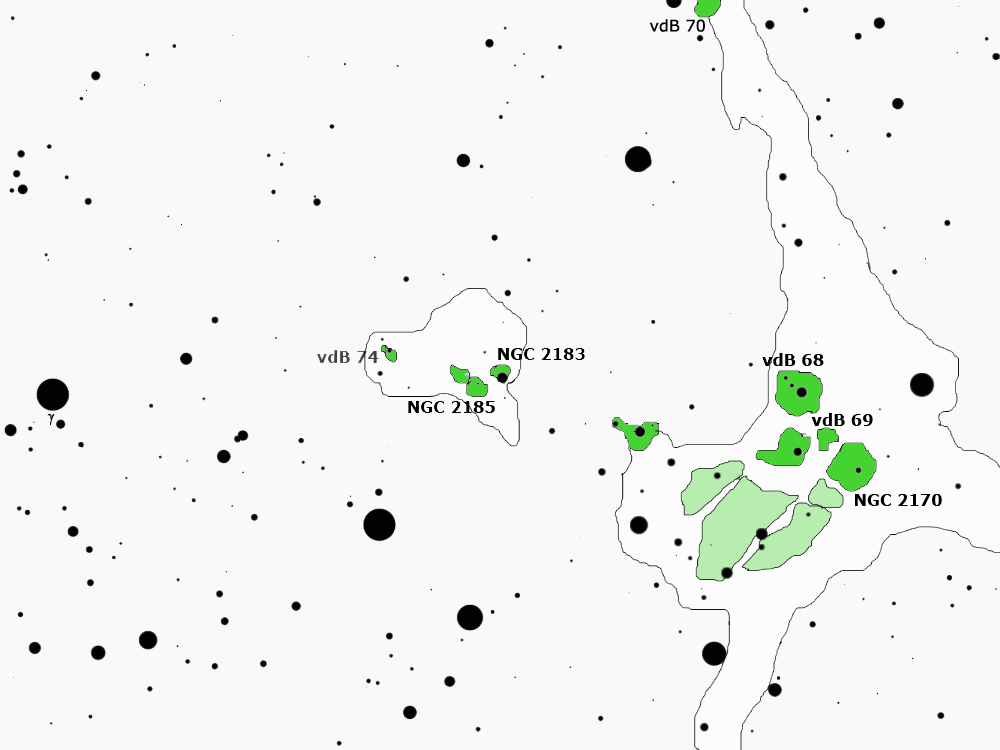
Map of the Monoceros R2 Complex, highlighting all structures; the bright star on the left is γ Monocerotis.

The Monoceros R2 complex is observed in the southwestern part of the constellation, east of the Orion Nebula and slightly southwest of Barnard's Loop, which, however, is not physically close to the complex; its position can be identified with relative ease, thanks to the presence of the star γ Monocerotis, an orange giant with an apparent magnitude of 3.99. Using this star as a reference, the complex can be observed starting about 1° westward; in particular, at exactly 1°, some reflection nebulae, cataloged as NGC 2185 and NGC 2183, can be found, which are also the brightest in the region. These clouds can be observed directly without the aid of filters, thanks to their brightness, using a medium-powered amateur telescope; although a very dark sky is required and despite the small size of the nebulae, they appear as small bright patches surrounding bluish stars of tenth and eleventh magnitude.

Approximately 1° west of these clouds lies the central part of the complex; here, other reflection nebulae, larger than the previous ones, are arranged in an arc. The southernmost is also the brightest and is cataloged as NGC 2170 (vdB 67); it is illuminated by a blue spectral class B star of tenth magnitude. To the north, the other two clouds, vdB 68 and vdB 69, are illuminated by equally massive stars. All these nebulae are easily observable and are illuminated by the most massive stars of the nebular complex, members of the OB association Monoceros R2.

The complex lies west of the bright trail of the Milky Way; being at a declination of just 6° south, it can be observed from all populated regions of the Earth. From the South Pole, it appears circumpolar, while it remains invisible only from the regions closest to the North Pole; at the latitudes of the Amazon rainforest and the Congo, it appears at the zenith during the evenings of January and February. From Mediterranean regions and North America, it is a winter sky object and appears moderately high on the southern horizon; conversely, from the Southern Hemisphere, it is visible especially during summer evenings, toward the north and slightly higher on the horizon.

== Galactic environment ==
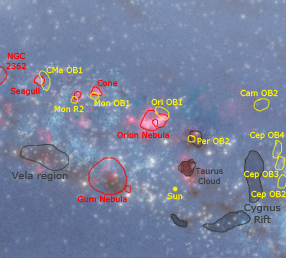
Map of the galactic region between the Sun (bottom right relative to the center) and the Monoceros R2 complex (top left relative to the center).

The Monoceros R2 complex is located within the Orion Arm at a distance of 830 parsecs, in a relatively peripheral region of the arm, approximately 1800 parsecs from the innermost edge of the Perseus Arm, where the Rosette Nebula and the associated Monoceros OB2 association lie. The galactic environment between the Mon R2 and Mon OB2 complexes corresponds to the inter-arm space, a region poor in interstellar gas and thus also in star formation processes, resulting in the absence of massive stars and the low luminosity of inter-arm spaces in general, which predominantly contain low-mass stars. Just 150–200 parsecs northward lies a nebular complex similar in size to Mon R2 but with entirely different characteristics: the Monoceros OB1 Molecular Cloud, which includes the well-known Cone Nebula and where large-scale star formation processes are producing massive stars and, in particular, a large number of low- and medium-mass stars; unlike Mon R2, this complex lies almost exactly on the galactic plane. At a very northern galactic latitude, almost outside the galactic plane and corresponding to the Mon R2 complex, lies one of the oldest and most well-known open clusters, the M67, in the constellation of Cancer.

Approximately 400 parsecs toward the Sun, at a different galactic latitude, lies the Orion nebular region, dominated by the Orion A and Orion B complexes and the Orion Nebula, which also includes the Lambda Orionis ring and some of the peripheral regions of the complex, such as gas filaments and small regions with active star formation. The stellar wind of the massive stars in the Orion complex has generated a superbubble, whose boundaries are highlighted by Barnard's Loop, located a few degrees northwest of Mon R2; however, this gas ring is not physically linked to the Mon R2 complex, as it is much closer to the Sun.

Approximately 400 parsecs from Mon R2 lies the Canis Major OB1 association, linked to the nebular region of the Seagull Nebula and its associated reflection nebulae, such as vdB 88 and vdB 90; the Seagull Nebula is a large H II region where star formation processes are occurring.

== Characteristics and structure ==
The most notable feature of the region is an extensive sequence of reflection nebulae, spanning up to 2° across the celestial sphere; these nebulae are illuminated by a group of young, hot, massive spectral class B and A stars that form a stellar association; it has been designated R2 as it was the second OB association discovered in the constellation of Monoceros associated with reflection nebulae, after Monoceros R1, part of Monoceros OB1. The central region of the nebular complex coincides with the clouds vdB 67 and vdB 69, where star formation processes are active. The stars of the association are predominantly class B, i.e., blue stars; their age is estimated at 6–10 million years, representing the most massive stellar generation formed in the region. These stars illuminate the same clouds from which they formed; given their young age, their stellar wind has not yet dispersed the surrounding gas clouds.

The reflection nebulae constitute a small illuminated portion of a large nebular molecular complex, clearly visible in highly light-sensitive astronomical photographs as it obscures the background stellar fields, tracing a series of dark silhouettes in this part of the sky; the heart of the complex consists of four major condensations, known as LDN 1643, 1644, 1645, and 1646, whose illuminated parts correspond to the reflection nebulae of the van den Bergh catalogue. Most of these reflection nebulae show a peak in CO emissions, also exhibiting high temperatures; at this same wavelength, the central body of the nebular molecular complex has been identified through increasingly precise mappings of the region in the ^{12}CO band. The total mass of the complex is estimated at around 90,000 M_{☉}.

The peripheral areas of the complex exhibit filamentary gas structures, identified through CO observations and mappings, extending in a north-south direction; the largest of these filaments appears to originate from the central region and extend particularly northward, diverging by about 2°. According to a study on the global velocity of the complex conducted in the CO band, it appears to coincide with an expanding superbubble whose center aligns with the NGC 2182 cloud; the source of the energy driving the superbubble's expansion is not well-defined, while its dynamic age is estimated at about 4 million years.

The distance of the complex was initially estimated, through spectroscopy and photometry of its brightest stars, at 830 ± 50 parsecs (2,710 ± 160 light-years); this measurement is still considered the most accurate and precise, and thus the most accepted by the scientific community. In the past, other distance values have been proposed, all within the range of 700 to 950 parsecs, thus accepting its position in the same galactic environment as the Monoceros OB1 region.

== Star formation processes ==
The complex has undergone two waves of star formation processes. The first, dating back about 6 million years, produced the massive stars observable in the region and constituting the Mon R2 association, responsible for illuminating the reflection nebulae; the age of these stars is comparable to that of the expanding superbubble. The second wave is still ongoing, as evidenced by the presence within the dark clouds of small ionized hydrogen regions, masers, and HH objects; according to evolutionary models, the second wave of star formation was likely triggered by the combined action of the stellar wind from the young giants of the first wave, which further compressed the surrounding cloud gases. The first wave of star formation, however, has a completely different origin; according to a 1998 study, the initial compression of the complex's gases occurred about 6 million years ago due to an enormous superbubble, designated GSH 238+00+09, which originated in a region between the current Orion and Gum Nebula complexes, whose expansion compressed the gases around the region and triggered star formation in both the Orion Complex and Mon R2; the origin of this large superbubble could be the stellar association Cr 121, visible in the direction of Canis Major.

In the core of the complex, an infrared observation identified a star cluster tightly enveloped in dust and gas; this cluster spans about 4.5′ × 8.5′, corresponding to 1.1 × 2.1 parsecs, and contains a large number of X-ray sources, identified by the Chandra X-ray Observatory and coinciding with young stellar objects. Its youngest stars are Class I protostars, distributed asymmetrically in accordance with the gas distribution, while slightly more evolved stars (Class II) show a more extended distribution; in addition to the stellar components, about fifteen minor molecular hydrogen jets are known, generated by Class 0 stars in formation. These are accompanied by a powerful CO outflow, one of the most massive known, which has created a large cavity within the core of the complex through its shock wave. The southern and northeastern regions of the cluster are rich in small cometary or bipolar nebular globules, whose shapes suggest they are protostars still enveloped in their accretion disk; these stars are arranged in long chains.

Within this cluster, five moderately powerful infrared sources have been discovered, cataloged as IRS 1, IRS 2, IRS 3, IRS 4, and IRS 5, along with two additional sources (IRS 6 and IRS 7) identified in the Hα band. IRS 3 is the most complex: it is surrounded by a conical-shaped cloud and contains six luminous sources, grouped into two subgroups identified as IRS 3A and IRS 3B; the latter shows three material jets at its edges, originating from the internal components of the source and emitted by stars in formation. Among the molecular components of the IRS 3 source, polycyclic aromatic hydrocarbons have also been discovered, with their absorption lines identified in the source's infrared spectrum. The IRS 1 and IRS 2 sources are surrounded by a single, strongly polarized ring-shaped reflection nebula; these two sources, along with IRS 3, are the brightest in the complex: IRS 1 dominates at the 20 μm wavelength, IRS 2 at 10 μm. The luminosity of the three sources has been estimated at 3000 L_{☉}, 6500 L_{☉}, and 14,000 L_{☉}, respectively.

Among the HH objects, the most notable are HH 866, coinciding with the IRAS source 06046-0603, HH 272 and HH 273, constituting the GGD 16-17 region, located near IRS 1 and hosting minor star formation processes.

== See also ==
- Reflection nebula
- H II region

== Bibliography ==
- O'Meara, Stephen James (2007). Deep Sky Companions: Hidden Treasures. Cambridge University Press. ISBN 978-0-521-83704-0.
- Burnham, Robert (1978). Burnham's Celestial Handbook: Volume Two. New York: Dover Publications, Inc.
- Arny, Thomas T. (2007). Explorations: An Introduction to Astronomy (3 updated ed.). Boston: McGraw-Hill. ISBN 978-0-07-321369-9.
- AA.VV (2002). L'Universo - Grande enciclopedia dell'astronomia [The Universe - Great Encyclopedia of Astronomy] (in Italian). Novara: De Agostini.
- Gribbin, J. (2005). Enciclopedia di astronomia e cosmologia [Encyclopedia of Astronomy and Cosmology] (in Italian). Milano: Garzanti. ISBN 88-11-50517-8.
- Owen, W. (2006). Atlante illustrato dell'Universo [Illustrated Atlas of the Universe] (in Italian). Milano: Il Viaggiatore. ISBN 88-365-3679-4.
- Lada, C. J.; Kylafits, N. D. (1999). The Origin of Stars and Planetary Systems. Kluwer Academic Publishers. ISBN 0-7923-5909-7.
- De Blasi, A. (2002). Le stelle: nascita, evoluzione e morte [Stars: Birth, Evolution, and Death] (in Italian). Bologna: CLUEB. ISBN 88-491-1832-5.
- Abbondi, C. (2007). Universo in evoluzione dalla nascita alla morte delle stelle [Evolving Universe from the Birth to the Death of Stars] (in Italian). Sandit. ISBN 978-88-89150-32-0.
- Carpenter, J. M.; Hodapp, K. W. (2008). The Monoceros R2 Molecular Cloud. Handbook of Star Forming Regions, Volume I: The Northern Sky ASP Monograph Publications. Vol. 4. p. 899. Bibcode:2008hsf1.book..966D. ISBN 978-1-58381-670-7.

=== Star charts ===
- Taki, Toshimi (2005). "Taki's 8.5 Magnitude Star Atlas". Archived from the original on 2018-11-05. - Freely downloadable star atlas in PDF format.
- Tirion; Rappaport; Lovi (1987). Uranometria 2000.0 - Volume II - The Southern Hemisphere to +6°. Richmond, Virginia, USA: Willmann-Bell, inc. ISBN 0-943396-15-8.
- Tirion; Sinnott (1998). Sky Atlas 2000.0 (2 ed.). Cambridge, USA: Cambridge University Press. ISBN 0-933346-90-5.
- Tirion (2001). The Cambridge Star Atlas 2000.0 (3 ed.). Cambridge, USA: Cambridge University Press. ISBN 0-521-80084-6.
