= Monoceros R1 =

Molecular cloud complex in the constellation Monoceros

Molecular cloud
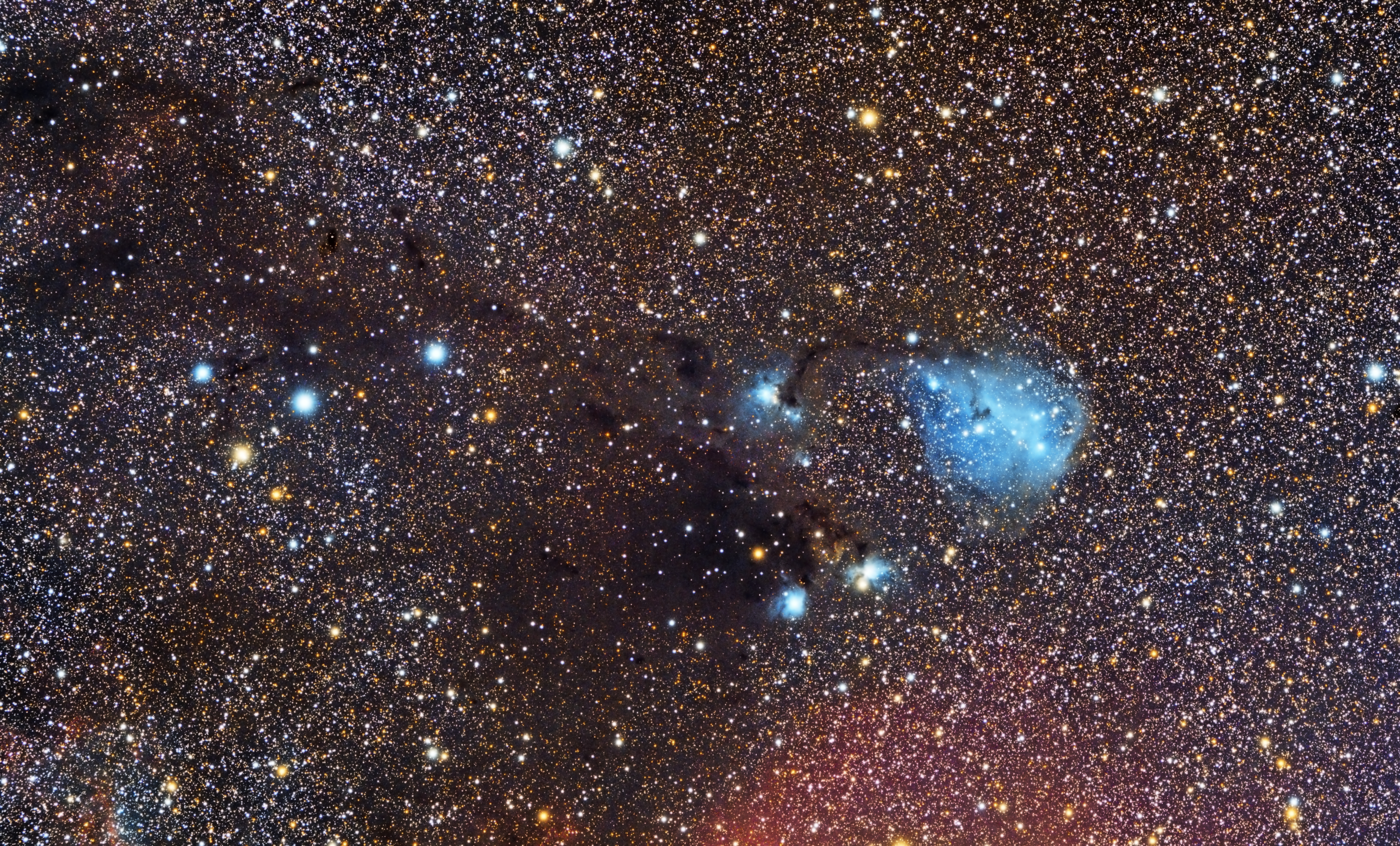
- Image of Monoceros R1 and surrounding dark clouds

Observation data: J2000 epoch
- Right ascension: 06^{h} 31^{m} 60^{s}
- Declination: +10° 11′ 60″
- Distance: ~2,300 ly
- Constellation: Monoceros
- Designations: Monoceros R1 Ring, Monoceros R1 Association

Monoceros R1 Molecular Cloud Complex, also known as the Monoceros R1 Ring is a young stellar association and predominantly unilluminated molecular cloud complex located roughly 2,300 light-years (ly) away in the constellation Monoceros on the galactic plane. Monoceros R1, along with the Monoceros OB1 association forms a minor part of the larger Monoceros OB1 Molecular Cloud.

== Observations ==
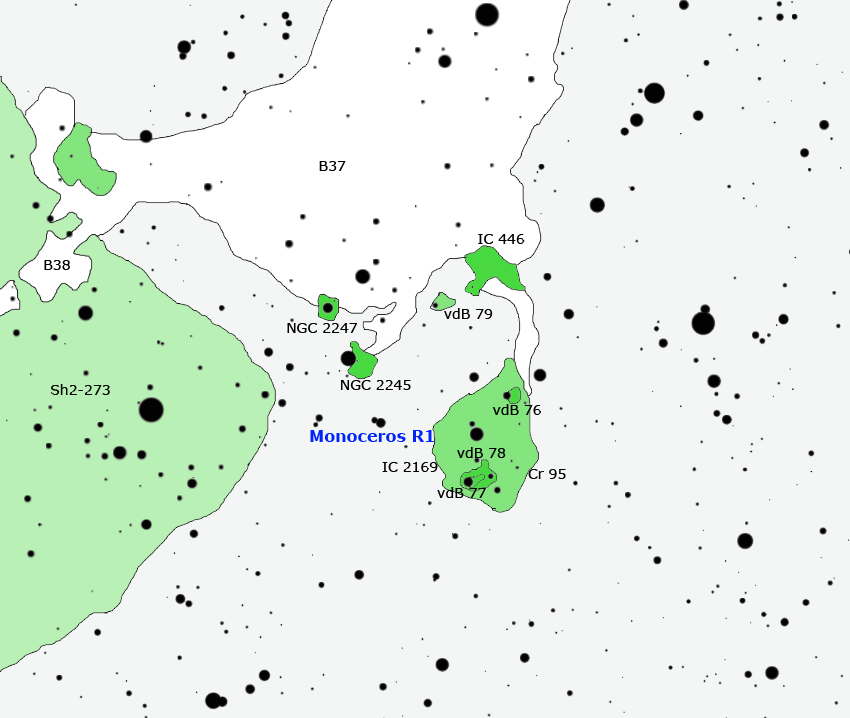
Map of the Monoceros R1 Molecular Cloud

The complex contains a large number of reflection nebulae illuminated by the Monoceros R1 OB association, this stellar association formed at the same time as the Monoceros OB1 association, these associations were formed by turbulent winds from the main Monoceros OB1 Molecular Cloud. The stars of the Monoceros R1 OB association are mostly T Tauri emission line stars or B-type stars. Most of the B-type stars are located in Collinder 95, an open cluster that created reflection nebula IC 447 via supernovae.

Unlike the rest of the Monoceros OB1, Monoceros R1 does not produce high-mass stars, most of the stars produced are usually intermediate or low-mass stars. The region also has a halo of escaping stars.

=== Structure ===
Monoceros R1 is located near Sh 2-273 and is adjacent to the massive H II region NGC 2264. Monoceros R1 exhibits a ring like structure composed of dust clouds and reflection nebulae. This ring appears to be kinematically different from the rest of the Monoceros OB1 Molecular Cloud, this ring and its components seem to located further away than the components of NGC 2264. NGC 2264 primarily contains high-velocity materials while lower-velocity materials is located near or in Monoceros R1. The reflection nebulae IC 447, IC 446, VdB 76, VdB 77, NGC 2247, and NGC 2245 are members of Monoceros R1, this is because they are kinematically different. Portions of the molecular clouds in the north like Barnard 37 are likely not members of Monoceros R1. A dark nebula or filament designated as LDN 1607 connects IC 446 to IC 447, this dark nebula has a mass of 1465 M_{☉} and a length of 14 pc. This dark nebula formed these reflection nebulae and primarily contains YSOs.

The ring has a diameter of approximately 12 pc and an average thickness of 2 pc. The carbon monoxide (CO) emissions in VdB 77, VdB 82, and NGC 2245 suggest that Monoceros R1 experienced shock-induced heating. The ring of Monoceros R1 most likely formed roughly one million years ago by a supernova blast wave, stellar wind, or an expending H II region.
