= 1 Camelopardalis =

Double star system in the constellation Camelopardalis

- Location of 1 Camelopardalis (circled)

Observation data Epoch J2000 Equinox ICRS
- Constellation: Camelopardalis
- 1 Cam A
- Right ascension: 04^{h} 32^{m} 01.841^{s}
- Declination: +53° 54′ 39.02″
- Apparent magnitude (V): 5.77
- 1 Cam B
- Right ascension: 04^{h} 32^{m} 00.915^{s}
- Declination: +53° 54′ 45.35″
- Apparent magnitude (V): 6.803

Characteristics

1 Cam A
- Spectral type: O9.7IIn
- U−B color index: −0.73
- B−V color index: +0.18
- Variable type: SPB?

1 Cam B
- Spectral type: B1IV:
- U−B color index: −0.70
- B−V color index: +0.16

Astrometry

1 Cam A
Proper motion (μ)	RA: +2.775 mas/yr Dec.: −3.783 mas/yr
Parallax (π)	1.2630±0.0486 mas
Distance	2,580 ± 100 ly (790 ± 30 pc)

1 Cam B
Proper motion (μ)	RA: +0.775 mas/yr Dec.: −3.211 mas/yr
Parallax (π)	1.1211±0.0462 mas
Distance	2,900 ± 100 ly (890 ± 40 pc)
Absolute magnitude (M_{V})	−5.53

Details

1 Cam A
Luminosity	4,365 L_{☉}
Surface gravity (log g)	3.65 cgs
Temperature	29,800 K
Rotational velocity (v sin i)	275 km/s

1 Cam B
Luminosity	1,995 L_{☉}
Temperature	29,512 K
Rotational velocity (v sin i)	11 km/s
Age	<20 Myr

Other designations
- DL Camelopardalis, HR 1417, HD 28446, SAO 24672, BD+53°779, FK5 165, WDS J04320+5355, HIP 21148

Database references
SIMBAD	data
- 1 Cam A
- 1 Cam B

1 Camelopardalis (1 Cam) is a double star system in the constellation Camelopardalis. Its combined apparent magnitude is 5.56 and it is approximately 800 parsecs (2,600 ly) away. It is faintly visible to the naked eye under good observing conditions.

The 1 Camelopardalis system is part of the Camelopardalis OB1 stellar association, which is 820 pc away. 1 Camelopardalis A is a hot massive star which has evolved away from the main sequence to become a giant. It was once reported to be a double-lined spectroscopic binary with an orbital period of 1.31 days, but this has not been confirmed since. 1 Camelopardalis B is 10" away and is probably an early B class subgiant. An additional star was discovered using the CHARA array, and has a mean separation from 1 Camelopardalis A of 26.16 mas.

There is an 11th magnitude star 150" away. It has been considered to be a member of a triple system, but Gaia observations show it to be an unrelated background object.

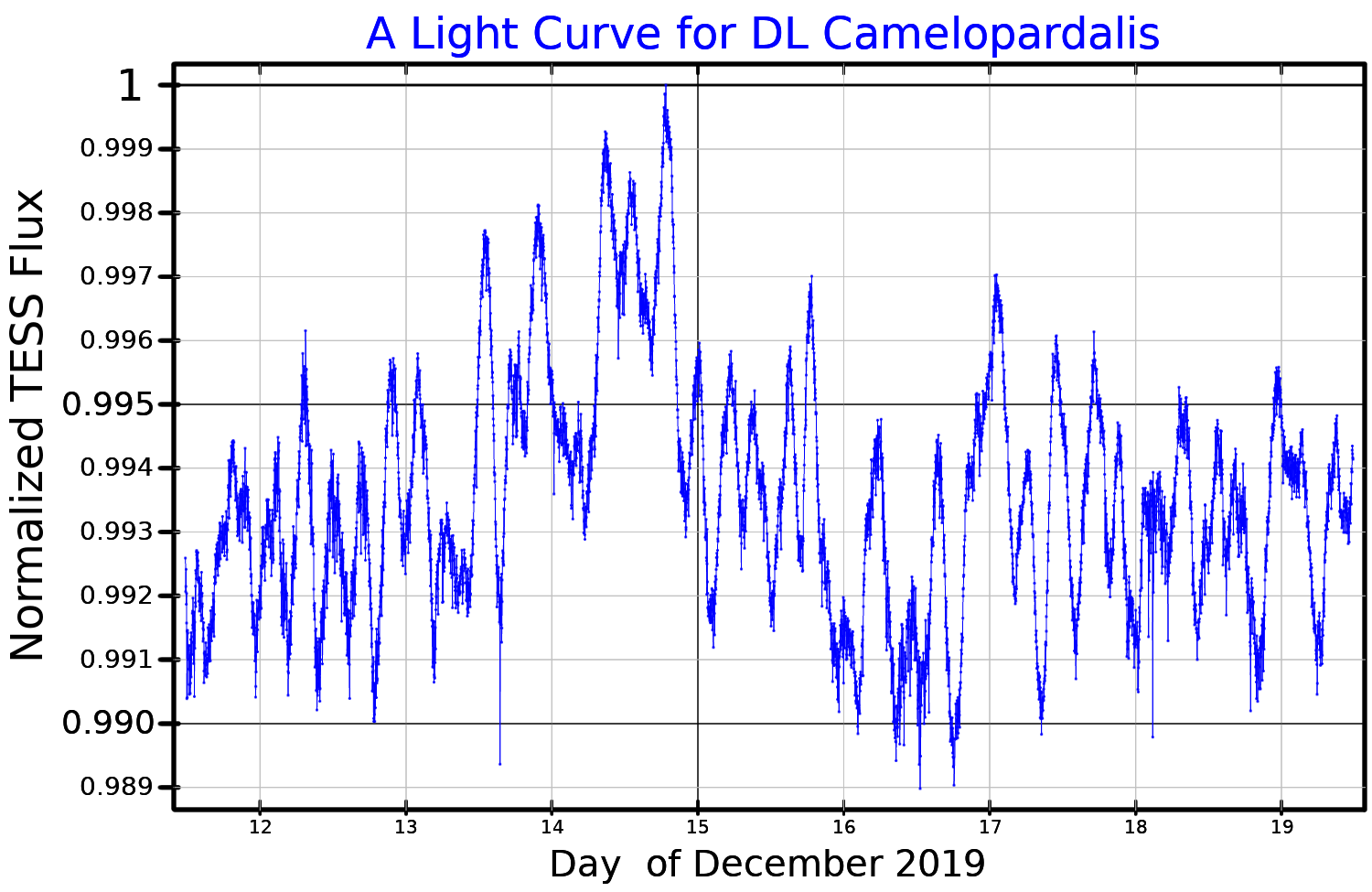
A light curve for DL Camelopardalis, plotted from TESS data

In 1982, Mikołaj Jerzykiewicz and Christiaan L. Sterken reported that 1 Camelopardalis might be a variable star, but some subsequent studies failed to confirm that. Its brightness was convincingly shown to be variable when the Hipparcos data was analyzed. It was given its variable star designation, DL Camelopardalis, in 1999. 1 Camelopardalis A is a variable star with a small amplitude. It has a likely period of 0.22132 days and is thought to be a β Cephei variable or slowly pulsating B-type star. Hipparcos photometry shows an amplitude of 0.035 magnitudes. It has a rotational velocity of 275 km/s, one of the highest known.
