= Berkeley 86 =

Young open cluster in Cygnus

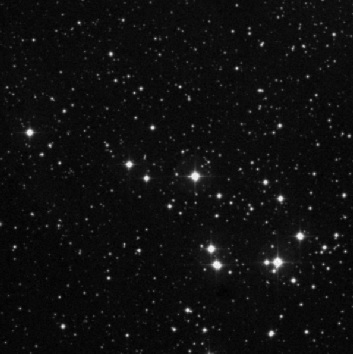

Observation data (J2000 epoch)
- Right ascension: 20^{h} 20^{m} 12.0^{s}
- Declination: +38° 41′ 24″
- Distance: 1,720 pc
- Apparent dimensions (V): 5

Physical characteristics
- Other designations: OCISM 35, OCl 167.0, MWSC 3316, C 2018+385, OCl 167, KPR2004b 485

Associations
- Constellation: Cygnus

Berkeley 86 is a young open cluster in Cygnus. It is located inside the OB Stellar association Cyg OB 1, and obscured by a foreground dust cloud.

Star name	Effective temperature	Absolute magnitude	Bolometric magnitude	Mass (M_{☉})	Spectral type
WR 139 (V444 Cyg)	60000	-4.04	-8.3	9.3	WN5
HD 193576 B (Companion to WR 139)	42700	-5.5	-9.6	53	O6III
HD 228841	41000	-5.4	-9.3	45	O7V
HD 193595	38500	-4.9	-8.6	34	O8V
HD 228969	34700	-5	-8.4	30	O9.5V
HD 228943	31600	-5.3	-8.4	28	B0V
