= GGD 12-15 =

Star-forming region in the constellation Monoceros

Molecular cloud

Observation data: J2000.0 epoch
- Right ascension: 06^{h} 10^{m} 52.10^{s}
- Declination: −06° 12′ 47.0″
- Distance: ~3,260 ly
- Constellation: Monoceros
- Designations: [BDB2003] G213.88-11.83, [C2000b] 13, [KC2019] Theia 130, [KPS2012] MWSC 0779, IRAS 06084-0611, NGC 2183 Cluster

GGD 12-15 is an active star-forming region, star cluster, and molecular cloud of dust and gas approximately 3,260 light-years (ly) away within the Monoceros R2 Molecular Cloud Complex. This star-forming region was discovered in 1978 by A. Gyulbudaghian, Yu. Glushkov, and E. Denisyuk while looking for Herbig–Haro objects using data from the Palomar Sky Survey.

== Structure ==
GGD 12-15 star-forming complex that consists of 4 smaller regions designated as GGD 12, 13, 14, and 15; the complex is deeply embedded within the Monoceros R2 Molecular Cloud Complex. Notable structures within the complex include a bow shock of gas flowing out of the central star in the east, an extended emission region exhibiting weak filamentary structures in the south, and a dense cluster region with massive disk-bearing YSOs and T Tauri stars.

== Star Formation ==
This dense cluster region contains two prominent stars: a massive B-type YSO and a Herbig Be star. The dense cluster has an overall median age of ~4 million years while the massive YSO and the compact cometary H II region are young and have median ages of ~1 million years. The compact comentary H II region designated as G213.880-11.837 is located in GGD 14 which is the core of the complex and has been expanding and excited by a B0.5 zero-age main sequence (ZAMS) star while another object designated VLA 7 is the powering source of the molecular outflow that extends ~6 arcminutes from southeast to northwest. The molecular outflow is covering a molecular clump that created VLA 7. The surrounding molecular outflow and H2 emission knots may also have been produced by the B0.5 ZAMS star. Star-forming activity in these molecular clouds is proven by the detection of 76 infrared point sources and 5 protostars. Observations of the CO¹⁸O emission line reveals that the molecular clump extends over ~2 pc and has a mass of 2,850 M_{☉}. The molecular outflow covers this clump through its blueshifted and redshifted lobes; these lobes have masses of 11.7 M_{☉} and 10.6 M_{☉} respectively. A study found that the dense cluster region has about 100 disk-bearing YSOs, with half of them displaying variable star properties. Another study found 90 X-ray sources with infrared sources; 30 of the X-ray sources were previously known and 39 possible X-ray sources.
