= HD 21389 =

Star in the constellation Camelopardalis

- Location of CE Camelopardalis (circled)

Observation data Epoch J2000 Equinox J2000
- Constellation: Camelopardalis
- Right ascension: 03^{h} 29^{m} 54.74360^{s}
- Declination: +58° 52′ 43.4969″
- Apparent magnitude (V): 4.54

Characteristics
- Evolutionary stage: Blue supergiant
- Spectral type: A0 Iae
- U−B color index: −0.11
- B−V color index: +0.56
- Variable type: α Cyg

Astrometry
Radial velocity (R_{v})	−6.20 km/s
Proper motion (μ)	RA: −2.247 mas/yr Dec.: −0.657 mas/yr
Parallax (π)	0.9303±0.1190 mas
Distance	approx. 3,500 ly (approx. 1,100 pc)
Absolute magnitude (M_{V})	−7.20

Details
Mass	19.3 M_{☉}
Radius	97 R_{☉}
Luminosity	55,000 L_{☉}
Surface gravity (log g)	1.75 cgs
Temperature	9,730 K
Rotational velocity (v sin i)	25 km/s
Age	11 Myr

Other designations
- CE Camelopardalis, BD+58°607, HIP 16281, HR 1040, HD 21389, SAO 24061

Database references
SIMBAD	data

Data sources:

Hipparcos Catalogue, CCDM (2002), Bright Star Catalogue (5th rev. ed.)

HD 21389 is a supergiant variable star in reflection nebula VdB 15, in the constellation Camelopardalis. It has the variable star designation CE Camelopardalis, abbreviated CE Cam. It is a magnitude 4.5 star, and is visible to the naked eye. This object is part of the Camelopardalis OB1 association. The near-identical member CS Camelopardalis lies half a degree to the north.

Since 1943, the spectrum of CE Cam has served as one of the stable anchor points by which other stars are classified. In 1983, John R. Percy and Douglas L. Welch announced their discovery that HD 21389 is a variable star. It was given its variable star designation in 1997.

CE Camelopardalis is some 19 times as massive as the Sun and 55,000 times as luminous. Hohle and colleagues, using the parallax, extinction and analysis of spectrum, came up with a mass 14.95±0.41 times that and luminosity 62,679 times that of the Sun.

CE Cam is embedded in a large dusty molecular cloud, part of which it illuminates as a reflection nebula (vdB15 or BFS 29). This is a region of ongoing star formation with stars aged from one to a hundred million years old. CE Cam itself is thought to be around 11 million years old, long enough to have exhausted its core hydrogen and evolved away from the main sequence into a supergiant.

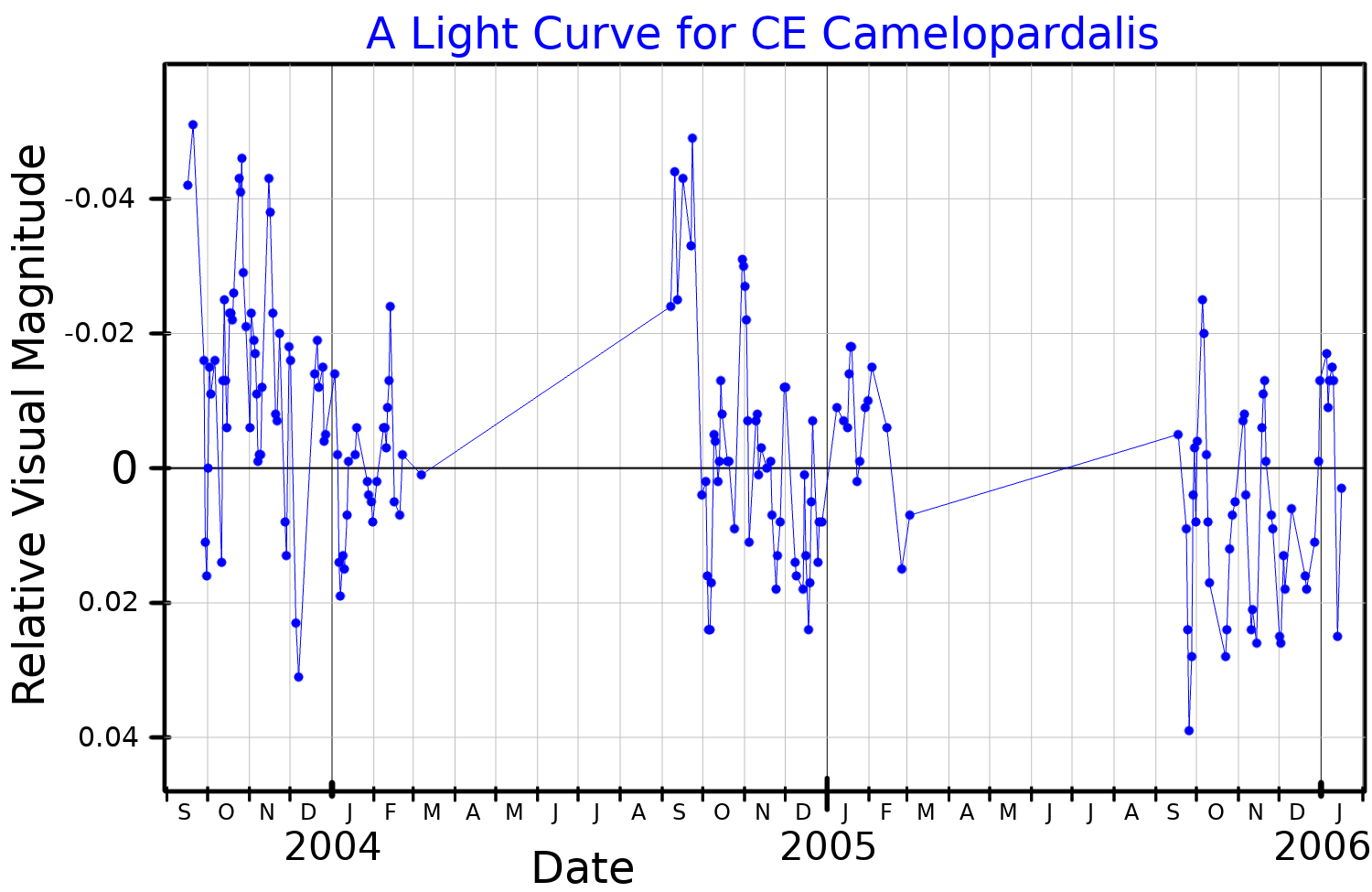
A visual band light curve for CE Camelopardalis, adapted from Corliss et al. (2015)

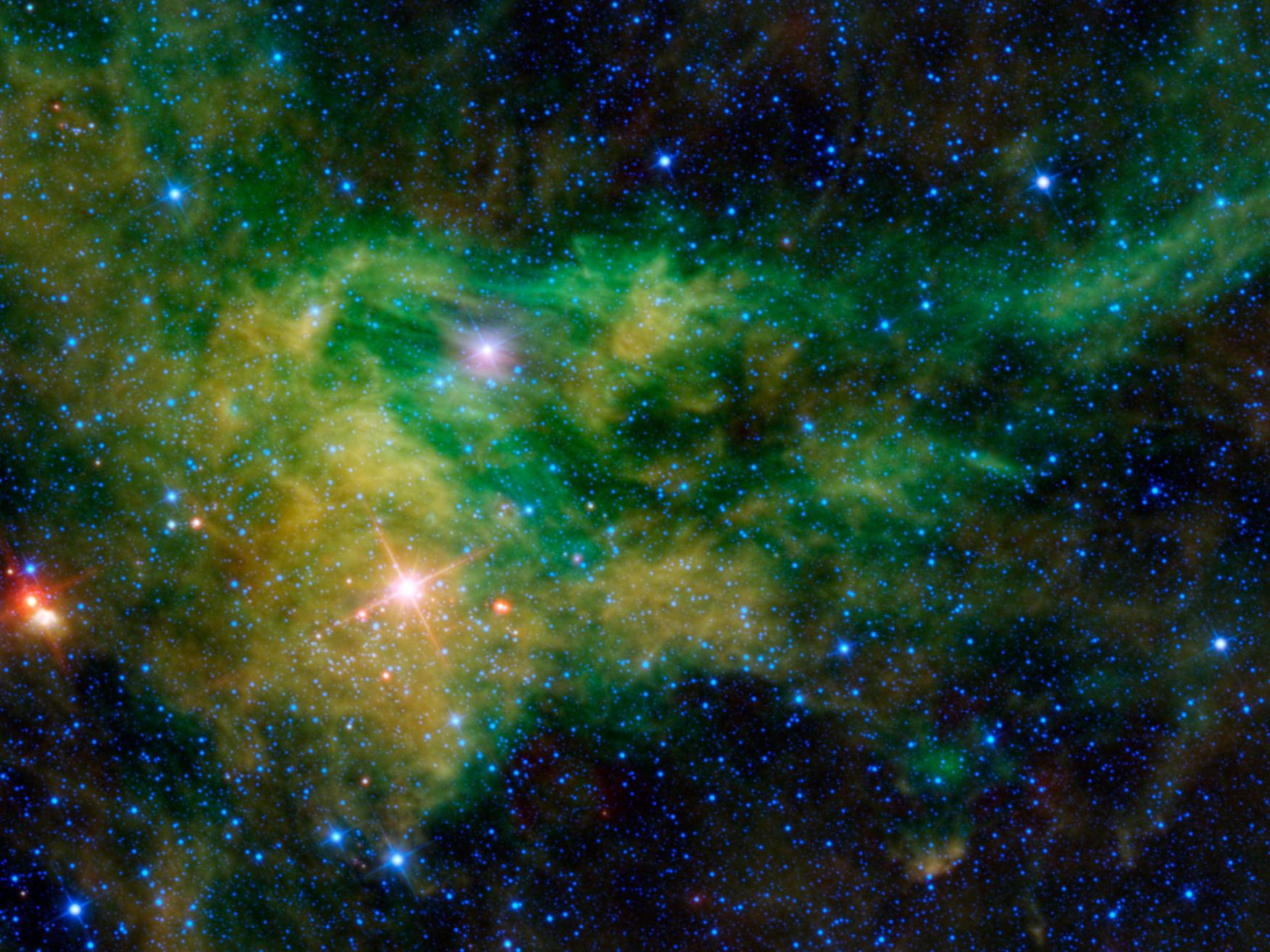
CE Cam and the surrounding nebulosity at infrared wavelengths (Credit: NASA/JPL-Caltech/UCLA)
