= CS Camelopardalis =

Binary star in the constellation Camelopardalis

- Location of CS Camelopardalis (circled)

Observation data Epoch J2000 Equinox ICRS
- Constellation: Camelopardalis
- A
- Right ascension: 03^{h} 29^{m} 04.13196^{s}
- Declination: +59° 56′ 25.1970″
- Apparent magnitude (V): 4.22 (4.19 - 4.23)
- B
- Right ascension: 03^{h} 29^{m} 04.22561^{s}
- Declination: +59° 56′ 25.9860″
- Apparent magnitude (V): 7.75

Characteristics

A
- Spectral type: B9 Ia
- U−B color index: −0.23
- B−V color index: +0.41
- Variable type: α Cyg

B
- Spectral type: B2III

Astrometry

A
| Radial velocity (R_{v}) | −5.10 km/s |
| Proper motion (μ) | RA: −2.751 mas/yr Dec.: −1.066 mas/yr |
| Parallax (π) | 1.0527±0.1311 mas |
| Distance | approx. 3,100 ly (approx. 900 pc) |
| Absolute magnitude (M_{V}) | −7.10 |

B
| Proper motion (μ) | RA: −1.702 mas/yr Dec.: −0.646 mas/yr |
| Parallax (π) | 0.9642±0.0601 mas |
| Distance | 3,400 ± 200 ly (1,040 ± 60 pc) |

Details
| Mass | 19 M_{☉} |
| Radius | 85.7 R_{☉} |
| Luminosity | 75,900 L_{☉} |
| Surface gravity (log g) | 1.65 cgs |
| Temperature | 10,800 K |
| Rotational velocity (v sin i) | 30 km/s |
| Age | 16.5 Myr |

Other designations
- ADS 2544, BD+59°660, CCDM 03291+5956, GC 4113, HD 21291, HIP 16228, HR 1035, SAO 24054, WDS J03291+5956

Database references
| SIMBAD | data |

Data sources:

Hipparcos Catalogue, CCDM (2002), Bright Star Catalogue (5th rev. ed.)

CS Camelopardalis (CS Cam; HD 21291) is a binary star in reflection nebula VdB 14, in the constellation Camelopardalis. It is a 4th magnitude star, and is visible to the naked eye under good observing conditions.

It forms a group of stars known as the Camelopardalis R1 association, part of the Cam OB1 association. The near-identical supergiant CE Camelopardalis is located half a degree to the south.

As a binary star, CS Cam is designated as Struve 385 (STF 385, Σ385).

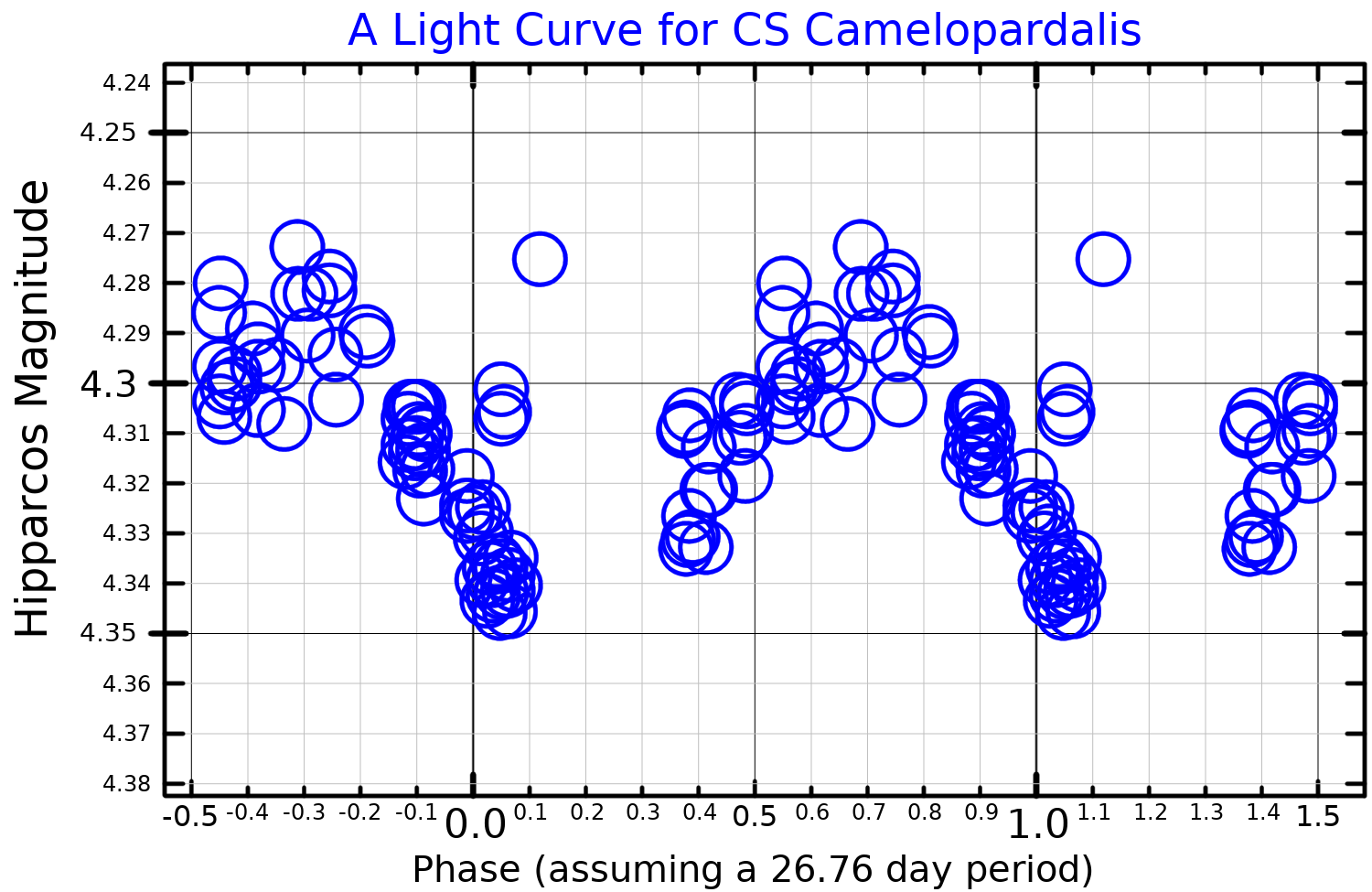
A light curve for CS Camelopardalis, adapted from Morel et al. (2004)

The primary component, CS Camelopardalis A, is a blue-white B-type supergiant with a mean apparent magnitude of 4.21^{m}. The star was found to be a variable star when the Hipparcos data was analyzed. It was given its variable star designation in 1999. It is classified as an Alpha Cygni type variable star and its brightness varies from magnitude 4.19^{m} to 4.23^{m}. Its companion, CS Camelopardalis B, is a magnitude 8.7^{m} blue giant star located 2.4 arcseconds from the primary.
