= GSH 238+00+09 =

Superbubble in the Orion Arm

Nebula
- Superbubble

Observation data: J2000 epoch
- Right ascension: 07^{h} 39^{m} 35.91^{s}
- Declination: −22° 09′ 11.3″
- Distance: ~2,600 ly

Physical characteristics
- Radius: ~717,543 or ~913,237 ly

GSH 238+00+09 is a nearby massive bubble located in the Orion Arm. This superbubble was discovered by astronomer Carl Heiles in 1998 and is one of the largest structures near the Solar System. In astronomical literature, the superbubble is usually referred to as the Vela Supershell.

== General Information ==
GSH 238+00+09 is a superbubble that was formed by ~200 supernovae 300 Myr ago from the Messier 6 family, Alpha Persei family, Cr 135 family, Cr 121 family, Sco–Cen association, and the Tau–Aur association. The superbubble has an elliptical shape with a HI hole centered at l≈235°, it is also among the most energetic structures of its kind in the Milky Way. GSH 238+00+09 connects to the Local Bubble via a tunnel and separates the Radcliffe Wave and Vela Ridge Cloud from each other. This separation creates a massive cavity where the Gum Nebula and Eridanus Loop expanded, while the shock waves formed by the superbubble triggered the formation of Star-forming regions like the Orion–Eridanus Superbubble and Monoceros R2. The radius of GSH 238+00+09 is approximately 220 or 280 kpc. GSH 238+00+09 also influences the elongation of the Local Bubble by producing a deficiency of neutral matter towards l≈230°.

GSH 238+00+09 has a calculated oort constant of 12.7 km s⁻¹ kpc⁻¹ from the streaming motions in the individual clouds. Using the calculated oort constant and calculated velocity local standard of rest (VSLR) of ~9 km s⁻¹, a study gave a distance of ~0.8 kpc in the galactic plane and a angular radius ~16°. The H I brightness temperature in the hole is 8 K. The swept-up mass (Including He) of ~2.7 x 10⁶ M_{☉} and the energy required to produce the hole being approximately ~3.4 x 10⁵² ergs provides a kinematic age of ~21 Myr. This makes GSH 238+00+09 rank as one of the major galactic superbubbles and is 10 times more massive than the nearby Orion–Eridanus Superbubble.

The relation between star cluster family Cr 135 and GSH 238+00+09 is supported by the calculated dynamical age of 29.4 Myr, which requires 96 supernovae to from GSH 238+00+09 in that time frame, this agrees with the age of the Cr 135 family which is approximately 21.7 Myr. Ten clusters in the Messier 6 family was responsible for producing 28 SNe in 15 Myr, while the Alpha Persei family along with the Sco–Cen association and Tau–Aur association produced ~15 SNe. The total of supernovae needed is estimated to be ~200.
