= Perceptions of religious imagery in natural phenomena =

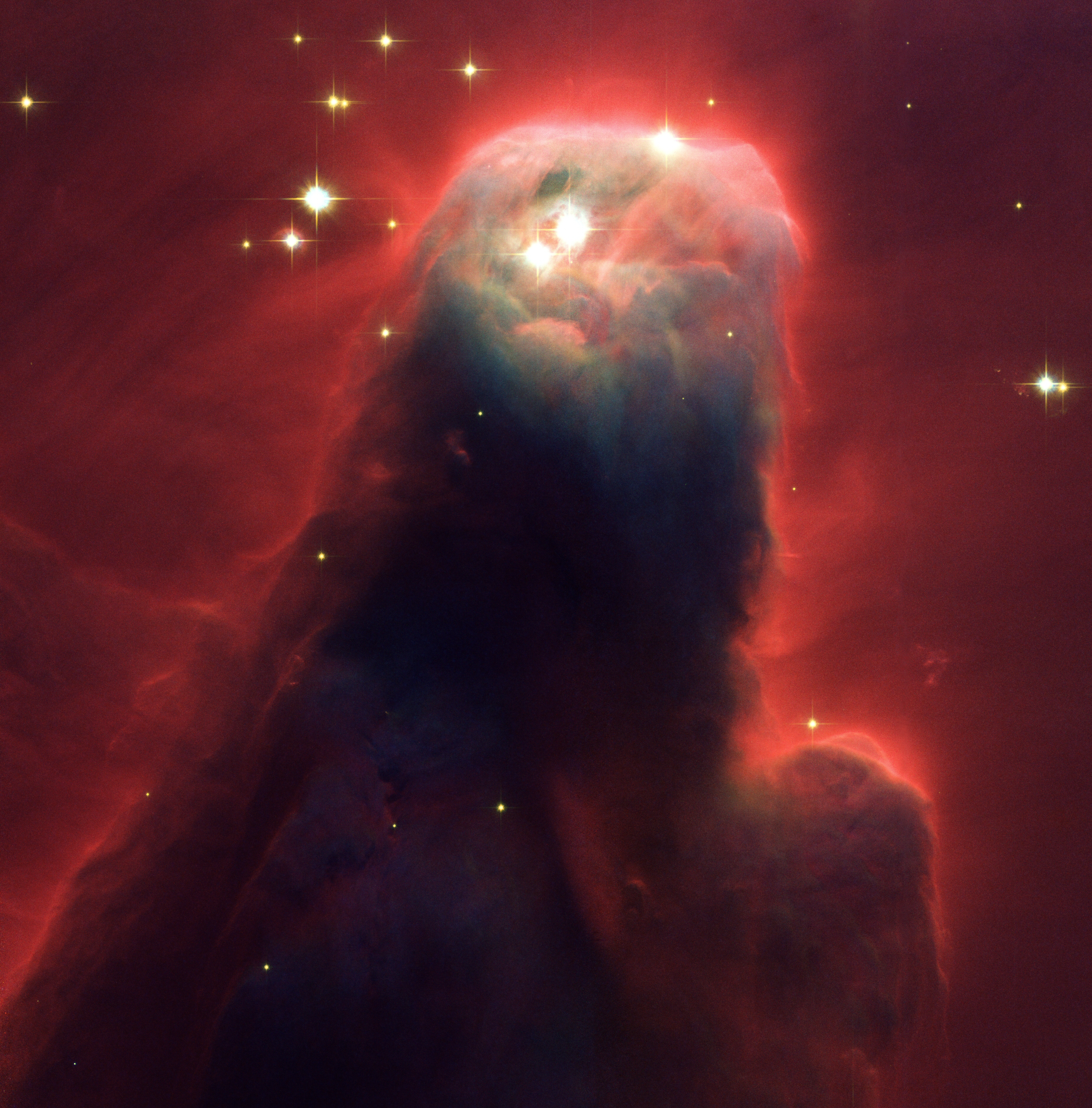
The Cone Nebula, sometimes referred to as the Jesus Christ Nebula because of its resemblance to the popular depictions of Jesus with his hands in a prayer position

People have been found to perceive images with spiritual or religious themes or import, sometimes called iconoplasms or simulacra, in the shapes of natural phenomena. The images perceived, whether iconic or aniconic, may be the faces of religious notables or the manifestation of spiritual symbols in the natural, organic media or phenomena of the natural world. The occurrence or event of perception may be transient or fleeting or may be more enduring and monumental. The phenomenon appears to approach a cultural universal and may often accompany nature worship, animism, and fetishism, along with more formal or organized belief systems.

Within Christian traditions, many instances reported involve images of Jesus or other Christian figures seen in food; in the Muslim world, structures in food and other natural objects may be perceived as religious text in Arabic script, particularly the word Allah or verses from the Qur'an. Many religious believers view them as real manifestations of miraculous origin; a skeptical view is that such perceptions are examples of pareidolia.

The original phenomena of this type were acheropites: images of major Christian icons such as Jesus and the Virgin Mary that were believed to have been created by supernatural means. The word acheropite comes from the Greek ἀχειροποίητος, meaning "not created by human hands", and the term was first applied to the Turin Shroud and the Veil of Veronica. Later, the term came to apply more generally to simulacra of a religious or spiritual nature occurring in natural phenomena, particularly those seen by believers as being of miraculous origin.

== Explanations ==
=== Pareidolia ===
Scientifically, such imagery is generally characterized as a form of pareidolia. This is a false perception of imagery due to what is theorized as the human mind's over-sensitivity to perceiving patterns, particularly the pattern of a human face, in otherwise random phenomena.

It is suggested that a tendency of religious imagery in Islam to be perceived as Arabic words is made more likely by the general simplicity of letter forms in the Arabic alphabet (especially in the everyday Riq'a); a tradition of massive typographical flexibility in Islamic calligraphy; and the particular shape of the word Allah (الله). These factors make the word easy to read into many structures with parallel lines or lobes on a common base.

=== C. S. Lewis ===
The author C. S. Lewis wrote about the implications of perception of religious imagery in questionable circumstances on issues of religious belief and faith. He argued that people's ready ability to perceive human-like forms around them reflects a religious reality that human existence is immersed in a world containing such beings. The principal reason he believed in religion was because he believed himself to be wired to believe it, just as he believed human beings are wired to perceive inference (if ... then) and other mental logical phenomena as representing truths about the external world that can be learned from, rather than representing purely internal phenomena to be characterized as error. He chose to believe in his wiring for religious perception in the same way and for the same reasons that he chose to believe in his wiring for logic, choosing to use and rely on both as guides to learning about the world rather than regarding them as purely random in origin and discarding them. People continue to have faith in the phenomenon of logic, despite the fact that they sometimes make demonstrably mistaken inferences.

=== Perceiver as cultural filter ===
From an etic perspective, perception of an image, icon, or sign of religious or spiritual import to the perceiver is indelibly mediated or filtered through culture, politics, and worldview. As Gregory Price Grieve states:

What you see is not always what you get. Instead, what we see depends on mediation. That is, because our descriptions of religious images are culturally located, our "naïve" descriptions are neither innocent nor objective. Rather, all social objects are mediated by intervening socially grounded, culturally generated, and historically particular mechanisms. Moreover, these intervening mechanisms are not only by necessity material, but are marbled through and through with power relations.

Psychology of the sacred, taking stock of the human condition, conveys that people construct meaning from that which is without meaning; stated differently, culture gives context to lived experience. Therefore, both meaning and absence of meaning may be perceived as being co-existents. Cultural context as constructed meaning and memetic transmission engenders social, existential, and spiritual comfort in a tenuous and arbitrary lived experience and milieu: perception as a participatory event parsing experience into meaningful units. The crossroads or intersections of evolutionary psychology of religion, pattern recognition, neuroaesthetics and symbolic communication lend to the construction of meanings as group cohesion and bond-forming in human society.

== Examples ==
=== Christianity ===
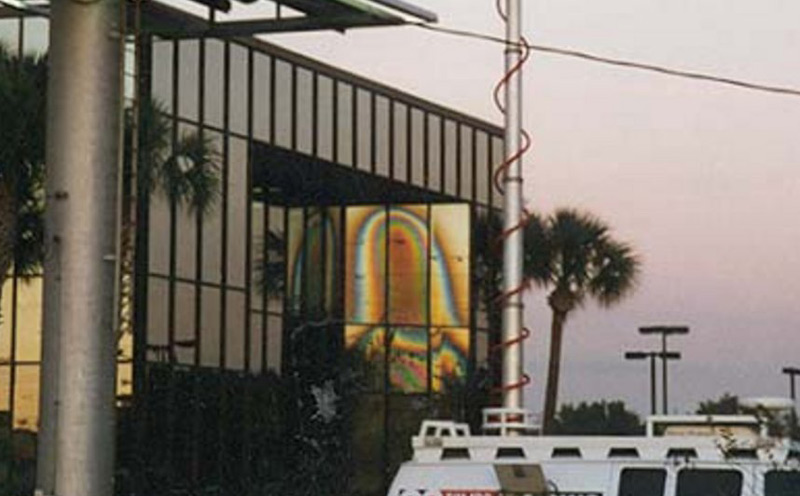
The Clearwater Virgin on Christmas Day 1996

The Virgin Mary accounts for many sightings of this type. A typical example is the "Clearwater Virgin", an image of Mary which was reported to have appeared in the glass façade of a finance building in Clearwater, Florida, and attracted widespread media attention. The building drew an estimated one million visitors over the next several years and was purchased by an Ohio Catholic revivalism group. A local chemist examined the windows and suggested the stain was produced by water deposits combined with weathering, yielding a chemical reaction like that often seen on old bottles, perhaps due to the action of the water sprinkler. On March 1, 2004, the three uppermost panes of the window were broken by a vandal. Other Marian apparitions of this type that have received substantial press coverage include a fence in Coogee, Australia in 2003; a hospital in Milton, Massachusetts in June 2003; and a felled tree in Passaic, New Jersey in 2003. Images of the Virgin have also been reported on a rock in Ghana, an underpass in Chicago, a lump of firewood in Janesville, Wisconsin; a chocolate factory in Fountain Valley, California; and a pizza pan in Houston, Texas. A grilled cheese sandwich, a pretzel and a pebble said to resemble images of the Virgin Mary have been offered for sale on Internet auction sites, the former being purchased by Internet casino GoldenPalace.com, which is known for its publicity stunts.

Another image often reported is that of Jesus Christ. Sightings of this type have been reported in such varied media as cloud photos, Marmite, chapatis, shadows, Cheetos, tortillas, trees, dental x-rays, cooking utensils, windows, rocks and stones, painted and plastered walls, and dogs' hindquarters. Again, some of these items have been offered for sale on Internet auction sites, and a number have been bought by the Golden Palace casino. When such images receive publicity, people frequently come considerable distances to see them, and to venerate them.

On April 30, 2002 the Hubble Space Science Institute released new photographs of the Cone Nebula, also known as the Space Mountain, to showcase a new extremely high resolution camera. Shortly afterwards some began to call it the "Jesus Nebula", believing they could see Jesus's face in it. The new camera was installed on Hubble by astronauts during a Space Shuttle mission in March 2002. The Cone Nebula, located in the constellation Monoceros, is a region that contains cones, pillars, and majestic flowing shapes that abound in stellar nurseries where natal clouds of gas and dust are buffeted by energetic winds from nurseries of newborn stars.

One controversial incident that received considerable publicity was when the face of Mother Teresa was claimed to have been identified in a cinnamon bun at Bongo Java in Nashville, Tennessee on 15 October 1996. Dubbed the "Nun Bun" by the press, it was turned into an enterprise by the company, selling T-shirts and mugs, which led to an exchange of letters between the company and Mother Teresa's representatives. On 25 December 2005 the bun was stolen during a break-in at the coffee house.

This phenomenon can even take political meanings, such as the cross-shaped reflection seen on the East Berlin TV Tower, nicknamed "the Pope's revenge" and cited by Ronald Reagan as an example of the survival of religious ideas in the secular Communist society.

In at least two instances, the images of deceased Anglican clergymen allegedly appeared on the walls of their church. In 1902, the image of a Dean Vaughan allegedly appeared on the walls of Llandaff Cathedral, while the image of Dean Henry Liddell allegedly appeared on the walls of Christ Church, Oxford in 1923.

Another example, either a miraculous sign or a face recognition pareidolia, originated in the fire at Notre Dame Cathedral, when a few observers claimed to see Jesus in the flames.

=== Islam ===
In the Muslim community, a frequently-reported religious perception is the image of the word "Allah" in Arabic on natural objects. Again, the discovery of such an object may attract considerable interest among believers who visit the object for the purpose of prayer or veneration. Examples of this phenomenon have been reported on fish, fruit and vegetables, plants and clouds, eggs, honeycombs, and on the markings on animals' coats.

The Arabic script for the name of Allah is purported to be visible in a satellite photograph of the 2004 Asian tsunami. This was taken as evidence by some Muslims that Allah had sent the tsunami as punishment.

=== Hinduism ===
Several Hindu murtis are held to be "self-manifest" or Swayambhu. Most are lingams of Shiva.

In Jurong West, Singapore in September 2007, the discovery of calluses on a tree which look like the Hanuman, the monkey deity in the Hindu pantheon, created a social phenomenon. There are two nearby trees which also resemble deities. One features an apparent outline of Guan Yin, the goddess of mercy, and another resembles the Hindu elephant god Ganesha.

== Created depictions ==
In some cases, apparent religious images have been deliberately created from natural materials as part of an artistic endeavor or investigation into the phenomenon of perceptions of religious imagery. The "Pope Tart" was a hoax apparition created by Karen Stollznow in 2005 as part of an investigation into pareidolia for The Skeptic in Australia. In other cases these deliberate images have been commercial ventures. The Jesus Toaster and The Virgin Mary Toaster were created by Galen Dively in 2010. These toasters create images of Jesus and Mary on bread.

== See also ==
- Bélmez Faces, a phenomenon in Bélmez, Spain, where several spots on floors and walls are interpreted as faces.
- Marian apparition
- Weeping statue
- Pareidolia
- Agent detection
- Dual process theory
