= NGC 1444 =

Small open cluster in the constellation Perseus

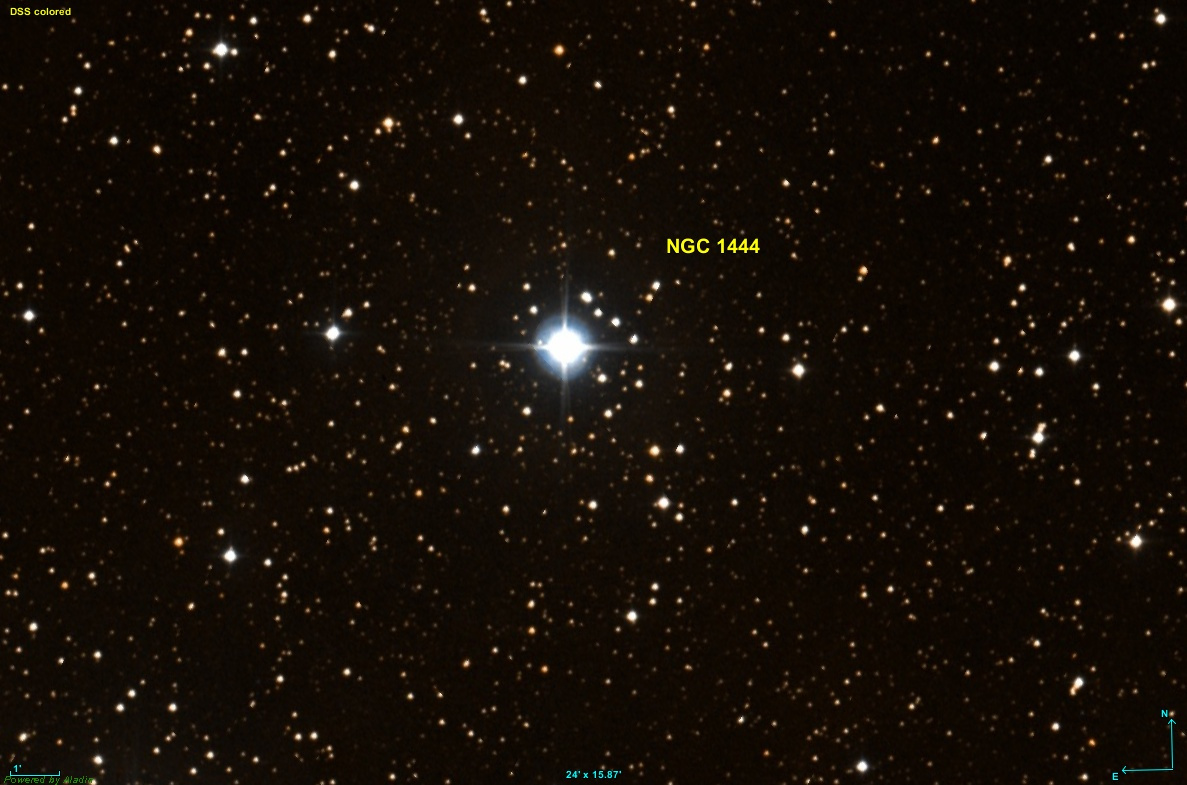
- NGC 1444 imaged by the Sloan Digital Sky Survey

Observation data (J2000 epoch)
- Right ascension: 03^{h} 49^{m} 23.8^{s}
- Declination: +52° 29′ 24″
- Distance: 4.2 kly (1.3 kpc)
- Apparent magnitude (V): 6.6
- Apparent dimensions (V): 4′

Physical characteristics
- Estimated age: 7.08 Myr
- Other designations: Cr 43, C 0345+525, OCL 394

Associations
- Constellation: Perseus

NGC 1444 is a small open cluster of stars in the northern constellation of Perseus, about 2-1/4° to the northwest of 43 Persei. It has an angular diameter of 4 arcminutes and a brightness of 6.60 in visual magnitude. The cluster has sixty members of seventh magnitude or fainter, and is better appreciated in larger telescopes. NGC 1444 was discovered on 18 December 1788 by the German-British astronomer William Herschel. It is located at a distance of 4,200 light-years from the Sun and is about 7.1 million years old. The cluster has a physical core radius of 1.73 ± 0.42 ly and a tidal radius of 17.4 ± 4.2 ly. The most prominent member is the triple star system Σ446, with a magnitude 6.7 primary. The cluster is a member of the Camelopardalis OB1 association.
