= IC 447 =

Reflection nebula in the constellation of Monoceros

Dreyer's Nebula
Reflection nebula
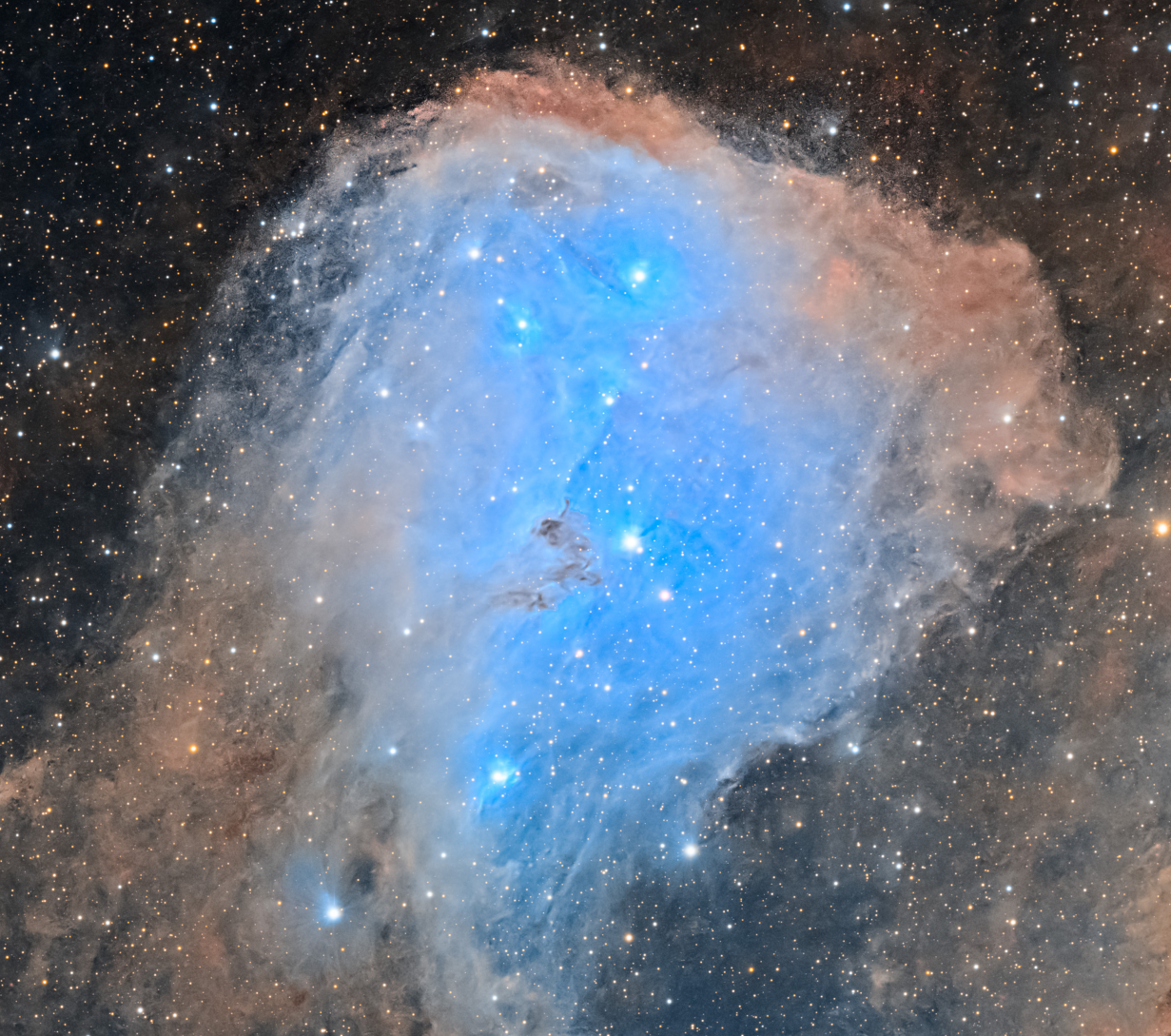
- This is IC 447. The dark nebula near the center is cataloged as IC 2169.

Observation data: J2000 epoch
- Right ascension: 06^{h} 31^{m} 12.0^{s}
- Declination: +10° 02′ 00″
- Apparent dimensions (V): ~25 arcminutes dia.
- Constellation: Monoceros

Physical characteristics
- Radius: 0.25 x 0.9 ly
- Designations: Dreyer's Nebula, IC 447, IC 2169

IC 447 is a reflection nebula located in the constellation Monoceros. It includes several massive B-type stars and forms one end of the Monoceros R1 Molecular Cloud, with IC 446 at the opposite end. IC 447 may have been formed by more massive members of the young open cluster Collinder 95.
