= Fox Fur Nebula =

Nebula in the constellation Monoceros

Emission nebula
- H II region
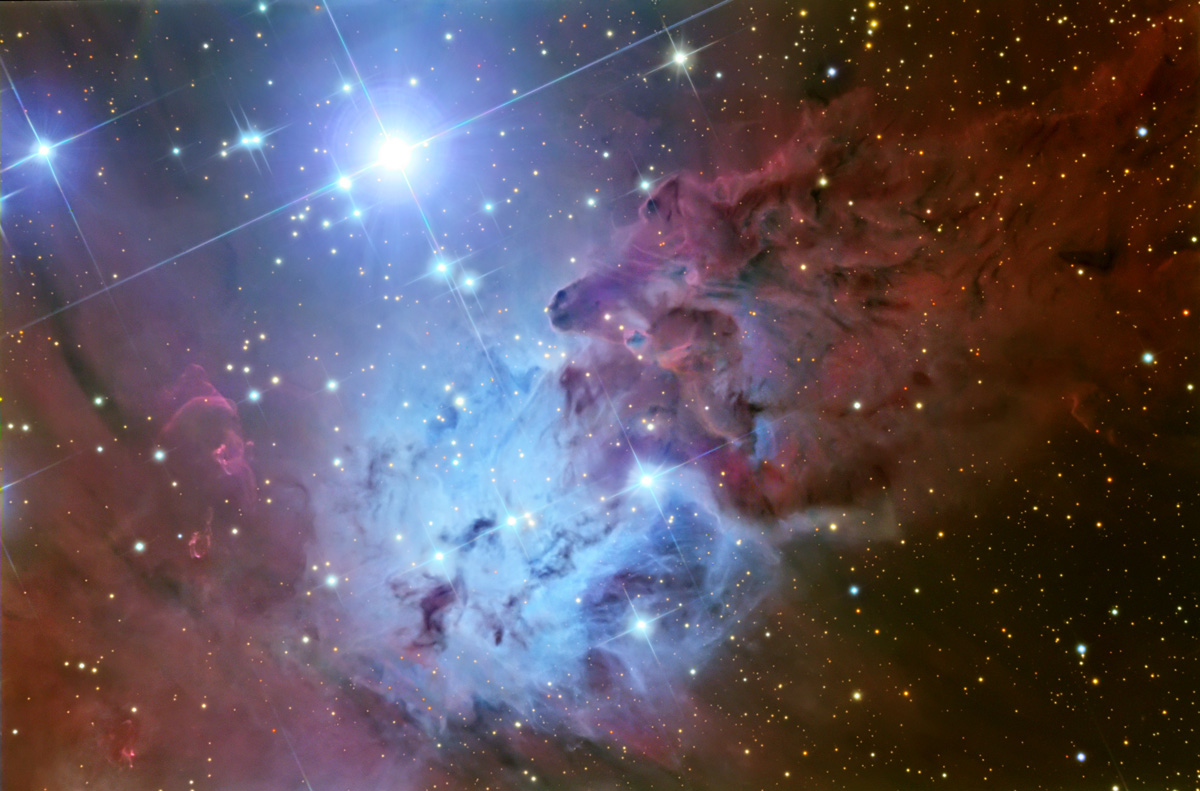
- Fox Fur Nebula taken from the Mount Lemmon SkyCenter Schulman Telescope

Observation data: J2000 epoch
- Subtype: Diffuse + Dark
- Distance: 2,700 ly
- Constellation: Monoceros
- Designations: NGC 2264, Sh2-273

The Fox Fur Nebula is a nebula (a formation of gas and dust) located in the constellation of Monoceros (the Unicorn) not far off the right arm of Orion and included in the NGC 2264 Region. In the Sharpless catalog it is number 273.

The image is a close-up of a small section of a much larger complex, generally known as the Christmas Tree cluster. The Cone Nebula is also a part of this same cloud.

The red regions of this nebula are caused by hydrogen gas that has been stimulated to emit its own light by the copious ultraviolet radiation coming from the hot, blue stars of the cluster. The blue areas shine by a different process: they are mainly dust clouds that reflect the bluish light of the same stars.

Its popular name arises because the nebula looks like the head of a stole made from the fur of a red fox.
