= S Monocerotis =

Star in the constellation Monoceros

- S Monocerotis lies in NGC 2264

Observation data Epoch J2000 Equinox ICRS
- Constellation: Monoceros
- A
- Right ascension: 06^{h} 40^{m} 58.656^{s}
- Declination: +09° 53′ 44.71″
- Apparent magnitude (V): 4.62 - 4.68 (Aa); 5.90 (Ab)
- B
- Right ascension: 06^{h} 40^{m} 58.566^{s}
- Declination: +09° 53′ 42.20″
- Apparent magnitude (V): 7.830

Characteristics
- Spectral type: O7V((f))zvar + O9.5Vn + B2V
- U−B color index: −1.034
- B−V color index: −0.261
- Variable type: Ia

Astrometry

A
Radial velocity (R_{v})	22.00 km/s
Proper motion (μ)	RA: −2.61 mas/yr Dec.: −1.61 mas/yr
Parallax (π)	3.55±0.50 mas
Distance	720 pc
Absolute magnitude (M_{V})	−5.21

B
Proper motion (μ)	RA: −1.971 mas/yr Dec.: −4.225 mas/yr
Parallax (π)	1.4019±0.0984 mas
Distance	2,300 ± 200 ly (710 ± 50 pc)

C
Proper motion (μ)	RA: −1.464 mas/yr Dec.: −2.746 mas/yr
Parallax (π)	1.5438±0.0394 mas
Distance	2,110 ± 50 ly (650 ± 20 pc)

Orbit
Primary	Aa
Secondary	Ab
Period (P)	108±12 yr
Semi-major axis (a)	112.5±6 mas
Eccentricity (e)	0.770+0.023 −0.030
Inclination (i)	47±2°
Longitude of the node (Ω)	60±3°
Periastron epoch (T)	B 1996.05+0.15 −0.10
Argument of periastron (ω) (secondary)	63±4°

Details

Aa
Mass	39.4 M_{☉}
Radius	9.9 R_{☉}
Luminosity	214,000 L_{☉}
Surface gravity (log g)	4.5 cgs
Temperature	38,500 K
Rotational velocity (v sin i)	120 km/s

Ab
Mass	19.7 M_{☉}
Age	3.1 Myr

Other designations
- 15 Monocerotis, HD 47839, HIP 31978, HR 2456, SAO 114258, BD+10°1220

Database references
SIMBAD	data
ARICNS	data

S Monocerotis, also known as 15 Monocerotis, is a massive multiple and variable star system located in the constellation Monoceros. It is the brightest star in the Christmas Tree open cluster in the area catalogued as NGC 2264.

NGC 2264 including the Cone Nebula and the Christmas Tree Cluster (upside down in this image) with S Monocerotis at the very top of the image (and the base of the Christmas tree)

S Monocerotis is found within an open cluster and the Washington Double Star Catalog lists many companion stars. The closest and brightest is S Mon B, magnitude 7.8 and 3 arcseconds away. It is classified as B2 main sequence star with a mass of 7.31 M_{☉}. Designated component C is an 11th-magnitude B8V star. The cluster contains another dozen or so 9th and 10th magnitude stars and many fainter stars.

S Monocerotis A is a spectroscopic binary system with an eccentric orbit of about 112 years. Since 1943, the spectrum of this star has served as the MK standard for O7 by which other stars are classified. It is also an irregular variable star with a range of less than a tenth of a magnitude. The orbital parameters can be used to derive the masses of the two stars, giving 31 M_{☉} and 11 M_{☉}.

The distance to S Monocerotis and NGC 2264 has been derived in various ways, including dynamical parallax and isochrone fitting. These consistently give estimates of 700 - 900 parsecs, although this is double the likely distance derived from the Hipparcos parallax measurements. Gaia Early Data Release 3 contains parallaxes for the companions components B and C of 1.4 mas and 1.5 mas respectively, consistent with the expected distance to the cluster.
