= NGC 1491 =

Emission nebula in the constellation Perseus

Emission nebula
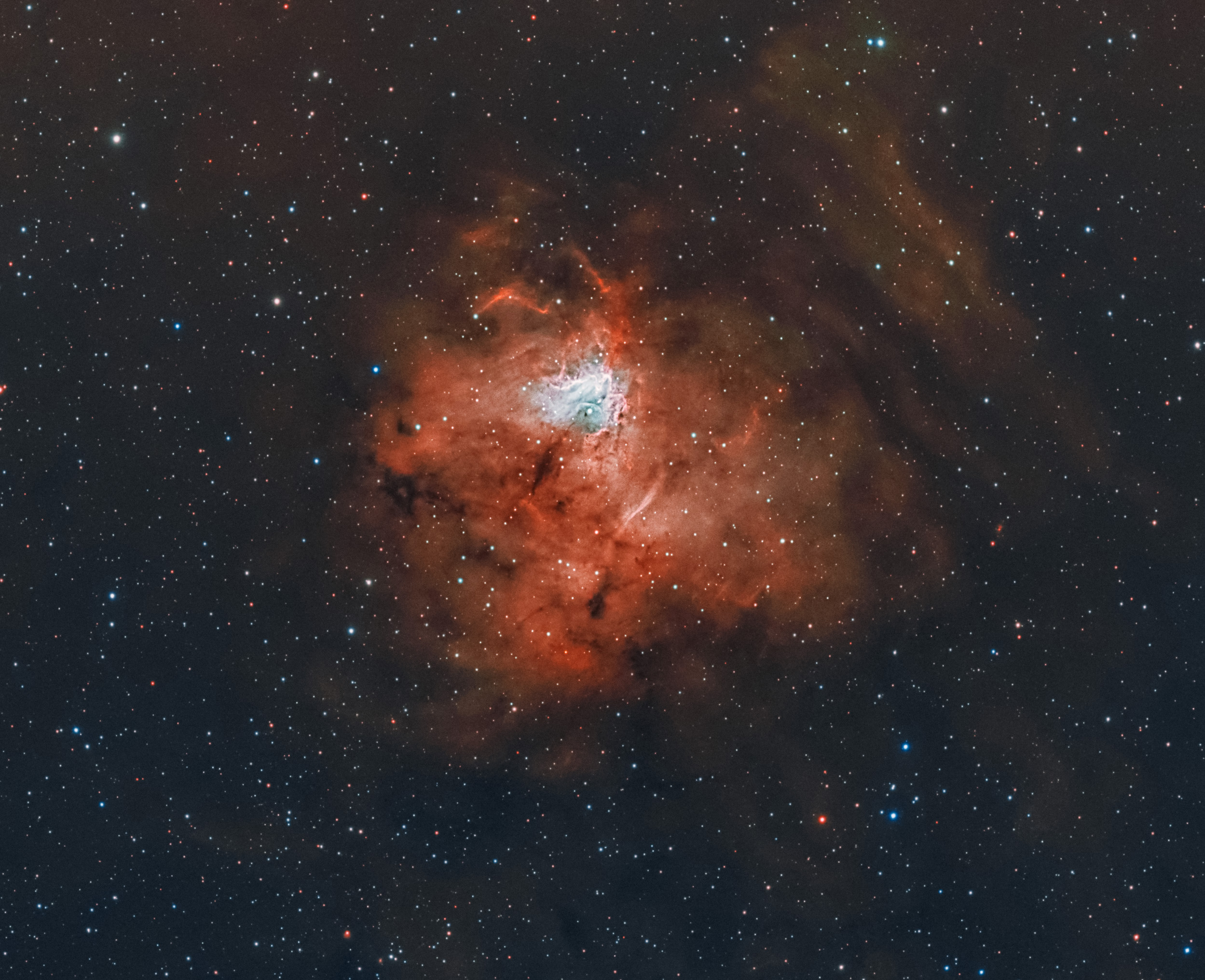
- The nebula NGC 1491

Observation data: J2000 epoch
- Subtype: H II region
- Right ascension: 04^{h} 03^{m} 15.9^{s}
- Declination: +51° 18′ 54″
- Distance: 9,800 ± 2,000 ly (3.02 ± 0.6 kpc) ly
- Apparent magnitude (V): 8.5
- Apparent dimensions (V): 6′ × 9′
- Constellation: Perseus
- Designations: Ced 25, LBN 704, LBN 706, Sharpless 2-206, Little Pacman Nebula

NGC 1491 is an emission type bright nebula in the northern constellation of Perseus. Alternatively, it is known as LBN 704, SH2-206, or the Fossil Footprint Nebula. It was discovered on 23 December 1790 by William Herschel. The nebula is located at a distance of about 9,800 light years from Earth

The nebula gets its deep red coloration due to many massive stars (such as BD+50 866) embedded within NGC 1491 producing large amounts of ultraviolet radiation and ionizing the hydrogen gas that makes up the nebula.

== Gallery ==
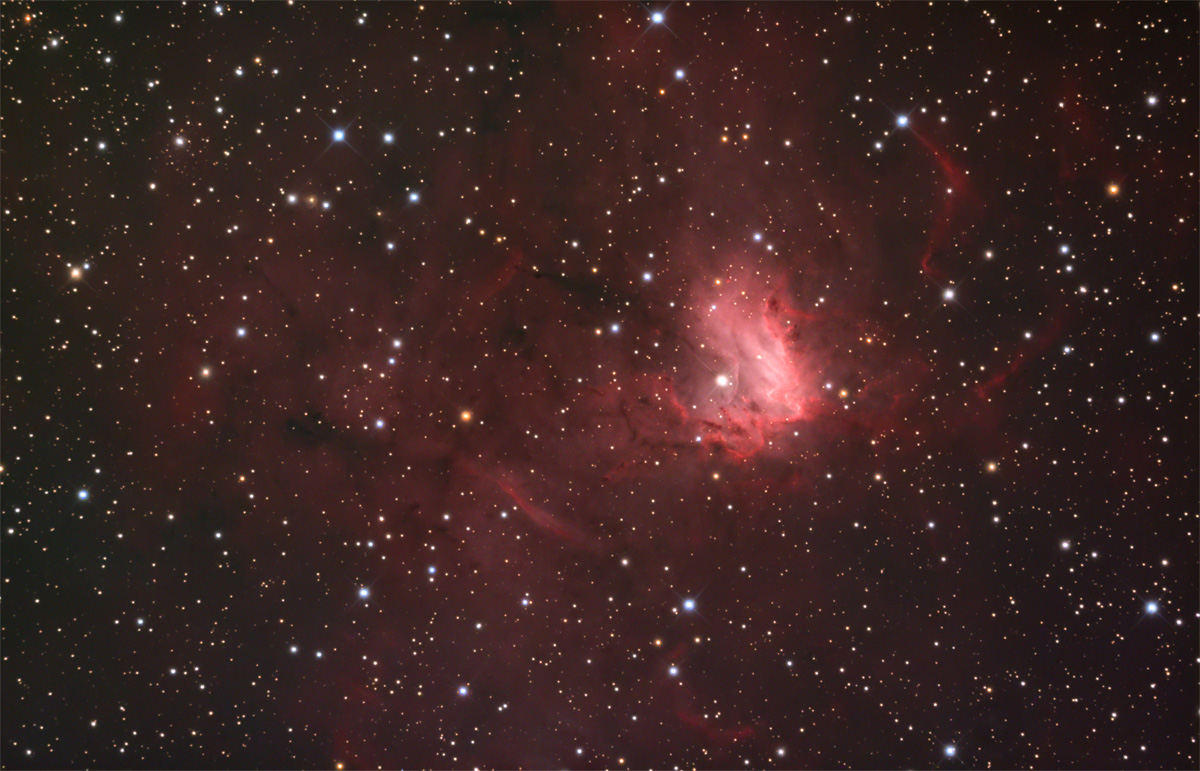
NGC 1491 from the Mount Lemmon Sky Center

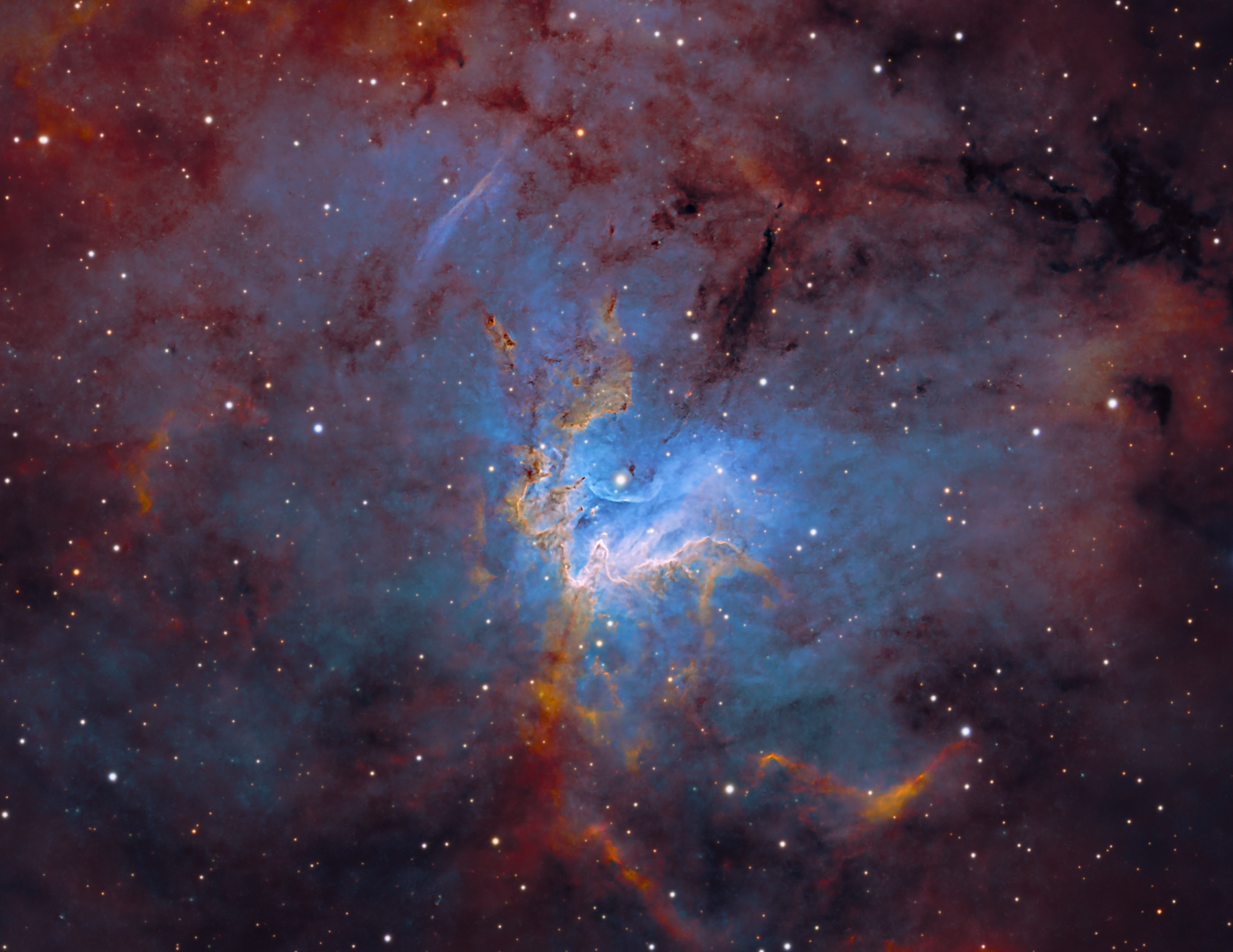
Closeup of NGC 1491 - Peter Kennett
