= NGC 1502 =

Open cluster in the constellation Camelopardalis

- The location of NGC 1502 (circled)

Observation data (J2000 epoch)
- Right ascension: 04^{h} 07^{m} 48.96^{s}
- Declination: +62° 19′ 55.2″
- Distance: 3,452 ly (1,058.4 pc); 3,643+313 −290 ly (1,117+96 −89 pc)
- Apparent magnitude (V): 6.0
- Apparent dimensions (V): 9.7′

Physical characteristics
- Radius: 5.5 ly (1.7 pc)
- Estimated age: 5 Myr
- Other designations: NGC 1502, Cr 45

Associations
- Constellation: Camelopardalis

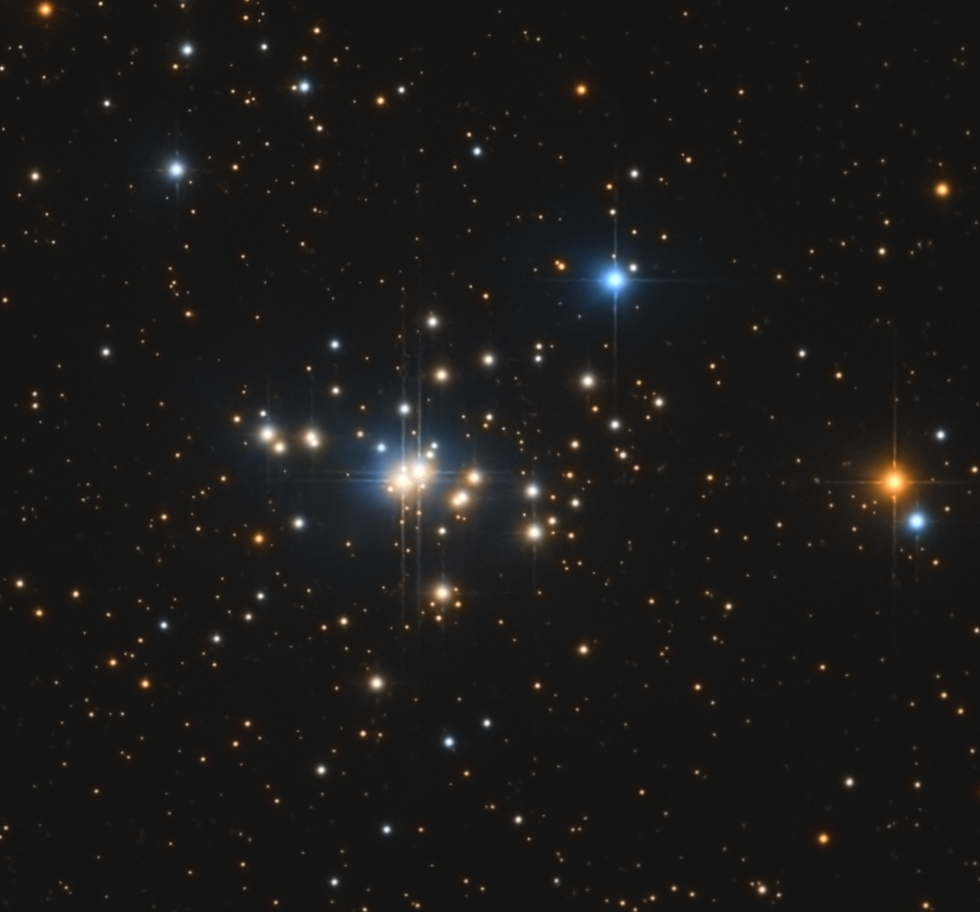
NGC 1502

NGC 1502 (also known as the Golden Harp Cluster or Jolly Roger Cluster) is a young open cluster of approximately 60 stars in the constellation Camelopardalis, discovered by William Herschel on November 3, 1787. It has a visual magnitude of 6.0 and thus is dimly visible to the naked eye. This cluster is located at a distance of approximately 3,500 light years from the Sun, at the outer edge of the Cam OB1 association of co-moving stars, and is likely part of the Orion Arm. The asterism known as Kemble's Cascade appears to "flow" into NGC 1502, but this is just a chance alignment of stars.

The Trumpler class of NGC 1502 is II3p, indicating poorly populated cluster of stars (p) with a wide brightness range (3). The main sequence turnoff point is not well-defined, so the age estimates range from five to fifteen million years. It is heavily reddened due to interstellar dust. One of the brightest candidate members of the cluster is the eclipsing binary SZ Cam, which is a component of a visual double star ADS 2984. There are eleven variable stars and four candidate variables among the cluster members, including a β Cep, two periodic B-type variables, 2–3 eclipsing variables, and an RR Lyrae star. Five members of the cluster are chemically peculiar.

== See also ==
- Alpha Camelopardalis, a runaway star possibly ejected from this cluster.
