= Gamma Monocerotis =

Star in the constellation of Monoceros

γ Monocerotis
- Location of γ Monocerotis (circled)

Observation data Epoch J2000.0 Equinox J2000.0 (ICRS)
- Constellation: Monoceros
- Right ascension: 06^{h} 14^{m} 51.33367^{s}
- Declination: −06° 16′ 29.1880″
- Apparent magnitude (V): 3.96

Characteristics
- Spectral type: K1.5IIIBa0.3
- U−B color index: +1.42
- B−V color index: +1.31

Astrometry
Radial velocity (R_{v})	−4.8±0.7 km/s
Proper motion (μ)	RA: −4.69 mas/yr Dec.: −19.30 mas/yr
Parallax (π)	6.55±0.19 mas
Distance	500 ± 10 ly (153 ± 4 pc)
Absolute magnitude (M_{V})	-1.93

Details
Mass	4.09±0.14 M_{☉}
Radius	50.8+1.5 −1.6 R_{☉}
Luminosity	1,247±96 L_{☉}
Surface gravity (log g)	1.61 cgs
Temperature	4,810±66 K
Metallicity [Fe/H]	−0.15 dex
Rotational velocity (v sin i)	4.0 km/s
Age	170±20 Myr

Other designations
- γ Mon, 5 Monocerotis, BD−06°1469, FK5 2475, GC 7986, HD 43232, HIP 29651, HR 2227, SAO 133012, CCDM J06149-0616A, WDS J06149-0617A

Database references
SIMBAD	data

γ Monocerotis, Latinised as Gamma Monocerotis, is a binary star system in the equatorial constellation of Monoceros. Based upon an annual parallax shift of 6.55 mas, it is located roughly 500 light years from the Sun. It can be viewed with the naked eye, having an apparent visual magnitude of 3.96. Gamma Monocerotis is moving away from the Sun with a radial velocity of −5 km/s.

This is an evolved K-type giant star with a stellar classification of K1.5 III Ba0.3. The Ba0.3 suffix indicates this is a mild barium star, which means the spectrum displays abnormal abundance of s-process elements, including barium. These were deposited by an orbiting companion as it passed through the asymptotic giant branch stage. The companion is now a white dwarf star.

It has reported companions B, at separation 53.7" and magnitude 13.1, and C, at separation 47.9" and magnitude 13.6.
