= NGC 2264 =

Open cluster in the constellation Monoceros

Diffuse nebula
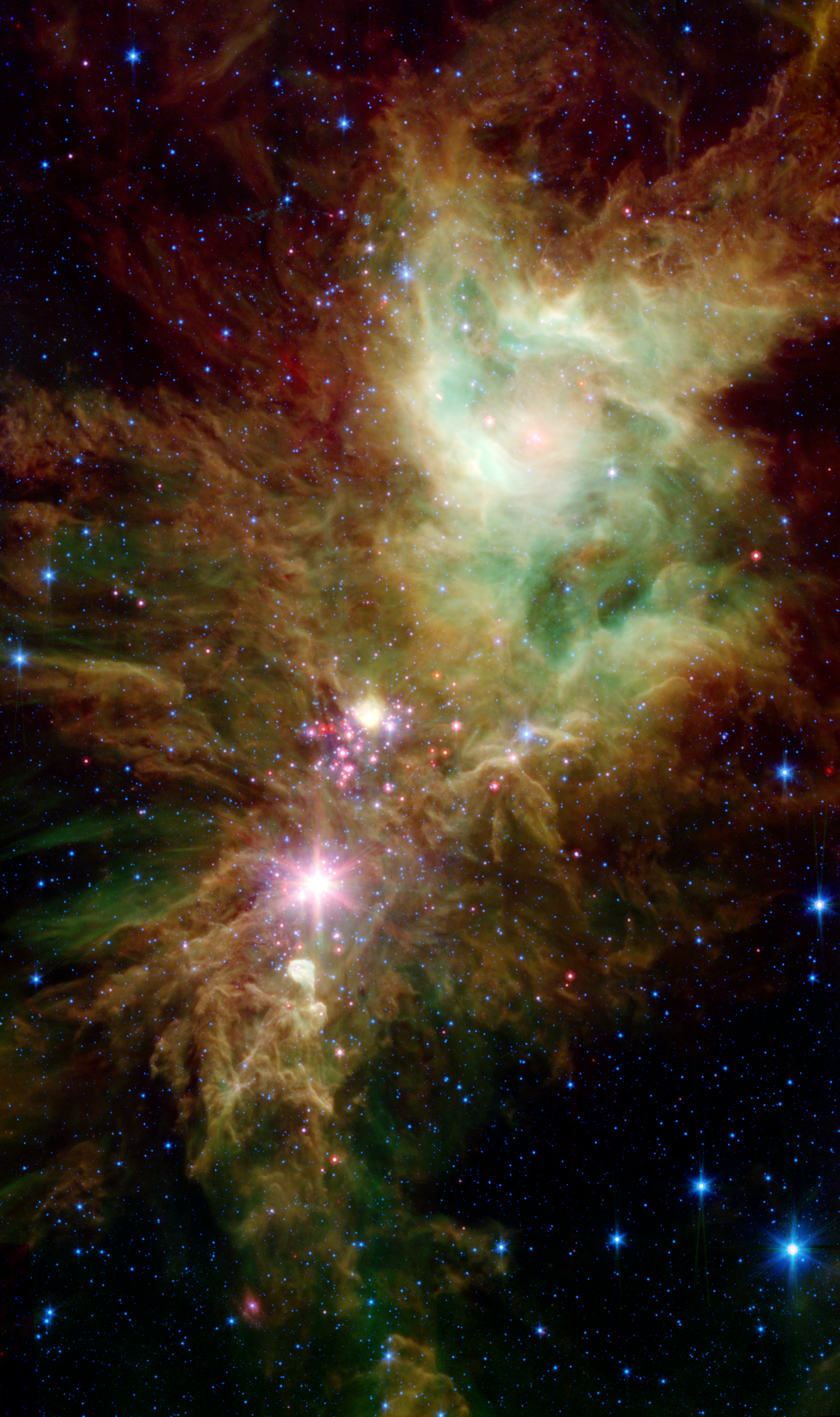
- An infrared Spitzer Space Telescope image of NGC 2264

Observation data: J2000.0 epoch
- Subtype: emission nebula
- Right ascension: 6^{h} 41^{m}
- Declination: +9° 53′
- Distance: 2,350 ± 52 ly (721 ± 16 pc) ly
- Apparent magnitude (V): 4.1
- Apparent dimensions (V): 40′
- Constellation: Monoceros
- Designations: NGC 2264, Cr 112

NGC 2264 is an open cluster of stars and an accompanying H II region, which are individually identified as the Christmas Tree Cluster and the Cone Nebula, respectively. Its name is a designation number from the New General Catalogue that identifies the two astronomical objects as a single object. Two other objects are associated with this designation but not specifically included: the Snowflake Cluster, and the Fox Fur Nebula. All of the objects are located in the constellation Monoceros and are located about 720 parsecs or 2,300 light-years from Earth. Due to its relative proximity and large size, it is extremely well-studied.

== Structure ==
NGC 2264: Cone Nebula at bottom with inverted Christmas Tree cluster above the cone; the bright star just above the cone is the tree topper and the very bright star at the top of the image (S Monocerotis) is the center of the tree trunk. The Fox Fur Nebula is at the top right corner. The Snowflake nebula is in the middle which shows up better on the infrared image. Credit ESO

NGC 2264 is the location where the Cone Nebula, the Stellar Snowflake Cluster and the Christmas Tree Cluster have formed in this emission nebula. For reference, the Stellar Snowflake Cluster is located 2,700 light years away in the constellation Monoceros.

The Snowflake Cluster was granted its name due to its unmistakable pinwheel-like shape and its assortment of bright colors. The Christmas Tree star formation consists of young stars obscured by heavy layers of dust clouds. These dust clouds, along with hydrogen and helium are producing luminous new stars. The combination of dense clouds and an array of colors creates a color map filled with varying wavelengths. As seen in the photographs taken by the Spitzer Space telescope, we are able to differentiate between young red stars and older blue stars.

With varying youthful stars comes vast changes to the overall structure of the clusters and nebula. For a cluster to be considered a Snowflake, it must remain in the original location the star was formed.

When referring to this emission nebula overall, there are several aspects that contribute to the prominent configuration of a snowflake and/or Christmas tree cluster. There is a diverse arrangement of brilliant colors, and an evolving process of structure that follow star formation in a nebula.

The ratio of brown dwarfs to stars is between 1 to 2.5 and 1 to 7.5.
