= Cone Nebula =

H II region in the constellation Monoceros

Emission nebula
- H II region
- dark nebula
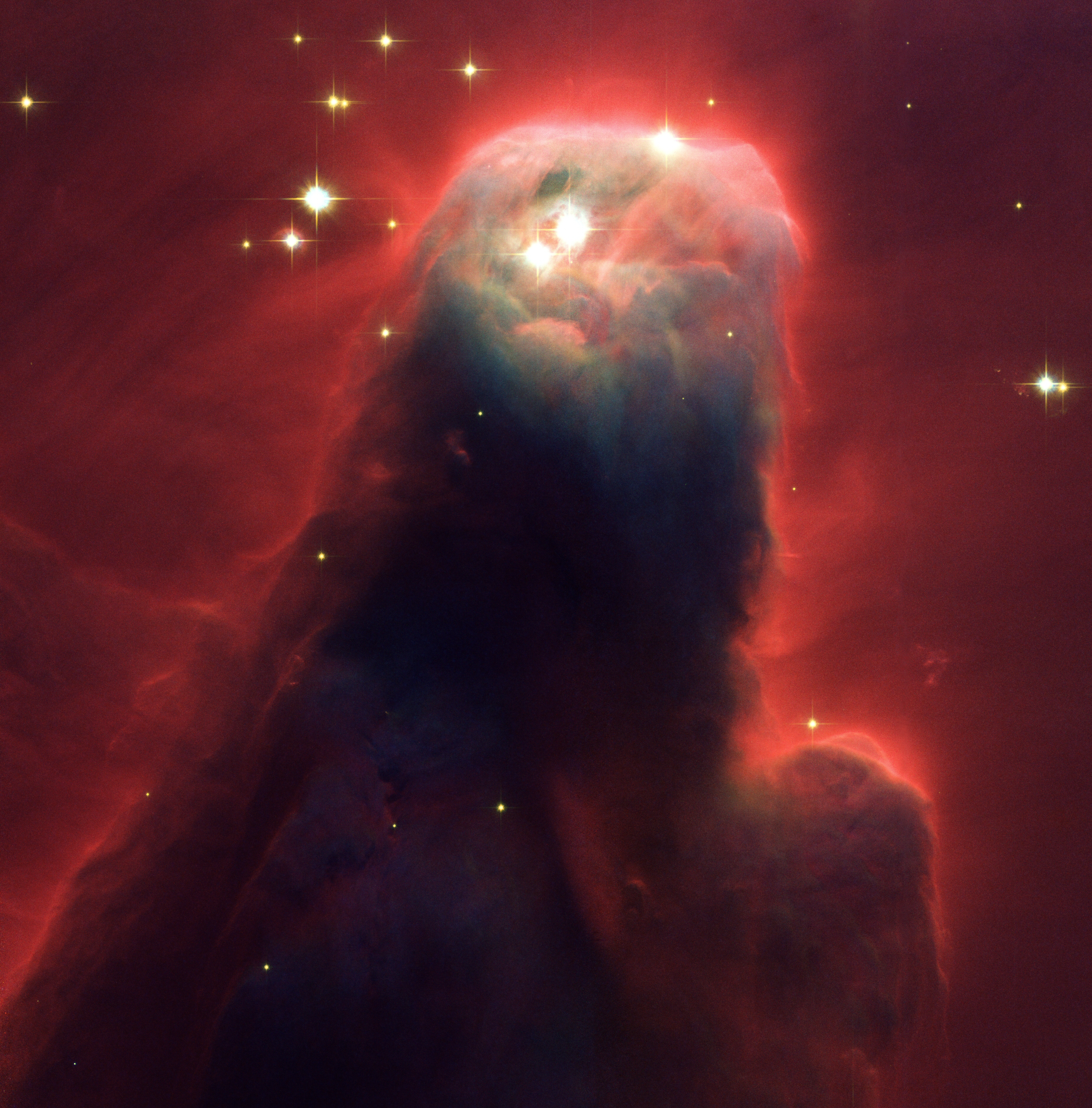
- Taken on April 2, 2002 by the Hubble Space Telescope

Observation data: J2000.0 epoch
- Right ascension: 06^{h} 41^{m} 15^{s}
- Declination: +09° 21′
- Distance: 2,700 ly
- Apparent magnitude (V): —
- Apparent dimensions (V): 3 arcmins
- Constellation: Monoceros

Physical characteristics
- Radius: 4 ly
- Absolute magnitude (V): —
- Notable features: Christmas Tree Cluster
- Designations: NGC 2264 (portion)

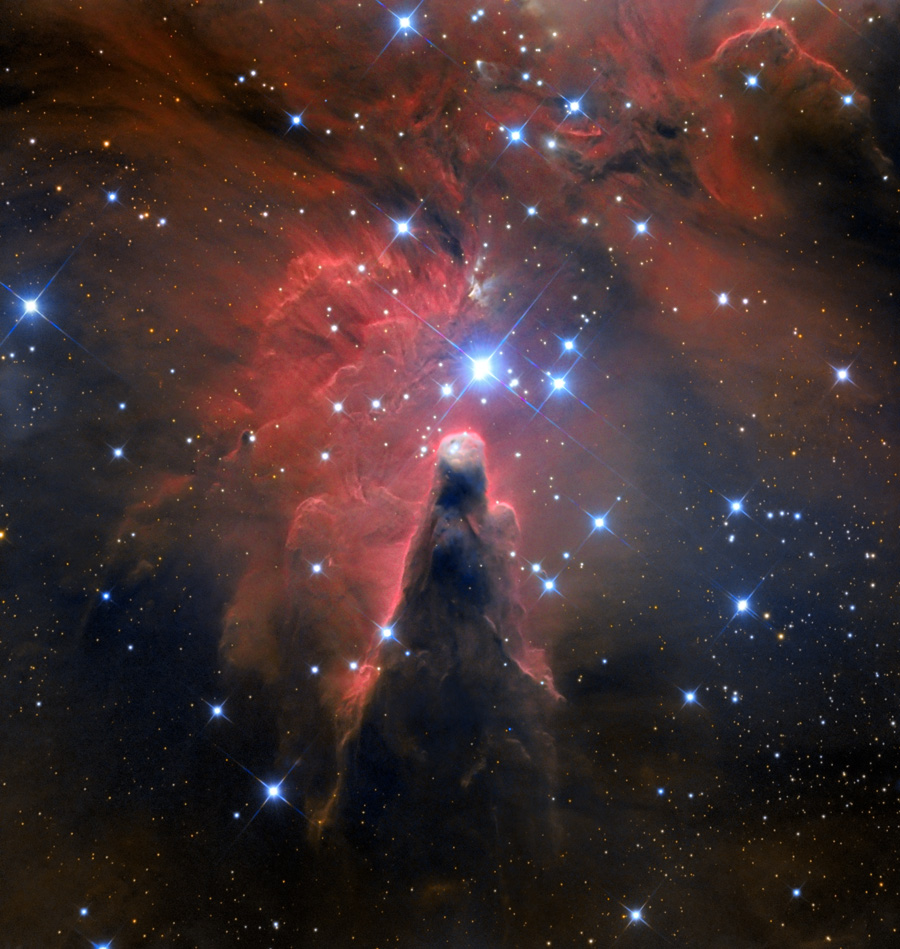
An image of the Cone Nebula and the molecular cloud surrounding it. This image was taken from the Mount Lemmon SkyCenter Schulman Telescope.

The Cone Nebula is an H II region in the constellation of Monoceros. It was discovered by William Herschel on December 26, 1785, at which time he designated it H V.27. The nebula is located about 830 parsecs or 2,700 light-years from Earth. The Cone Nebula forms part of the nebulosity surrounding the Christmas Tree Cluster. The designation of NGC 2264 in the New General Catalogue refers to both objects and not the nebula alone.

== Description ==
The diffuse Cone Nebula, so named because of its apparent shape, lies in the southern part of NGC 2264, the northern part being the magnitude-3.9 Christmas Tree Cluster. It is in the northern part of Monoceros, just north of the midpoint of a line from Procyon to Betelgeuse.

The cone's shape comes from a dark absorption nebula consisting of cold molecular hydrogen and dust in front of a faint emission nebula containing hydrogen ionized by S Monocerotis, the brightest star of NGC 2264. The faint nebula is approximately seven light-years long (with an apparent length of 10 arcminutes), and is 2,700 light-years from Earth.

The nebula is part of a much larger star-forming complex—the Hubble Space Telescope was used to capture images of forming stars in 1997.

== See also ==
- Perceptions of religious imagery in natural phenomena
