= Camelopardalis OB1 =

Group of stars

Observation data (J2000 epoch)
- Constellation: Camelopardalis
- Right ascension: 03^{h} 31.6^{m}
- Declination: +58° 38′
- Mean distance: 3.3 kly (1.0 kpc)
- Radial velocity: +1.6 km/s

Physical characteristics
- Mass: 5.0×10^{3} M_{☉}

Camelopardalis OB1 (Cam OB1) is a group of young stars that share a common origin and a similar motion through space, but, as a whole, are no longer gravitationally bound. The name indicates this stellar association is located in the area of the constellation Camelopardalis which includes a number of massive, short-lived OB stars. The association is ~3,300 ly (1,000 pc) distant from the Sun, with members lying between 500 pc and 1,500 pc away. It is located on the edge of the local Orion Arm of the Milky Way galaxy and lies outside the traditional Gould Belt.

The member stars were first classified as an association by Georg (Jiří) Alter, B. Y. Israel, and Jaroslav Ruprecht in 1966. The open cluster NGC 1502 is considered a member of Cam OB1. A second cluster in Cam OB1, G144.9+0.4, was identified in 2010 with 91 OB candidate stars. Excluding these clusters, two O-type and 35 B-type stars have been identified as members. Stars have been forming in the region of this association for the last 100 million years, and star formation is still in progress. It has a combined mass of ~5,000 times the mass of the Sun.
