= Stellar association =

Loose star cluster

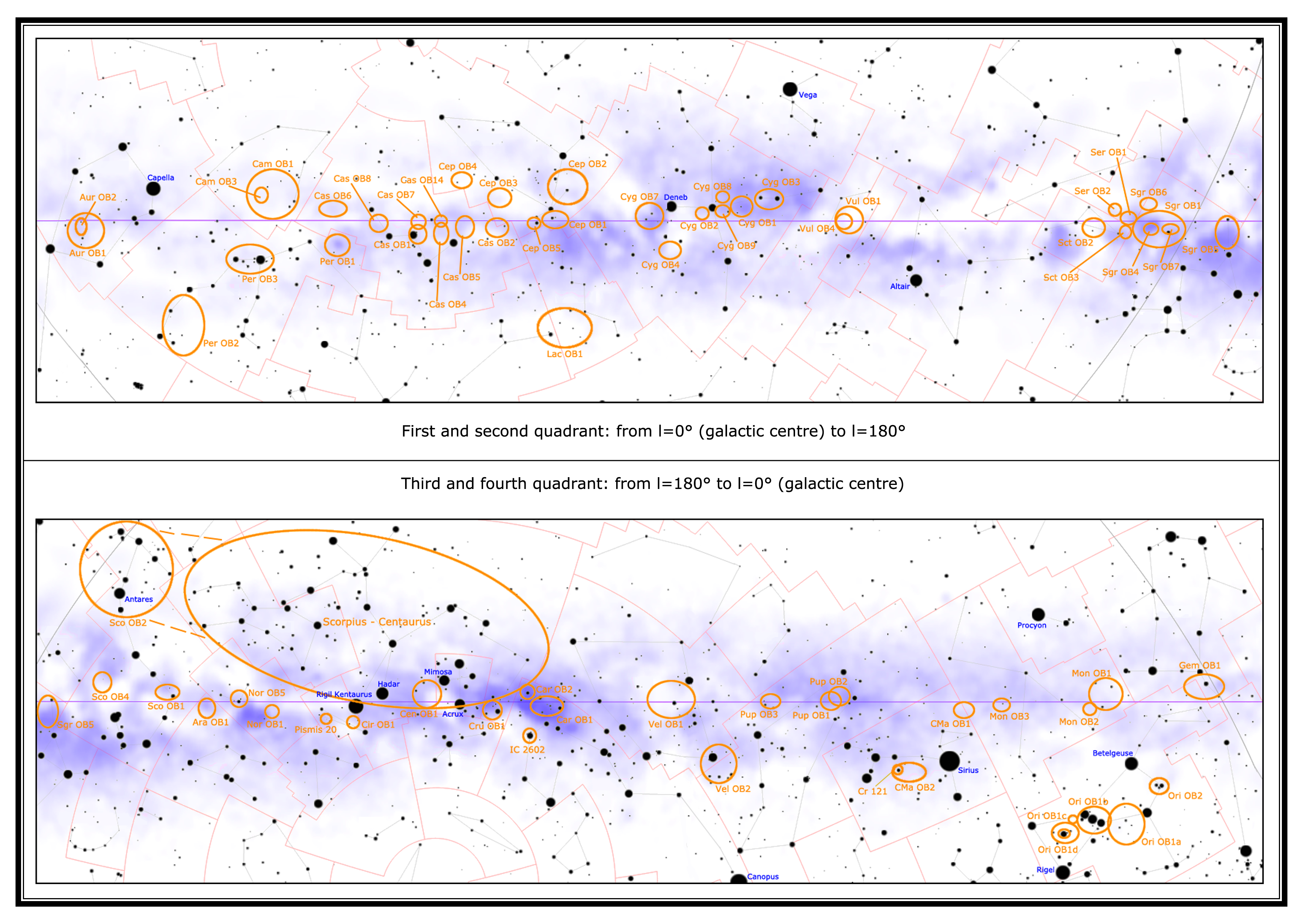
Main associations of the galactic plane in the night sky

A stellar association is a very loose star cluster, looser than both open clusters and globular clusters. Stellar associations will normally contain from 10 to 100 or more visible stars. An association is primarily identified by commonalities in its member stars' movement vectors, ages, and chemical compositions. These shared features indicate that the members share a common origin. Nevertheless, they have become gravitationally unbound, unlike star clusters, and the member stars will drift apart over millions of years, becoming a moving group as they scatter throughout their neighborhood within the galaxy.

Stellar associations were discovered by Victor Ambartsumian in 1947. The conventional name for an association uses the names or abbreviations of the constellation (or constellations) in which they are located; the association type, and, sometimes, a numerical identifier.

== Types ==
Victor Ambartsumian first categorized stellar associations into two groups, OB and T, based on the properties of their stars. A third category, R, was later suggested by Sidney van den Bergh for associations that illuminate reflection nebulae.

The OB, T, and R associations form a continuum of young stellar groupings. But it is currently uncertain whether they are an evolutionary sequence, or represent some other factor at work. Some groups also display properties of both OB and T associations, so the categorization is not always clear-cut.

=== OB associations ===
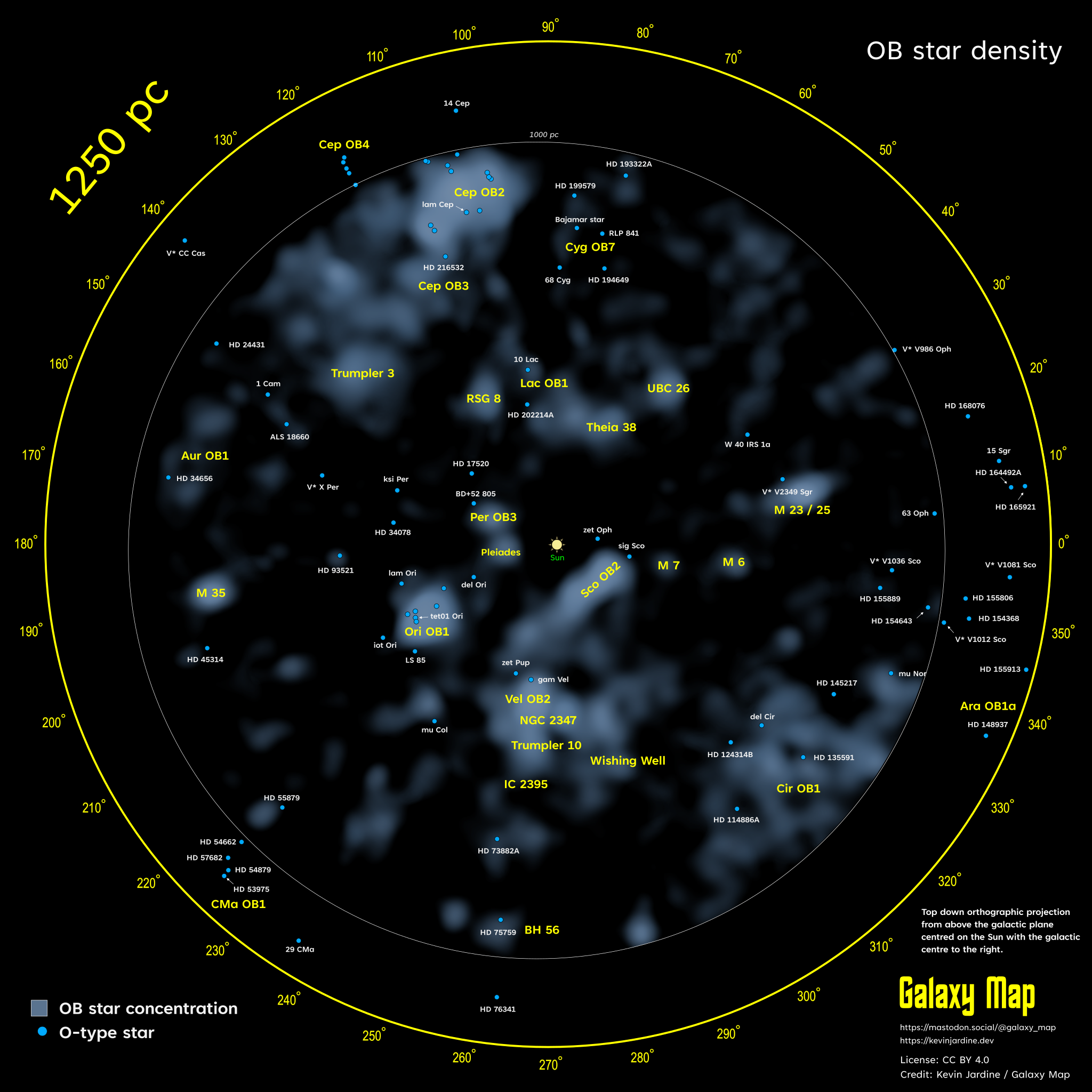
OB within 1250 pc (Quintana)

Young associations will contain 10–100 massive stars of spectral class O and B, and are known as OB associations. These are believed to form within the same small volume inside a giant molecular cloud. Once the surrounding dust and gas is blown away, the remaining stars become unbound and begin to drift apart. It is believed that the majority of all stars in the Milky Way were formed in OB associations.

O class stars are short-lived, and will expire as supernovae after roughly one to fifteen million years, depending on the mass of the star. As a result, OB associations are generally only a few million years in age or less. The O-B stars in the association will have burned all their fuel within 10 million years. (Compare this to the current age of the Sun at about 5 billion years.)

The Hipparcos satellite provided measurements that located a dozen OB associations within 650 parsecs of the Sun. The nearest OB association is the Scorpius–Centaurus association, located about 400 light-years from the Sun.

OB associations have also been found in the Large Magellanic Cloud and the Andromeda Galaxy. These associations can be quite sparse, spanning 1,500 light-years in diameter.

=== T associations ===
Young stellar groups can contain a number of infant T Tauri stars that are still in the process of entering the main sequence. These sparse populations of up to a thousand T Tauri stars are known as T associations. The nearest example is the Taurus-Auriga T association (Tau-Aur T association), located at a distance of 140 parsecs from the Sun. Other examples of T associations include the R Corona Australis T association, the Lupus T association, the Chamaeleon T association and the Velorum T association. T associations are often found in the vicinity of the molecular cloud from which they formed. Some, but not all, include O-B class stars. To summarize the characteristics of Moving groups members: they have the same age and origin, the same chemical composition and they have the same amplitude and direction in their vector of velocity.

=== R associations ===
Associations of stars that illuminate reflection nebulae are called R associations, a name suggested by Sidney van den Bergh after he discovered that the stars in these nebulae had a non-uniform distribution. These young stellar groupings contain main sequence stars that are not sufficiently massive to disperse the interstellar clouds in which they formed. This allows the properties of the surrounding dark cloud to be examined by astronomers. Because R-associations are more plentiful than OB associations, they can be used to trace out the structure of the galactic spiral arms. An example of an R-association is Monoceros R2, located 830 ± 50 parsecs from the Sun.

== Known associations ==
The Ursa Major Moving Group is one example of a stellar association. (Except for α Ursae Majoris and η Ursae Majoris, all the stars in the Plough/Big Dipper are part of that group.)

Other young moving groups include:

- Local Association (Pleiades moving group)
- Hyades Stream
- IC 2391 supercluster
- Beta Pictoris moving group
- Castor moving group
- AB Doradus moving group
- Zeta Herculis moving group
- Alpha Persei moving cluster
- Cameleopardis OB1 association

== See also ==
- OB star
- Moving groups
- Open clusters
- List of nearby stellar associations and moving groups
- Stellar kinematics
