= CoRoT =

European space telescope that operated between 2006 - 2014

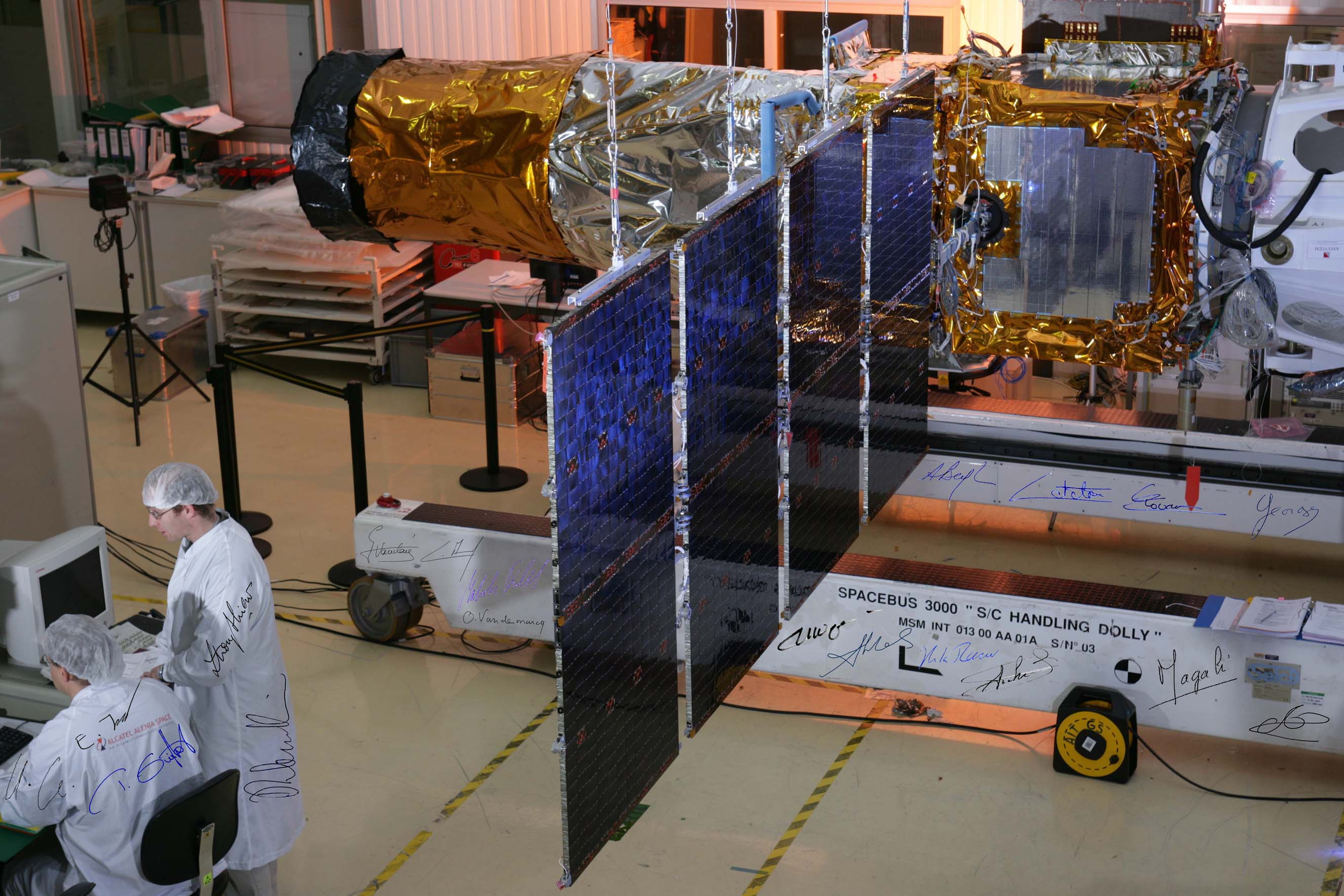
- The CoRoT satellite in the integration hall of Thales Alenia Space, Cannes
- Mission type: Space telescope
- Operator: CNES / ESA
- COSPAR ID: 2006-063A
- SATCAT no.: 29678
- Website: corot.cnes.fr
- Mission duration: Planned: 2.5 + 4 years Final: 7 years, 5 months, 20 days

Spacecraft properties
- Manufacturer: CNES; Thales Alenia Space
- Launch mass: 630 kg (1,390 lb)
- Payload mass: 300 kg (660 lb)
- Dimensions: 2 m × 4 m (6.6 ft × 13.1 ft)
- Power: ≈380 W

Start of mission
- Launch date: 27 December 2006, 14:24 UTC
- Rocket: Soyuz 2.1b Fregat
- Launch site: Baikonur LC-31/6
- Contractor: Arianespace; Starsem

End of mission
- Disposal: Decommissioned
- Deactivated: 17 June 2014, 10:27 UTC

Orbital parameters
- Reference system: Geocentric
- Regime: Polar
- Semi-major axis: 7,123 km (4,426 mi)
- Eccentricity: 0.0203702
- Perigee altitude: 607.8 km (377.7 mi)
- Apogee altitude: 898.1 km (558.1 mi)
- Inclination: 90.0336 degrees
- Period: 99.7 minutes
- RAAN: 13.64 degrees
- Argument of perigee: 148.21 degrees
- Mean anomaly: 213.16 degrees
- Mean motion: 14.44 rev/day
- Epoch: 8 March 2016, 11:58:39 UTC
- Revolution no.: 47715

Main telescope
- Type: Afocal
- Diameter: 27 cm (11 in)
- Focal length: 1.1 m (43 in)
- Wavelengths: Visible light

CoRoT (French: Convection, Rotation et Transits planétaires; English: Convection, Rotation and planetary Transits) was a space telescope mission which operated from 2006 to 2013. The mission's two objectives were to search for extrasolar planets with short orbital periods, particularly those of large terrestrial size, and to perform asteroseismology by measuring solar-like oscillations in stars. The mission was led by the French Space Agency (CNES) in conjunction with the European Space Agency (ESA) and other international partners.

Among the notable discoveries was CoRoT-7b, discovered in 2009 which became the first exoplanet shown to have a rock or metal-dominated composition.

CoRoT was launched at 14:28:00 UTC on 27 December 2006, atop a Soyuz 2.1b rocket, reporting first light on 18 January 2007. Subsequently, the probe started to collect science data on 2 February 2007. CoRoT was the first spacecraft dedicated to the detection of transiting extrasolar planets, opening the way for more advanced probes such as Kepler and TESS. It detected its first extrasolar planet, CoRoT-1b, in May 2007, just 3 months after the start of the observations. Mission flight operations were originally scheduled to end 2.5 years from launch but operations were extended to 2013. On 2 November 2012, CoRoT suffered a computer failure that made it impossible to retrieve any data from its telescope. Repair attempts were unsuccessful, so on 24 June 2013 it was announced that CoRoT had been retired and would be decommissioned; lowered in orbit to allow it to burn up in the atmosphere.

== Overview ==
=== Spacecraft design ===
The CoRoT optical design minimized stray light coming from the Earth and provided a field of view of 2.7° by 3.05°. The CoRoT optical path consisted of a 27 cm (10.6 in) diameter off-axis afocal telescope housed in a two-stage opaque baffle specifically designed to block sunlight reflected by the Earth and a camera consisting of a dioptric objective and a focal box. Inside the focal box was an array of four CCD detectors protected against radiation by aluminum shielding 10mm thick. The asteroseismology CCDs are defocused by 760μm toward the dioptric objective to avoid saturation of the brightest stars. A prism in front of the planet detection CCDs gives a small spectrum designed to disperse more strongly in the blue wavelengths.

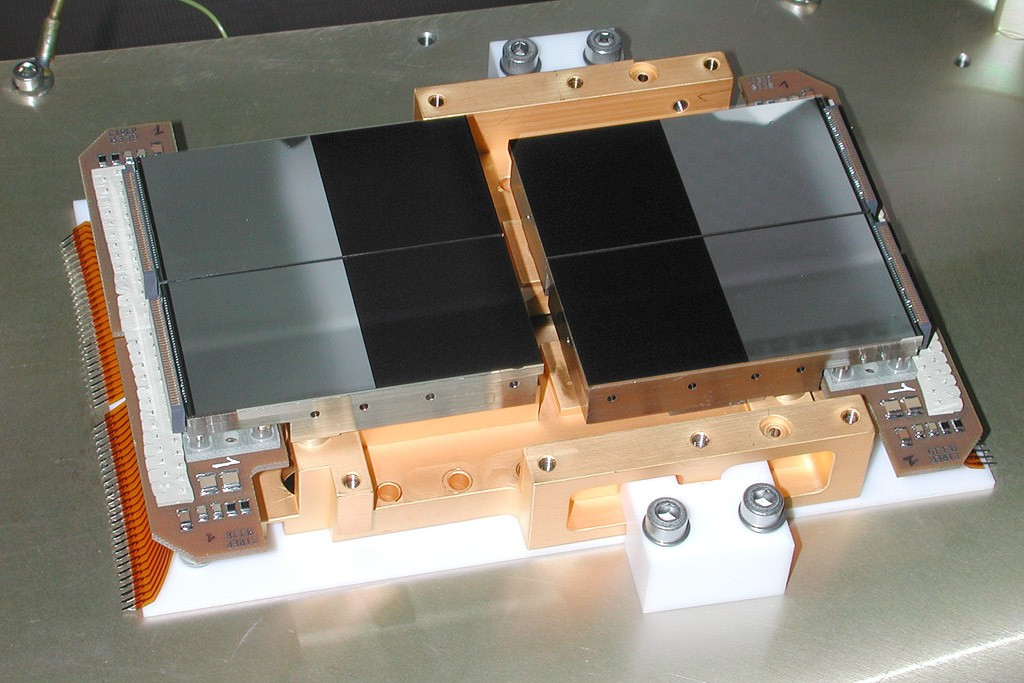
The focal plane of CoRoT with its four full frame transfer CCD. The dark zone corresponds to the photo-sensitive area. Two CCDs are dedicated to the exoplanet programme and the two other ones to the asteroseismology programme.

The four CCD detectors are model 4280 CCDs provided by E2V Technologies. These CCDs are frame-transfer, thinned, back-illuminated designs in a 2,048 by 2,048 pixel array. Each pixel is 13.5 μm × 13.5 μm in size which corresponds to an angular pixel size of 2.32 arcsec. The CCDs are cooled to −40 °C (233.2 K; −40.0 °F). These detectors are arranged in a square pattern with two each dedicated to the planetary detection and asteroseismology. The data output stream from the CCDs are connected in two chains. Each chain has one planetary detection CCD and one asteroseismology CCD. The field of view for planetary detection is 3.5°. The satellite, built in the Cannes Mandelieu Space Center, had a launch mass of 630 kg, was 4.10 m long, 1.984 m in diameter and was powered by two solar panels.

=== Mission design ===
The satellite observed perpendicular to its orbital plane, meaning there were no Earth occultations, allowing up to 150 days of continuous observation. These observation sessions, called "Long Runs", allowed detection of smaller and long-period planets. During the remaining 30 days between the two main observation periods, CoRoT observed other patches of sky for a few weeks long "Short Runs", in order to analyze a larger number of stars for the asteroseismic program. After the loss of half the field of view due to failure of Data Processing Unit No. 1 in March 2009, the observation strategy changed to 3 months observing runs, in order to optimize the number of observed stars and detection efficiency.

In order to avoid the Sun entering in its field of view, during the northern summer CoRoT observed in an area around Serpens Cauda, toward the Galactic Center, and during the winter it observed in Monoceros, in the Galactic anticenter. Both these "eyes" of CoRoT have been studied in preliminary observations carried out between 1998 and 2005, allowing the creation of a database, called CoRoTsky, with data about the stars located in these two patches of sky. This allowed selecting the best fields for observation: the exoplanet research program requires a large number of dwarf stars to be monitored, and to avoid giant stars, for which planetary transits are too shallow to be detectable. The asteroseismic program required stars brighter than magnitude 9, and to cover as many different types of stars as possible. In addition, in order to optimize the observations, the fields had to not be too sparse – fewer targets observed – or too crowded – too many stars overlapping. Several fields were observed during the mission:

- IRa01, from 18 January 2007 to 3 April 2007 – 9,879 stars observed;
- SRc01, from 3 April 2007 to 9 May 2007 – 6,975 stars observed;
- LRc01, from 9 May 2007 to 15 October 2007 – 11,408 stars observed;
- LRa01, from 15 October 2007 to 3 March 2008 – 11,408 stars observed;
- SRa01, from 3 March 2008 to 31 March 2008 – 8,150 stars observed;
- LRc02, from 31 March 2008 to 8 September 2008 – 11,408 stars observed;
- SRc02, from 8 September 2008 to 6 October 2008 – 11,408 stars observed;
- SRa02, from 6 October 2008 to 12 November 2008 – 10,265 stars observed;
- LRa02, from 12 November 2008 to 30 March 2009 – 11,408 stars observed;
- LRc03, from 30 March 2009 to 2 July 2009 – 5,661 stars observed;
- LRc04, from 2 July 2009 to 30 September 2009 – 5,716 stars observed;
- LRa03, from 30 September 2009 to 1 March 2010 – 5,289 stars observed;
- SRa03, from 1 March 2010 to 2 April 2010;
- LRc05, from 2 April 2010 to 5 July 2010;
- LRc06, from 5 July 2010 to 27 September 2010;
- LRa04, from 27 September 2010 to 16 December 2010;
- LRa05, from 16 December 2010 to 5 April 2011;
- LRc07, from 5 April 2011 to 30 June 2011;
- SRc03, from 1 July 2011 to 5 July 2011 – a run made to reobserve the transit of CoRoT-9b;
- LRc08, from 6 July 2011 to 30 September 2011;
- SRa04, from 30 September 2011 to 28 November 2011;
- SRa05, from 29 November 2011 to 9 January 2012;
- LRa06, from 10 January 2012 to 29 March 2012 – a run dedicated to reobservation of CoRoT-7b;
- LRc09, from 10 April 2012 to 5 July 2012;
- LRc10, from 6 July 2012 to 1 November 2012 - interrupted by the fatal failure which ended the mission.

The spacecraft monitored the brightness of stars over time, searching for the slight dimming that happens in regular intervals when planets transit their host star. In every field, CoRoT recorded the brightness of thousands stars in the V-magnitude range from 11 to 16 for the extrasolar planet study. In fact, stellar targets brighter than 11 saturated the exoplanets CCD detectors, yielding inaccurate data, whilst stars dimmer than 16 do not deliver enough photons to allow planetary detections. CoRoT was sensitive enough to detect rocky planets with a radius two times larger than Earth, orbiting stars brighter than 14; it is also expected to discover new gas giants in the whole magnitude range.

CoRoT also studied asteroseismology. It can detect luminosity variations associated with acoustic pulsations of stars. This phenomenon allows calculation of a star's precise mass, age and chemical composition and will aid in comparisons between the sun and other stars. For this program, in each field of view there was one main target star for asteroseismology as well as up to nine other targets. The number of observed targets have dropped to half after the loss of Data Processing Unit No. 1.

The mission began on 27 December 2006 when a Russian Soyuz 2-1b rocket lifted the satellite into a circular polar orbit with an altitude of 827 km . The first scientific observation campaign started on 3 February 2007.

The mission's cost amounted to €170 million, of which 75% was paid by the French space agency CNES and 25% was contributed by Austria, Belgium, Germany, Spain, Brazil and the European Space Agency (ESA).

== Development ==
The primary contractor for the construction of the CoRoT vehicle was CNES, to which individual components were delivered for vehicle assembly. The CoRoT equipment bay, which houses the data acquisition and pre-processing electronics, was constructed by the LESIA Laboratory at the Paris Observatory and took 60 person-years to complete. The design and building of the instruments were done by the Laboratoire d'études spatiales et d'instrumentation en astrophysique (LESIA) de l'Observatoire de Paris, the Laboratoire d'Astrophysique de Marseille, the Institut d'Astrophysique Spatiale (IAS) from Orsay, the Centre spatial de Liège (CSL) in Belgium, the IWF in Austria, the DLR (Berlin) in Germany and the ESA Research and Science Support Department. The 30 cm afocal telescope Corotel has been realized by Alcatel Alenia Space in the Centre spatial de Cannes Mandelieu.

== Potential ==
Before the beginning of the mission, the team stated with caution that CoRoT would only be able to detect planets few times larger than Earth or greater, and that it was not specifically designed to detect habitable planets. According to the press release announcing the first results, CoRoT's instruments are performing with higher precision than had been predicted, and may be able to find planets down to the size of Earth with short orbits around small stars. The transit method requires the detection of at least two transits, hence the planets detected will mostly have an orbital period under 75-day. Candidates that show only one transit have been found, but uncertainty remains about their exact orbital period.

CoRoT should be assumed to detect a small percentage of planets within the observed star fields, due to the low percentage of exoplanets that would transit from the angle of observation of the Solar System. The chances of seeing a planet transiting its host star is inversely proportional to the diameter of the planet's orbit, thus close in planets detections will outnumber outer planets ones. The transit method is also biased toward large planets, since their very depth transits are more easily detected than the shallows eclipses induced by terrestrial planets.

== Failure of Data Processing Unit No. 1 ==
On 8 March 2009 the satellite suffered a loss of communication with Data Processing Unit No. 1, processing data from one of the two photo-detector chains on the spacecraft. Science operations resumed early April with Data Processing Unit No. 1 offline while Data Processing Unit No. 2 operating normally. The loss of photo-detector chain number 1 results in the loss of one CCD dedicated to asteroseismology and one CCD dedicated to planet detection. The field of view of the satellite is thus reduced by 50%, but without any degradation of the quality of the observations. The loss of channel 1 appears to be permanent.

== Follow-up program ==
The rate of discoveries of transiting planets is dictated by the need of ground-based, follow-up observations, needed to verify the planetary nature of the transit candidates. Candidate detections have been obtained for about 2.3% of all CoRoT targets, but finding periodic transit events isn't enough to claim a planet discovery, since several configurations could mimic a transiting planet, such as stellar binaries, or an eclipsing fainter star very close to the target star, whose light, blended in the light curve, can reproduce transit-like events. A first screening is executed on the light curves, searching hints of secondary eclipses or a rather V-shaped transit, indicative of a stellar nature of the transits. For the brighter targets, the prism in front of the exoplanets CCDs provides photometry in 3 different colors, enabling to reject planet candidates that have different transit depths in the three channels, a behaviour typical of binary stars. These tests allow to discard 83% of the candidate detections, whilst the remaining 17% are screened with photometric and radial velocity follow-up from a network of telescopes around the world. Photometric observations, required to rule out a possible contamination by a diluted eclipsing binary in close vicinity of the target, is performed on several 1 m-class instruments, but also employs the 2 m Tautenburg telescope in Germany and the 3,6 m CFHT/Megacam in Hawaii. The radial velocity follow-up allows to discard binaries or even multiple star system and, given enough observations, provide the mass of the exoplanets found. Radial velocity follow-up is performed with high-precision spectrographs, namely SOPHIE, HARPS and HIRES. Once the planetary nature of the candidate is established, high-resolution spectroscopy is performed on the host star, in order to accurately determine the stellar parameters, from which further exoplanet characteristics can be derived. Such work is done with large aperture telescopes, as the UVES spectrograph or HIRES.

Interesting transiting planets could be further followed-up with the infrared Spitzer Space Telescope, to give an independent confirmation at a different wavelength and possibly detect reflected light from the planet or the atmospheric compositions. CoRoT-7b and CoRoT-9b have already been observed by Spitzer.

Papers presenting the results of follow-up operations of planetary candidates in the IRa01, LRc01, LRa01, SRc01 fields have been published. In April 2019, a summary of the exoplanet search results have been published, with 37 planets and brown dwarfs confirmed, and a further one hundred planet candidates still to be verified. Sometimes the faintness of the target star or its characteristics, such as a high rotational velocity or strong stellar activity, do not allow to determine unambiguously the nature or the mass of the planetary candidate.

== Discoveries ==
=== Asteroseismology and stellar physics ===
Stars vibrate according to many different pulsation modes in much the same way that musical instruments emit a variety of sounds. Listening to an air on the guitar does not leave any doubt as to the nature of the instrument, and an experienced musician can even deduce the cords' material and tension. Similarly, stellar pulsation modes are characteristic of global stellar properties and of the internal physical conditions. Analyzing these modes is thus a way of probing stellar interiors to infer stellar chemical composition, rotation profiles and internal physical properties such as temperatures and densities. Asteroseismology is the science which studies the vibration modes of a star. Each of these modes can be mathematically represented by a spherical harmonic of degree l and azimuthal order m. Some examples are presented here below with a color scheme in which blue (red) indicates contracting (expanding) material. The pulsation amplitudes are highly exaggerated.

A few examples of stellar vibration modes
l=1, m=0	l=2, m=0	l=2, m=1	l=4, m=2

When applied to the Sun, this science is called helioseismology and has been ongoing for a few decades by now. The solar surface helium abundance was derived very accurately for the first time, which has definitely shown the importance of microscopic diffusion in the solar structure. Helioseismology analyses have also unveiled the solar internal rotational profile, the precise extent of the convective envelope and the location of the helium ionization zone. Despite enormous technical challenges, it was thus tempting to apply similar analyses to stars. From the ground this was only possible for stars close to the Sun such as α Centauri, Procyon, β Virginis... The goal is to detect extremely small light variations (down to 1 ppm) and to extract the frequencies responsible for these brightness fluctuations. This produces a frequency spectrum typical of the star under scrutiny. Oscillation periods vary from a few minutes to several hours depending on the type of star and its evolutionary state. To reach such performances, long observing times devoid of day/night alternations are required. Space is thus the ideal asteroseismic laboratory. By revealing their microvariability, measuring their oscillations at the ppm level, CoRoT has provided a new vision of stars, never reached before by any ground-based observation.

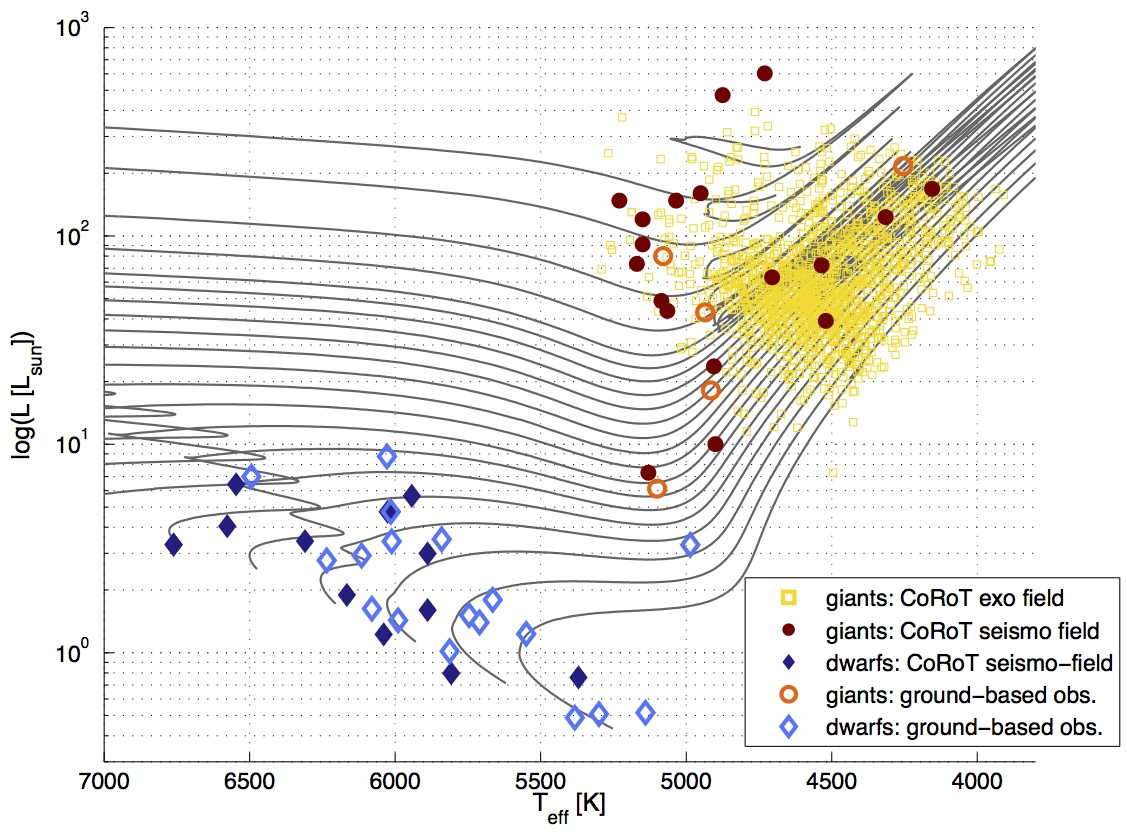
Dwarf and giant stars observed by CoRoT in the sismo and exo fields with some additional stars observed from the ground. From the work of members of the CoRoT team

At the beginning of the mission, two out of four CCDs were assigned to asteroseismic observations of bright stars (apparent magnitude 6 to 9) in the so-called seismo field while the other CCDs were reserved for exoplanet hunting in the so-called exo field. Albeit with a lower signal to noise ratio, interesting science on stars was also obtained from the exoplanets channel data, where the probe records several thousands of light curves from every observed field. Stellar activity, rotation periods, star spot evolution, star–planet interactions, multiple star systems are nice extras in addition to the main asteroseismic program. This exo field also turned out to be of incalculable richness in asteroseismic discoveries. During the first six years of its mission, CoRoT has observed about 150 bright stars in the seismo field and more than 150 000 weak stars in the exo field. The figure shows where most of them are located in the Hertzsprung–Russell diagram together with some others observed from the ground.

Discoveries were numerous, including the first detection of solar-like oscillations in stars other than the Sun, the first detection of non-radial oscillations in red giant stars, the detection of solar-like oscillations in massive stars, the discovery of hundreds of frequencies in δ Scuti stars, the spectacular time evolution of the frequency spectrum of a Be (emission lines B) star during an outburst, the first detection of a deviation from a constant period spacing in gravity modes in an SPB (Slowly Pulsating B) star. Interpreting those results opened new horizons in humanity's vision of stars and galaxies. In October 2009 the CoRoT mission was the subject of a special issue of Astronomy and Astrophysics, dedicated to the early results of the probe. Below are some examples of breakthrough contributions to stellar astrophysics, based on CoRoT's data:

==== Extension of the chemically mixed zone in main sequence stars ====
Above the convective core where mixing of chemicals is instantaneous and efficient, some layers can be affected by partial or total mixing during the main sequence phase of evolution. The extent of this extra mixed zone as well as the mixing efficiency are, however, difficult to assess. This additional mixing has very important consequences since it involves longer time scales for nuclear burning phases and may in particular affect the value of the stellar mass at the transition between those stars which end up their life as white dwarfs and those which face a final supernova explosion. The impact on the chemical evolution of the galaxy is obvious. Physical reasons for this extra-mixing are various, either a mixing induced by internal rotation or a mixing resulting from convective bubbles crossing the convective core boundary to enter the radiative zone where they finally lose their identity (overshooting), or even some other poorly known processes.

1. Solar-like stars: The solar-like star HD 49933 is illustrative of this extra-mixing problem. Its convective envelope is responsible for the presence of solar-like oscillations. Comparing the observed frequency spectrum with that obtained from theoretical models of 1.19 M_{☉} computed with and without additional mixing clearly excludes a model without extra mixing.
2. Sub-giant stars: Such an additional mixing also affects the structure of more evolved sub-giant stars since the mass extension of the helium core formed during core hydrogen burning is increased. The sub-giant star HD 49385 of 1.3 M_{☉} was submitted to CoRoT scrutiny and although not fully conclusive, new constraints were brought to the modeling of such stars.
3. SPB stars: More massive SPB (Slowly Pulsating B) stars show a frequency spectrum dominated by high order gravity modes excited by the κ mechanism at work in layers where ionizations of iron group elements produces an opacity peak. In such stars, the convective core is surrounded by a region of varying chemical composition, the so-called μ-gradient region, left by the progressive withdrawal of the convective core as hydrogen is transformed into helium. This region is rather thin and constitutes a sharp transition region, which induces a very subtle signature in the gravity modes frequency spectrum. Instead of a constant period spacing found in a homogeneous stellar model, periodic deviations from this constant value are expected in models affected by a sharp transition region. Moreover, the period of the deviations is directly related to the precise location of the sharp transition. This phenomenon has been detected in two hybrid B stars (showing at the same time acoustic β Cephei and gravity SPB modes): (1) HD 50230 where an extra-mixing with a somewhat smooth shape is clearly required in the modeling and (2) HD 43317.

==== Structure of the superficial stellar layers ====
1. Transition layers in stellar envelopes: Transition layers such as the helium ionization region or the lower boundary of the convective envelope in low mass and red giant stars also affect frequency spectra. In a structure devoid of such discontinuities, high order acoustic modes obey some regularities in their frequency distribution (large frequency separation, second difference...). Transition zones introduce periodic deviations with respect to these regularities and the periods of the deviations are directly related to the precise location of the transition zones. These deviations were predicted by theory and were first observed in the Sun. Thanks to CoRoT they were also detected in the solar-like star HD 49933 and also in the red giant star HD 181907. In both cases the location of the helium ionization zone could be accurately derived.
2. Amplitudes and line widths in solar-like oscillation spectra: One of the major successes of the CoRoT space mission has definitely been the detection of solar-like oscillations in stars slightly hotter than the Sun. As was previously done for the Sun, measurements of amplitudes and line widths in their frequency spectra resulted in new constraints in the modeling of stochastic excitations of acoustic modes by turbulent convection. The frequency spectrum of HD 49933 was confronted to the stochastic excitation model developed by Samadi et al. Except at high frequencies, a good agreement can be reached by adopting a metallicity ten times smaller than the solar metallicity. With the solar value on the contrary, disagreements in amplitudes can reach a factor 2 at low frequencies.
3. Granulation: The presence of granulation was detected in the frequency spectrum of HD 49933. Analyses have been done with 3D hydrodynamical model atmospheres computed at solar and ten times smaller than solar metallicities. Here again the model with the lowest metallicity shows up to be closer to the observations although significant disagreements still remain.

==== Red giants and chemical evolution of this galaxy ====
Following exhaustion of hydrogen in the core, the overall stellar structure drastically changes. Hydrogen burning now takes place in a narrow shell surrounding the newly processed helium core. While the helium core quickly contracts and heats up, the layers above the hydrogen-burning shell undergo important expansion and cooling. The star becomes a red giant whose radius and luminosity increase in time. These stars are now located on the so-called red giant branch of the Hertzsprung–Russell diagram; they are commonly named RGB stars. Once their central temperature reaches 100 10^{6} K, helium starts burning in the core. For stellar masses smaller than about 2 M_{☉}, this new combustion takes place in a highly degenerate matter and proceeds through a helium flash. The readjustment following the flash brings the red giant to the so-called red clump (RC) in the Hertzsprung-Russell diagram.

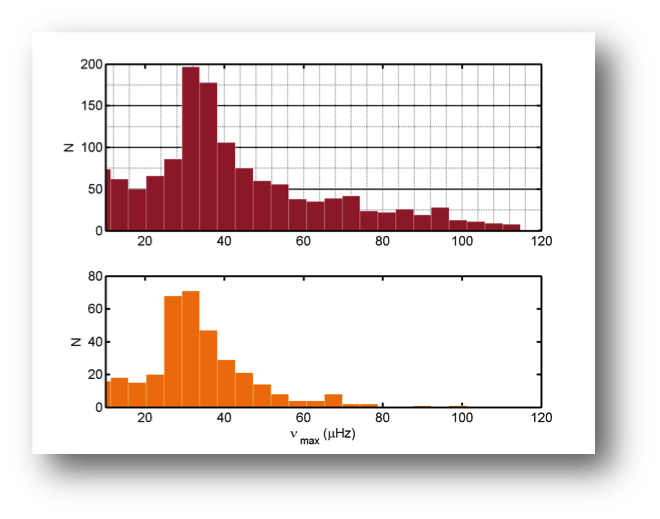
Histograms of a synthetic red giant population (in red) and CoRoT red giant population (in orange). From Andrea Miglio and collaborators

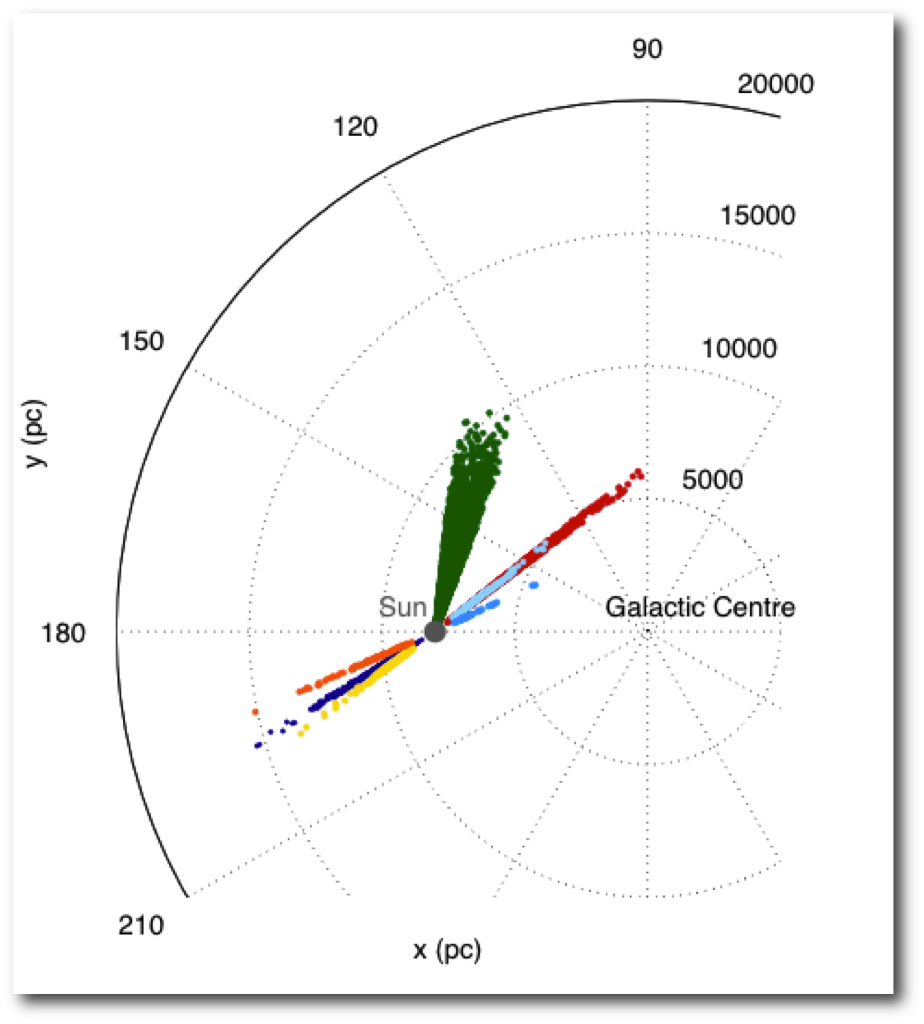
3D map of this galaxy from seismic data of red giants observed by CoRoT. From Andrea Miglio and collaborators

Whether RGB or RC, these stars all have an extended convective envelope favorable to the excitation of solar-like oscillations. A major success of CoRoT has been the discovery of radial and long-lived non-radial oscillations in thousands of red giants in the exo field. For each of them, the frequency at maximum power ν_{max} in the frequency spectrum as well as the large frequency separation between consecutive modes Δν could be measured, defining a sort of individual seismic passport.

1. Red giant population in this galaxy: Introducing these seismic signatures, together with an estimation of the effective temperature, in the scaling laws relating them to the global stellar properties, gravities (seismic gravities), masses and radii can be estimated and luminosities and distances immediately follow for those thousands of red giants. Histograms could then be drawn and a totally unexpected and spectacular result came out when comparing these CoRoT histograms with theoretical ones obtained from theoretical synthetic populations of red giants in this galaxy. Such theoretical populations were computed from stellar evolution models, with adopting various hypotheses to describe the successive generations of stars along the time evolution of this galaxy. Andrea Miglio and collaborators noticed that both types of histograms were spitting images of one another, as can be seen in the histograms picture. Moreover, adding the knowledge of the distances of these thousands of stars to their galactic coordinates, a 3D map of this galaxy was drawn. This is illustrated in the figure where different colors relate to different CoRoT runs and to Kepler observations (green points).
2. Age-metallicity relation in this galaxy: The age of a red giant is closely related to its former main sequence lifetime, which is in turn determined by its mass and metallicity. Knowing the mass of a red giant amounts to knowing its age. If the metallicity is known the uncertainty in age does not exceed 15%! Observational missions such as APOGEE (Apache Point Observatoty Galactic Evolution Environment) whose goal is to measure metallicities for 100 000 red giants in this galaxy, GALAH (Galactic Archaeology with HERMES) and GAIA (Global Astrometric Interferometer for Astrophysics) could of course widely benefit from these seismic gravities with the ultimate output of establishing the age-metallicity relation in this galaxy. Asteroseismology has crossed the doorstep of the structure and chemical evolution of this galaxy.
3. Seismic signatures and extension of mixed zones during central hydrogen and helium burning: Increasing even further the scrutiny in analyzing the CoRoT and Kepler frequency spectra of red giants brought new important discoveries. Small and subtle differences in seismic signatures allow us to distinguish RGB from RC stars notwithstanding their similar luminosities. This is now theoretically confirmed thanks to elaborate red giant modeling. The period spacings of gravity-dominated modes are expected to be especially meaningful. Their detection for a large number of red giants could give us clues to establishing the extent of the extra-mixed region above the convective core during core hydrogen burning, but also the extent of the extra-mixed region during core helium burning, both mixing processes being a priori totally unrelated.

==== Massive stars ====
Massive variable main sequence stars have frequency spectra dominated by acoustic modes excited by the κ mechanism at work in layers where partial ionization of iron group elements produce a peak in opacity. In addition the most advanced of these stars present mixed modes i.e. modes with a g-character in deep layers and p-character in the envelope. Hydrogen burning takes place in a convective core surrounded by a region of varying chemical composition and an envelope mostly radiative except for tiny convective layers related to partial ionization of helium and/or iron group elements. As in lower mass stars the extent of the fully or partially mixed region located just above the convective core (extra-mixed zone) is one of the main uncertainties affecting theoretical modeling.

1. β Cephei stars: Seismic analyses of β Cephei stars show that it is not obvious to derive a one-to-one extent of this extra-mixed zone. A rather large extent seems to be required to model θ Ophiuchi while a much smaller one is favored for HD 129929, for β Canis Majoris, for δ Ceti, and for 12 Lacertae. This extra-mixed zone could even be absent in the structure of V1449 Aquilae (HD 180642) and ν Eridani. It would be extremely interesting to establish a relation between the extent of this zone and the rotation velocity and/or the magnetic field of the star. Seismic analysis of V2052 Ophiuchi shows that this star although rapidly rotating, which would favor extra-mixing, could be devoid of such a region. The magnetic field detected in this star could be the reason of this lack of extra-mixing.

1. Be stars: Late Be type stars HD 181231 and HD 175869 are very rapid rotators, about 20 times more rapid than the Sun. Their seismic analysis seems to require a centrally mixed zone about 20% larger than what is expected from convection only. Another Be star, HD 49330, had a very exciting surprise in store. Observed by CoRoT during an outburst of matter towards its circumstellar disk, which is typical of such stars, its frequency spectrum suffered drastic changes. Firstly dominated by acoustic modes the spectrum showed the appearance of gravity modes with amplitudes strictly in line with the outburst. Such a link between the nature of the excited modes and a dynamical phenomenon is of course a gold mine in the quest for the internal structure of Be stars.
2. O stars: Many O stars have been observed by CoRoT. Among them HD 46150 and HD 46223 (members of the galactic cluster NGC 2264) and HD 46966 (member of the OB association Mon OB2) do not seem to pulsate, which is in agreement with stellar modeling of stars with similar global parameters. The frequency spectrum of the Plaskett's star HD 47129 on the contrary shows a peak with six harmonics in the frequency range expected from theoretical modeling.

Another unexpected CoRoT discovery was the presence of solar-like oscillations in massive stars. The small convective shell related to the opacity peak resulting from the ionization of iron group elements at about 200 000 K (iron opacity peak) could indeed be responsible for the stochastic excitation of acoustic modes like those observed in the Sun.

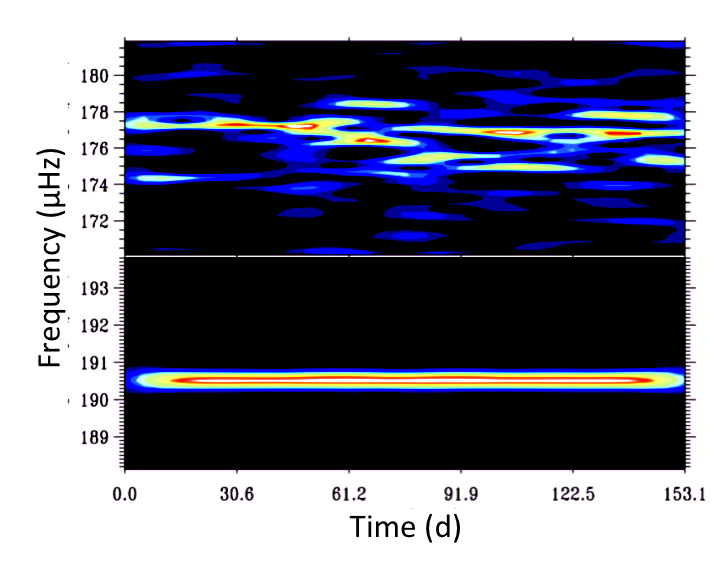
Frequency versus time for a solar-like mode (top) and a beta Cephei mode (bottom) in Chimera. From Kevin Belkacem, Frédéric Baudin and collaborators

1. V1449 Aquilae (HD 180642): This CoRoT target is a β Cephei star whose frequency spectrum reveals high frequency and very small amplitude acoustic modes. A careful analysis has shown that they were solar-like oscillations excited by turbulent bubbles origination from this convective iron opacity peak zone or even from the convective core. This is indeed a major discovery since it was the first time that pulsations excited by the κ mechanism acting in the iron opacity peak zone were present side by side in the same star with pulsations stochastically excited by this very same zone. This is the reason why Kevin Belkacem, main discoverer of these solar-like oscillations in V1449 Aquilae, added a new baptismal certificate to this β Cephei star and named it Chimera. The figure illustrates the behavior of the frequency versus time for two modes in the frequency spectrum of Chimera, a solar-like mode (top) and a β Cephei mode (bottom). The stochastic nature of the solar-like mode reveals itself in the instability of its frequency as time goes on and in the spread in frequency on several μHz. The contrast with the stability in frequency and the narrow frequency range of the β Cephei mode is striking.
2. HD 46149: Later on solar-like oscillations were even discovered in a more massive O star member of the binary system HD 46149. Constraints coming from the binary nature of the system coupled with seismic constraints led to the determination of the orbital parameters of the system as well as to the global properties of its members.

==== The open cluster NGC 2264 ====
During a 23-day observing run in March 2008, CoRoT observed 636 members of the young open cluster NGC 2264. The so-called Christmas tree cluster, is located in the constellation Monoceros relatively close to us at a distance of about 1800 light years. Its age is estimated to be between 3 and 8 million years. At such a young age, the cluster is an ideal target to investigate many different scientific questions connected to the formation of stars and early stellar evolution. The CoRoT data of stars in NGC 2264 allow us to study the interaction of recently formed stars with their surrounding matter, the rotation and activity of cluster members as well as their distribution, the interiors of young stars by using asteroseismology, and planetary and stellar eclipses.

The stellar births and the stars' childhoods remain mostly hidden from us in the optical light because the early stars are deeply embedded in the dense molecular cloud from which they are born. Observations in the infrared or X-ray enable us to look deeper into the cloud, and learn more about these earliest phases in stellar evolution. Therefore, in December 2011 and January 2012, CoRoT was part of a large international observing campaign involving four space telescopes and several ground-based observatories. All instruments observed about 4000 stars in the young cluster NGC 2264 simultaneously for about one month at different wavelengths. The Canadian space mission MOST targeted the brightest stars in the cluster in the optical light, while CoRoT observed the fainter members. MOST and CoRoT observed NGC 2264 continuously for 39 days. The NASA satellites Spitzer and Chandra measured at the same time the stars in the infrared (for 30 days) and the X-ray domains (for 300 kiloseconds). Ground-based observations were taken also at the same time, for example, with the ESO Very Large Telescope in Chile, the Canadian-French-Hawaiian Telescope in Hawaii, the McDonald Observatory in Texas, or the Calar Alto Observatory in Spain.

The CoRoT observations led to the discovery of about a dozen pulsating pre-main sequence (PMS) δ Scuti stars and the confirmation of the existence of γ Doradus pulsations in PMS stars. Also the presence of hybrid δ Scuti/γ Doradus pulsations was confirmed in members of NGC 2264. The CoRoT observations included also the well known pre-main sequence pulsators, V 588 Mon and V 589 Mon, which were the first discovered members of this group of stars. The precision attained in the CoRoT light curves also revealed the important role of granulation in pre-main sequence stars.

The investigation of T Tauri stars and their interaction with their circumstellar matter using CoRoT data revealed the existence of a new class, the AA Tauri type objects. Previously to the CoRoT observations, T Tauri stars were known to either show sinusoidal light variations that are caused by spots on the stellar surface, or completely irregular variability that is caused by the gas and dust disks surrounding the young stars. AA Tauri type objects show periodically occurring minima that are different in depth and width, hence are semi-regular variables. With the CoRoT observations this class of objects could be established. Exciting insights into the earliest phases of stellar evolution also come from the comparison of the variability present in the optical light to that in the infrared and the X-ray regime.

==== Binary systems ====
A large number of binary systems with non-radially pulsating members were observed by CoRoT. Some of them, which were eclipsing binaries with members of γ Doradus type, were discovered during CoRoT runs. The eclipse phenomenon plays a key role since global parameters can immediately follow, bringing invaluable constraints, in addition to the seismic ones, to stellar modeling.

1. AU Monocerotis: This semi-detached binary system contains a Be star interacting with its G star companion. Its observation by CoRoT provided an extremely high quality lightcurve. Global parameters could then be improved and new ephemeris for the orbital motion as well as for another long term variation were derived. This long period variation seems to originate from a periodic light attenuation by circumstellar dust.
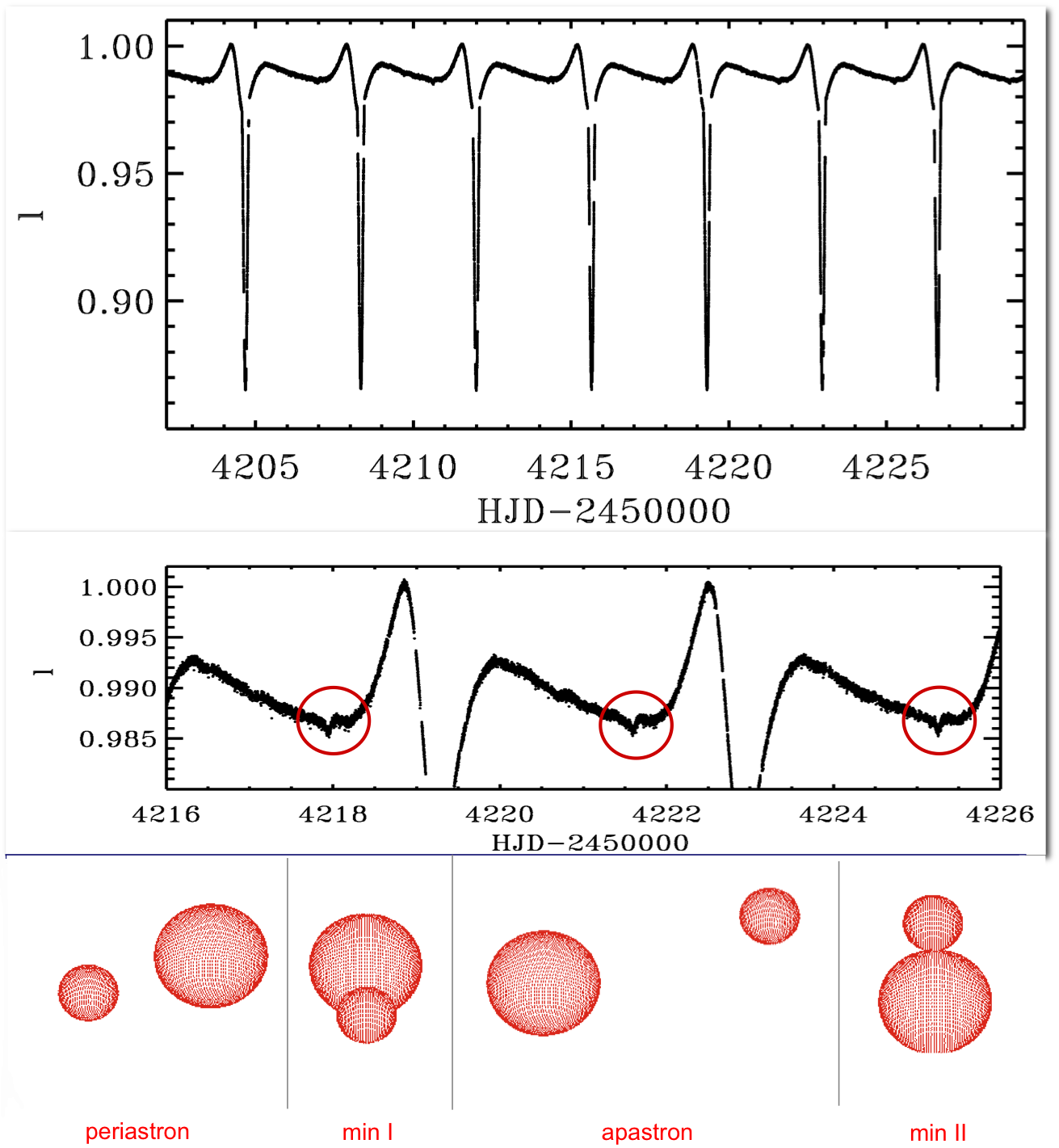
  The light curve of HD 174884. The upper panel shows the full light curve. The second panel is a blow-up where tiny secondary minima are visible (their depth is 1% of the deeper minimum). The third panel shows the projection on the plane of the sky (i.e. as we see the system) at different phases. From Carla Maceroni and the CoRoT binary team
2. HD 174884: Tidally induced pulsations have been detected in the high eccentricity (e=0.29) and short period binary system HD 174884 consisting of two B stars. The upper panel of the figure shows the full light curve of the system. In the second panel tiny secondary eclipses are seen with a depth of about 1% of the depth of the primary eclipse. Actually the system is formed of stars of similar mass, size and temperature. Were the orbit circular, the eclipses would be similar in depth. However the orbit is highly eccentric and its orientation in space with respect to us is such that the secondary eclipse occurs when the stars are at a larger distance than at primary eclipse. The third panel of the figure shows the projection on the plane of the sky (i.e. the system as we see it) at different orbital phases.
3. CoRoT 102918586 (alias CoRoT Sol 1): The relatively bright eclipsing system CoRoT 102918586 is a double-lined spectroscopic binary, observed by CoRoT, which revealed clear evidence of γ Doradus type pulsations. In addition to CoRoT photometry, a spectroscopic follow-up was performed which yielded the radial velocity curves, the component effective temperatures, the metallicity, and the line-of-sight projected rotational velocities. The eclipsing binary light curve analysis, combined with the spectroscopic results, provided system physical parameters with 1–2% accuracy while the comparison with evolutionary models led to constraints on the age of the system. After subtracting the best–fitting eclipsing binary model, the residuals were analyzed to determine the pulsation properties. The primary star pulsates with typical γ Dor frequencies and shows a period spacing consistent with high order g-modes of degree l=1.
4. HR 6902: The binary system HR 6902 containing a red giant and a B star was observed by CoRoT during two runs, which allowed us to fully cover the primary as well as the secondary eclipses. This system is presently being analyzed with the ultimate goal of bringing new constraints on the internal structure of the red giant in particular.
5. A low mass binary: One of the binary system observed by CoRoT is of particular interest since the less massive component is a late M star of 0.23 M_{☉} with an estimated effective temperature of about 3000 K. The primary component is a 1.5 M_{☉} star MS star.
6. A beaming effect in a binary: A binary system observed by CoRoT showed out of eclipses variations which were interpreted as a beaming effect (also called Doppler boosting). This effect results from the variation in brightness of source approaching or moving away from the observer, with an amplitude proportional to the radial velocity divided by the speed of light. The periodic variation in the velocity of an orbiting star will thus produce a periodic beaming variation in the light curve. Such an effect can confirm the binary nature of a system even without any detectable eclipses nor transits. One of the main advantages of the beaming effect is the possibility to determine the radial velocity directly from the light curve but very different luminosities of the binary components are required and a single radial velocity curve can only be obtained as in an SB1 binary system. The out of eclipse variations were modeled with the BEER (Beaming Ellipsoidal Reflection) algorithm.

=== Exoplanets ===
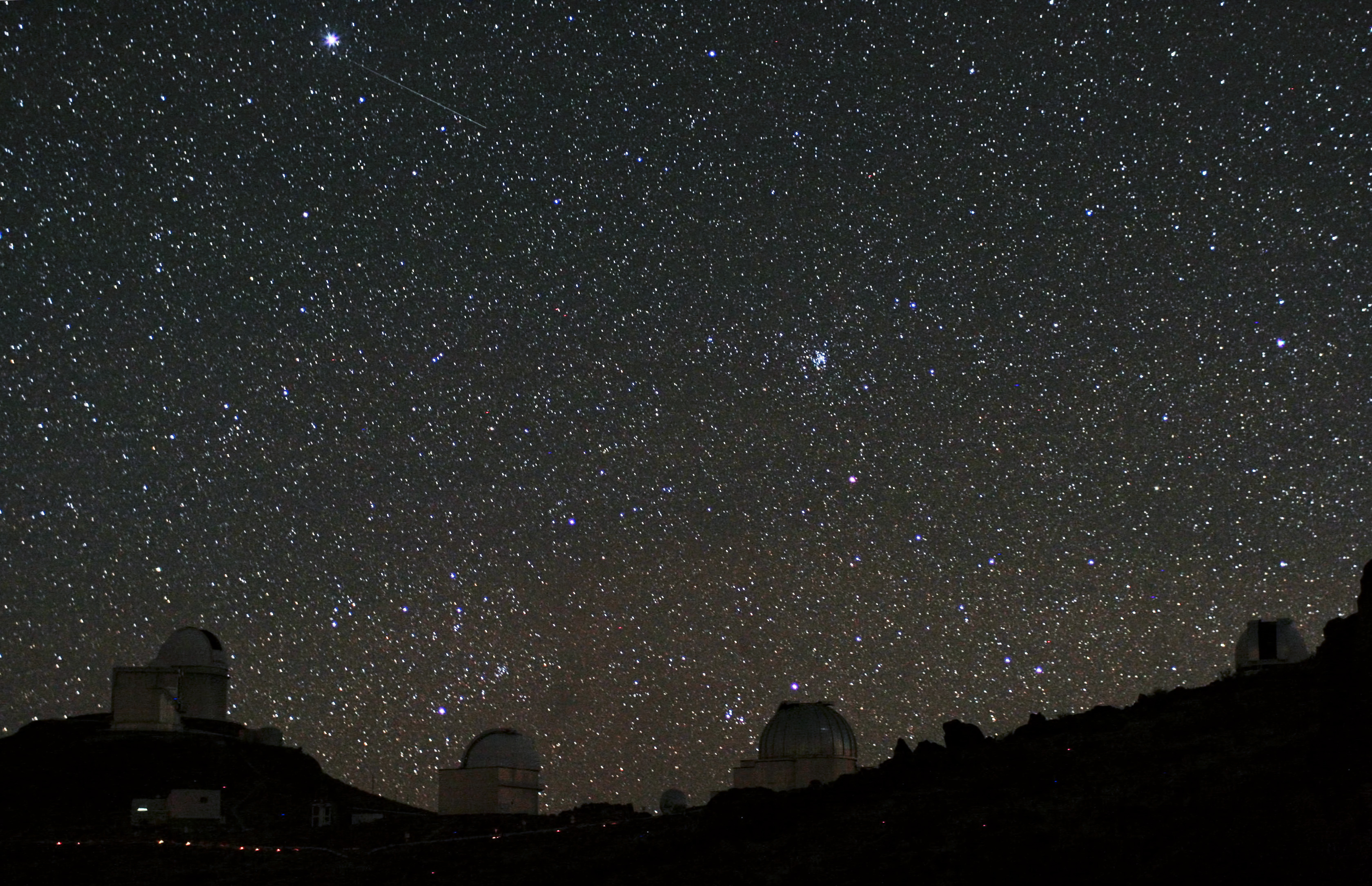
Two Planet-hunters Snapped at La Silla Observatory.

To find extra solar planets, CoRoT uses the method of transits detection. The primary transit is the occultation of a fraction of the light from a star when a celestial object, such as a planet, passes between the star and the observer. Its detection is made possible by the sensitivity of CCD to very small changes in light flux. Corot is capable of detecting changes in brightness of about 1/10,000. Scientists can thus hope finding planets with a size of approximately 2 times that of the Earth with this method, a class of planet called Super-Earth; detection of Corot-7b, whose radius is 1.7 times that of the Earth has shown that these predictions were correct. CoRoT takes an exposure of 32 seconds duration, each 32 seconds, but the image is not fully transmitted to Earth because the data flow would be too large. The onboard computer performs an important work of data reduction: the field around each target star, previously selected by the exoplanets team, is defined on a certain number of pixels described by a particular mask, the sum all pixels within the mask is then performed and several exposures are added (usually 16, which amounts to an integration time of about 8 minutes) before sending this information to the ground. For some stars, considered particularly of interest, data of each exposure is transmitted every 32 seconds. Such a sampling of 32s or 512s is well suited to the detection of a planetary transit that lasts from a little less than an hour to several hours. A feature of this method is that it requires to detect at least three successive transits separated by two equal time intervals before one can consider a target as a serious candidate. A planet of orbital period T should at least be observed for a time interval between 2T and 3T to have a chance to detect three transits. The distance of the planet to the star ( which is characterized by a the semi-major axis of the elliptical orbit ) is linked to its orbital period by the second law of Kepler / Newton a^{3} = T^{2} M_{star}, using respectively as units for a, M and T: the distance from the Earth to the Sun (150 million km), the mass of the Sun, the orbital period of the Earth (1 year); this implies that if the observing time is less a year, for example, the orbits of the detectable planets will be significantly smaller than that of the Earth. So, for CoRoT, due to the maximum duration of 6 months of observation for each star field, only planets closer to their stars than 0.3 Astronomic Units (less than the distance between the Sun and Mercury) can be detected, therefore generally not in the so-called habitable zone. The Kepler mission (NASA) has continuously observed the same field for many years and thus had the ability to detect Earth sized planets located farther from their stars.

The moderate number of exoplanets discovered by CoRoT (34 during the 6 years of operation), is explained by the fact that a confirmation should absolutely be provided by ground-based telescopes, before any announcement is made. Indeed, in the vast majority of cases, the detection of several transits does not mean the detection of a planet, but rather that of a binary star system, either one that corresponds to a grazing occultation of a star by the other, or that the system is close enough to a bright star (the CoRoT target) and the effect of transit is diluted by the light of this star; in both cases the decrease in brightness is low enough to be compatible with that of a planet passing in front of the stellar disk. To eliminate these cases, one performs observations from the ground using two methods: radial velocity spectroscopy and imaging photometry with a CCD camera. In the first case, the mass of the binary stars is immediately detected and in the second case one can expect to identify in the field the binary system near the target star responsible for the alert: the relative decline of brightness will be greater than the one seen by CoRoT which adds all the light in the mask defining the field of measurement. In consequence, the CoRoT exoplanet science team has decided to publish confirmed and fully characterized planets only and not simple candidate lists. This strategy, different from the one pursued by the Kepler mission, where the candidates are regularly updated and made available to the public, is quite lengthy. On the other hand, the approach also increases the scientific return of the mission, as the set of published CoRoT discoveries constitute some of the best exoplanetary studies carried out so far.

==== Timeline of planetary discoveries ====
CoRoT discovered its first two planets in 2007: the hot Jupiters CoRoT-1b and CoRoT-2b. Results on asteroseismology were published in the same year.

In May 2008, two new exoplanets of Jupiter size, CoRoT-4b and CoRoT-5b, as well as an unknown massive celestial object, CoRoT-3b, were announced by ESA.

In February 2009, during the First CoRoT Symposium, the super-Earth CoRoT-7b was announced, which at the time was the smallest exoplanet to have its diameter confirmed, at 1.58 Earth diameters. The discoveries of a second non-transiting planet in the same system, CoRoT-7c, and of a new Hot Jupiter, CoRoT-6b, were also announced at the Symposium.

In March 2010 CoRoT-9b was announced. It's a long period planet (95.3 days) in an orbit close to that of Mercury.

In June 2010 the CoRoT team announced six new planets, CoRoT-8b, CoRoT-10b, CoRoT-11b, CoRoT-12b, CoRoT-13b, CoRoT-14b, and a brown dwarf, CoRoT-15b. All the planets announced are Jupiter sized, except CoRoT-8b, which appears to be somewhat between Saturn and Neptune. The probe was also able to tentatively detect the reflected light at optical wavelengths of HD46375 b, a non-transiting planet.

In June 2011, during the Second CoRoT Symposium, the probe added ten new objects to the Exoplanet catalogue: CoRoT-16b, CoRoT-17b, CoRoT-18b, CoRoT-19b, CoRoT-20b, CoRoT-21b, CoRoT-22b, CoRoT-23b, CoRoT-24b, CoRoT-24c.

As of November 2011, around 600 additional candidate exoplanets are being screened for confirmation.

==== Main results ====
Among the exoplanets CoRoT detected, one can highlight a subset with the most original features :

- CoRot-1b, the first planet detected by CoRoT is a hot Jupiter. By further analysis, CoRoT-1b became the first exoplanets to have its secondary eclipse detected in the optical, thanks to the high precision lightcurve delivered by CoRoT.
- CoRoT-3b, with a mass of 22 M_{Jup}, it appears to be "something between a brown dwarf and a planet." According to the definition of planet proposed by the owners of the exoplanet.eu database three years later, CoRoT-3b, being less massive than 25 Jupiter masses, is classified as an exoplanet. In an August 2010 paper, CoRoT detected the ellipsoidal and the relativistic beaming effects in the CoRoT-3 lightcurve.

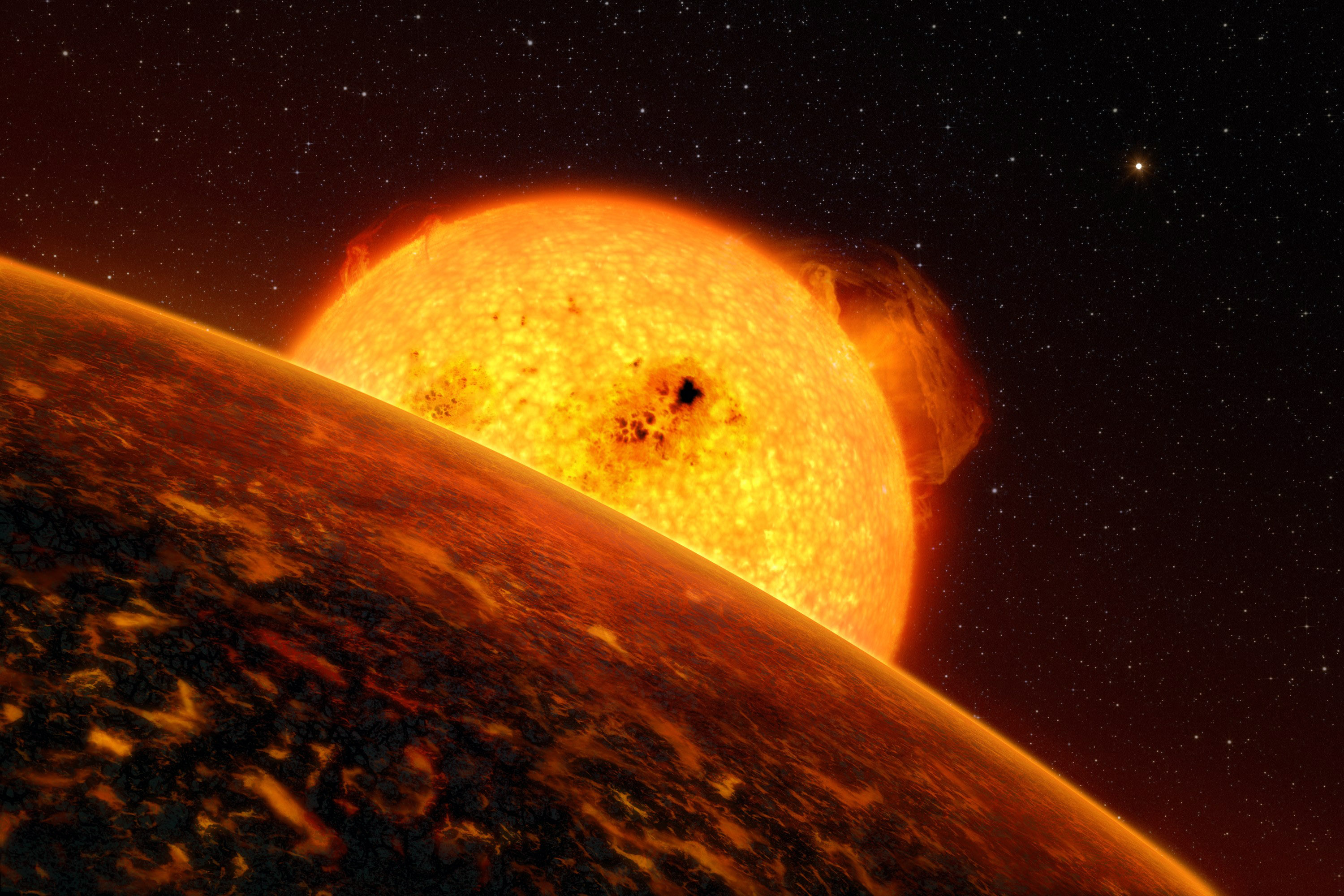
Artist's impression of CoRoT-7b, the first rocky Super-Earth ever discovered thanks to a good estimate of its size and mass and therefore its density.

- CoRot-7b, with a radius of 1.7 R_{Earth} and a mass of 7.3 M_{Earth}, was the first confirmed rocky planet, with a density and composition which are close to those of the Earth. Its orbital period (i.e. its local year) is very short since it lasts just 20.5 h; because the planet is very close to its star (an almost solar type star), its orbit is a mere 6 stellar radii. As the planet must be in synchronous rotation with its orbital motion because of the huge tidal forces it undergoes, it always presents the same hemisphere to the star: as a consequence, the two hemispheres, the enlightened and the dark, exhibit an extreme contrast in temperature (2200K vs 50K) and a huge ocean of lava must occupy a large part of the hot side. A continent of water and nitrogen dioxide ices is probably occupying the dark side. CoRoT-7b was also the first case of a system discovered by CoRoT, with two super-Earths, one in transit the other not; radial velocity measurements have indeed led to the discovery of CoRoT-7c, a planet of 8.4 M_{Earth} and a period of 3.79 days. A third planet is even suspected.
- CoRoT-8b, a planet of the same class as Neptune, with a mass of 0.22 M_{Jup};
- CoRoT-9b, the first planet that has earned the epithet of a temperate planet. With 80% of Jupiter mass, and an orbit similar to the Mercury one, this is the first transiting temperate planet found known to be similar to those within the Solar System. At the time of the discovery, it was the second longest period exoplanet found in transit, after HD80606 b.
- CoRoT-11b and CoRoT-2b, two inflated planets, with radius 1.4 and 1.5 R_{Jup} respectively: the theory does not yet provide a consistent model for such objects;
- CoRoT-15b, a bona fide brown dwarf in orbit;
- CoRoT-10b, CoRoT-16b, CoRoT-20b, CoRoT-23b, four hot Jupiters which are on an eccentric orbits, despite circularization is theoretically predicted for such small orbits: this is a clear constraint on Q_{p}, the parameter that quantifies the energy dissipation by tidal forces;
- CoRoT-22b, notable for its small size, having less than half the mass of Saturn.
- CoRoT-24b and c, the second planetary system discovered by CoRoT, with two small planets of 0.10 and 0.17 M_{Jup}. The two planets are of Neptune size, and orbit the same star and represent the first multiple transiting system detected by CoRoT.

==== List of exoplanets discovered ====
The following transiting planets have been announced by the mission.

Light green rows indicate that the planet orbits one of the stars in a binary star system.

Star	Constellation	Right ascension	Declination	App. mag.	Distance (ly)	Spectral type	Planet	Mass (M_{J})	Radius (R_{J})	Orbital period (d)	Semi-major axis (AU)	Orbital eccentricity	Inclination (°)	Discovery year	Ref
CoRoT-1	Monoceros	06^{h} 48^{m} 19^{s}	−03° 06′ 08″	13.6	1,560	G0V	b	1.03	1.49	1.5089557	0.0254	0	85.1	2007
CoRoT-2	Aquila	19^{h} 27^{m} 07^{s}	+01° 23′ 02″	12.57	930	G7V	b	3.31	1.465	1.7429964	0.0281	0	87.84	2007
CoRoT-3	Aquila	19^{h} 28^{m} 13.265^{s}	+00° 07′ 18.62″	13.3	2,200	F3V	b	21.66	1.01	4.25680	0.057	0	85.9	2008
CoRoT-4	Monoceros	06^{h} 48^{m} 47^{s}	−00° 40′ 22″	13.7		F0V	b	0.72	1.19	9.20205	0.090	0	90	2008
CoRoT-5	Monoceros	06^{h} 45m^{m} 07s^{s}	+00° 48′ 55″	14	1,304	F9V	b	0.459	1.28	4.0384	0.04947	0.09	85.83	2008
CoRoT-6	Ophiuchus	18^{h} 44^{m} 17.42^{s}	+06° 39′ 47.95″	13.9		F5V	b	3.3	1.16	8.89	0.0855	< 0.1	89.07	2009
CoRoT-7	Monoceros	06^{h} 43^{m} 49.0^{s}	−01° 03′ 46.0″	11.668	489	G9V	b	0.0151	0.150	0.853585	0.0172	0	80.1	2009
CoRoT-8	Aquila	19^{h} 26^{m} 21^{s}	+01° 25′ 36″	14.8	1,239	K1V	b	0.22	0.57	6.21229	0.063	0	88.4	2010
CoRoT-9	Serpens	18^{h} 43^{m} 09^{s}	+06° 12′ 15″	13.7	1,500	G3V	b	0.84	1.05	95.2738	0.407	0.11	>89.9	2010
CoRoT-10	Aquila	19^{h} 24^{m} 15^{s}	+00° 44 ′ 46″	15.22	1,125	K1V	b	2.75	0.97	13.2406	0.1055	0.53	88.55	2010
CoRoT-11	Serpens	18^{h} 42^{m} 45^{s}	+05° 56′ 16″	12.94	1,826	F6V	b	2.33	1.43	2.99433	0.0436	0	83.17	2010
CoRoT-12	Monoceros	06^{h} 43^{m} 04^{s}	−01° 17′ 47″	15.52	3,750	G2V	b	0.917	1.44	2.828042	0.04016	0.07	85.48	2010
CoRoT-13	Monoceros	06^{h} 50^{m} 53^{s}	−05° 05′ 11″	15.04	4,272	G0V	b	1.308	0.885	4.03519	0.051	0	88.02	2010
CoRoT-14	Monoceros	06^{h} 53^{m} 42^{s}	−05° 32′ 10″	16.03	4,370	F9V	b	7.58	1.09	1.51215	0.027	0	79.6	2010
CoRoT-16	Scutum	18^{h} 34^{m} 06^{s}	−06° 00′ 09″	15.63	2,740	G5V	b	0.535	1.17	5.3523	0.0618	0.33	85.01	2011
CoRoT-17	Scutum	18^{h} 34^{m} 47^{s}	−06° 36′ 44 ″	15.46	3,001	G2V	b	2.43	1.02	3.768125	0.0461	0	88.34	2011
CoRoT-18	Monoceros	06^{h} 32^{m} 41^{s}	−00° 01′ 54″	14.99	2,838	G9	b	3.47	1.31	1.9000693	0.0295	<0.08	86.5	2011
CoRoT-19	Monoceros	06^{h} 28^{m} 08^{s}	−00° 01′ 01″	14.78	2,510	F9V	b	1.11	1.45	3.89713	0.0518	0.047	87.61	2011
CoRoT-20	Monoceros	06^{h} 30^{m} 53^{s}	+00° 13′ 37″	14.66	4,012	G2V	b	4.24	0.84	9.24	0.0902	0.562	88.21	2011
CoRoT-21	Monoceros			16		F8IV	b	2.26	1.30	2.72474	0.0417	0	86.8	2,011
CoRoT-22	Serpens	18^{h} 42^{m} 40^{s}	+06° 13′ 08″	11.93	2,052	G0IV	b	< 0.15	0.52	9.7566	0.094	< 0.6	89.4	2011
CoRoT-23	Serpens	18^{h} 39^{m} 08^{s}	+04° 21′ 28″	15.63	1,956	G0V	b	2.8	1.05	3.6314	0.0477	0.16	85.7	2011
CoRoT-24	Monoceros	06^{h} 47^{m} 41^{s}	−03° 43′ 09″		4,413		b	< 0.1	0.236	5.1134				2011
CoRoT-24	Monoceros	06^{h} 47^{m} 41^{s}	−03° 43′ 09″		4,413		c	0.173	0.38	11.749				2011
CoRoT-25	Ophiuchus	18^{h} 42^{m} 31.120^{s}	+06° 30′ 49.74″	15.02	3,711	F9V	b	0.27	1.08	4.86	0.0578		84.5	2011
CoRoT-26	Ophiuchus	18^{h} 39^{m} 00.0^{s}	+06° 58′ 12.00″	15.76	5,446	G8IV	b	0.5	1.26	4.204	0.0526	0	86.8	2012
CoRoT-27	Serpens	18^{h} 33^{m} 59.00^{s}	+05° 32′ 18.32″	15.77	4413	G2	b	10.39±0.55	1.01±0.04	3.58	0.048	<0.065		2013
CoRoT-28	Ophiuchus	18^{h} 34^{m} 45.0^{s}	+05° 34′ 26″	13.47	1826	G8/9IV	b	0.484±0.087	0.9550±0.0660
CoRoT-29	Ophiuchus	18^{h} 35^{m} 36.50^{s}	+06° 28′ 46.68″	15.56	2,683	K0V	b	0.84	0.90	2.85	0.039	<0.12	87.3	2015
CoRoT-30	Ophiuchus	18^{h} 30^{m} 24.28^{s}	+06° 50′ 09.36″	15.65	3,461	G3V	b	0.84 (± 0.34)	1.02 (± 0.08)	9.06005 (± 0.00024)	0.084 (± 0.001)	0.007 (+0.031 -0.007)	90.0 (± 0.56)	2017
CoRoT-31	Monoceros	06^{h} 19^{m} 16.97^{s}	−04° 25′ 20.16″	15.7	6,940	G2IV	b	2.84 (± 0.22)	1.46 (± 0.3)	4.62941 (± 0.00075)	1.46 (± 0.3)	0.02 (+0.16 -0.02)	83.2 (± 2.3)	2017
CoRoT-32	Monoceros	06^{h} 40^{m} 46.84^{s}	+09° 15′ 26.69″	13.72	1,912	G0VI	b	0.15±0.1	0.57±0.06	6.72
CoRoT-35	Aquila	19^{h} 17^{m} 15.43^{s}	−02° 46′ 28.82″	15.248	3,718	F6V	b	1.10 (± 0.37)	1.68 (± 0.11)	3.22748 (± 0.00008)	0.04290 (± 0.00092)	0	84.1 (± 0.1)	2022
CoRoT-36	Ophiuchus	18^{h} 31^{m} 00.24^{s}	+07° 11′ 00.05″	12.941	3,112	F3V	b	0.68 (+0.47 -0.43)	1.41 (± 0.14)	5.616531 (± 0.000023)	0.066 (± 0.007)	0	85.83 (± 0.26)	2022

==== Other discoveries ====
The following table illustrates brown dwarfs detected by CoRoT as well as non-transiting planets detected in the follow-up program:

Star	Constellation	Right ascension	Declination	App. mag.	Distance (ly)	Spectral type	Object	Type	Mass (M_{J})	Radius (R_{J})	Orbital period (d)	Semi-major axis (AU)	Orbital eccentricity	Inclination (°)	Discovery year	Ref
CoRoT-7	Monoceros	06^{h} 43^{m} 49.0^{s}	−01° 03′ 46.0″	11.668	489	G9V	c	planet	0.0264	–	3.69	0.046	0	–	2009
CoRoT-15	Monoceros	06^{h} 28^{m} 27.82^{s}	+06° 11′ 10.47″	16	4,140	F7V	b	brown dwarf	63.3	1.12	3.06	0.045	0	86.7	2010
CoRoT-33	Serpens	18^{h} 38^{m} 33.91^{s}	+05° 37′ 28.79″	14.7	667	G9V	b	brown dwarf	59.2	1.1	5.819143	0.0579	0.07	85.5	2015
CoRoT-34	Monoceros	06^{h} 51^{m} 29.01^{s}	−03° 49′ 03.46″	14.10	4,892	A7V	b	brown dwarf	71.4	1.09	2.11853	0.03874	0	77.8	2022

==== Global properties of the exoplanets discovered by CoRoT ====
All CoRoT planets were detected during long runs i.e. of at least 70 days. The detection team found on average between 200 and 300 cases of periodic events for each run, corresponding to 2–3% of the stars monitored. Of these, only 530 in total were selected as candidate planets (223 in the direction of the galactic anti-center and 307 towards the center). Only 30 of them were finally found to be true planets, i.e. about 6%, other cases being eclipsing binaries ( 46%) or unresolved cases (48%).

The CoRoT planets cover the wide range of properties and features found in the disparate family of exoplanets: for instance, the masses of CoRoT planets cover a range of almost four orders of magnitude. Tracing the mass of the planet versus the mass of the star, one finds that the CoRoT data set, with its lower scatter than other experiments, indicates a clear trend that massive planets tend to orbit massive stars, which is consistent with the most commonly accepted models of planetary formation.

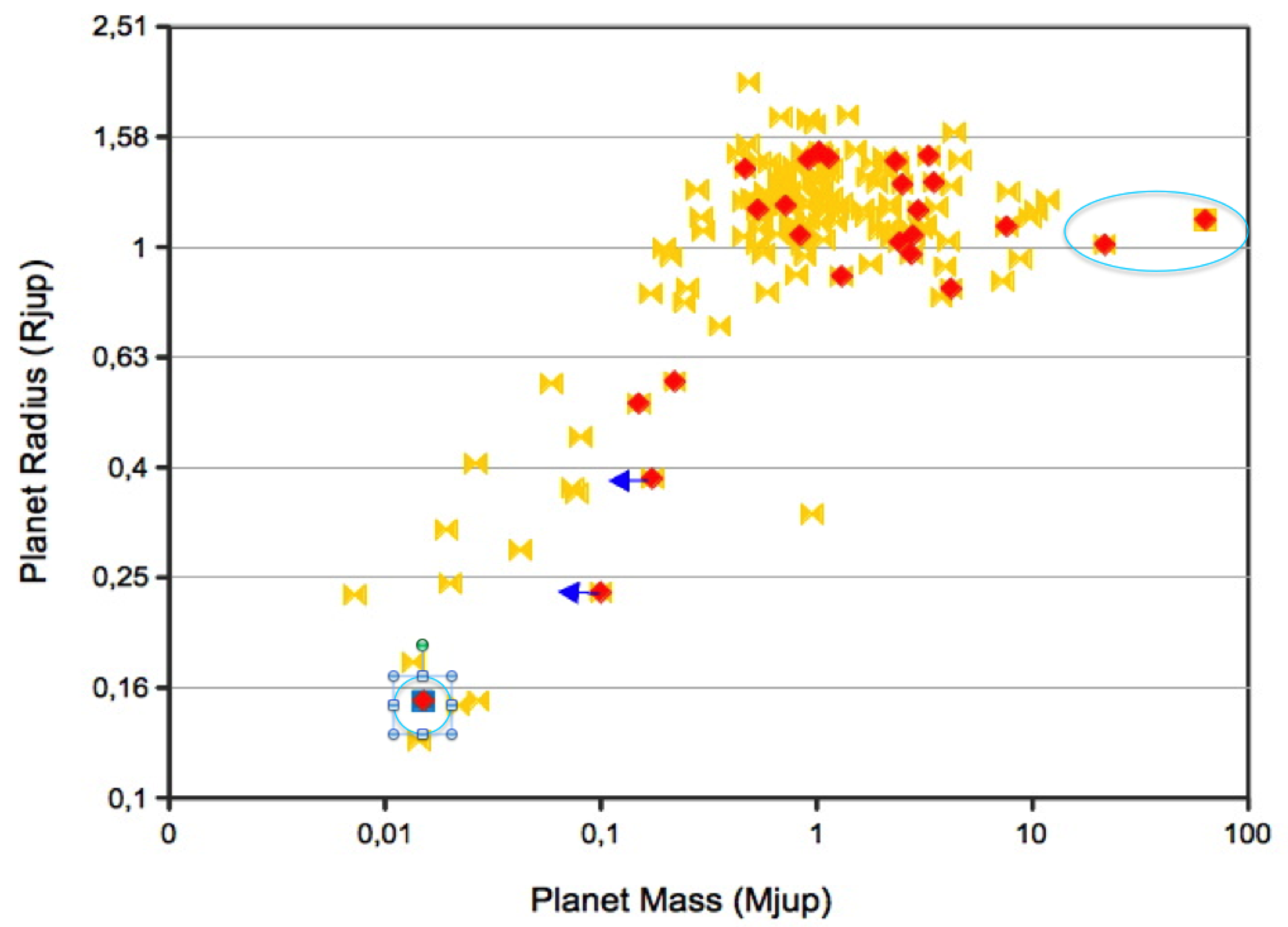
Distribution of CoRoT planets (red circles) in the Radius / Mass diagram. Yellow symbols are the other planets discovered by transit methods

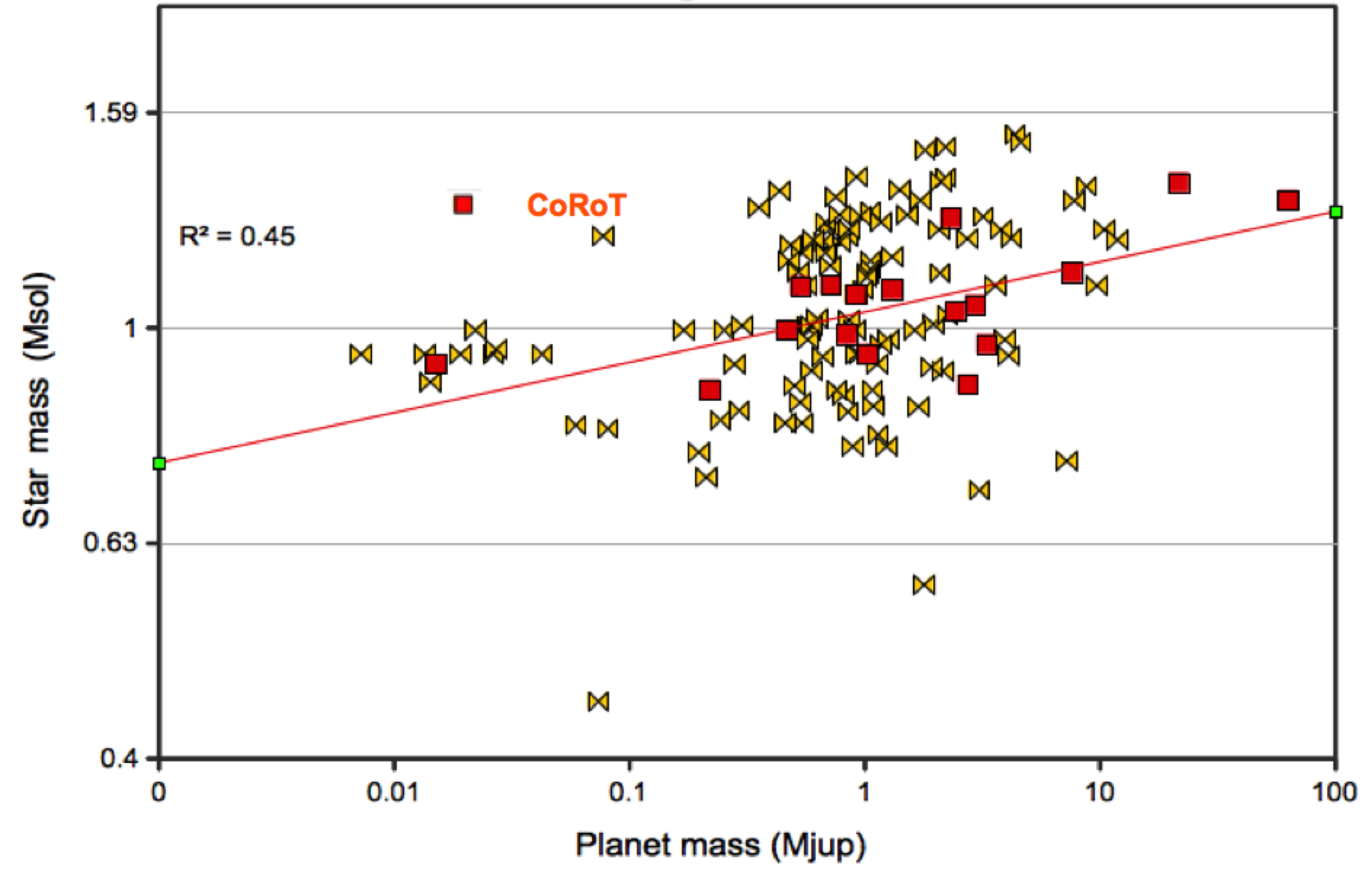
Diagram of the mass of the star as a function of the planetary mass for CoRoT planets (red) and the other planets discovered by the transit method (yellow). The line across CoRoT data indicates a trend: massive planets are found around massive stars.

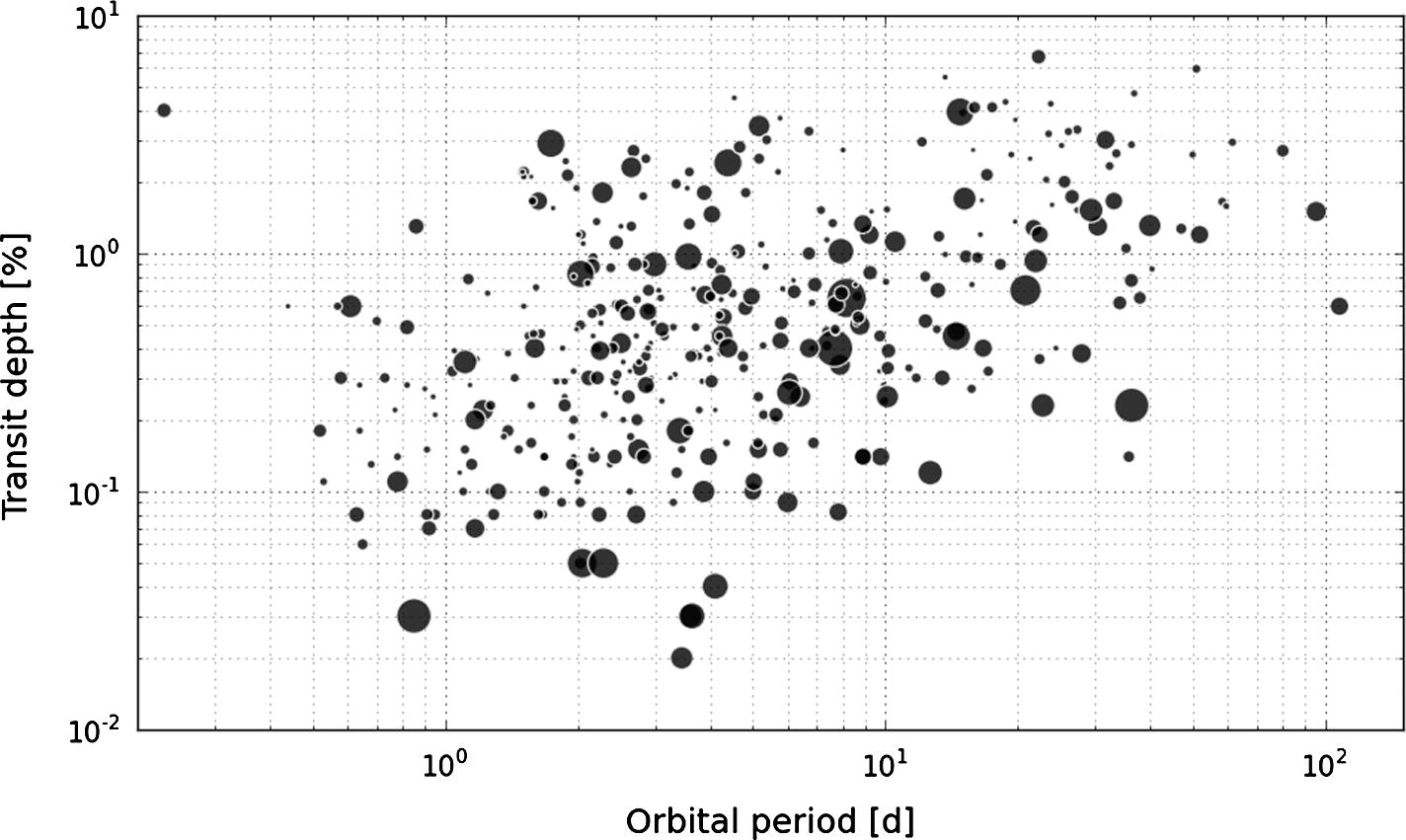
The timing and transit depth of all CoRoT planet candidates. The size of the symbols indicates the apparent brightness of its parent star (small meaning faint).

== See also ==
- Automated Planet Finder – Robotic optical telescope searching for extrasolar planets
- Darwin – 2007 European study concept of an array of space observatories
- High Accuracy Radial Velocity Planet Searcher – Instrument for detecting planets
- Kepler space telescope – NASA space telescope for exoplanetology (2009–2018)
- List of multiplanetary systems
- NASA Exoplanet Archive – Online astronomical exoplanet catalog and data service
- Space Interferometry Mission – Cancelled NASA space telescope
- Terrestrial Planet Finder – NASA concept study of an array of space telescopes
