= CoRoT-13b =

Extrasolar planet

Discovery
- Discovered by: CoRoT space telescope
- Detection method: Transit method

Orbital characteristics
- Semi-major axis: 0.051 AU (7,600,000 km)
- Eccentricity: 0
- Orbital period (sidereal): 4.03519 d 96.84456 h
- Inclination: 88.02
- Star: CoRoT-13

Physical characteristics
- Mean radius: 0.885 R_{J}
- Mass: 1.308 M_{J}

CoRoT-13b is a transiting exoplanet found by the CoRoT space telescope on 12 July 2010.

== Characteristics ==
It is an extremely hot Jupiter-like planet with an orbital period of 4.04 earth days, that is around 4257.5 light years away. It has a mass of 1.308 M_{J}, a radius of 0.9 R_{J}, and a density of 2.34 g/cm^{3}. The planet's density is extreme for its mass, implying the existence of heavy elements with a mass between about 140 and 300 M_{🜨}.

== Host star ==
CoRoT-13b orbits CoRoT-13 in the constellation of Monoceros. It is a G0V star with an effective temperature of 5,945 K (5,672 °C; 10,241 °F), a mass of 1.09 M_{☉}, a radius of 1.01 R_{☉}, and a near-solar metallicity. It has a high lithium content of +1.45 dex,^{[a]} and an estimated age between 0.12 and 3.15 Gyr. The lithium abundance of the star is consistent with its effective temperature, activity level, and age range derived from the stellar analysis.

== Notes ==
- ^{1} Meaning that compared to the Sun, the star is 10^{1.45} (≈28.18) times richer in lithium.
