= CoRoT-14b =

Hot Jupiter

Discovery
- Discovered by: CoRoT space telescope
- Detection method: Transit

Orbital characteristics
- Semi-major axis: 0.027 AU (4,000,000 km)
- Eccentricity: 0
- Orbital period (sidereal): 1.51214 d
- Inclination: 79.6
- Star: CoRoT-14

Physical characteristics
- Mean radius: 1.09 R_{J}
- Mass: 7.6 M_{J}
- Temperature: 1781 K

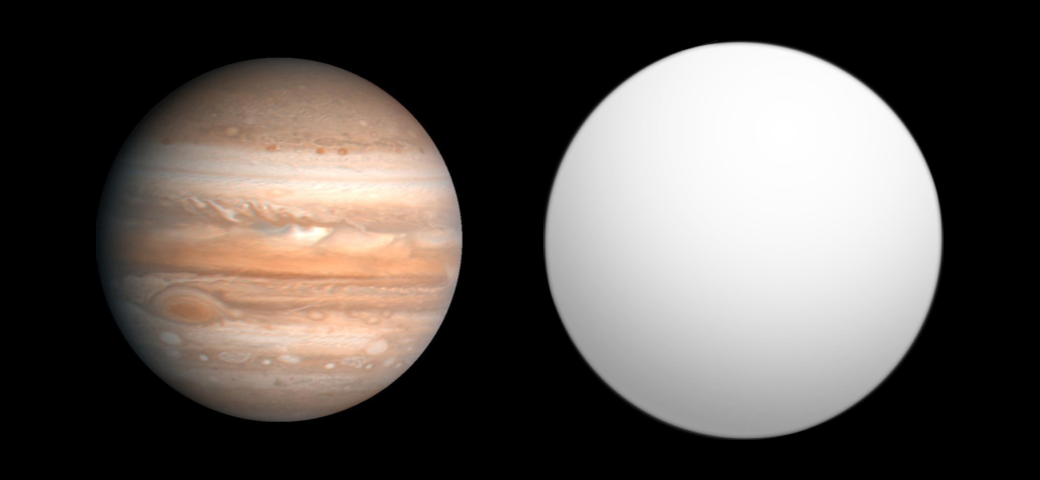
Exoplanet CoRoT-14 b size comparison to Jupiter

CoRoT-14b is a transiting Hot Jupiter exoplanet found by the CoRoT space telescope in 2010.

== Host star ==
CoRoT-14b orbits CoRoT-14 in the constellation of Monoceros. It is an F9V star with an effective temperature of 6,035 K (5,762 °C; 10,403 °F), a mass of 1.13 M_{☉}, a radius of 1.21 R_{☉}, and a near-solar metallicity. It has an estimated age between 0.4 and 8.0 Gyr.

== Characteristics ==
The planet is unusually dense (7.3 g/cm^{3}) for its mass and distance from host star, making CoRoT-14b one of the densest gas giants known.

== See also ==
- WASP-18b
- CoRoT-20b
