= CoRoT-4b =

Extrasolar planet in the constellation Monoceros

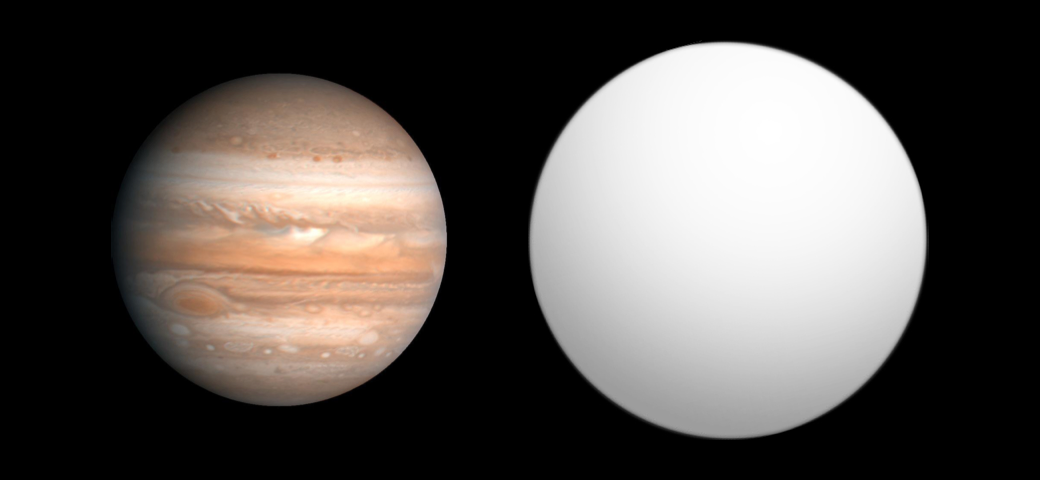
- Size comparison of CoRoT-4b with Jupiter.

Discovery
- Discovered by: Corot mission
- Discovery site: Earth's orbit
- Discovery date: 2008
- Detection method: Transit method

Orbital characteristics
- Semi-major axis: 0.090 ± 0.001 AU (13,460,000 ± 150,000 km)
- Eccentricity: 0.0 ± 0.1
- Orbital period (sidereal): 9.20205 ± 0.00037 d
- Inclination: 90
- Semi-amplitude: 63 ± 6
- Star: CoRoT-4

Physical characteristics
- Mean radius: 1.17^{+0.06}_{−0.05} R_{J}
- Mass: 0.72 ± 0.08 M_{J}
- Mean density: 0.525 ± 0.015 g/cm^{3}
- Temperature: 1074 ± 19 K

CoRoT-4b (formerly known as CoRoT-Exo-4b) is an extrasolar planet orbiting the star CoRoT-4. It is probably in synchronous orbit with stellar rotation. It was discovered by the French CoRoT mission in 2008.
