= CoRoT-24b =

Hot Neptune

Discovery
- Discovered by: CoRoT space telescope
- Discovery date: 2011
- Detection method: Transit

Designations
- Alternative names: 2MASS 06474141-0343094 b, Gaia DR2 3105404467618982272 b

Orbital characteristics
- Epoch J2000
- Semi-major axis: 0.056 ± 0.002 AU (8,380,000 ± 300,000 km)
- Eccentricity: 0
- Orbital period (sidereal): 5.1134 ± 0.0006 d
- Inclination: 86.5 ± 2.0 °
- Star: CoRoT-24

Physical characteristics
- Mean radius: 0.33 ± 0.04 R_{J}
- Mass: <0.018 M_{J}
- Mean density: <0.9 g/cm^{3}
- Surface gravity: 0.4183 G_{🜨}
- North pole right ascension: 06^{h} 47^{m} 41.41^{s}
- North pole declination: −03° 43′ 09.48″
- Temperature: 1,070 K

CoRoT-24b is a transiting exoplanet found by the CoRoT space telescope in 2011 and announced in 2014. Along with CoRoT-24c, it is one of two exoplanets orbiting CoRoT-24, making it the first multiple transiting system detected by the telescope. It is a hot Neptune orbiting at a distance of 0.056 AU from its host star.

== Properties ==
CoRoT-24b and CoRoT-24c are similar in size; however, CoRoT-24b is more than four times less massive, indicating its low density. Dr. Lammer's team modelled the planetary system and found that the atmosphere should have already evaporated a long time ago. This led to the conclusion that CoRoT-24b is not as big as previously thought, being perhaps 30 to 60 percent smaller than initially measured.
