= CoRoT-25b =

Exoplanet orbiting CoRoT-25

Discovery
- Discovered by: CoRoT
- Discovery date: 2013
- Detection method: Transit

Orbital characteristics
- Semi-major axis: 0.0578
- Eccentricity: 0
- Orbital period (sidereal): 4.9 d
- Star: CoRoT-25

Physical characteristics
- Mean radius: 1.08 R_{J}
- Mass: 0.27 M_{J}

CoRoT-25b is a gas giant exoplanet that orbits an F-type star. Its mass is 0.27 Jupiters, it takes 4.9 days to complete a single orbit of its star, and is 0.0578 AU from the star. Its discovery was announced in 2013.
