= CoRoT-15 =

F7V star with brown dwarf companion

Observation data Epoch J2000 Equinox ICRS
- Constellation: Monoceros
- Right ascension: 06^{h} 28^{m} 27.82246^{s}
- Declination: +06° 11′ 10.4519″
- Apparent magnitude (V): 16.00

Characteristics
- Evolutionary stage: Main sequence
- Spectral type: F7V

Astrometry
Proper motion (μ)	RA: -0.659 mas/yr Dec.: -3.173 mas/yr
Parallax (π)	0.7185±0.0422 mas
Distance	4,500 ± 300 ly (1,390 ± 80 pc)

Orbit
Period (P)	3.06036±0.00003 d
Semi-major axis (a)	0.045+0.014 −0.010 AU
Eccentricity (e)	0
Inclination (i)	86.7+2.3 −3.2°
Semi-amplitude (K_{1}) (primary)	7.36±0.11 km/s

Details

CoRoT-15A
Mass	1.32±0.12 M_{☉}
Radius	1.46+0.31 −0.14 R_{☉}
Surface gravity (log g)	4.3±0.2 cgs
Temperature	6350±200 K
Metallicity [Fe/H]	0.1±0.2 dex
Rotational velocity (v sin i)	19±2 km/s

CoRoT-15b
Mass	63.3±4.1 M_{Jup}
Radius	1.12+0.30 −0.15 R_{Jup}
Temperature	1740+120 −190 K

Other designations
- CoRoT-15, CoRoT 221686194, TIC 206893389, 2MASS J06282781+0611105

Database references
SIMBAD	A
- B

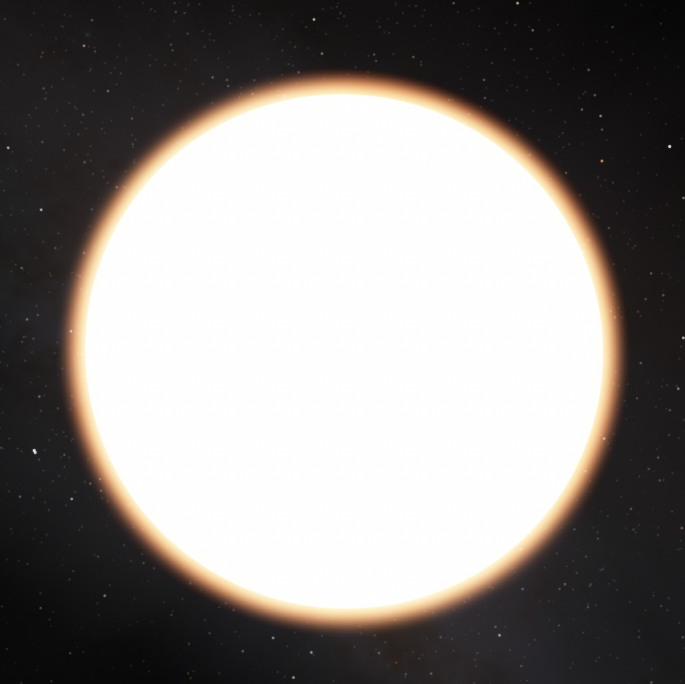
CoRoT-15, as seen in SpaceEngine

CoRoT-15 is an eclipsing binary star system about 4,500 light-years (1,400 parsecs) away in the constellation Monoceros, discovered by the CoRoT space telescope in 2010. It consists of an F7V star and an orbiting brown dwarf companion, which was one of the first transiting brown dwarfs to be discovered.

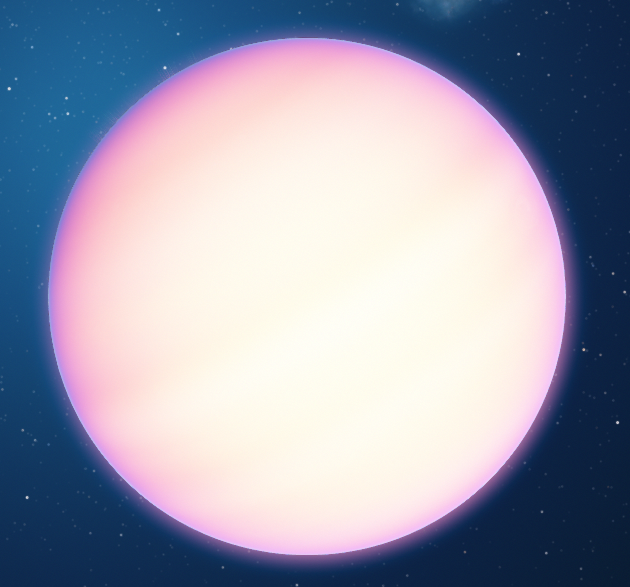
CoRoT-15b, as seen in SpaceEngine
