= CoRoT-11b =

Hot Jupiter

COROT-11b
Discovery
- Discovered by: CoRoT space telescope
- Detection method: Transit

Orbital characteristics
- Semi-major axis: 0.04351 AU (6,509,000 km)
- Eccentricity: 0
- Orbital period (sidereal): 2.99427803(49) d
- Inclination: 81.41
- Star: CoRoT-11

Physical characteristics
- Mean radius: 1.43 R_{J}
- Mass: 2.33 M_{J}
- Temperature: 1593 K

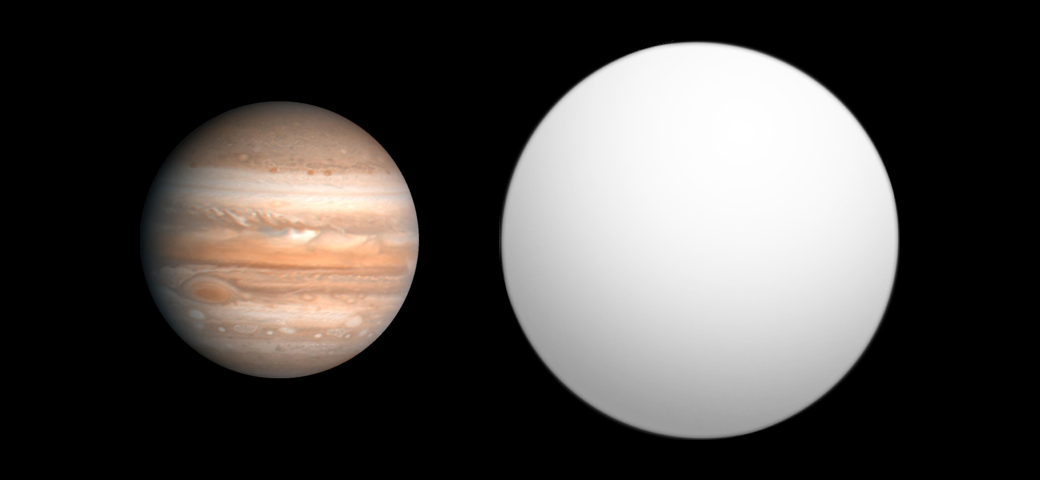
CoRoT-11 b beside Jupiter

CoRoT-11b is a transiting Hot Jupiter-sized exoplanet found by the CoRoT space telescope in 2010. From obtained light curves and Bayesian inference on the data, it is highly likely that CoRoT-11b has been observed in a secondary eclipse around its host star (transiting behind it).

== Host star ==
CoRoT-11b orbits the star CoRoT-11 in the constellation of Serpens. It is a F6V star with an effective temperature of 6440±120 K, a mass of 1.270±0.050 M_{☉}, a radius of 1.370±0.030 R_{☉}, and a near-solar metallicity of −0.03±0.08 dex. (Note: This means that the star has an iron content 1.07+0.22 −0.18 times that of the Sun.) It has an estimated age of 2.0±1.0 Gyr.
