= CoRoT-19b =

Extrasolar planet

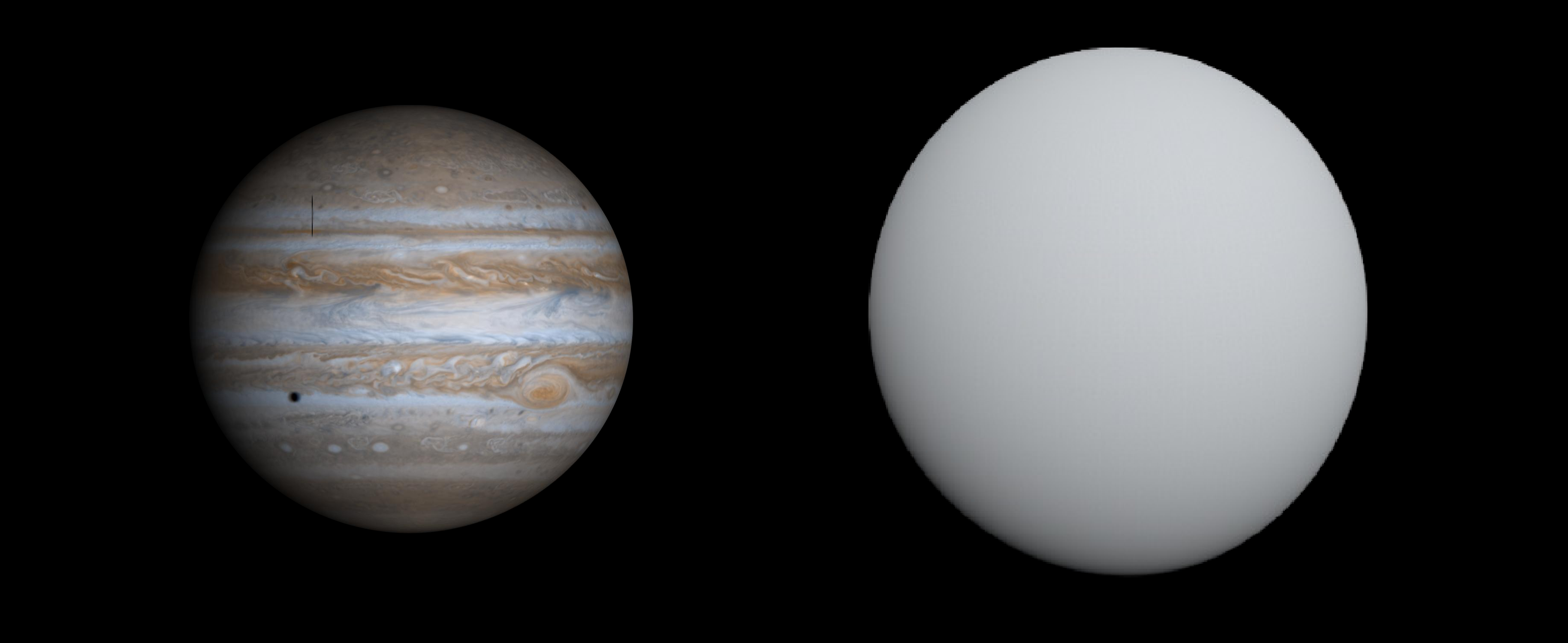
- CoRoT-19b (grey) compared to Jupiter

Discovery
- Discovered by: E. W. Gunther et al.
- Discovery site: CoRoT space telescope
- Discovery date: March 2010
- Detection method: Planetary transit

Orbital characteristics
- Epoch J2000.0
- Semi-major axis: 0.05166 ± 0.0007 AU (7,728,000 ± 105,000 km)
- Eccentricity: 0.047
- Orbital period (sidereal): 3.8971372±0.0000021 d
- Inclination: 88.0±0.7
- Time of periastron: 2,455,701.71540±0.00048 JD
- Argument of periastron: 86±60°
- Semi-amplitude: 131.5+7.5 −7.3 km/s
- Star: CoRoT-19

Physical characteristics
- Mean radius: 1.29±0.03 R_{J}
- Mass: 1.155±0.072 M_{J}
- Mean density: 0.668+0.063 −0.061 g/cm^{3}
- Temperature: 2,000 ± 150 K (3,140 ± 270 °F; 1,727 ± 150 °C)

CoRoT-19b is a transiting gas giant exoplanet. It was discovered using the transit method via CoRoT space telescope in 2010. It is a typical example of an inflated hot Jupiter, and the planet has a misaligned orbit compared to other planets.

== Observational history ==
CoRoT-19b was first dected in March 2010 following a 24-day observation of the host star's light curves. There was a 19th magnitude binary star located in proximity to CoRoT-19 that had a similar light curve to the latter. Using a photometric mask, the authors were able to filter out the background binary and determine that the light curves indeed came from CoRoT-19. Further transit data from TRAPPIST was collected following the initial observations. From the light curves, the authors were able to determine the period of the planet and radii of both objects accurately. After the initial transit observations, Guenther and colleagues determined the orbit of the planet and most of its parameters used doppler spectroscopy measurements from the SOPHIE, HARPS, SIES, and SANFORD spectrographs.

CoRoT-19b was one of 71 Jupiter-mass exoplanets whose parameters used in a 2012 study exploring factors that affect the radii of exoplanets. Some of its orbital and physical parameters were updated in 2017.

== Host star ==
The planet's host star CoRoT-19 lies in the equatorial constellation of Monoceros. It is an inactive late F-type main sequence star that has nearly depleted hydrogen in its core. It has 1.21 times the mass of the Sun, is 65% larger than the Sun, and has a near-solar metallicity. At an apparent magnitude of 14.01, CoRoT-19 can only be seen with telescopes that have an aperture of at least 130 milimeters.

== Characteristics ==
Like most hot Jupiters, CoRoT-19b orbits close to its host star at an average separation of 0.05166 AU. Its four-day orbit has an eccentricity of 0.047, meaning that it is nearly circular. The planet is only 15% more massive than Jupiter, but the irradiation from its host star causes the planet to inflate to a radius 29% larger than that of Jupiter. Compared to other hot Jupiters, CoRoT-19b is not as puffy, owing to its relatively high density of 0.71 g/cm^{3}.This value was later revised to 0.668 g/cm^{3}. CoRoT-19b's temperature was measured to be 2,000 K, although this is only its equilibrium temperature.

The planet was observed for the Rossiter-McLaughlin effect, which occurs when an object passes in front of a rotating object. After observing the effect, astronomers found that the planet's spin-orbit angle was −52°+27°
−22°. In the case of CoRoT-19b, it is only slightly mis-aligned with the equatorial plane of its host star.
