= CoRoT-24c =

Hot Neptune

Discovery
- Discovered by: CoRoT space telescope
- Discovery date: 2011
- Detection method: Transit

Designations
- Alternative names: 2MASS 06474141-0343094 c, Gaia DR2 3105404467618982272 c

Orbital characteristics
- Epoch J2000
- Semi-major axis: 0.098 ± 0.003 AU (14,660,000 ± 450,000 km)
- Eccentricity: 0
- Orbital period (sidereal): 11.759 ± 0.0063 d
- Inclination: 89.0+1.6 −1.0 °
- Star: CoRoT-24

Physical characteristics
- Mean radius: 0.44 ± 0.04 R_{J}
- Mass: 0.088 ± 0.035 M_{J}
- Mean density: 1.3+0.5 −0.4 g/cm^{3}
- Surface gravity: 1.1502 G_{🜨}
- North pole right ascension: 06^{h} 47^{m} 41.41^{s}
- North pole declination: −03° 43′ 09.48″
- Temperature: 850 K

CoRoT-24c is a transiting exoplanet found by the CoRoT space telescope in 2011 and announced in 2014. Along with CoRoT-24b, it is one of two exoplanets orbiting CoRoT-24, making it the first multiple transiting system detected by the telescope. It is a hot Neptune orbiting at a distance of 0.098 AU from its host star.
