= CoRoT-27b =

Exoplanet orbiting CoRoT-27

Discovery
- Discovered by: CoRoT
- Discovery date: 2014
- Detection method: Transit

Orbital characteristics
- Semi-major axis: 0.0476
- Eccentricity: 0.065
- Orbital period (sidereal): 3.6 d
- Star: CoRoT-27

Physical characteristics
- Mean radius: 1.007 R_{J}
- Mass: 10.39 M_{J}

CoRoT-27b is a gas giant exoplanet that orbits a G-type star. Its mass is 10.39 Jupiters, it takes 3.6 days to complete one orbit of its star, and is 0.0476 AU from its star. Its discovery was announced in 2014.

== Host star ==
CoRoT-27b orbits CoRoT-27 in the constellation of Serpens. It is a Sun-like G2V star with an effective temperature of 5,900 K (5,630 °C; 10,160 °F), a mass of 1.05 M_{☉}, a radius of 1.08 R_{☉}, and a near- or below-solar metallicity of −0.1±0.1. Its age is estimated at 4.21±2.72 Gyr.
