= CoRoT-22b =

Uranus-like exoplanet

Discovery
- Discovered by: CoRoT space telescope
- Detection method: Transit

Orbital characteristics
- Semi-major axis: 0.092 AU (13,800,000 km)
- Eccentricity: 0.077
- Orbital period (sidereal): 9.75598 d
- Inclination: 89.749
- Star: CoRoT-22

Physical characteristics
- Mean radius: 0.4354 R_{J}
- Mass: 0.06M_{J}
- Temperature: 885 K

CoRoT-22b is a transiting exoplanet smaller than Uranus found by the CoRoT space telescope in 2011 and confirmed in 2014.

== Host star ==
CoRoT-22b orbits CoRoT-22 in the constellation of Serpens. It is a G3V star with an effective temperature of 5,939 K (5,666 °C; 10,231 °F), a mass of 1.099 M_{☉}, a radius of 1.136 R_{☉}, and an above-solar metallicity of +0.170. (Note: This means that CoRoT-22 is 10^{0.170}≈1.479 times richer in iron than the Sun.) It has an estimated age of between 1.3 and 5.3 Gyr.
