= CoRoT-17b =

Extrasolar planet

Discovery
- Discovered by: CoRoT space telescope
- Discovery date: 2011
- Detection method: Transit

Designations
- Alternative names: 2MASS J18344782-0636440 b, Gaia DR2 4255957040079935488 b

Orbital characteristics
- Semi-major axis: 0.0461 ± 0.0008 AU (6,900,000 ± 120,000 km)
- Eccentricity: 0
- Orbital period (sidereal): 3.768125 ± 0.000257 d
- Inclination: 88.34 ± 1.54 °
- Star: CoRoT-17

Physical characteristics
- Mean radius: 1.02 ± 0.07 R_{J}
- Mass: 2.43 ± 0.16 M_{J}
- Mean density: 2.82 ± 0.38 g cm^{−3}
- Temperature: 1486 K

CoRoT-17b is a transiting Hot Jupiter exoplanet found by the CoRoT space telescope in 2011.

== Host star ==
CoRoT-17b orbits CoRoT-17 in the constellation of Scutum. It is a G2V star with T_{e} = 5740 K, M = 1.04 M_{☉}, R = 1.59 R_{☉}, and near-solar metallicity. It has an estimated age between 9.7 and 11.7 Gyr.
