= CoRoT-21b =

Extrasolar planet

Discovery
- Discovered by: CoRoT space telescope
- Detection method: Transit

Orbital characteristics
- Semi-major axis: 0.0417 AU (6,240,000 km)
- Eccentricity: 0
- Orbital period (sidereal): 2.72474 d
- Inclination: 86.8
- Star: CoRoT-21

Physical characteristics
- Mean radius: 1.3 R_{J}
- Mass: 2.26M_{J}
- Temperature: 1857 K

CoRoT-21b is a transiting exoplanet reportedly found by the CoRoT space telescope in 2011. Planetary parameters were published in 2012.

It is an extremely hot Jupiter-like planet with an orbital period of 2.72 earth days. It has a mass equivalent to 2.26 M_{J}, a radius of 1.3 R_{J}, and a density of 1.37 g/cm^{3}.

The planet is experiencing extreme tidal forces, forcing its orbit to decay within 800 million years from now.

== Host star ==
CoRoT-21b orbits CoRoT-21 in the constellation of Monoceros. It is an F-type subgiant star (spectral type F8IV) with an effective temperature of 6,200 K (5,930 °C; 10,700 °F), a mass of 1.29 M_{☉}, a radius of 1.945 R_{☉}, and a near-solar metallicity. It has an estimated age between 3.6 and 4.6 Gyr.
