= CoRoT-9b =

Extrasolar planet in the constellation Serpens

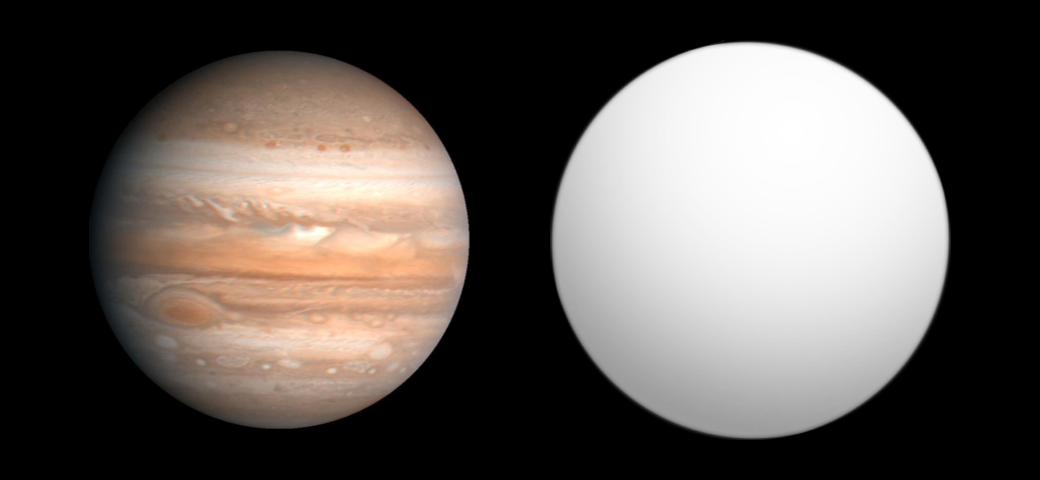
- Size comparison of CoRoT-9b with Jupiter.

Discovery
- Discovered by: Deeg et al.
- Discovery site: CoRoT spacecraft
- Discovery date: March 18, 2010
- Detection method: Transit

Orbital characteristics
- Semi-major axis: 0.407 ± 0.005 AU (60,890,000 ± 750,000 km)
- Eccentricity: 0.11 ± 0.04
- Orbital period (sidereal): 95.2738 ± 0.0014 d ~0.26084 y
- Inclination: > 89.9
- Argument of periastron: 37^{+9}_{−37}
- Star: CoRoT-9

Physical characteristics
- Mean radius: 1.05 ± 0.04 R_{J}
- Mass: 0.84 ± 0.07 M_{J}
- Mean density: 0.96 ± 0.17 g/cm^{3}
- Surface gravity: 1.93 ± 0.33 g
- Temperature: 250–430 K (−23–157 °C; −10–314 °F)

CoRoT-9b is an exoplanet orbiting the star CoRoT-9, approximately 1500 light years away in the constellation Serpens. CoRoT-9b's distance of nearest approach to its parent star of approximately 0.36 AU was the largest of all known transiting planets at the time of its discovery, with an orbital period of 95 days. The transit of this planet lasts 8 hours. The planet is at a distance from its star where there is a strong increase in albedo as the temperature decreases, because of the condensation of reflective water clouds in the atmosphere. This suggests its atmosphere may be locked into one of two states: a cloudless state with temperatures between 380 K (107 °C; 224 °F) and 430 K (157 °C; 314 °F), or covered in water clouds with a temperature in the range 250 K (−23 °C; −10 °F) to 290 K (17 °C; 62 °F).

== Discovery ==
CoRoT-9b was discovered by combining observations from the CoRoT satellite, which looks for a small dip in starlight as a planet passes in front of its parent star, and radial velocity measurements from the European Southern Observatory's High Accuracy Radial velocity Planet Searcher (HARPS) instrument on the 3.6 m Telescope. Its presence was confirmed by observations from several telescopes from the ESO. This discovery was announced in 2010 on St. Patrick's Day, after 145 days of continuous observations in summer 2008.

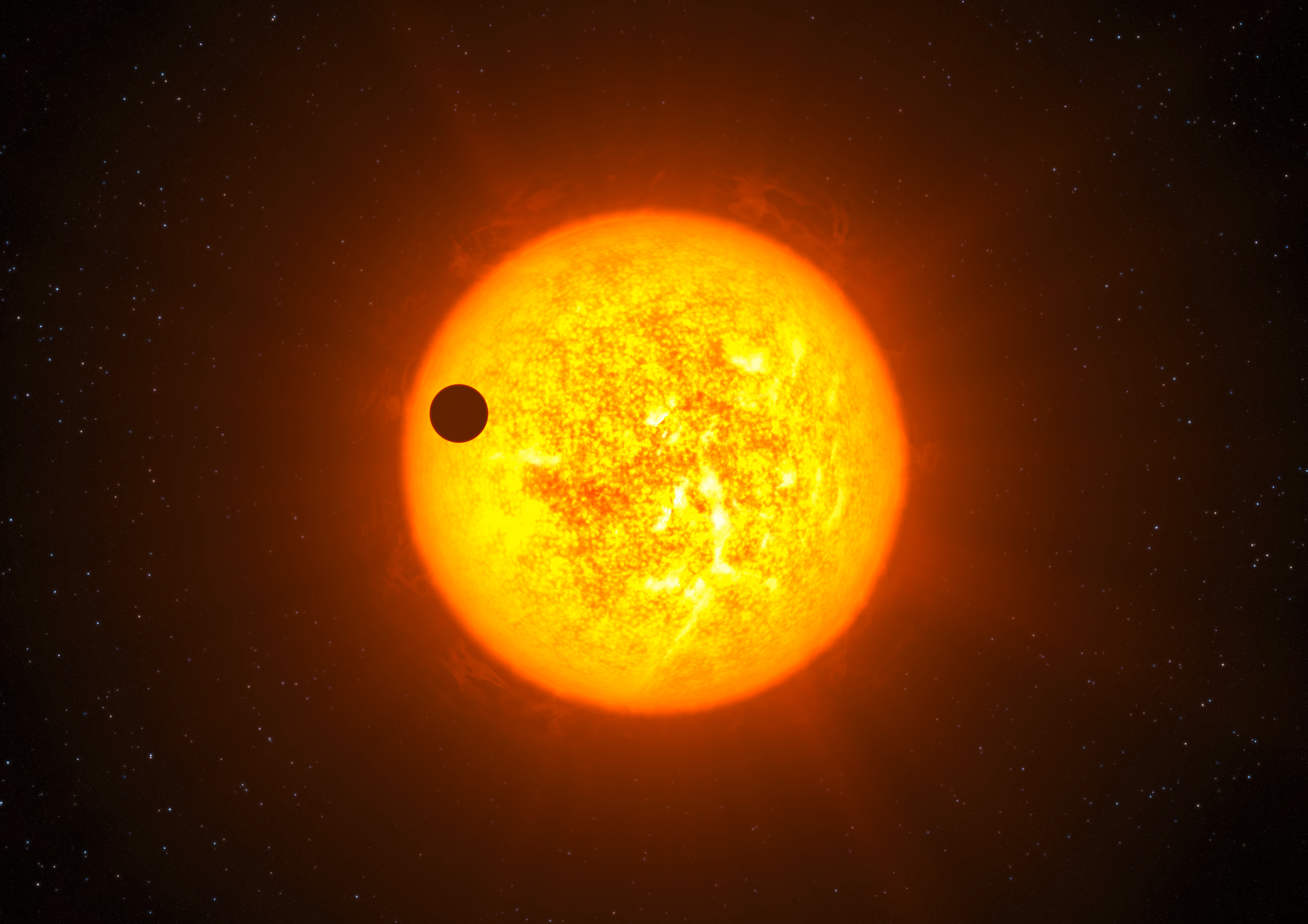
Artist's impression of the transiting exoplanet CoRoT-9b. Credit: ESO/L. Calçada.

Animation of an artist's impression.

== Mass and size ==
CoRoT-9b has a mass of 0.84 times that of Jupiter (M_{J}) as determined from HARPS spectroscopy, and has a radius of 1.05 times that of Jupiter (R_{J}) as determined from photometry of the transit light curve. This implies that this planet has a density of 96% that of water, and surface gravity 1.93 times that of Earth. A search for rings and satellites around this planet with the Spitzer space telescope was negative.

== Atmosphere and interior ==
Since CoRoT-9b is the first temperate giant exoplanet found by the transit method, astronomers will be able to study the atmosphere of a temperate giant planet for the first time, examining the composition of clouds, the composition of the atmosphere, temperature distributions, and even some details of the interior of the planet. The atmosphere of this planet is presumably dominated by hydrogen and helium (like Jupiter and Saturn), with up to 20 Earth masses of other elements including water, as well as rock at high temperatures and pressures. The authors of the CoRoT-9b discovery paper refer to the planet as a class II ("water cloud") or class III ("clear") atmosphere planet, as described by the Sudarsky extrasolar planet classification.

== See also ==
- CoRoT is a CNES space mission to discover planets using the photometric transit method. It is in polar orbit around the Earth.
- CoRoT-7b is a rocky super-Earth.
- HD 80606 b is the longest period (but much more eccentric than CoRoT-9b) transiting planet.
- GJ 1214 b is a transiting super-Earth found by MEarth Project.
