= CoRoT-4 =

Star in the constellation Monoceros

Observation data Epoch J2000 Equinox ICRS
- Constellation: Monoceros
- Right ascension: 06^{h} 48^{m} 46.7134^{s}
- Declination: −00° 40′ 21.970″
- Apparent magnitude (V): 13.45

Characteristics
- Evolutionary stage: main sequence
- Spectral type: F8V
- Apparent magnitude (R): 13.42
- Apparent magnitude (J): 12.619±0.026
- Apparent magnitude (H): 12.359±0.029
- Apparent magnitude (K): 12.29±0.03

Astrometry
Proper motion (μ)	RA: −3.659±0.049 mas/yr Dec.: −3.898±0.044 mas/yr
Parallax (π)	1.3484±0.0280 mas
Distance	2,420 ± 50 ly (740 ± 20 pc)

Details
Mass	1.16^{+0.03}_{−0.02} M_{☉}
Radius	1.17^{+0.01}_{−0.03} R_{☉}
Luminosity	1.5 L_{☉}
Surface gravity (log g)	4.42 cgs
Temperature	6,190±60 K
Metallicity [Fe/H]	0.00±0.15 dex
Rotation	8.87±1.12 d
Rotational velocity (v sin i)	6.4±1.0 km/s
Age	1^{+1.0}_{−0.3} Gyr

Other designations
- GSC 04800-02187, GSC2 S1002103169, UCAC2 31467163, CoRoT-Exo-4, 2MASS J06484671-0040219, USNO-B1.0 0893-00105986

Database references
SIMBAD	data

CoRoT-4 (formerly known as CoRoT-Exo-4) is a yellow-white dwarf main-sequence star in the constellation Monoceros.

== Planetary system ==
The star is orbited by one known extrasolar planet, designated CoRoT-4b. It was catalogued as part of the CoRoT mission to find transiting planets, when a planet was spotted using the transit method.

The CoRoT-4 planetary system
Companion (in order from star)	Mass	Semimajor axis (AU)	Orbital period (days)	Eccentricity	Inclination (°)	Radius
b	0.72±0.08 M_{J}	0.090±0.001	9.20205±0.00037	0	—	—

== See also ==
- List of extrasolar planets
