= CoRoT-12b =

Hot Jupiter

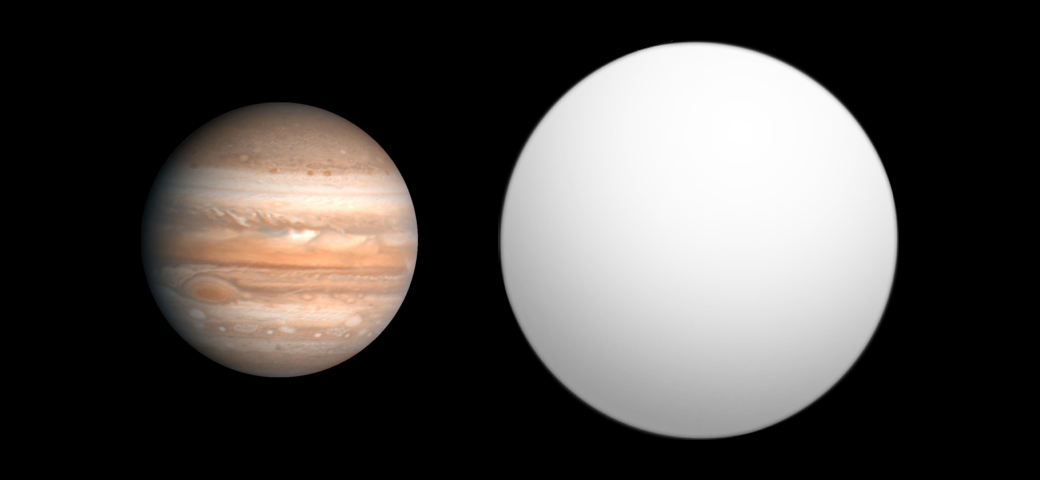
- Comparison of size of Jupiter to CoRoT-12b.

Discovery
- Discovered by: CoRoT space telescope
- Detection method: Transit

Orbital characteristics
- Semi-major axis: 0.04016 AU (6,008,000 km)
- Eccentricity: 0.07
- Orbital period (sidereal): 2.828042 d
- Inclination: 85.48
- Star: CoRoT-12

Physical characteristics
- Mean radius: 1.81±0.21 R_{J}
- Mass: 0.917M_{J}
- Temperature: 1319 K

CoRoT-12b is a transiting Hot Jupiter-sized exoplanet found by the CoRoT space telescope in 2010.

== Host star ==
CoRoT-12b orbits CoRoT-12 in the constellation of Monoceros. It is a G2V star with an effective temperature of 5,675 K (5,402 °C; 9,755 °F), a mass of 1.078 M_{☉}, a radius of 1.116 R_{☉}, and an above-solar metallicity. It has an estimated age between 3.2 and 9.4 Gyr.
