= CoRoT-18b =

Hot Jupiter

Discovery
- Discovered by: CoRoT space telescope
- Detection method: Transit

Orbital characteristics
- Semi-major axis: 0.0295 AU (4,410,000 km)
- Eccentricity: 0-0.08
- Orbital period (sidereal): 1.9000693 d
- Inclination: 86.5
- Star: CoRoT-18

Physical characteristics
- Mean radius: 1.31 R_{J}
- Mass: 3.47M_{J}
- Temperature: 1396 K

CoRoT-18b is a transiting hot Jupiter exoplanet found by the CoRoT space telescope in 2011. It orbits CoRoT-18 in the constellation of Monoceros. It is a G9V star with an effective temperature of 5,440 K (5,170 °C; 9,330 °F), a mass of 0.95 M_{☉}, a radius of 1.00 R_{☉}, and a near-solar metallicity. Its age is unknown. A 2021 study utilizing the Rossiter–McLaughlin effect has determined the planetary orbit is probably aligned with the rotational axis of the star, with a misalignment equal to -10±20°.
