= CoRoT-10b =

Extrasolar planet in the constellation Aquila

Discovery
- Discovered by: CoRoT space telescope
- Detection method: Transit

Orbital characteristics
- Semi-major axis: 0.1055 AU (15.78 million km)
- Eccentricity: 0.53
- Orbital period (sidereal): 13.2406 d
- Inclination: 88.55
- Star: CoRoT-10

Physical characteristics
- Mean radius: 0.97 R_{J}
- Mass: 2.75 M_{J}
- Temperature: 601 K

CoRoT-10b is a transiting hot Jupiter exoplanet found by the CoRoT space telescope in 2010.

== Host star ==
CoRoT-10b orbits CoRoT-10 in the constellation of Aquila. It is a K1V star with T_{e} = 5,075 K, M = 0.89 M_{☉}, R = 0.79 R_{☉}, above solar metallicity. It has an estimated age below 3.0 Gyr.
