= AA Tauri =

Star in the constellation Taurus

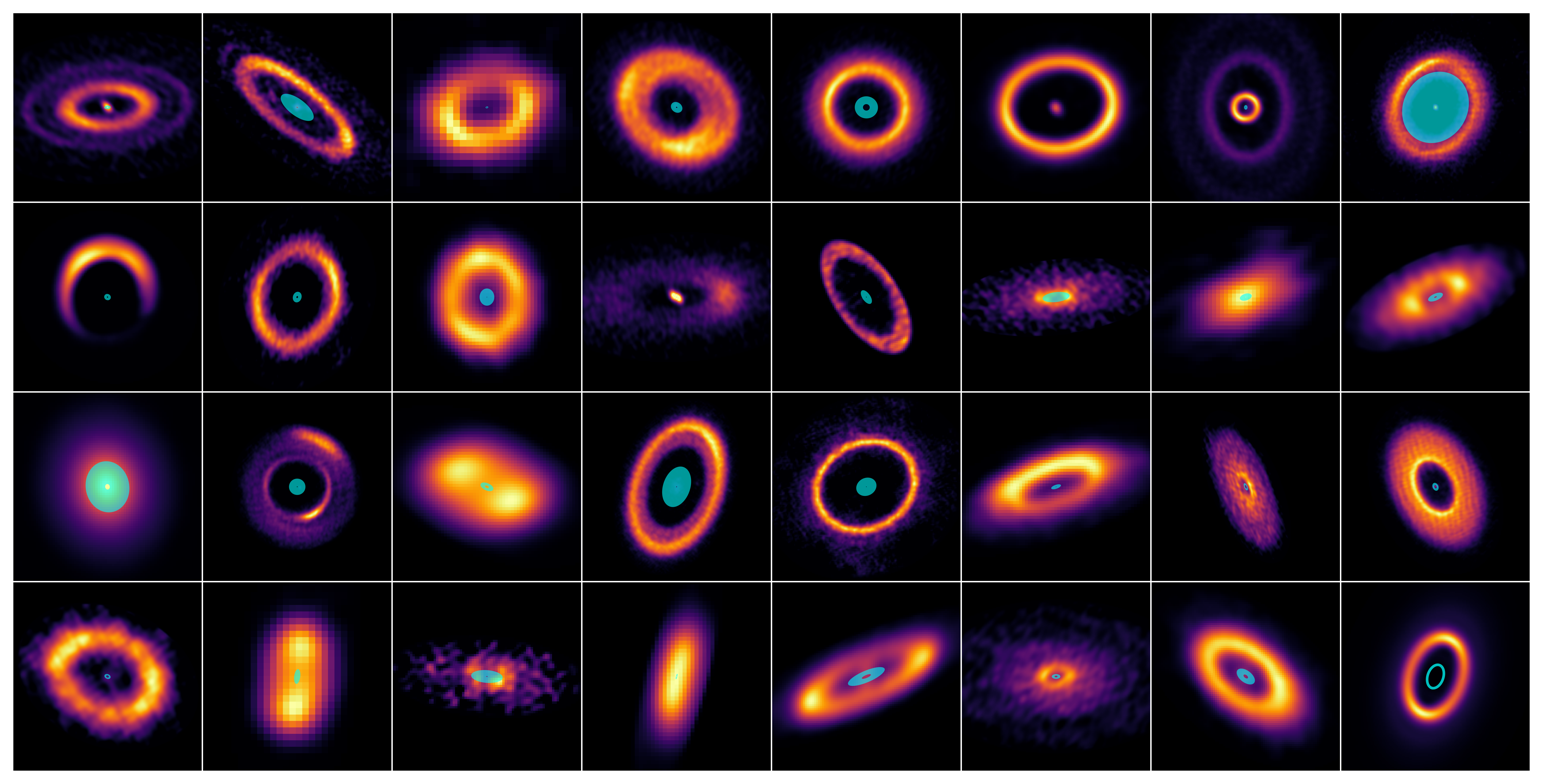
- The disk around AA Tauri imaged by ALMA

Observation data Epoch J2000.0 Equinox ICRS
- Constellation: Taurus
- Right ascension: 04^{h} 34^{m} 55.42019^{s}
- Declination: +24° 28′ 53.0336″
- Apparent magnitude (V): 12.2 to 16.1

Characteristics
- Spectral type: K7Ve
- Variable type: T Tauri-type?

Astrometry
Radial velocity (R_{v})	16.98±0.04 km/s
Proper motion (μ)	RA: +5.323 mas/yr Dec.: −20.680 mas/yr
Parallax (π)	7.4255±0.0868 mas
Distance	439 ± 5 ly (135 ± 2 pc)

Details
Mass	0.76 M_{☉}
Radius	1.81 R_{☉}
Luminosity	0.8 L_{☉}
Temperature	4,060 K
Rotational velocity (v sin i)	12.8±1.1 km/s
Age	2.4 Myr

Other designations
- AA Tau, GCRV 55202, GSC 01833-00851, IRAS F04318+2422, 2MASS J04345542+2428531, XEST 25-026, AN 196.1930, CSI+24-04319, MHA 259-17, 2E 0431.8+2422, UBV 4396, 2E 1098, XEST 25-OM-003

Database references
SIMBAD	data

AA Tauri is a young variable star in the equatorial constellation of Taurus, located in the Taurus-Auriga star-forming region. It is too faint to view with the naked eye, having an apparent visual magnitude that varies from 12.2 down to 16.1. The star is located approximately 439 light-years (135 parsecs) away from the Sun based on parallax, and is drifting further away with a radial velocity of +17 km/s.

The stellar classification for this object is K7Ve, matching a K-type main-sequence star that displays emission features. It is an eruptive variable of the T Tauri type with an estimated age of 2.4 million years. The object has 76% of the mass of the Sun, 181% of the Sun's radius, and is spinning with a projected rotational velocity of 13 km/s. AA Tauri is radiating 80% of the luminosity of the Sun at an effective temperature of 4,060 K.

== Variability ==
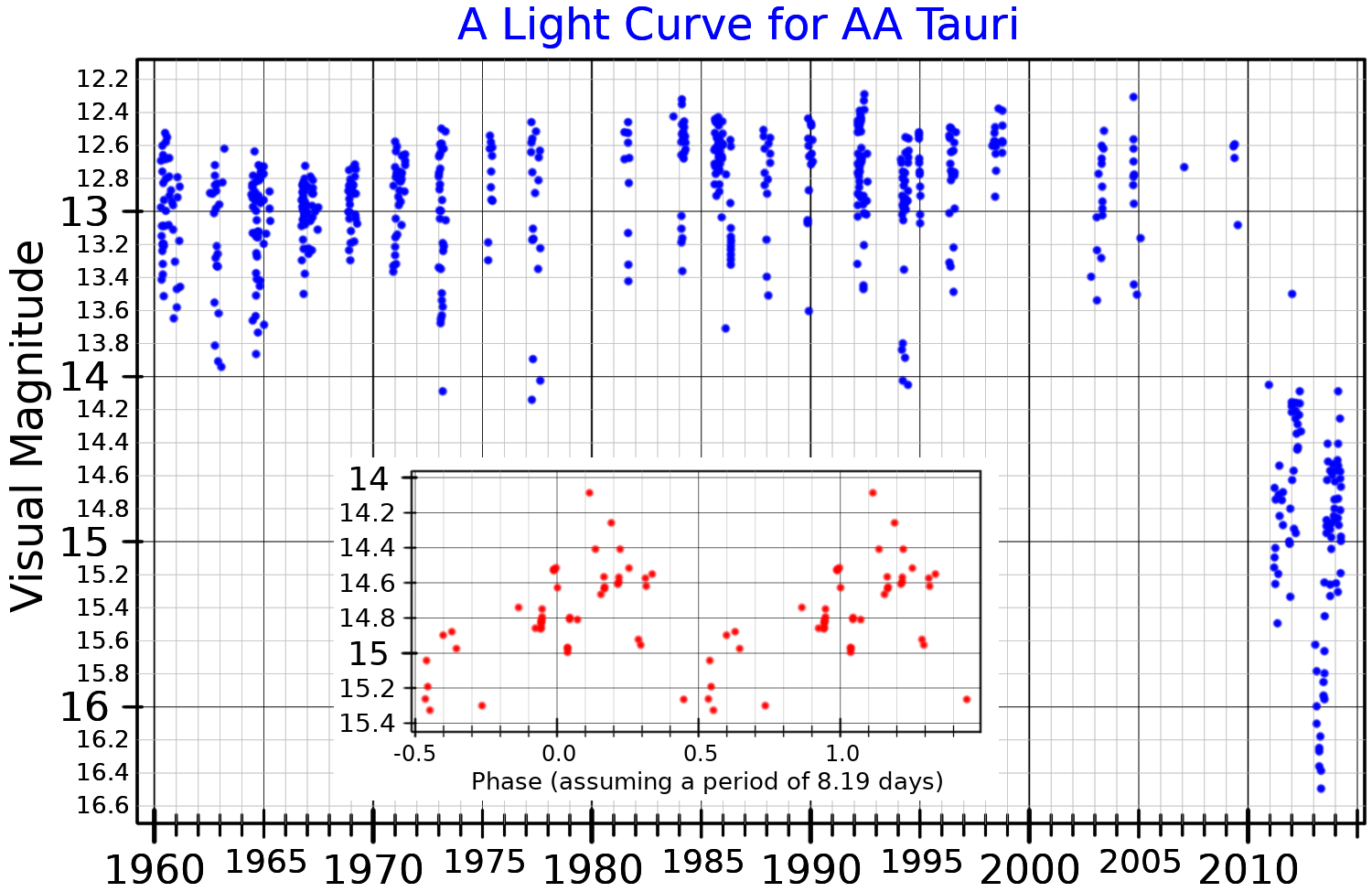
A visual band light curve for AA Tauri, adapted from Bouvier et al. (2013). The main plot shows the long term variation, and the inset plot shows the periodic variation after the dramatic dimming in 2011.

AA Tauri shows brightness variations of one to two magnitudes over an 8.2-day period. The brightness has been described as "roughly constant, interrupted by quasi-cyclic fading episodes". The periodic variations are ascribed to eclipses of the star by a warped dust disk around it.

In 2011, AA Tauri faded by about two magnitudes and has remained at the fainter level since then. The star also became significantly more reddened. The eight-day variations continue, with a maximum brightness now around magnitude 14 and magnitude 16.5 at its faintest. It is theorised that the root cause of this dimness is a warp in the accretion disk, located at a distance of 7.7 AU or more from the centre, that was brought into the line of sight by its elliptical motion around the central star.

== Search for companions ==
In their 2003 paper, Bouvier et al. invoked the possible presence of a substellar object to explain peculiar and periodic eclipses occurring to the young star every 8.3 days, though they considered it unlikely that such a companion could be responsible for said variability. They inferred a mass of 20 times that of Jupiter for the perturbing object and an orbital separation of 0.08 Astronomical Units. Later studies found no evidence for a planet, instead finding multiple rings with accretion streams between them.

Gaia astrometry shows evidence of a proper motion anomaly, suggesting the presence of a stellar companion.
