= HR 6902 =

Star system in the constellation Ophiuchus

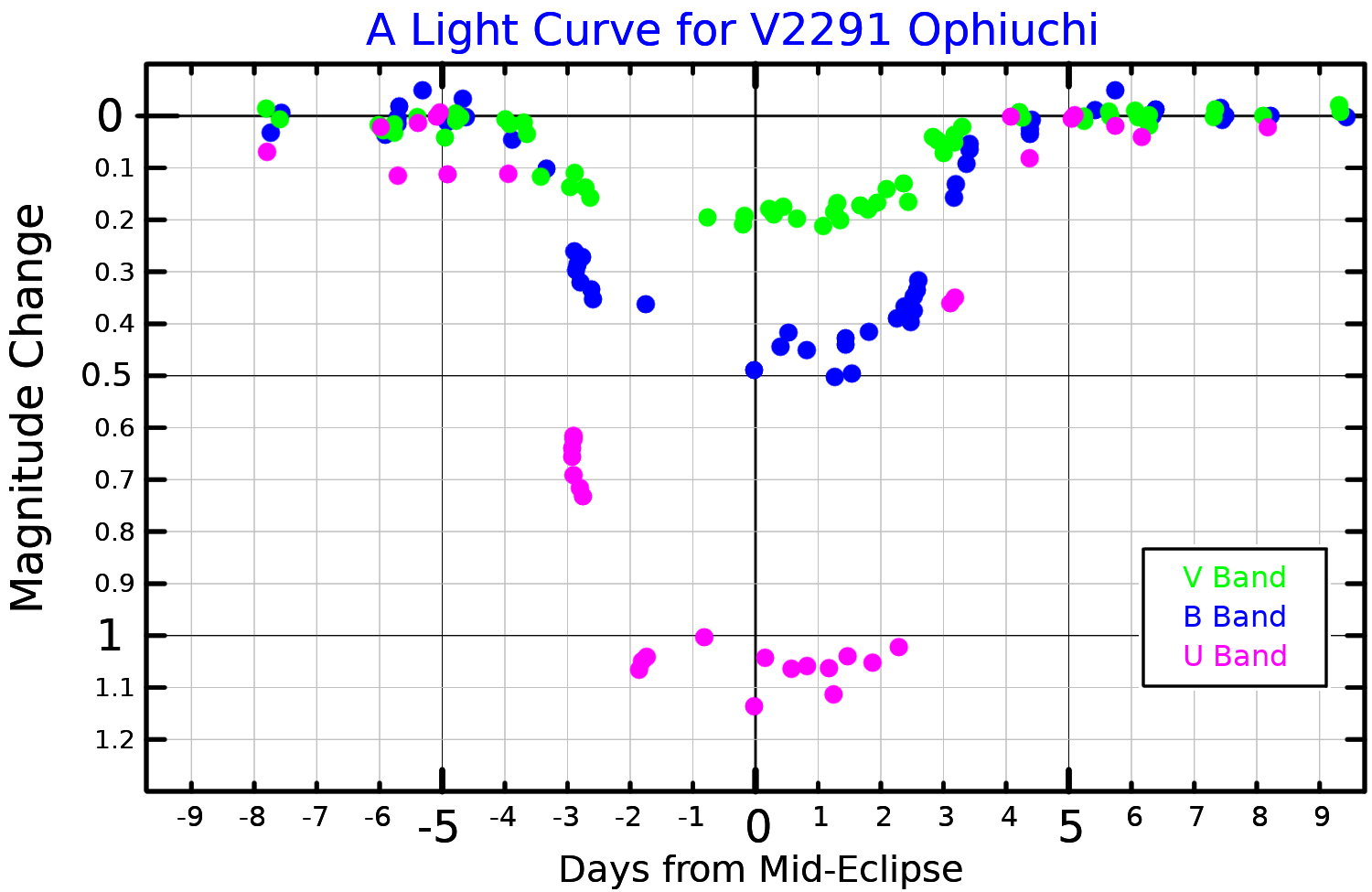
- Visible, blue and ultraviolet light curves for an eclipse of V2291 Ophiuchi, adapted from Griffin et al. (1995)

Observation data Epoch J2000 Equinox ICRS
- Constellation: Ophiuchus
- Right ascension: 18^{h} 25^{m} 38.799^{s}
- Declination: +08° 01′ 55.23″
- Apparent magnitude (V): +5.64

Characteristics
- Spectral type: G9IIb / B8V
- Variable type: Zeta Aurigae-type

Astrometry
Proper motion (μ)	RA: −3.920 mas/yr Dec.: −6.549 mas/yr
Parallax (π)	3.7061±0.1604 mas
Distance	880 ± 40 ly (270 ± 10 pc)
Absolute magnitude (M_{V})	–1.33

Orbit
Period (P)	1.055 yr
Semi-major axis (a)	1.96 AU
Eccentricity (e)	0.311
Inclination (i)	87°

Details
Mass	3.86/2.95 M_{☉}
Radius	33/3 R_{☉}
Luminosity	562/146 L_{☉}
Temperature	4,900/11,600 K

Other designations
- V2291 Oph, GSC 01023-02454, HD 169690, HD 169689, 2MASS J18253880+0801551, BD+07 3682, FK5 1478, PPM 165790, HIP 90313, SAO 123462

Database references
SIMBAD	data

HR 6902 (also designated V2291 Oph) is a binary system located 880 light years away from the Sun in the constellation Ophiuchus. The system includes an orange bright giant star and a B-type main sequence star, forming an eclipsing binary of Zeta Aurigae type. The system is also surrounded by a warm circumstellar envelope and the spectra show silicon and carbon absorption up to a distance of 3.3 giant radii.
