= List of star systems within 100–150 light-years =

This is a list of star systems within 100–150 light years of Earth.

== List ==
Key
| # | Visible to the unaided eye |
| $ | Bright star (absolute magnitude of +8.5 or brighter) |
| ‡ | White dwarf |
| § | Brown dwarf or sub-brown dwarf |
| * | Nearest in constellation |

| System | Star or (sub-) brown dwarf | Distance (ly) | Constellation | Coordinates: RA, Dec (Ep J2000, Eq J2000) | Stellar class | Apparent magnitude (V) | Parallax (mas) | Notes and additional references |
|---|---|---|---|---|---|---|---|---|
| Cor Caroli (Alpha² Canum Venaticorum) | | 99.77±0.46 | Canis Venatici | 12^{h} 56^{m} 01.67^{s} +38° 19′ 06.15″ | A0 II-IIIp SiEuCr | 2.88 | 32.7227±0.5844 | |
| COCONUTS-3 (WISE J0813-1522) | A | 100.7 | | | M5 | | | |
| COCONUTS-3 (WISE J0813-1522) | B | 100.7 | | | L6 | | | |
| Lambda Geminorum | | 100.9 ± 0.6 | Gemini | 07^{h} 18^{m} 05.58012^{s} +16° 32′ 25.3964″ | A3V | +3.571 | | |
| Beta Delphini (Rotanev) | A | 101 ± 1 | Delphinus | 20^{h} 37^{m} 32.94130^{s} +14° 35′ 42.3195″ | F5 III | 3.617±0.016 | | |
| Beta Delphini (Rotanev) | B | 101 ± 1 | Delphinus | 20^{h} 37^{m} 32.94130^{s} +14° 35′ 42.3195″ | F5 IV | | | |
| 2MASSW J0920122+351742 | A | 101 ± 2 | Lynx | 09^{h} 20^{m} 12.237^{s} +35° 17′ 42.97″ | L5.5 | | | |
| 2MASSW J0920122+351742 | B | 101 ± 2 | Lynx | 09^{h} 20^{m} 12.237^{s} +35° 17′ 42.97″ | L9 | | | |
| Alpha Gruis (Alnair) | | 101.0 ± 0.7 | Grus | 22^{h} 08^{m} 13.98473^{s} −46° 57′ 39.5078″ | B6 V | +1.74 | | |
| Iota Draconis (Edasich) | | 101.2 ± 0.3 | Draco | 15^{h} 24^{m} 55.77463^{s} +58° 57′ 57.8344″ | K2III | 3.290 | | |
| Xi Cephei (Kurhah) | Ba | 101.34 ± 0.06 | Cepheus | 22^{h} 03^{m} 47.440^{s} +64° 37′ 40.70″ | A3Vm | 4.45 | | |
| Xi Cephei (Kurhah) | Bb | 101.34 ± 0.06 | Cepheus | 22^{h} 03^{m} 47.440^{s} +64° 37′ 40.70″ | F2III | | | |
| HD 50554 | | 101.34 ± 0.08 | | 06^{h} 54^{m} 42.82615^{s} +24° 14′ 44.0057″ | F8V | +6.84 | | Has one confirmed exoplanet (HD 50554b). |
| K2-239 | | 101.51 ± 0.06 | | 10^{h} 42^{m} 22.6343^{s} +04° 26′ 28.886″ | M3V | +14.549 | | Has 3 exoplanets. |
| HD 221420 | | 101.6 ± 0.1 | | 23^{h} 33^{m} 19.5789^{s} −77° 23′ 07.194″ | G2 IV-V | 5.81±0.01 | | Has one confirmed exoplanet (HD 221420b). |
| TOI-700 | | 101.61 ± 0.07 | | 06^{h} 28^{m} 22.97^{s} −65° 34′ 43.01″ | M2V | +13.10±0.01 | | Has 4 exoplanets. |
| Alpha² Capricorni (Algedi) | | 102 ± 1 | Capricornus | 20^{h} 18^{m} 03.25595^{s} −12° 32′ 41.4684″ | G8.5III-IV | +3.57 | | |
| Xi Cephei (Kurhah) | | 102 ± 3 | Cepheus | 22^{h} 03^{m} 47.440^{s} +64° 37′ 40.70″ | F8V | 6.34 | | |
| HD 162020 | | 102.4 ± 0.2 | | 17^{h} 50^{m} 38.35575^{s} −40° 19′ 06.0723″ | K3V | 9.10 | | |
| Alpha Lacertae (Stellio) | | 102.6 ± 0.4 | Lacerta | 22^{h} 31^{m} 17.50131^{s} +50° 16′ 56.9682″ | A1 V | 3.76 | | |
| TOI-2119 | A | 102.68 ± 0.08 | | 16^{h} 17^{m} 43.2055^{s} +26° 18′ 15.053″ | M | 12.36 | | |
| TOI-2119 | B | 102.68 ± 0.08 | | 16^{h} 17^{m} 43.2055^{s} +26° 18′ 15.053″ | L | | | |
| HR 5183 | | 102.7 | | 13^{h} 46^{m} 57^{s} +06° 20′ 59″ | G0V | | | Has one confirmed exoplanet (HR 5183b). |
| Gamma Ophiuchi (Bake-eo) | | 102.8 ± 0.7 | Ophiuchus | 17^{h} 47^{m} 53.55973^{s} +02° 42′ 26.2000″ | A0 V or A1VnkA0mA0 | +3.753 | | |
| HR 858 | A | 103.4 ± 0.1 | | 02^{h} 51^{m} 56.246^{s} −30° 48′ 52.26″ | F6V | +6.382 | | Has 3 exoplanets. |
| HR 858 | B | 103.4 ± 0.1 | | 02^{h} 51^{m} 56.246^{s} −30° 48′ 52.26″ | M | | | Has 3 exoplanets. |
| HD 37124 | | 103.4 ± 0.2 | | 05^{h} 37^{m} 02.4867^{s} +20° 43′ 50.8346″ | G4IV-V | 7.68 | | Has three confirmed exoplanet (HD 37124b, c & d). |
| Alkaid (Eta Ursae Majoris) | | 103.9 ± 0.8 | Ursa Major | 13^{h} 47^{m} 32.43776^{s} +49° 18′ 47.7602″ | B3 V | +1.86 | | |
| CFBDSIR J145829+101343 | A | 104 ± 8 | | 14^{h} 58^{m} 29.0^{s} +10° 13′ 43″ | T9 | | | |
| CFBDSIR J145829+101343 | B | 104 ± 8 | | 14^{h} 58^{m} 29.0^{s} +10° 13′ 43″ | Y0V | | | |
| CWISE J0506+0738 | A | 104+13 −9 | | 05^{h} 06^{m} 26.94^{s} +07° 38′ 43.6″ | L8γ | | | |
| CWISE J0506+0738 | B | 104+13 −9 | | 05^{h} 06^{m} 26.94^{s} +07° 38′ 43.6″ | T0γ | | | |
| HD 130322 (Mönch) | | 104.08 ± 0.09 | | 14^{h} 47^{m} 32.7262^{s} −00° 16′ 53.308″ | K0V | 8.04 | | |
| Gamma Mensae | | 104.9 ± 0.5 | Mensa | 05^{h} 31^{m} 53.01393^{s} −76° 20′ 27.4779″ | K2 III | 5.19 | | |
| Delta Andromedae | Aa$ | 105.5±0.5 | Andromeda | 00^{h} 39^{m} 19.67518^{s} +30° 51′ 39.6783″ | K3III | 3.28# | 30.91±0.15 | |
| Delta Andromedae | Ab | 105.5±0.5 | Andromeda | 00^{h} 39^{m} 19.67518^{s} +30° 51′ 39.6783″ | K4 ± 2 | 3.28# | 30.91±0.15 | |
| Delta Andromedae | B | 105.5±0.5 | Andromeda | 00^{h} 39^{m} 19.67518^{s} +30° 51′ 39.6783″ | M3 | 3.28# | 30.91±0.15 | |
| HD 110067 | | 105.09 ± 0.08 | | 12^{h} 39^{m} 21.50369^{s} +20° 01′ 40.0360″ | K0V | 8.43 | | Has Six confirmed exoplanets (HD 110067b, c, d, e, f & g). |
| HD 63765 (Tapecue) | | 106.06 ± 0.06 | | 07^{h} 47^{m} 49.720^{s} −54° 15′ 50.92″ | G9V | 8.10 | | Has one confirmed exoplanet (HD 63765/Yvaga). |
| Cor Caroli (Alpha¹ Canum Venaticorum) | | 106.5 ± 0.2 | Canis Venatici | 12^{h} 56^{m} 01.66622^{s} +38° 19′ 06.1541″ | F2V | 5.60 | | |
| Gamma² Sagittarii (Alnasl) | | 106.2+1.6 −1.5 | Sagittarius | 18^{h} 05^{m} 48.484^{s} −30° 25′ 26.50″ | K0III | +2.96 | | |
| Epsilon Ophiuchi (Yed Posterior) | | 106.9 ± 0.7 | Ophiuchus | 16^{h} 18^{m} 19.28974^{s} −04° 41′ 33.0345″ | G9.5 IIIb | 3.220 | | |
| 109 Piscium | | 108.2 ± 0.1 | Pisces | 01^{h} 44^{m} 55.8255^{s} +20° 04′ 59.337″ | G3 Va | 6.27 | | Has one known exoplanet. |
| Eta Antliae | | 108.5 ± 0.3 | Antlia | 09^{h} 58^{m} 52.275^{s} −35° 53′ 27.50″ | F1 V | 5.222 | | |
| Gamma Geminorum (Alhena) | A | 109 ± 8 | Gemini | 06^{h} 37^{m} 42.71050^{s} +16° 23′ 57.4095″ | A1IV | +1.915 | | |
| Gamma Geminorum (Alhena) | B | 109 ± 8 | Gemini | 06^{h} 37^{m} 42.71050^{s} +16° 23′ 57.4095″ | G | | | |
| GD 165 | A | 109.0 ± 0.2 | | 14^{h} 24^{m} 39.144^{s} 09° 17′ 13.98″ | DA4 | | | |
| GD 165 | B | 109.0 ± 0.2 | | 14^{h} 24^{m} 39.144^{s} 09° 17′ 13.98″ | L4 | | | |
| HD 23079 (Tupi) | | 109.22 ± 0.07 | | 03^{h} 39^{m} 43.09600^{s} −52° 54′ 57.0174″ | F9.5V | 7.12 | | Has two confirmed exoplanets (HD 23079 b/Guarani). |
| HD 85390 (Natasha) | | 109.4 ± 0.1 | | 09^{h} 50^{m} 02.4969^{s} −49° 47′ 24.958″ | K1.5V | 8.54 | | Has one confirmed exoplanet (HD 85390 b/Madalitso). |
| Epsilon Virginis (Vindemiatrix) | | 109.6 ± 0.5 | Virgo | 13^{h} 02^{m} 10.59785^{s} +10° 57′ 32.9415″ | G8 III | +2.826 | | |
| 53 Eridani (Sceptrum) | | 110 ± 1 | Eridanus | 04^{h} 38^{m} 10.82486^{s} −14° 18′ 14.4600″ | K1III | +3.87 | | |
| Zeta Eridani (Zibal) | | 110 ± 1 | Eridanus | 03^{h} 15^{m} 50.02656^{s} −08° 49′ 11.0220″ | kA4hA9mA9V | 4.80 | | |
| HR 2562 | | 110.92 ± 0.16 | | 06^{h} 50^{m} 01.02^{s} −60° 14′ 56.92″ | F5V | | | Has one known exoplanet. |
| EK Draconis | | 111 | Draco | 14^{h} 39^{m} 00.210^{s} +64° 17′ 29.98″ | G1.5V | | | |
| CWISE J054129.32–745021.5 | | 111 | | | M | | | Has one known exoplanet. |
| SDSS J020742.48+000056.2 | | 111 | | | T4.5 | | | |
| HD 4208 (Cocibolca) | | 111.2 ± 0.1 | | 00^{h} 44^{m} 26.65067^{s} –26° 30′ 56.4555″ | G7V Fe-1 CH-0.5 | 7.78 | | Has one confirmed exoplanet (HD 4208 b/Xolotlan). |
| Beta Coronae Borealis (Nusakan) | A | 112 ± 3 | Corona Borealis | 15^{h} 27^{m} 49.7308^{s} +29° 06′ 20.530″ | A9SrEuCr | 3.65 to 3.72 | | |
| Beta Coronae Borealis (Nusakan) | B | 112 ± 3 | Corona Borealis | 15^{h} 27^{m} 49.7308^{s} +29° 06′ 20.530″ | F2 | | | |
| Xi Draconis (Grumium) | | 112.5 ± 0.5 | Draco | 17^{h} 53^{m} 31.72962^{s} +56° 52′ 21.5143″ | K2 III | 3.75 | | |
| BD−17 63 (Felixvarela) | | 112.58 ± 0.08 | | 00^{h} 28^{m} 34.306^{s} −16° 13′ 34.84″ | K4V(k) | 9.62 | | |
| Mu Pegasi (Sadalbari) | | 112.7 ± 0.7 | Pegasus | 22^{h} 50^{m} 00.19307^{s} +24° 36′ 05.6926″ | G8 III | 3.514 | | |
| Kappa Persei (Misam) | | 112.7 ± 0.8 | Perseus | 03^{h} 09^{m} 29.77156^{s} +44° 51′ 27.1463″ | G9.5 IIIb | 3.80 | | |
| Delta Aquarii (Skat) | | 113 ± 3 | Aquarius | 22^{h} 54^{m} 39.0125^{s} −15° 49′ 14.953″ | A3Vp | 3.28 | | |
| Beta Carinae (Miaplacidus) | | 113.2 ± 0.4 | Carina | 09^{h} 13^{m} 11.97746^{s} −69° 43′ 01.9473″ | A1 III | +1.69 | | |
| Phi² Orionis | | 113.8 ± 0.7 | Orion | 05^{h} 36^{m} 54.389^{s} +09° 17′ 26.42″ | G8 III-IV | +4.081 | | |
| HD 45652 (Lusitânia) | | 113.85 ± 0.09 | | 06^{h} 29^{m} 13.19200^{s} +10° 56′ 02.0059″ | G8-K0 | 8.10 | | Has one confirmed exoplanet (HD 45652 b/Viriato). |
| HD 73344 | | 114.94 ± 0.09 | | 08^{h} 38^{m} 45.52054^{s} +23° 41′ 09.2561″ | F6V | 6.876±0.032 | | Has three confirmed exoplanet (HD 73344b, c & d). |
| NLTT 12758 | A | 115±0.1 | | 04^{h} 12^{m} 26.327^{s} −11° 17′ 47.28″ | D | | | One of the closest type Ia supernova candidate to Earth. |
| NLTT 12758 | B | 115±0.1 | | 04^{h} 12^{m} 26.327^{s} −11° 17′ 47.28″ | D | | | One of the closest type Ia supernova candidate to Earth. |
| Iota Cephei | | 115.3 ± 0.4 | Cepheus | 22^{h} 49^{m} 40.817^{s} +66° 12′ 01.46″ | K0III | | | |
| Zeta Pictoris | | 116.5 ± 1.0 | Pictor | 05^{h} 19^{m} 22.13501^{s} −50° 36′ 21.4817″ | F6 IV | +5.43 | | |
| HD 20781 | | 117.3 ± 0.1 | | 03^{h} 20^{m} 02.94286^{s} −28° 47′ 01.7905″ | K0V | +8.48 | | Has 4 exoplanets. |
| HD 44120 | A | 117.51 ± 0.07 | | 06^{h} 16^{m} 18.786^{s} −59° 12′ 48.61″ | F9.5V | 6.44 + 14.03 | | |
| HD 44120 | B | 117.51 ± 0.07 | | 06^{h} 16^{m} 18.786^{s} −59° 12′ 48.61″ | DB3.2 | | | |
| 2M1510 C (2MASS J15104761–2818234) | | 118 ± 2 | | 15^{h} 10^{m} 47.60^{s} −28° 18′ 23.4″ | M9γ | | | |
| Gamma Equulei | | 118 ± 3 | Equuleus | 21^{h} 10^{m} 20.50005^{s} +10° 07′ 53.6763″ | A9VpSrCrEu | 4.58 - 4.77 | | |
| Phi Virginis (Elgafar) | | 118 ± 4 | Virgo | 14^{h} 28^{m} 12.13894^{s} −02° 13′ 40.6579″ | G2 IV | +4.81 | | |
| HD 7199 (Emiw) | | 118.0 ± 0.1 | | 01^{h} 10^{m} 47.22139^{s} −66° 11′ 17.3901″ | K1IV | 8.06 | | |
| WD 1054–226 (LP 849-31) | | 118.0 ± 0.2 | | 10^{h} 56^{m} 38.63^{s} −22° 52′ 56.08″ | DAZ | 16.0 | | |
| Kepler-444 | B | 118.1 ± 0.2 | | A: 19^{h} 19^{m} 00.5489^{s} +41° 38′ 04.582″ B/C: 19^{h} 19^{m} 00.3922^{s} +41° 38′ 04.013″ | K0V | | | Has 5 exoplanets. |
| Kepler-444 | C | 118.1 ± 0.2 | | A: 19^{h} 19^{m} 00.5489^{s} +41° 38′ 04.582″ B/C: 19^{h} 19^{m} 00.3922^{s} +41° 38′ 04.013″ | M | | | Has 5 exoplanets. |
| Kepler-444 | A | 119.22 ± 0.05 | | A: 19^{h} 19^{m} 00.5489^{s} +41° 38′ 04.582″ B/C: 19^{h} 19^{m} 00.3922^{s} +41° 38′ 04.013″ | K0V | +8.86 | | Has 5 exoplanets. |
| Mu² Boötis | A | 119.81 ± 0.07 | Boötes | 15^{h} 24^{m} 30.86726^{s} +37° 20′ 50.2761″ | F9V | | | |
| Mu² Boötis | B | 119.85 ± 0.08 | Boötes | 15^{h} 24^{m} 30.86726^{s} +37° 20′ 50.2761″ | G0V | | | |
| 2M1510 (2MASS J15104761–2818234) | A | 120 ± 1 | | 15^{h} 10^{m} 47.86^{s} −28° 18′ 17.5″ | M9γ | | | Has one unconfirmed exoplanets that is in an unusual polar orbit between the star and brown dwarf. |
| 2M1510 (2MASS J15104761–2818234) | B | 120 ± 1 | | 15^{h} 10^{m} 47.86^{s} −28° 18′ 17.5″ | L1β(?) | | | Has one unconfirmed exoplanets that is in an unusual polar orbit between the star and brown dwarf. |
| HD 141399 | | 120.85 ± 0.07 | | 15^{h} 46^{m} 53.8132^{s} +46° 59′ 10.543″ | K0 | +7.20 | | Has 4 exoplanets. |
| Omicron¹ Eridani (Beid) | | 122 ± 1 | Eridanus | 04^{h} 11^{m} 51.93956^{s} −06° 50′ 15.2864″ | F0 III | 4.04 | | |
| Mu Andromedae$ | | 122±3 | Andromeda | 00^{h} 56^{m} 45.209^{s} +38° 29′ 57.60″ | A5V | 3.87# | 26.7046±0.6467 | |
| HD 63454 (Ceibo) | | 122.83 ± 0.05 | | 07^{h} 39^{m} 21.85290^{s} −78° 16′ 44.3078″ | K3 V(k) | 9.36±0.02 | | |
| WD 2317+1830 | | 123 ± 1 | | 23^{h} 17^{m} 26.74^{s} +18° 30′ 52.76″ | DZ | | | |
| Dubhe (Alpha Ursae Majoris) | A | 123 ± 2 | Ursa Major | 11^{h} 03^{m} 43.67152^{s} +61° 45′ 03.7249″ | K0III | +1.79 | | |
| Dubhe (Alpha Ursae Majoris) | B | 123 ± 2 | Ursa Major | 11^{h} 03^{m} 43.67152^{s} +61° 45′ 03.7249″ | A5V | | | |
| Mu¹ Boötis (Alkalurops) | | 123 ± 4 | Boötes | 15^{h} 24^{m} 29.43147^{s} +37° 22′ 37.7613″ | F2IV | | | |
| HAT-P-11 (GSC 03561-02092/Kepler-3) | | 123.42 ± 0.05 | | 19^{h} 50^{m} 50.2473^{s} +48° 04′ 51.101″ | K4V | 9.59 | | Has two confirmed exoplanet (HAT-P-11b & c). |
| HD 117618 (Dofida) | | 124 ± 3 | | 13^{h} 32^{m} 25.55543^{s} –47° 16′ 16.9091″ | G0 V | 7.17 | | |
| HD 38283 (Bubup) | | 124.08 ± 0.08 | | 05^{h} 37^{m} 02.0168^{s} −73° 41′ 57.645″ | F9.5 V | 6.70 | | |
| Mu Leonis (Rasalas) | | 124.1 ± 0.8 | Leo | 09^{h} 52^{m} 45.81654^{s} +26° 00′ 25.0319″ | K2 IIIb CN1 Ca1 | 3.88 | | |
| K2-18 (EPIC 201912552) | | 124.3 ± 0.1 | | 11^{h} 30^{m} 14.51774^{s} +07° 35′ 18.2553″ | M2.8 | 13.50 | | Has two confirmed exoplanet (K2-18b & c). |
| GJ 2126 (CD-35 11361) | | 124.3±0.4 | | | MO | | | Has one known exoplanet. |
| Alpha Coronae Australis (Meridiana) | | 125 ± 1 | Corona Australis | 19^{h} 09^{m} 28.34097^{s} −37° 54′ 16.1022″ | A2V | 4.102 | | |
| Iota Crucis | | 125 ± 1 | Crux | 12^{h} 45^{m} 38.05167^{s} −60° 58′ 52.7563″ | K0 III | 4.69 | | |
| HD 89744 | B | 125 ± 2 | | 10^{h} 22^{m} 14.8721^{s} +41° 14′ 26.514″ | L | | | Has one known and one unconfirmed exoplanet. |
| HD 89744 | A | 125.8 ± 0.2 | | 10^{h} 22^{m} 14.8721^{s} +41° 14′ 26.514″ | F7V or F8IV | 5.73 | | Has one known and one unconfirmed exoplanet. |
| G Scorpii (Fuyue) | | 125.8 ± 0.7 | Scorpius | 17^{h} 49^{m} 51.48081^{s} −37° 02′ 35.8975″ | K2III | +3.21 | | |
| TOI-6478 | | 125.93±0.33 | | | M5 | | | Has one known exoplanet |
| HD 31527 | | 126 | | | G0V | | | Has 3 exoplanets. |
| HD 108147 (Tupã) | | 126.62 ± 0.08 | | 12^{h} 25^{m} 46.2674^{s} −64° 01′ 19.516″ | F8/G0V | 6.994 | | |
| HD 10180 (2MASS J01375356-6030414) | | 127.10 ± 0.07 | | 01^{h} 37^{m} 53.57724^{s} −60° 30′ 41.4821″ | G1V | +7.33 | | Has 6 confirmed and 3 unconfirmed exoplanets. |
| HD 23472 | | 127.48 | | | K3.5V | | | Has 5 exoplanets. |
| HD 28185 | | 128.0 ± 0.1 | | 04^{h} 26^{m} 26.323^{s} −10° 33′ 02.95″ | G6.5IV-V | +7.80 | | Has two known exoplanets. |
| HD 102117 (Uklun) | | 128.65 ± 0.09 | | 11^{h} 44^{m} 50.46086^{s} −58° 42′ 13.3580″ | G6V | 7.47 | | |
| WD 0343+247 | | 129 ± 1 | | 03^{h} 46^{m} 46.517^{s} +24° 56′ 02.67″ | DX13 | +19.0 | | |
| Epsilon Hydrae (Ashlesha) | A | 129 ± 5 | Hydra | 08^{h} 46^{m} 46.51223^{s} +06° 25′ 07.6855″ | G5 III | 3.38 + 7.5 | | |
| Epsilon Hydrae (Ashlesha) | B | 129 ± 5 | Hydra | 08^{h} 46^{m} 46.51223^{s} +06° 25′ 07.6855″ | F0 V | | | |
| Epsilon Hydrae (Ashlesha) | C | 129 ± 5 | Hydra | 08^{h} 46^{m} 46.51223^{s} +06° 25′ 07.6855″ | F5 | | | |
| HD 166348 | | 130 | Corona Australis* | | K6V | | | |
| Gamma Centauri (Muhlifain) | A | 130 ± 1 | Centaurus | 12^{h} 41^{m} 31.04008^{s} −48° 57′ 35.5375″ | A1IV | +2.17 | | |
| Gamma Centauri (Muhlifain) | B | 130 ± 1 | Centaurus | 12^{h} 41^{m} 31.04008^{s} −48° 57′ 35.5375″ | A0IV | | | |
| Gamma Leonis (Algieba) | A | 130 ± 3 | Leo | 10^{h} 19^{m} 58.35056^{s} +19° 50′ 29.3468″ | K0III | +2.08 | | |
| Gamma Leonis (Algieba) | B | 130 ± 3 | Leo | 10^{h} 19^{m} 58.35056^{s} +19° 50′ 29.3468″ | G7III | | | |
| HD 164604 (Pincoya) | | 130.5 ± 0.2 | | 18^{h} 03^{m} 06.93302^{s} –28° 33′ 38.3488″ | K3.5V(k) | 9.62 | | |
| Kepler-42 (KOI-961) | | 130.8 ± 0.1 | | 19^{h} 28^{m} 52.5689^{s} 44° 37′ 08.990″ | M5V | +16.12 | | Has 3 exoplanets. |
| Beta Ursae Minoris (Kochab) | | 130.9 ± 0.6 | Ursa Major | 14^{h} 50^{m} 42.32580^{s} +74° 09′ 19.8142″ | K4 III | +2.08 | | |
| Omega¹ Aquarii | A | 131 ± 3 | Aquarius | 23^{h} 39^{m} 47.069^{s} −14° 13′ 19.75″ | A3V | 4.96 | | |
| Omega¹ Aquarii | B | 131 ± 3 | Aquarius | 23^{h} 39^{m} 47.069^{s} −14° 13′ 19.75″ | K2V | | | |
| Tau Centauri | | 131 ± 3 | Centaurus | 12^{h} 37^{m} 42.16377^{s} −48° 32′ 28.6899″ | A0 V or A1 IVnn | +3.86 | | |
| HD 137388 (Karaka) | | 132.2 ± 0.2 | | 15^{h} 35^{m} 39.921^{s} −80° 12′ 16.54″ | K2IV or K0/K1V | 8.70 | | |
| 83 Cancri | A | 132.8 ± 0.5 | Cancer | 09^{h} 18^{m} 58.82772^{s} +17° 42′ 19.2744″ | F4V | 6.61 | | |
| 83 Cancri | B | 132.8 ± 0.5 | Cancer | 09^{h} 18^{m} 58.82772^{s} +17° 42′ 19.2744″ | W | | | |
| Alpha Pegasi (Markab) | | 133 ± 1 | Pegasus | 23^{h} 04^{m} 45.65345^{s} +15° 12′ 18.9617″ | B9V, B9.5III, B9III, A0 IV | +2.48 | | |
| Theta² Serpentis | | 133.0 ± 0.6 | Serpens | 18^{h} 56^{m} 14.64102^{s} +04° 12′ 07.6594″ | A5Vn | +4.98 | | |
| HD 83443 (Kalausi) | | 133.24 ± 0.09 | | 9^{h} 37^{m} 11.8275^{s} –43° 16′ 19.934″ | K0 V | 8.23 | | |
| HR 8799 (V342 Pegasi) | | 133.3 ± 0.2 | | 23^{h} 07^{m} 28.7157^{s} +21° 08′ 03.311″ | kA5 hF0 mA5 V; λ Boo | +5.964 | | Has 4 exoplanets and 1 unconfirmed. |
| Omicron Leonis (Subra) | A | 133.53±0.45 | Leo | 09^{h} 41^{m} 09.032^{s} +09° 53′ 32.31″ | F8-G0III | +3.52 | | |
| Omicron Leonis (Subra) | B | 133.53±0.45 | Leo | 09^{h} 41^{m} 09.032^{s} +09° 53′ 32.31″ | A7m | | | |
| Beta² Sagittarii (Arkab Posterior) | | 134 ± 1 | Sagittarius | 19^{h} 23^{m} 13.13745^{s} −44° 47′ 59.2051″ | F2/3 V or F2 III | +4.29 | | |
| Beta Tauri (Elnath) | | 134 ± 2 | Taurus | 05^{h} 26^{m} 17.51312^{s} +28° 36′ 26.8262″ | B7III | +1.65 | | |
| Theta¹ Serpentis (Alya) | | 134.4 ± 1.0 | Serpens | 18^{h} 56^{m} 13.18720^{s} +04° 12′ 12.9821″ | A5V | +4.62 | | |
| HD 285507 | | 135 | Taurus | 04^{h} 07^{m} 01.0^{s} +15° 20′ 06″ | K5 | | | Has one confirmed exoplanet (HD 285507 b). Member of Hyades Open cluster. |
| ZTF J1901+1458 | | 135.0 ± 0.3 | | 19^{h} 01^{m} 32.73986^{s} +14° 58′ 07.1761″ | DX | +20.0 | | Most massive white dwarf star. |
| HD 168746 (Alasia) | | 136.0 ± 0.1 | | 18^{h} 21^{m} 49.783^{s} −11° 55′ 21.65″ | G5V | 7.95 | | Has one confirmed exoplanet (HD 168746b/Onasilos). |
| Delta Cancri (Asellus Australis) | | 137 ± 1 | Cancer | 08^{h} 44^{m} 41.099^{s} +18° 09′ 15.51″ | K0 III | +3.94 | | |
| Eta Eridani (Azha) | | 137 ± 1 | Eridanus | 02^{h} 56^{m} 25.64948^{s} −08° 53′ 53.3221″ | K1+ IIIb | +3.87 | | |
| HD 6434 (Nenque) | | 137.8 ± 0.1 | | 01^{h} 04^{m} 40.15027^{s} –39° 29′ 17.5842″ | G2/G3V | 7.71±0.12 | | |
| Rho Tucanae | | 137.8 ± 0.4 | Tucana | 00^{h} 42^{m} 28.37188^{s} −65° 28′ 04.9066″ | F6V | 5.38 | 23.6721±0.0631 | |
| HD 108570 | | 138 | | | K0/K1III | | | |
| Lambda Ursae Majoris (Tania Borealis) | | 138 ± 5 | Ursa Major | 10^{h} 17^{m} 05.78287^{s} +42° 54′ 51.6808″ | A2 IV | 3.45 | | |
| AR Lacertae | A | 138.6 ± 0.1 | Lacerta | 22^{h} 08^{m} 40.818^{s} +45° 44′ 32.11″ | K0IVe | 6.080 | | |
| AR Lacertae | B | 138.6 ± 0.1 | Lacerta | 22^{h} 08^{m} 40.818^{s} +45° 44′ 32.11″ | G2IV | | | |
| AR Lacertae | C | 138.6 ± 0.1 | Lacerta | 22^{h} 08^{m} 40.818^{s} +45° 44′ 32.11″ | DA(?) | | | |
| 56 Persei | A | 138.7 ± 0.5 | Perseus | 04^{h} 24^{m} 37.46102^{s} +33° 57′ 35.2908″ | F4V | 5.77 | | |
| 56 Persei | B | 138.7 ± 0.5 | Perseus | 04^{h} 24^{m} 37.46102^{s} +33° 57′ 35.2908″ | DA3.1 | | | |
| 56 Persei | C | 138.7 ± 0.5 | Perseus | 04^{h} 24^{m} 37.46102^{s} +33° 57′ 35.2908″ | F4 + ? | | | |
| Beta Herculis (Kornephoros) | | 139 ± 3 | Hercules | 16^{h} 30^{m} 13.19955^{s} +21° 29′ 22.6008″ | G7IIIa | +2.81 | | |
| Achernar (Alpha Eridani) | A | 139 ± 3 | Eridanus | 01^{h} 37^{m} 42.84548^{s} −57° 14′ 12.3101″ | B3 Vpe | 0.40–0.46 | | Most oblate star known in the Milky Way. |
| Achernar (Alpha Eridani) | B | 139 ± 3 | Eridanus | 01^{h} 37^{m} 42.84548^{s} −57° 14′ 12.3101″ | A1V-A3V | | | Most oblate star known in the Milky Way. |
| HD 49674 (Nervia) | | 139.9 ± 0.1 | | 06^{h} 51^{m} 30.51621^{s} +40° 52′ 03.9241″ | G3V | 8.10 | | Has 1 exoplanet. |
| 2MASS J01375879−5645447 | | 140 | | | M | | | |
| Beta¹ Tucanae | | 140 ± 1 | Tucana | 00^{h} 31^{m} 32.6709^{s} −62° 57′ 29.587″ | B9V + ? | +4.37 | | |
| Sigma Andromedae | | 140±1 | Andromeda | 00^{h} 18^{m} 19.65737^{s} +36° 47′ 06.8085″ | A2V | 4.51 | 23.2542±0.1809 | |
| BD+05 4868 B | | 140.8 ± 0.4 | | 21^{h} 47^{m} 26.71^{s} +06° 36′ 18.4″ | M | 10.16 | | |
| HD 93385 | | 140.9 ± 0.1 | | 10^{h} 46^{m} 15.116^{s} –41° 27′ 51.73″ | G2/G3 V | +7.486 | | Has 3 exoplanets. |
| Kappa Geminorum | | 141 ± 1 | Gemini | 07^{h} 44^{m} 26.85357^{s} +24° 23′ 52.7872″ | G9 III | 3.568 + 8.2 | | |
| BD+05 4868 A | | 142.2 ± 0.1 | | 21^{h} 47^{m} 26.52^{s} +06° 36′ 17.5″ | K | 10.16 | | Has one confirmed exoplanet (BD+05 4868Ab). |
| Eta Apodis | | 142.3 ± 0.7 | Apus | 14^{h} 18^{m} 13.89590^{s} −81° 00′ 27.9306″ | A2MA7-F2 | +4.89 | | |
| HD 27894 | | 142.50 ± 0.08 | | 04^{h} 20^{m} 47.046^{s} −59° 24′ 39.02″ | K2 V | +9.36 | | Has 3 exoplanets. |
| TOI-4364 | | 143 | Taurus | | M4V | | | Has one confirmed exoplanet (TOI-4364 b). Member of Hyades Open cluster. |
| Epsilon Sagittarii (Kaus Australis) | | 143 ± 2 | Sagittarius | 18^{h} 24^{m} 10.31840^{s} −34° 23′ 04.6193″ | B9.5 III | +1.85 | | |
| K2-3 (EPIC 201367065) | | 143.4 ± 0.1 | | 11^{h} 29^{m} 20.39171^{s} −01° 27′ 17.2817″ | M0V | 12.168±0.009 | | Has 3 exoplanets. |
| DS Tucanae (HD 222259) | B | 143.98 ± 0.08 | Tucana | 23^{h} 39^{m} 39.48081^{s} −69° 11′ 44.7077″ | K3V | 9.84 | | Has one confirmed exoplanet (DS Tucanae Ab). |
| DS Tucanae (HD 222259) | A | 144.08 ± 0.10 | Tucana | 23^{h} 39^{m} 39.48081^{s} −69° 11′ 44.7077″ | G6V | 8.47 | | Has one confirmed exoplanet (DS Tucanae Ab). |
| 90 Tauri | | 144 ± 2 | Taurus | 04^{h} 38^{m} 09.46166^{s} +12° 30′ 38.9918″ | A6 V | 4.27 | | Member of Hyades Open cluster. |
| 26 Aquilae | | 144 ± 3 | Aquila | 19^{h} 20^{m} 32.90620^{s} −05° 24′ 56.7649″ | G8III-IV | 5.00 | | |
| HD 57625 | | 144.3 | | | F8 | | | Has one known exoplanet. |
| Alpha Octantis | A | 144.8 ± 0.6 | Octans | 21^{h} 04^{m} 43.06347^{s} −77° 01′ 25.5735″ | F4III | +5.13 | | |
| Alpha Octantis | B | 144.8 ± 0.6 | Octans | 21^{h} 04^{m} 43.06347^{s} −77° 01′ 25.5735″ | F5III | | | |
| LSPM J0207+3331 | | 145 ± 1 | | 02^{h} 07^{m} 33.8061^{s} +33° 31′ 29.542″ | DA | | | |
| Theta Sagittae | B | 145.47 ± 0.09 | Sagitta | 20^{h} 09^{m} 56.2404^{s} +20° 55′ 04.230″ | G5V | +8.769 | | |
| Theta Sagittae | A | 145.7 ± 0.1 | Sagitta | 20^{h} 09^{m} 56.2404^{s} +20° 55′ 04.230″ | F3V | +6.516 | | |
| Alpha Monocerotis | | 145.7 ± 0.9 | Monoceros | 07^{h} 41^{m} 14.832^{s} −09° 33′ 04.08″ | G9.5 III-IIIb Fe-0.5 | 3.94 | | |
| K2-25 | | 145.9 ± 0.2 | Taurus | 04^{h} 13^{m} 05.6131^{s} +15° 14′ 52.018″ | M4.5 V | 15.881 | | Has one confirmed exoplanet (K2-25b). Member of Hyades Open cluster. |
| Epsilon Tauri (Ain) | | 146 ± 1 | Taurus | 04^{h} 28^{m} 37.0003^{s} +19° 10′ 49.563″ | K0III | +3.53 | | Has one confirmed exoplanet (Epsilon Tauri b/Amateru). Member of Hyades Open cluster. |
| Beta Corvi (Kraz) | | 146 ± 1 | Corvus | 12^{h} 34^{m} 23.23484^{s} −23° 23′ 48.3374″ | G5 II | 2.647 | | |
| 71 Tauri | | 146 ± 3 | Taurus | 04^{h} 26^{m} 20.77302^{s} +15° 37′ 05.7885″ | F0 V | +4.48 | | Member of Hyades Open cluster. |
| HD 8574 (Bélénos) | | 146.2 ± 0.1 | | 01^{h} 25^{m} 12.51573^{s} +28° 34′ 00.1030″ | F8 | +7.12 | | |
| HD 208487 (Itonda) | | 146.5 ± 0.2 | | 21^{h} 57^{m} 19.84754^{s} −37° 45′ 49.0480″ | G1/3V | 7.47 | | |
| 91 Aquarii (Psi¹ Aquarii) | | 147.6 ± 0.9 | Aquarius | 23^{h} 15^{m} 53.49405^{s} −09° 05′ 15.8450″ | K1 III | 4.248 | | |
| Kappa² Tauri | | 148 ± 2 | Taurus | 04^{h} 25^{m} 25.01518^{s} +22° 11′ 59.9876″ | A7V | 5.24 | | Member of Hyades Open cluster. |
| Beta Octantis | | 149 ± 3 | Octans | 22^{h} 46^{m} 03.51098^{s} −81° 22′ 53.8120″ | A9IV-V | 4.13 | | |
| Delta³ Tauri | | 149 ± 3 | Taurus | 04^{h} 25^{m} 29.38340^{s} +17° 55′ 40.4579″ | A2IV-Vs | +4.32 | | Member of Hyades Open cluster. |
| System | Star or (sub-) brown dwarf | Distance (ly) | Constellation | Coordinates: RA, Dec (Ep J2000, Eq J2000) | Stellar class | Apparent magnitude (V) | Parallax (mas) | Notes and additional references |

== See also ==
- List of star systems within 95–100 light-years
- List of star systems within 150–200 light-years
