= HD 4203 b =

Super-Jupiter orbiting HD 4230

Discovery
- Discovered by: Vogt et al.
- Discovery site: Keck telescope
- Discovery date: 15 October 2001
- Detection method: radial velocity

Orbital characteristics
- Apastron: 3.14 AU (470,000,000 km)
- Periastron: 0.996 AU (149,000,000 km)
- Semi-major axis: 2.07 ± 0.13 AU (310,000,000 ± 19,000,000 km)
- Eccentricity: 0.519 ± 0.027
- Orbital period (sidereal): 431.88 ± 0.85 d 1.1824 y
- Time of periastron: 2,451,918.9 ± 2.7
- Argument of periastron: 329.1 ± 3.1
- Semi-amplitude: 60.3 ± 2.2
- Star: HD 4203

Physical characteristics
- Mass: >1.16 M_{J} (>369 M_{🜨})

HD 4203 b is an exoplanet more massive than Jupiter. It orbits two times further from the star than Earth to the Sun. The planet takes 1.1824 year to orbit the star very eccentrically from 1.00 AU to 3.14 AU. The planet was discovered by Steve Vogt using the Keck telescope.

== See also ==
- HD 4208 b
- HD 4308 b
