= Viriato =

Viriato may refer to:

- Viriathus (died 139 BC), a leader of the Lusitanian people that resisted Roman expansion in Iberia
- Viriatos, named after Viriathus, Portuguese volunteers who fought with the Nationalists in the Spanish Civil War 1936–1939
- HD 45652 b, named Viriato, an exoplanet
