= Cocibolca =

Cocibolca may refer to:

- Cocibolca, the Nahuatl name of Lake Nicaragua
- Cocibolca, the proper name of star HD 4208
