= HD 107148 =

Star in the constellation Virgo

Observation data Epoch J2000.0 Equinox ICRS
- Constellation: Virgo
- Right ascension: 12^{h} 19^{m} 13.491^{s}
- Declination: −03° 19′ 11.24″
- Apparent magnitude (V): 8.01

Characteristics
- Evolutionary stage: main sequence + white dwarf
- Spectral type: G5V + DA
- B−V color index: 0.707±0.013

Astrometry
Radial velocity (R_{v})	25.244±0.0005 km/s
Proper motion (μ)	RA: −54.565 mas/yr Dec.: −47.376 mas/yr
Parallax (π)	20.248±0.0283 mas
Distance	161.1 ± 0.2 ly (49.39 ± 0.07 pc)
Absolute magnitude (M_{V})	4.47

Position (relative to HD 107148 A)
Component	HD 107148 B
Epoch of observation	2009
Angular distance	34.9″
Position angle	174.7°
Projected separation	1,790 AU

Details

HD 107148 A
Mass	1.1±0.1 M_{☉}
Radius	1.15±0.03 R_{☉}
Luminosity	1.34±0.05 L_{☉}
Surface gravity (log g)	4.35±0.03 cgs
Temperature	5,789±36 K
Metallicity [Fe/H]	0.33±0.09 dex
Rotational velocity (v sin i)	1.22±0.20 km/s
Age	4±1 Gyr

HD 107148 B
Mass	0.6 M_{☉}
Temperature	6250±250 K

Other designations
- BD−02 3497, HD 107148, HIP 60081, SAO 138714, 2MASS J12191349-0319112, Gaia DR2 3693358861640279296

Database references
SIMBAD	data

HD 107148 is a wide binary star system in the constellation of Virgo. A pair of exoplanets have been confirmed in orbit around the brighter star. This system is located at a distance of 161 light years from the Sun based on parallax measurements, and is drifting further away with a radial velocity of 25.2 K. Although having an absolute magnitude of 4.47, at that range the system is too faint to be visible with the naked eye, having an apparent visual magnitude of 8.01.

The brighter primary member, designated component A, has a spectrum that presents as a G-type main-sequence star, a yellow dwarf, with a stellar classification of G5V. The star is about 4 billion years old and is spinning with a projected rotational velocity of 1.2 km/s. Based on the abundance of iron, a measure of the star's metallicity, it is twice as enriched with heavy elements than the Sun. The star exhibits a magnetic activity cycle with a period around 6 years. It has 1.1 times the mass of the Sun and 1.15 times the Sun's radius. HD 107148 is radiating 1.34 times the luminosity of the Sun from its photosphere at an effective temperature of 5,789 K.

In 2012, a comoving white dwarf stellar companion HD 107148 B was detected at projected separation of 1,790 AU, and was confirmed in 2014. It is a 0.6 M_{☉} remnant core of the former 1.8±0.2 M_{☉} star with a cooling age of 2.1±0.3 Gyr. This was formerly the primary component of this system before it ejected much of its mass.

== Planetary system ==
In 2006, a discovery of Saturn-mass planet was announced. Another Neptune-sized planet was discovered in 2021, together with significantly refined orbit of HD 107148 b.

HD 107148 should not be confused with HD 108147 located in the constellation Crux, which also has an extrasolar planet discovered in 2000.

The HD 107148 planetary system
Companion (in order from star)	Mass	Semimajor axis (AU)	Orbital period (days)	Eccentricity	Inclination (°)	Radius
b	>0.196±0.009 M_{J}	0.3692^{+0.0037}_{−0.0038}	77.185^{+0.01}_{−0.025}	0.15^{+0.02}_{−0.06}	—	—
c	> 0.068^{+0.004}_{−0.005} M_{J}	0.1415±0.0015	18.3270^{+0.0008}_{−0.0016}	0.40^{+0.04}_{−0.08}	—	—

== See also ==
- List of extrasolar planets
