= HD 8574 b =

Exoplanet orbiting HD 8574

HD 8574 b / Bélisama
Discovery
- Discovered by: Perrier et al.
- Discovery site: Haute-Provence Observatory in France
- Discovery date: 4 April 2001
- Detection method: doppler spectroscopy

Orbital characteristics
- Apastron: 1.04 AU (156 million km)
- Periastron: 0.48 AU (72 million km)
- Semi-major axis: 0.76 ± 0.04 AU (113.7 ± 6.0 million km)
- Eccentricity: 0.37 ± 0.082
- Orbital period (sidereal): 225 ± 1.1 d 0.616 y
- Time of periastron: 2,451,475.6 ± 5.5
- Argument of periastron: 2 ± 16
- Semi-amplitude: 64.1 ± 5.5
- Star: HD 8574

Physical characteristics
- Mass: >1.96 ± 0.18 M_{J} (>622 M_{🜨})
- Temperature: 356 K (83 °C; 181 °F)

HD 8574 b is an extrasolar planet discovered in 2001 by a team of European astronomers using Doppler spectroscopy as part of the ELODIE Planet Search Survey, and was published in a paper with five other planets. HD 8574 b is in the orbit of host star HD 8574. The planet is at most two times the mass of Jupiter, orbiting every 227 days at three quarters of the distance between the Earth and Sun. HD 8574 b has a very elliptical orbit, far more than that of Jupiter.

The planet HD 8574 b is named Bélisama. The name was selected in the NameExoWorlds campaign by France, during the 100th anniversary of the IAU. Bélisama was the goddess of fire, notably of the hearth and of metallurgy and glasswork, in Gaulish mythology.

== Discovery ==
The ELODIE Planet Search Survey, undertaken using the ELODIE spectrograph at the Haute-Provence Observatory in southeastern France, was a large-scale search for extrasolar planets orbiting G-type and F-type dwarf stars visible from the Northern Hemisphere through use of the radial velocity method (the orbit of a planet tugs on its host star as it orbits, causing a perceived Doppler effect in the star's spectrum). This survey, which started in 1994, led to the discovery of 51 Pegasi b, the first extrasolar planet discovered in the orbit of a sunlike star. By 2003, the discovery of six new planets, including HD 8574 b, was announced, bringing ELODIE's planet discovery count to eighteen.

HD 8574, one of the target stars of ELODIE, had been previously catalogued by the European Space Agency with the release of the Hipparcos catalogue in 1997. Most of HD 8574's characteristics were extracted from this catalogue for use in searching for a planet around HD 8574. The spectrum was then analyzed to see if HD 8574 were active, a factor that could mask or mimic the signal of an orbiting planet. It was found that the star was not significantly active.

In the case of HD 8574, ELODIE obtained 41 radial velocity measurements, which had, at the time of the discovery paper, been collected since 11 January 1998. Analysis of the collected data confirmed the existence of a planet orbiting HD 8574. Of the six, the planet HD 8574 b had the shortest orbital period, orbiting its host star under three years (unlike the five other planets that had been discovered by ELODIE at the same time).

HD 8574 b was announced by the European Southern Observatory on 4 April 2001. The findings addressing HD 8574's discovery were published in 2003.

== Host star ==
HD 8574 is an F-type dwarf star that lies 45 parsecs (150 light-years) away from Earth. HD 8574 has an estimated mass of 1.17 times the mass of the Sun. The star also has a radius that is estimated at 1.37 times that of the Sun's. HD 8574 has an effective temperature of 6,080 K, hotter than the Sun, and a metallicity estimated at [Fe/H] = 0.05 (12% more iron than in the Sun). Additionally, with a luminosity of 2.25, HD 8574 releases more than twice the energy released by the Sun.

The star has an apparent magnitude of 7.12, and is thus extremely faint (if visible at all) as seen from the unaided eye of an observer on Earth.

== Characteristics ==
HD 8574 is a large planet that orbits its host star every 227.55 days at a distance of 0.77 AU, or 77% the mean distance between the Earth and the Sun. HD 8574 b has, of the six planets announced in a November 2003 discovery paper, the shortest orbit. The planet has an estimated mass of 2.11 times Jupiter's mass. HD 8574 b has a measured orbital eccentricity of 0.288, denoting an elliptical orbit. Jupiter, in comparison, orbits the Sun with an orbital eccentricity of 0.016, which is far more circular.
