= Tumé Arandú =

Mythological figure in the Guaraní culture

Tumé Arandú is a mythological figure in the Guaraní culture. He is considered to be the "father of wisdom".

The exoplanet HD 108147 b is officially named after Tumé Arandú.

== Family ==
Tumé Arandú is a son of Rupave and Sypave, "Father of the people" and "Mother of the people". He was the first of their sons, the wisest of men and the great prophet of the Guaraní people. His brother was Marangatú, father of Kerana, the mother of the seven legendary monsters.
