= HD 108147 b =

Exoplanet in the constellation Crux

HD 108147 b / Tumearandu
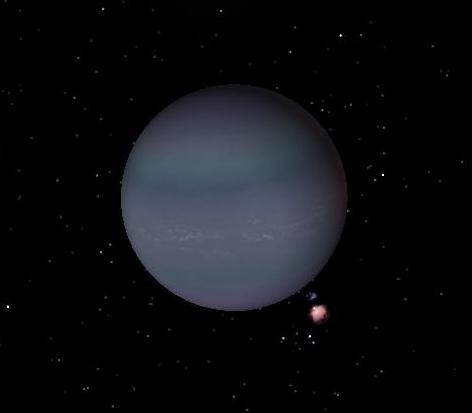
- The exoplanet HD 108147 b (min mass ~0.4 MJ) rendered by Celestia

Discovery
- Discovered by: Pepe, Mayor, Galland et al.
- Discovery site: La Silla Observatory, Chile
- Discovery date: April 15, 2000
- Detection method: Doppler spectroscopy (CORALIE)

Orbital characteristics
- Semi-major axis: 0.104 AU (15,600,000 km)
- Eccentricity: 0.498 ± 0.025
- Orbital period (sidereal): 10.901 ± 0.001 d
- Time of periastron: 2,451,591.6 ± 0.1
- Argument of periastron: 318 ± 3.03
- Semi-amplitude: 25.1 ± 6.1
- Star: HD 108147

HD 108147 b, also named Tumearandu, is a gas giant exoplanet with a minimum mass about half that of Jupiter. It orbits the star in a very tight "torch orbit". The distance between the planet and the star is only a tenth of the distance between Earth and the Sun (0.1AU). A number of such worlds are known to exist, but the eccentricity of this planet is unusually high. Planets orbiting very close to their parent stars usually have round orbits because of the tidal forces between the bodies.

In December 2019, the International Astronomical Union announced the exoplanet will bear the name Tumearandu, after the popular character Tumé Arandú of the folklore of Paraguay. The name was a result of a contest ran in Paraguay by the Centro Paraguayo de Informaciones Astronómicas, along with the IAU100 NameExoWorlds 2019 global contest.

== See also ==
- HD 107148 b
