= HD 50554 b =

Extrasolar planet in the constellation Gemini

Discovery
- Discovered by: Geneva Extrasolar Planet Search
- Discovery date: April 4, 2001
- Detection method: Doppler spectroscopy

Orbital characteristics
- Semi-major axis: 2.339+0.03 −0.029 AU
- Eccentricity: 0.482+0.015 −0.015
- Orbital period (sidereal): 1238+7 −8 d 3.39+0.02 −0.023 yr
- Inclination: 61°±12° or 119°±12°
- Longitude of ascending node: 97°+50° −40°
- Time of periastron: 2455567+21 −23
- Argument of periastron: 4.0°+2.6° −2.1°
- Semi-amplitude: 91.5 ± 7.6
- Star: HD 50554

Physical characteristics
- Mass: 5.85+0.9 −0.52 M_{J}

HD 50554 b is a Jupiter-sized exoplanet with a minimum mass 4.4 times that of Jupiter. The planet was announced in 2001 by the European Southern Observatory and formally published in 2002 using observations from the Lick and Keck telescopes. In 2023, the inclination and true mass of HD 50554 b were determined via astrometry.

== See also ==
- HD 50499 b
