= EK Draconis =

Star in the constellation Draco

Observation data Epoch J2000 Equinox ICRS
- Constellation: Draco
- Right ascension: 14^{h} 39^{m} 00.210^{s}
- Declination: +64° 17′ 29.98″
- Apparent magnitude (V): 7.53 – 7.64

Characteristics
- Evolutionary stage: Main sequence
- Spectral type: G5V Fe-0.7 CH-1 (k)
- Variable type: BY Dra

Astrometry
Radial velocity (R_{v})	−21.12±0.19 km/s
Proper motion (μ)	RA: −135.751 mas/yr Dec.: −37.089 mas/yr
Parallax (π)	29.0661±0.0217 mas
Distance	112.21 ± 0.08 ly (34.40 ± 0.03 pc)

Details
Mass	1.0 M_{☉}
Radius	0.99 R_{☉}
Luminosity	0.83 L_{☉}
Surface gravity (log g)	4.46±0.22 cgs
Temperature	5,682±75 K
Metallicity [Fe/H]	$\begin{smallmatrix}\left[\ce{M}/\ce{H}\right]\end{smallmatrix}$ = −0.20±0.03 dex
Rotation	2.69 days
Rotational velocity (v sin i)	16.0 km/s
Age	70±18 Myr

Other designations
- EK Dra, BD+64 1017, GJ 559.1, HD 129333, HIP 71631, SAO 16453, TIC 159613900, TYC 4176-540-1, 2MASS J14390026+6417299, SDSS J143900.24+641730.1

Database references
SIMBAD	data

EK Draconis (EK Dra) is a young active G-type main-sequence star located in the constellation of Draco. It is located approximately 112 light-years away from the solar system. With an apparent visual magnitude between 7.53 and 7.64, it is too faint to be visible to the naked eye and requires binoculars or a small telescope for observation.

== Characteristics ==
EK Draconis is a Solar analog, similar in spectral type and mass to the Sun but significantly younger at 50–125 million years old. The star is notable for its high levels of magnetic activity, including powerful superflares and coronal mass ejections (CMEs). EK Draconis is classified as a BY Draconis variable, exhibiting brightness variations due to large starspots and rapid rotation.

EK Draconis is a G-type main-sequence star with a spectral classification of G5V. Its effective temperature is approximately 5,561 K, close to that of our Sun. EK Draconis has a mass of 1.0 M_{☉} and a radius of 0.9 to 0.99 R_{☉}. The star's luminosity is roughly 0.97 times that of the Sun. Its metallicity, measured by iron abundance, is slightly higher than solar at [Fe/H] = 0.07. The star's surface gravity is approximately 4.47.

The star lies at a galactic latitude of about 49° and a galactic longitude of 106°, placing it within the Milky Way disk. Its proper motion is −12.59 milliarcseconds per year in declination and −139.54 milliarcseconds per year in right ascension, with a radial velocity of −20.3 km/s, indicating it is approaching the Solar System.

=== Companion ===
EK Draconis is a single-lined spectroscopic binary system, orbited by a low-mass companion. The companion is likely an M-dwarf star, with the system's orbital parameters determined through radial velocity measurements and speckle interferometry. The eccentricity of the orbit is approximately 0.13, and the semi-major axis is large, suggesting a wide separation. Detailed orbital elements have been refined using data from multiple surveys, confirming EK Draconis as one of the nearest young binary systems evolving similarly to the Sun.

== Observations ==
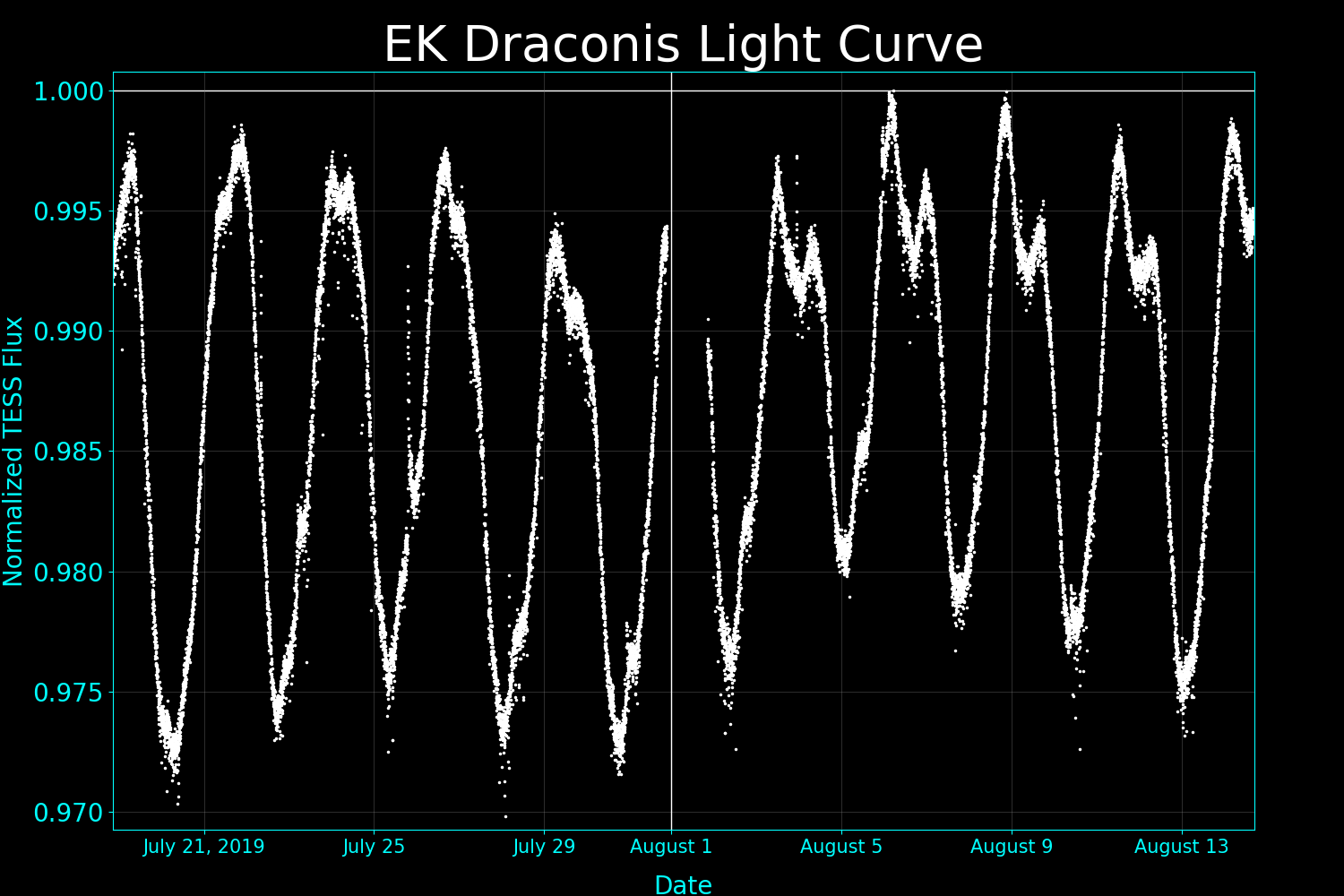
EK Draconis light curve plotted from TESS data

EK Draconis rotates rapidly for a G-type star, with an equatorial rotation period of about 2.5–2.8 days and a projected rotational velocity of 16.4 km/s. The star exhibits significant differential rotation, with shear rates varying between 0.19 and 0.38 rad/d across observational epochs, leading to laptimes (the time for the equator to lap the poles) of 16–48 days. Its inclination angle is approximately 60°.

The star's magnetic field is strong and dynamic, with average strengths ranging from 58 to 92 G over multi-year observations. It features a predominantly toroidal and axisymmetric field, with poloidal components that are often non-axisymmetric. No polarity reversals have been detected, but the field evolves over months, transitioning between toroidal-dominant and balanced poloidal-toroidal configurations. Surface features include large starspots at intermediate latitudes (40°–70°) and occasional polar spots, contributing to its variability as a BY Draconis variable star. Chromospheric activity is high, with indicators like the Ca II H&K S-index averaging 0.644 and log R'HK of -4.08. The Rossby number is approximately 0.2, indicating strong convective dynamo action influenced by rotation.

EK Draconis has been extensively studied as a proxy for the young Sun due to its age and solar-like properties. In April 2020, astronomers observed a superflare using NASA's Transiting Exoplanet Survey Satellite (TESS) and the Kyoto University's SEIMEI Telescope, followed by a massive coronal mass ejection (CME). The superflare was tens to hundreds of times more energetic than typical solar flares, and the subsequent CME expelled plasma with a mass in the quadrillions of kilograms—over 10 times larger than the most massive known solar CMEs. The ejecta traveled at speeds up to 500 km/s (about 1 million mph). This event, the first optical spectroscopic detection of a supermassive filament eruption on a Sun-like star, suggests that such phenomena were more common in the Sun's youth and could have influenced the atmospheres of early Solar System planets, such as stripping gas from proto-Mars.

Multi-wavelength campaigns, including observations in 2021–2023, have further documented prominence eruptions associated with superflares, enhancing understanding of stellar space weather. Magnetic field mapping using instruments like ESPaDOnS and NARVAL from 2006 to 2012 has revealed the star's complex dynamo processes.

== See also ==
- Lists of stars
- List of star systems within 100–150 light-years
