= HD 130322 b =

Hot Jupiter

HD 130322 b / Eiger
Discovery
- Discovered by: Udry, Mayor, Pepe et al.
- Discovery site: La Silla Observatory
- Discovery date: 4 May 2000
- Detection method: Doppler spectroscopy (CORALIE)

Orbital characteristics
- Semi-major axis: 0.088 AU (13,200,000 km)
- Eccentricity: 0.029±0.016
- Orbital period (sidereal): 10.70871±0.00018 d
- Time of periastron: 2453996.4±1.1
- Argument of periastron: 193±36
- Semi-amplitude: 112.5±2.4
- Star: HD 130322

HD 130322 b, officially named Eiger, is an exoplanet with a minimum mass slightly more than that of Jupiter. It orbits the star in a very close orbit distance being only a quarter that of Mercury from the Sun. It is thus a so-called "hot Jupiter". The planet orbits the star every 10 days 17 hours in a very circular orbit.

== Naming ==
The planet HD 130322 b is named Eiger. The name was selected in the NameExoWorlds campaign by Switzerland, during the 100th anniversary of the IAU. Eiger is one of the prominent peaks of the Bernese Alps.

== See also ==
- List of exoplanets discovered before 2000
