= HD 4203 =

Star in the constellation Pisces

Observation data Epoch J2000.0 Equinox ICRS
- Constellation: Pisces
- Right ascension: 00^{h} 44^{m} 41.2003^{s}
- Declination: +20° 26′ 56.138″
- Apparent magnitude (V): 8.70

Characteristics
- Evolutionary stage: subgiant
- Spectral type: G5V
- B−V color index: +0.771±0.021

Astrometry
Radial velocity (R_{v})	−14.20±0.09 km/s
Proper motion (μ)	RA: +122.100 mas/yr Dec.: −124.204 mas/yr
Parallax (π)	12.3036±0.0195 mas
Distance	265.1 ± 0.4 ly (81.3 ± 0.1 pc)
Absolute magnitude (M_{V})	4.28

Details
Mass	1.12±0.03 M_{☉}
Radius	1.35±0.03 R_{☉}
Luminosity	1.68±0.01 L_{☉}
Surface gravity (log g)	4.22±0.03 cgs
Temperature	5,666±43 K
Metallicity [Fe/H]	0.34±0.01 dex
Rotational velocity (v sin i)	5.6 km/s
Age	6.3±1.0 Gyr

Other designations
- BD+19°117, HD 4203, HIP 3502, SAO 74235

Database references
SIMBAD	data
Exoplanet Archive	data

HD 4203 is a single star in the equatorial constellation of Pisces, near the northern constellation border with Andromeda. It has a yellow hue and is too faint to be viewed with the naked eye, having an apparent visual magnitude of 8.70. The distance to this object is 265 light years based on parallax, but it is drifting closer to the Sun with a radial velocity of −14 km/s.

This object is an ordinary G-type subgiant star with a stellar classification of G5V. It is photometrically-stable star with an inactive chromosphere, and has a much higher than normal metallicity. The star is roughly 6.3 billion years old and is spinning with a projected rotational velocity of 5.6 km/s. It has 12% more mass than the Sun and a 35% greater radius. HD 4203 is radiating 1.68 times the luminosity of the Sun from its photosphere at an effective temperature of 5,666 K.

== Planetary system ==
Radial velocity observations of this star during 2000–2001 found a variability that suggesting an orbited sub-stellar companion, designated component 'b'. Additional observations led to a refined orbital period of 432 days with a relatively high eccentricity of 0.52 for a gas giant companion. The presence of a second companion was deduced from residuals in the data, then confirmed in 2014. However, the orbital elements for this companion, component 'c', are poorly constrained.

The HD 4203 planetary system
Companion (in order from star)	Mass	Semimajor axis (AU)	Orbital period (days)	Eccentricity	Inclination (°)	Radius
b	> 1.164±0.067 M_{J}	2.07±0.18	431.88±0.85	0.519±0.027	—	—
c	> 2.17±0.52 M_{J}	—	6,700±4,500	0.24±0.13	—	—

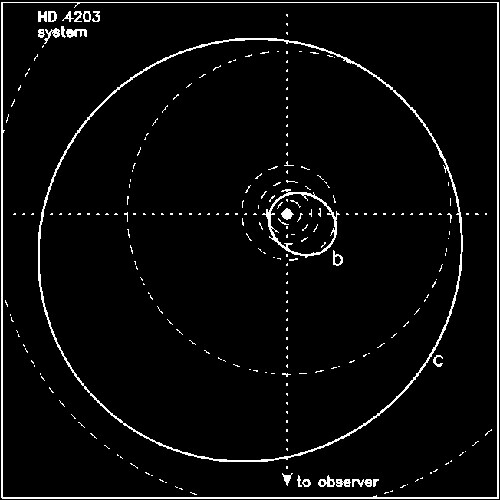
A top-down view of the HD 4203 system showing the orbits of both planets. The orbits of the Solar System planets (from Mercury to Saturn) are shown as dashed lines for comparison.

== See also ==
- HD 4208
- HD 4308
- List of extrasolar planets
