= HD 107148 b =

Gas giant

Discovery
- Discovered by: Butler et al.
- Discovery site: Keck Observatory, United States
- Discovery date: 15 July 2006
- Detection method: radial velocity

Orbital characteristics
- Semi-major axis: 0.367 ± 0.005 AU (54,900,000 ± 750,000 km)
- Eccentricity: 0.174^{+0.071}_{−0.075}
- Orbital period (sidereal): 77 d
- Time of periastron: 2,399,987 ± 12
- Argument of periastron: 75
- Semi-amplitude: 11 ± 1.8
- Star: HD 107148

Physical characteristics
- Mass: >0.203 ± 0.0015M_{J}

HD 107148 b is a jovian exoplanet with minimum mass of only 70% that of Saturn. Unlike Saturn, it orbits much closer to the star. The planetary orbit was significantly refined in the 2021.

== See also ==
- HD 108147 b
