= Alpha Monocerotis =

Star in the constellation Monoceros

α Monocerotis
- Location of α Monocerotis (circled)

Observation data Epoch J2000 Equinox J2000
- Constellation: Monoceros
- Right ascension: 07^{h} 41^{m} 14.832^{s}
- Declination: −09° 33′ 04.08″
- Apparent magnitude (V): 3.94

Characteristics
- Evolutionary stage: red clump
- Spectral type: G9.5 III-IIIb Fe-0.5
- B−V color index: 1.022

Astrometry
Radial velocity (R_{v})	11.66±0.06 km/s
Proper motion (μ)	RA: −74.989 mas/yr Dec.: −19.838 mas/yr
Parallax (π)	22.3839±0.1348 mas
Distance	145.7 ± 0.9 ly (44.7 ± 0.3 pc)
Absolute magnitude (M_{V})	0.71±0.08

Details
Mass	2.25±0.13 M_{☉}
Radius	10.42±0.12 R_{☉}
Luminosity	63.7±1.3 L_{☉}
Surface gravity (log g)	2.79±0.04 cgs
Temperature	5049±32 K
Metallicity [Fe/H]	−0.04±0.03 dex
Rotation	326 days
Rotational velocity (v sin i)	0.92±0.45 km/s
Age	890±180 Myr

Other designations
- α Mon, 26 Monocerotis, BD−09°2172, HD 61935, HIP 37447, HR 2970, SAO 134986

Database references
SIMBAD	data

Alpha Monocerotis, Latinised from α Monocerotis, is the Bayer designation for a star in the equatorial constellation of Monoceros. It can be viewed with the naked eye, having an apparent visual magnitude of 3.94. Despite being labeled "alpha", it is not the brightest star in the constellation; Beta Monocerotis is, though the individual stars of the latter are fainter. Based upon an annual parallax shift of 22.4 mas as seen from Earth, it is located 146 light-years away from the Sun. The star is moving away from the Sun with a radial velocity of +11.7 km/s.

The stellar classification of G9.5 III-IIIb Fe-0.5 indicates this is an evolved giant star of type G, which means the hydrogen has been depleted at its core and the outer envelope has expanded and cooled. The 'Fe−0.5' notation indicates the spectrum displays a slight underabundance of iron relative to other stars of this temperature. It is a red clump giant, which means it is generating energy through helium fusion at its core. At the age of 890 million years, this yellow-hued star has an estimated 2.2 times the mass of the Sun and 10 times the Sun's radius. It is spinning sedately with a rotation period of about 326 days.
