= AR Lacertae =

Star system in the constellation Lacerta

- Location of AR Lacertae (circled in red)

Observation data Epoch J2000.0 Equinox ICRS
- Constellation: Lacerta
- AR Lacertae
- Right ascension: 22^{h} 08^{m} 40.81821^{s}
- Declination: +45° 44′ 32.1079″
- Apparent magnitude (V): 6.080; Min_{1} 6.770; Min_{2} 6.430
- WDJ220838.73+454434.04
- Right ascension: 22^{h} 08^{m} 38.73351^{s}
- Declination: +45° 44′ 34.0416″

Characteristics
- Evolutionary stage: Subgiants
- Spectral type: K0IVe + G2IV + DA(?)
- B−V color index: 0.567±0.008
- Variable type: Algol/RS CVn

Astrometry
Radial velocity (R_{v})	−33.84±0.26 km/s
Proper motion (μ)	RA: −52.310±0.021 mas/yr Dec.: +46.931±0.020 mas/yr
Parallax (π)	23.5246±0.0228 mas
Distance	138.6 ± 0.1 ly (42.51 ± 0.04 pc)
Absolute bolometric magnitude (M_{bol})	2.75±0.066

WDJ220838.73+454434.04
Proper motion (μ)	RA: −52.851±0.062 mas/yr Dec.: +55.138±0.047 mas/yr
Parallax (π)	23.5967±0.0529 mas
Distance	138.2 ± 0.3 ly (42.38 ± 0.10 pc)

Orbit
Period (P)	1.98395±0.00002 d
Semi-major axis (a)	8.869±0.015 R_{☉}
Eccentricity (e)	0.00 (adopted)
Inclination (i)	90° (adopted)°
Longitude of the node (Ω)	6.9207±0.0128°
Periastron epoch (T)	2451745.5794 ± 0.0002 HJD

Details

Cooler (K0) component
Mass	1.21±0.077 M_{☉}
Radius	2.61±0.009 R_{☉}
Luminosity (bolometric)	3.55 L_{☉}
Surface gravity (log g)	3.69±0.035 cgs
Temperature	5,100 K
Rotational velocity (v sin i)	73 km/s

Hotter (G5) component
Mass	1.17±0.035 M_{☉}
Radius	1.51±0.005 R_{☉}
Luminosity (bolometric)	2.09 L_{☉}
Temperature	5,826 K
Rotational velocity (v sin i)	46 km/s

WDJ220838.73+454434.04
Mass	0.6+0.04 −0.09 M_{☉}
Radius	0.0125+0.0014 −0.0012 R_{☉}
Age	5.75+4.97 −2.38 Gyr

Other designations
- AR Lac, BD+45°3813, GC 30985, HD 210334, HIP 109303, HR 8448, SAO 51684, WDS J22087+4545AB

Database references
SIMBAD	Main system
- WDJ220838.73+454434.04

AR Lacertae is a frequently-studied triple star system in the northern constellation of Lacerta, abbreviated AR Lac. This variable star system is the prototype for "detached systems of the AR Lacertae type". It is dimly visible to the naked eye with a combined peak apparent visual magnitude of 6.08. Based on parallax measurements, AR Lac is located at a distance of 138.6 light years from the Sun. It is drifting closer with a heliocentric radial velocity of −34 km/s.

== Observation history ==
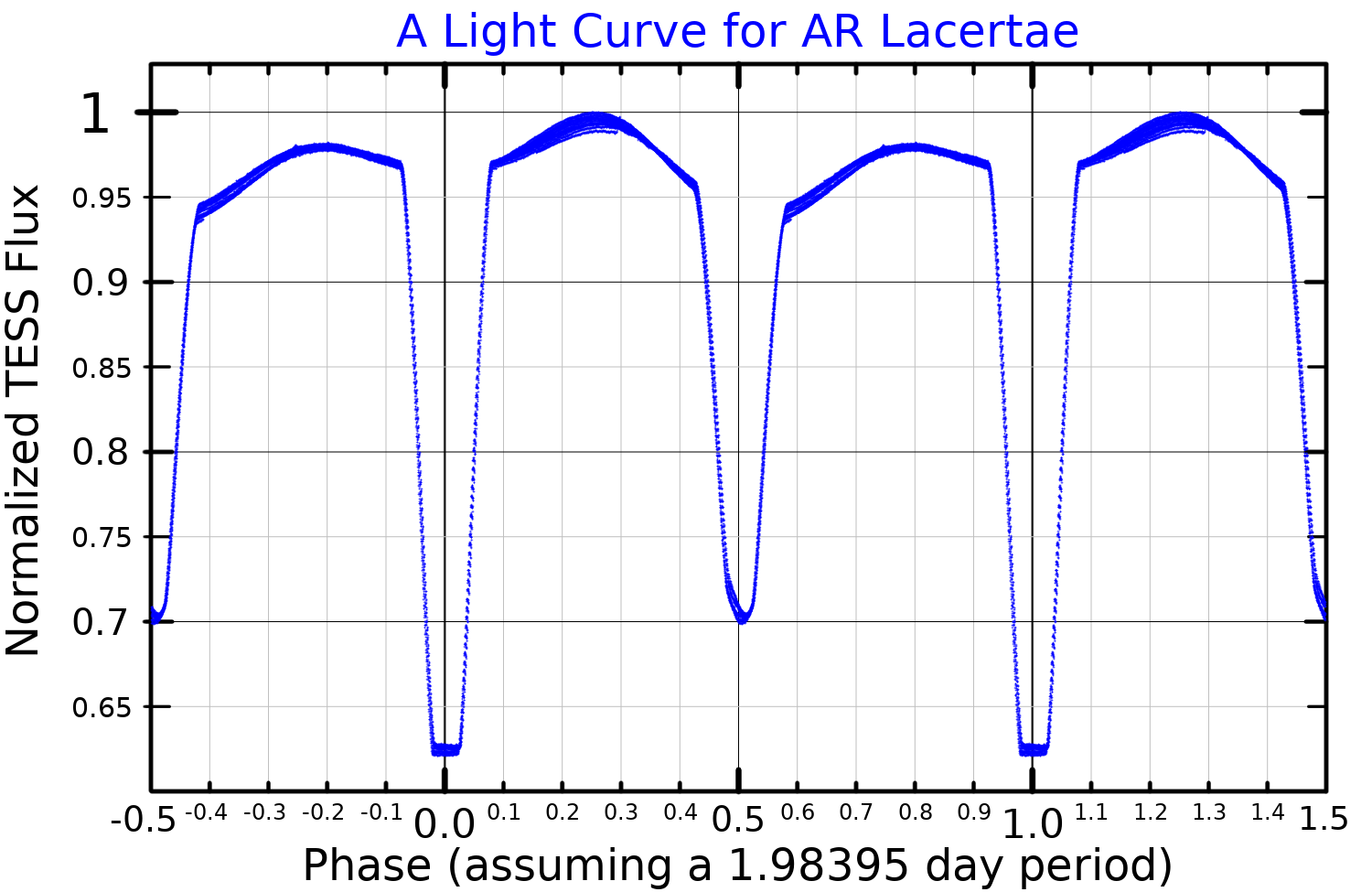
A light curve for AR Lacertae, plotted from TESS data,

The variability of this binary system was discovered by H. R. Leavitt at Harvard College Observatory, and announced in August 1907 by E. C. Pickering. Due to an orbital period of nearly two days, the eclipsing binary nature of this system was not recognized until 1929 by L. G. Jacchia. W. E. Harper derived orbital elements in 1933. It has an orbital period of 1.98 days and a brightness variation of 0.06 in visual magnitude.

In 1934, A. B. Wyse published spectral classes of K0 and G5 for the components. The K0 star displayed sharp emission lines of singly ionized calcium. The primary minimum is caused by the larger K0 component eclipsing the hotter G5 star, while the secondary eclipse is an annular eclipse of the K0 component by the smaller companion. The stars displayed periodic light variations indicating ellipticity and reflection. The K0 star also showed evidence of significant limb darkening.

In 1946, F. B. Wood reported the intrinsic variability of the hotter component. This variation only disappeared when the smaller star was being eclipsed. The following year, G. E. Kron hypothesized that this variation was due to the presence of huge light and dark patches on the star. To explain the light variations, these had to cover about 20% of the total visible surface, and they must form, move, and later dissolve. The variation was modulated by the rotation period of the star.

By 1972, AR Lac had been identified as an RS Canum Venaticorum variable (RS CVn), consisting of two subgiant stars in a detached binary system. It was found to be a source for radio emission in 1973. This emission varied over time and the system displayed flare activity. The system was detected as an X-ray source by EXOSAT in 1987. The X-ray source with a temperature of 5–7 million K dropped to a minimum during the primary eclipse, indicating it originated on the hotter star. In contrast, X-ray emission from 15–30 million K plasma was not eclipsed, indicating a source larger than the two stars.

== Properties ==
This is a close, double-lined spectroscopic binary star system, which means the spectra of both components are visible and overlap. They have an essentially circular orbit with a period of 1.98395 days and a separation of 8.9 times the radius of the Sun. The orbital plane is inclined at an angle of 90° to the plane of the sky, which is why two eclipses are visible every orbit. As with other RS CVn systems, their rotation periods are tidally locked to their orbital period. The cooler component is the larger and more massive star, which is consistent with its evolutionary state. There is some evidence of extended matter around this star.

Both components display star spots with an activity cycle of about 17 years. Variation in the orbital period of this system has been reported since 1998, which shows a cyclical oscillation over a period of 50.93 years, and a long-term decrease of a day every 470 million years. This orbital variation may be the result of magnetic activity of the two stars. Stellar flares radiate at a temperature of 12,000±300 K and expand to 2% of the stellar surface.

In 2022, a co-moving companion to this system was announced, making this a triple star system. It was discovered by the Backyard Worlds: Planet 9 citizen science project. Designated WDJ220838.73+454434.04, this companion is a white dwarf at an angular separation of 21.9″ from the binary pair. At the distance of AR Lac, this is equivalent to a projected separation of about 930 AU. It has a mass of 0.6+0.04
−0.09 M_{☉} and a radius of 0.0125+0.0014
−0.0012 R_{☉}. The companion has an estimated age of 5.75 Gyr and has been steadily cooling for about the last 1.62 Gyr. As a main sequence star, it had a mass of 1.34+0.46
−0.27 M_{☉}. At the estimated separation, a circular orbit of this companion around the inner binary would have an orbital period of approximately 16,000 years.
