= HD 108147 =

Star in the constellation of Crux

HD 108147 / Tupã
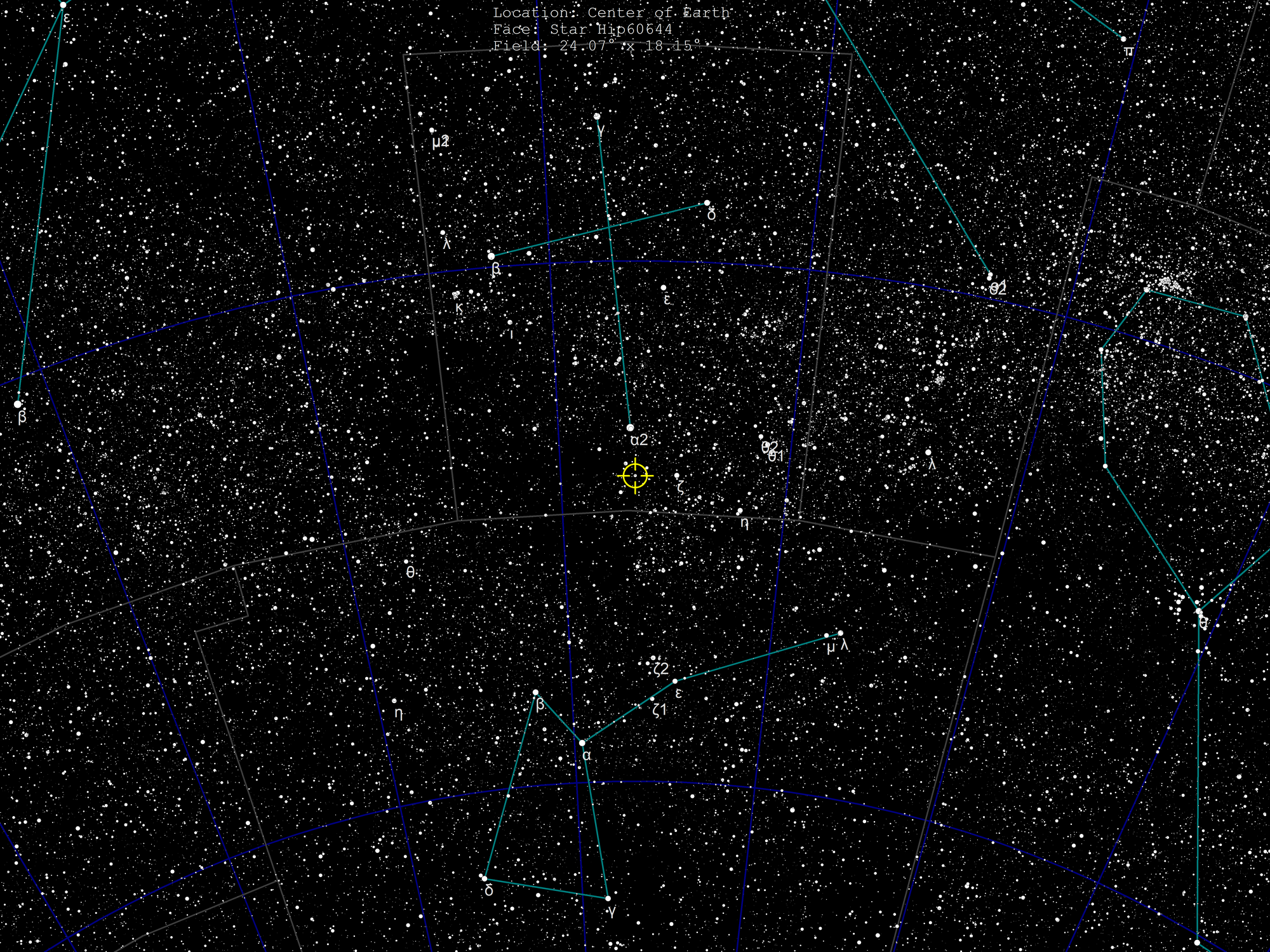
- Star map shows star position on the southern edge of the constellation Crux

Observation data Epoch J2000 Equinox ICRS
- Constellation: Crux
- Right ascension: 12^{h} 25^{m} 46.2674^{s}
- Declination: −64° 01′ 19.516″
- Apparent magnitude (V): 6.994

Characteristics
- Evolutionary stage: main sequence
- Spectral type: F8/G0V
- B−V color index: 0.537

Astrometry
Radial velocity (R_{v})	−5.03±0.13 km/s
Proper motion (μ)	RA: −182.666 mas/yr Dec.: −60.693 mas/yr
Parallax (π)	25.7587±0.0159 mas
Distance	126.62 ± 0.08 ly (38.82 ± 0.02 pc)
Absolute magnitude (M_{V})	+4.09

Details
Mass	1.27±0.02 M_{☉}
Radius	1.21 R_{☉}
Luminosity	1.93 L_{☉}
Surface gravity (log g)	4.59±0.15 cgs
Temperature	6265±40 K
Metallicity [Fe/H]	0.2±0.06 dex
Rotation	8.7 days
Rotational velocity (v sin i)	5.13 km/s
Age	2.17 Gyr

Other designations
- Tupã, CD−63°757, CPD−63°2270, GC 16944, HIP 60644, LTT 4696, SAO 251899

Database references
SIMBAD	data
Exoplanet Archive	data

HD 108147, also known as Tupã, is a 7th magnitude star in the constellation of Crux in direct line with and very near to the bright star Acrux or Alpha Crucis. It is either a yellow-white or yellow dwarf (the line is arbitrary and the colour difference is only from classification, not real), slightly brighter and more massive than the Sun. The spectral type is F8 V or G0 V. The star is also younger than the Sun. Due to its distance of 127 light-years, it is too dim to be visible with the unaided eye; with binoculars it is an easy target. However, due to its southerly location it is not visible in the northern hemisphere except for the tropics.

An extrasolar planet was detected orbiting it in 2000 by the Geneva Extrasolar Planet Search Team. This exoplanet is "a gas giant smaller than Jupiter that orbits very tightly around its primary [star] in 11 days at only 0.1 AU." This is much closer than the orbit of Mercury in the Solar System.

In December 2019, the International Astronomical Union announced the star will bear the name Tupã, after the God of the Guarani peoples of Paraguay. The name was a result of a contest ran in Paraguay by the Centro Paraguayo de Informaciones Astronómicas, along with the IAU100 NameExoWorlds 2019 global contest.

It should not be confused with HD 107148, which also has an extrasolar planet discovered in 2006 in the constellation Virgo.

The HD 108147 planetary system
Companion (in order from star)	Mass	Semimajor axis (AU)	Orbital period (days)	Eccentricity	Inclination (°)	Radius
b / Tumearandu	>0.40 M_{J}	0.104	10.901±0.001	0.498±0.025	—	—

== See also ==
- List of extrasolar planets
