= K2-25 =

Red dwarf star located in the Hyades cluster

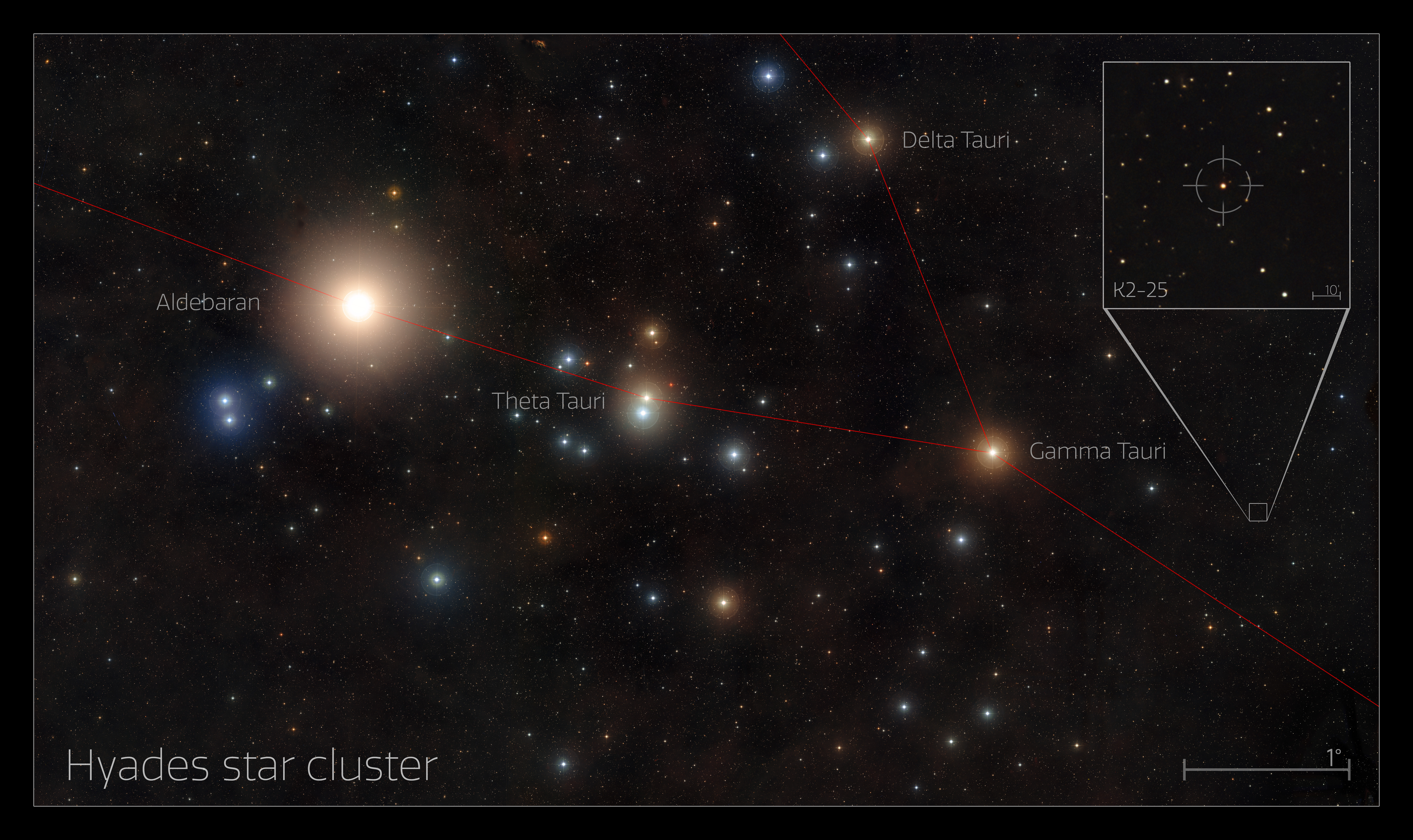
- Location of K2-25 in the Hyades cluster

Observation data Epoch J2000 Equinox ICRS
- Constellation: Taurus
- Right ascension: 04^{h} 13^{m} 05.6131^{s}
- Declination: +15° 14′ 52.018″
- Apparent magnitude (V): 15.881

Characteristics
- Evolutionary stage: main sequence
- Spectral type: M4.5 V
- Apparent magnitude (J): 11.303(21)
- Apparent magnitude (H): 10.732(20)
- Apparent magnitude (K): 10.444(19)
- Variable type: Planetary transit

Astrometry
| Radial velocity (R_{v}) | 38.64(15) km/s |
| Proper motion (μ) | RA: 122.450(38) mas/yr Dec.: −18.603(26) mas/yr |
| Parallax (π) | 22.3572±0.0308 mas |
| Distance | 145.9 ± 0.2 ly (44.73 ± 0.06 pc) |

Details
| Mass | 0.2634(77) M_{☉} |
| Radius | 0.2932(93) R_{☉} |
| Luminosity | 0.00816(29) L_{☉} |
| Temperature | 3207(58) K |
| Metallicity [Fe/H] | 0.15(3) dex |
| Rotation | 1.87708(66) d |
| Rotational velocity (v sin i) | 7.71(29) km/s |
| Age | 650(70) Myr |

Other designations
- vA 50, HAN 87, EPIC 210490365, 2MASS J04130560+1514520, Gaia DR3 3311804515502788352

Database references
| SIMBAD | data |
| Exoplanet Archive | data |

K2-25 is a young red dwarf star located in the Hyades cluster. There is a single known Neptune-sized planet in a 3.5 day orbit.

== Hyades cluster ==
Using proper motion measurements in a search for low-luminosity members of the Hyades cluster, William van Altena first identified the star vA 50 (later known as K2-25) as a probable cluster member. Membership in the Hyades cluster was later confirmed.

== Properties ==
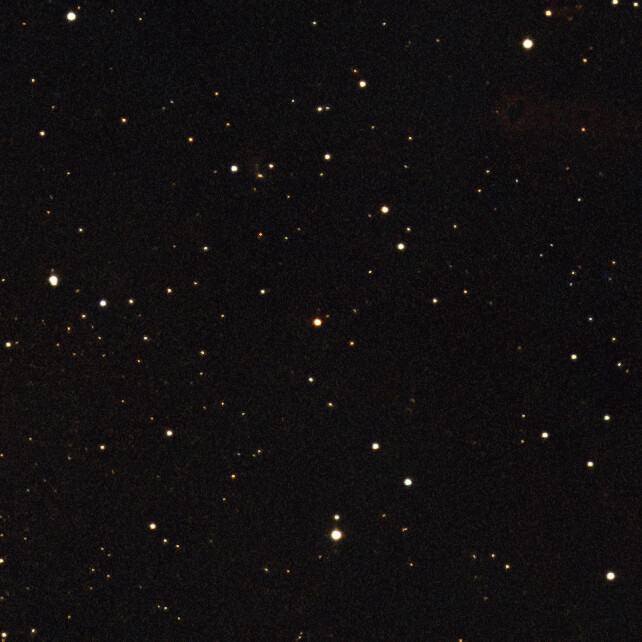
K2-25 is the star at the center of this image.

K2-25 is a red dwarf that is only 26% the mass of the Sun and less than 1% of the luminosity. As a member of the Hyades cluster, it is only 650 million years old as compared to the Sun's 4.5 billion.

There is clear evidence for starspot activity in both the Kepler data and radial velocities as well as the associated activity indicators.

== Planetary system ==
The star has one known planet, K2-25b, with searches of the Kepler space telescope data for transits of additional planets being negative. Analysis of transit-timing variations from the Spitzer Space Telescope as well as the MEarth Project also found no evidence of additional planets.

=== Discovery ===
Brightness measurements of K2-25 taken by the Kepler space telescope during its extended K2 mission led to the discovery of the transiting planet K2-25b.

=== Characteristics ===
K2-25b is a Hot Neptune type planet in an eccentric 3.48 day orbit.

Due to its proximity and the activity levels of its host star, K2-25b should be losing some of its atmosphere to space; however, observations of two transits by the Hubble Space Telescope to search for escaping neutral hydrogen were negative.

The K2-25 planetary system
| Companion (in order from star) | Mass | Semimajor axis (AU) | Orbital period (days) | Eccentricity | Inclination (°) | Radius |
|---|---|---|---|---|---|---|
| b | 24.5+5.7 −5.2 M_{🜨} | 0.0287(12) | 3.48456408+0.0000006 −0.0000005 | 0.428+0.050 −0.049 | 88.16+0.18 −0.21 | 3.44(12) R_{🜨} |
