= HD 50554 =

Star in the constellation Gemini

Observation data Epoch J2000.0 Equinox ICRS
- Constellation: Gemini
- Right ascension: 06^{h} 54^{m} 42.82615^{s}
- Declination: +24° 14′ 44.0057″
- Apparent magnitude (V): +6.84

Characteristics
- Evolutionary stage: main sequence
- Spectral type: F8V
- B−V color index: 0.582±0.008

Astrometry
Radial velocity (R_{v})	−3.77±0.13 km/s
Proper motion (μ)	RA: −35.839 mas/yr Dec.: −96.668 mas/yr
Parallax (π)	32.1855±0.0242 mas
Distance	101.34 ± 0.08 ly (31.07 ± 0.02 pc)
Absolute magnitude (M_{V})	4.46

Details
Mass	1.06±0.03 M_{☉}
Radius	1.07±0.03 R_{☉}
Luminosity	1.37±0.01 L_{☉}
Surface gravity (log g)	4.4±0.04 cgs
Temperature	6,036±52 K
Metallicity [Fe/H]	0.05±0.06 dex
Rotational velocity (v sin i)	2.3 km/s
Age	3.3±1.4 Gyr; 2.1±1.6 Gyr

Other designations
- BD+24°1451, GC 9043, HD 50554, HIP 33212, SAO 78855, GSC 01894-01961

Database references
SIMBAD	data
Exoplanet Archive	data

HD 50554 is a single, Sun-like star with an exoplanetary companion in the northern constellation of Gemini. It has an apparent visual magnitude of +6.84, which makes it a 7th magnitude star; it is not visible to the naked eye, but can be viewed with binoculars or a telescope. The system is located at a distance of 101 light-years (31 parsecs) from the Sun based on parallax, but is drifting closer with a radial velocity of −4 km/s.

This is a yellow-white hued F-type main-sequence star with a stellar classification of F8V. Age estimates put it at around 2–3 billion years old. It has a Sun-like metallicity a low level of chromospheric activity and is spinning with a projected rotational velocity of 2.3 km/s. The star has a slightly higher mass and larger radius than the Sun. It is radiating 137% of the luminosity of the Sun from its photosphere at an effective temperature of 6,036 K.

== Planetary system ==
In 2001, a giant planet was announced by the European Southern Observatory, who used the radial velocity method. The discovery was formally published in 2002 using observations from the Lick and Keck telescopes. In 2023, the inclination and true mass of HD 50554 b were determined via astrometry. Two more inner planet candidates, both super-Earths, have been detected by TESS; they were validated by a 2026 study.

An infrared excess indicates a debris disk is orbiting the star at a distance of 45 AU with a half-width of 4 AU. This may be an analog of the Kuiper belt at an earlier stage of its evolution, which suggests a Neptune-like planet could be orbiting at its inner edge.

The HD 50554 planetary system
Companion (in order from star)	Mass	Semimajor axis (AU)	Orbital period (days)	Eccentricity	Inclination (°)	Radius
c	<5.3 M_{🜨}	0.066+0.009 −0.018	5.969362(20)	—	—	1.31±0.06 R_{🜨}
d	<10.4 M_{🜨}	0.168+0.028 −0.065	28.06940(40)	—	—	1.41+0.14 −0.09 R_{🜨}
b	4.88+0.31 −0.26 M_{J}	2.274±0.029	1,223.1+2.0 −1.9	0.456+0.019 −0.018	111.0±6.5	—
Disk	45 AU				—	—

== See also ==
- HD 50499
- List of extrasolar planets
