= Beta Octantis =

Astrometric binary star in the constellation Octans

β Octantis
- Location of β Octantis (circled)

Observation data Epoch J2000 Equinox ICRS
- Constellation: Octans
- Right ascension: 22^{h} 46^{m} 03.51098^{s}
- Declination: −81° 22′ 53.8120″
- Apparent magnitude (V): 4.13

Characteristics
- Spectral type: A9IV-V
- U−B color index: +0.11
- B−V color index: +0.20

Astrometry
Radial velocity (R_{v})	+19.0±0.6 km/s
Proper motion (μ)	RA: −54.49 mas/yr Dec.: +1.16 mas/yr
Parallax (π)	21.85±0.43 mas
Distance	149 ± 3 ly (45.8 ± 0.9 pc)
Absolute magnitude (M_{V})	+0.83

Details
Mass	2.27 M_{☉}
Radius	3.2 R_{☉}
Luminosity	42 L_{☉}
Surface gravity (log g)	4.15 cgs
Temperature	8,006 K
Metallicity [Fe/H]	−0.02 dex
Rotational velocity (v sin i)	49 km/s
Age	496 Myr

Other designations
- β Oct, CPD−82°889, FK5 924, GC 31712, HD 214846, HIP 112405, HR 8630, SAO 258941

Database references
SIMBAD	data

Beta Octantis, Latinized from β Octantis, is a probable astrometric binary star system in the southern circumpolar constellation of Octans. It is faintly visible to the naked eye with an apparent visual magnitude of 4.13. Based upon an annual parallax shift of 21.85 mas as seen from Earth, it is located about 149 light years from the Sun. It is moving away from the Sun with a radial velocity of +19 km/s.

Based upon a stellar classification of A9IV-V, the visible component is an evolving, white-hued A-type star with a spectrum that shows mixed traits of a main sequence and a subgiant star. It has an estimated 2.27 times the mass of the Sun and 3.2 times the Sun's radius. The star is around 500 million years old with a projected rotational velocity of 49 km/s. It is radiating 42 times the Sun's luminosity from its photosphere at an effective temperature of 8,006 K.
