= HD 37124 b =

Exoplanet in the constellation Taurus

Discovery
- Discovered by: California and Carnegie Planet Search
- Discovery site: W. M. Keck Observatory
- Discovery date: November 1, 1999
- Detection method: Doppler spectroscopy

Orbital characteristics
- Semi-major axis: 0.53 AU (79,000,000 km)
- Eccentricity: 0.055
- Orbital period (sidereal): 154.46 ± 0.369 d
- Time of periastron: 2,450,000.11
- Argument of periastron: 140.5
- Semi-amplitude: 27.5
- Star: HD 37124

HD 37124 b is an extrasolar planet approximately 103 light-years away in the constellation of Taurus (the Bull). The planet was discovered in 1999 orbiting the star HD 37124. Based on its mass, it is most likely that this planet is a Jovian planet (like Jupiter).
