= 26 Aquilae =

Star in the constellation Aquila

- Location of 26 Aquilae (circled)

Observation data Epoch J2000 Equinox ICRS
- Constellation: Aquila
- Right ascension: 19^{h} 20^{m} 32.90620^{s}
- Declination: −05° 24′ 56.7649″
- Apparent magnitude (V): 5.00

Characteristics
- Evolutionary stage: red giant branch
- Spectral type: G8 III-IV
- U−B color index: +0.634
- B−V color index: +0.936

Astrometry
Radial velocity (R_{v})	−16.91±1.93 km/s
Proper motion (μ)	RA: +1,132.516 mas/yr Dec.: +46.738 mas/yr
Parallax (π)	22.688±0.5046 mas
Distance	144 ± 3 ly (44.1 ± 1.0 pc)

Orbit
Period (P)	266.544 days
Eccentricity (e)	0.833
Semi-amplitude (K_{1}) (primary)	29.86 km/s

Details

26 Aquilae A
Mass	3.2+0.2 −0.2 M_{☉}
Radius	6 R_{☉}
Luminosity	21 L_{☉}
Surface gravity (log g)	3.2 cgs
Temperature	4,940 K
Metallicity [Fe/H]	−0.21 dex
Rotational velocity (v sin i)	1.3 km/s

26 Aquilae B
Mass	1.4±0.05 M_{☉}

Other designations
- f Aquilae, BD−05°4936, FK5 3544, HD 181391, HIP 95066, HR 7333, SAO 143286

Database references
SIMBAD	data

26 Aquilae (abbreviated 26 Aql) is a binary star system in the equatorial constellation of Aquila. 26 Aquilae is its Flamsteed designation though it also bears the Bayer designation f Aquilae. It has an apparent visual magnitude of 5.00, which means it is faintly visible to the naked eye. As the Earth orbits the Sun, this star system undergoes a parallax shift of 22.7 mas. This means it is located at a distance of approximately 144 light-years (44 parsecs) from Earth, give or take a three-light-year margin of error.

This is a single-lined spectroscopic binary system, meaning that the presence of an orbiting companion is revealed through shifts in the spectrum of the primary star. The pair orbit each other with a period of 266.544 days at a high eccentricity of 0.833. Little is known about this companion, although its mass can be estimated as 140% of the Sun's.

The primary component has a stellar classification of G8 III-IV. The luminosity class of III-IV indicates the spectrum resembles that of a star part way between the subgiant and giant stages of its evolution. It has more than three times the mass of the Sun and six times the Sun's radius. It is radiating 21 times as much luminosity as the Sun from this enlarged outer envelope at an effective temperature of 4,940 K. At this heat, the star glows with the characteristic yellow hue of a G-type star.
