= WD 0346+247 =

White dwarf in the constellation Taurus

Observation data Epoch J2000.0 Equinox ICRS
- Constellation: Taurus
- Right ascension: 03^{h} 46^{m} 46.517^{s}
- Declination: +24° 56′ 02.67″
- Apparent magnitude (V): 19.0

Characteristics
- Evolutionary stage: white dwarf
- Spectral type: DX13
- U−B color index: +0.30
- B−V color index: +1.44

Astrometry
Proper motion (μ)	RA: +520.177 mas/yr Dec.: −1,157.434 mas/yr
Parallax (π)	25.2941±0.2085 mas
Distance	129 ± 1 ly (39.5 ± 0.3 pc)
Absolute magnitude (M_{V})	16.80

Details
Mass	0.553±0.031 M_{☉}
Radius	0.011±0.001 R_{☉}
Luminosity	0.000048 L_{☉}
Temperature	4,197±83 K
Age	11.49±1.51 Gyr

Other designations
- WD 0343+247, WD 0346+247, EQ J0346+249, J0346+2455

Database references
SIMBAD	data

WD 0346+247 is a white dwarf in the ecliptic constellation of Taurus. It was discovered in 1997 when examination of photographs taken for a survey of brown dwarfs in the Pleiades revealed a faint star with high proper motion. It is one of the coolest white dwarfs known, with an effective temperature estimated to be approximately 3,800 K, equivalent to a spectral type of M0. Although referred to as WD 0346+246 in the discovery paper, it is more correctly designated WD 0346+247.

Recent studies using NASA's Spitzer Space Telescope and MDM Observatory's 2.4-meter telescope (near Tucson, Arizona, USA) shows that this white dwarf (together with another one: SDSS J110217.48+411315.4) has a low (for white dwarfs) surface temperature between 3,700 and 3,800 K due to it being 11 to 12 billion years old.
