= HD 37124 d =

Extrasolar planet in the constellation of Taurus

Discovery
- Discovered by: Marcy et al.
- Discovery site: United States
- Discovery date: 24 June 2005
- Detection method: Radial velocity

Orbital characteristics
- Semi-major axis: 3.19 AU (477,000,000 km)
- Eccentricity: 0.2
- Orbital period (sidereal): 2,295 d
- Time of periastron: 2,449,606
- Argument of periastron: 266
- Semi-amplitude: 12.2
- Star: HD 37124

HD 37124 d is an extrasolar planet approximately 103 light-years away in the constellation of Taurus. The planet was discovered in 2005 orbiting the star HD 37124 in a long-period orbit. Based on its mass, it is considered to be a gas giant. An alternative solution to the radial velocities gives a period of 29.92 days and a minimum mass 17% that of Jupiter.
