= HD 45652 =

Star in the constellation Monoceros

HD 45652 / Lusitânia
Observation data Epoch J2000 Equinox ICRS
- Constellation: Monoceros
- Right ascension: 06^{h} 29^{m} 13.19200^{s}
- Declination: +10° 56′ 02.0059″
- Apparent magnitude (V): 8.10

Characteristics
- Evolutionary stage: main sequence
- Spectral type: G8-K0
- B−V color index: 0.846±0.020
- V−R color index: 0.5
- R−I color index: 0.4

Astrometry
Radial velocity (R_{v})	−5.040±0.0008 km/s
Proper motion (μ)	RA: 206.208 mas/yr Dec.: −62.550 mas/yr
Parallax (π)	28.6477±0.0227 mas
Distance	113.85 ± 0.09 ly (34.91 ± 0.03 pc)
Absolute magnitude (M_{V})	5.42

Details
Mass	0.83±0.05 M_{☉} 0.94±0.02 M_{☉} 0.91±0.03 M_{☉}
Radius	0.91±0.02 R_{☉}
Luminosity	0.61±0.01 L_{☉}
Surface gravity (log g)	4.49±0.03 cgs
Temperature	5,342±31 K
Metallicity [Fe/H]	0.286±0.032 dex
Rotational velocity (v sin i)	3.5 km/s
Age	5.4±2.7 Gyr

Other designations
- Lusitânia, BD+11 1197, GC 8415, HD 45652, HIP 30905, SAO 95735, NLTT 16570

Database references
SIMBAD	data
Exoplanet Archive	data

HD 45652 is a star with an exoplanetary companion in the equatorial constellation of Monoceros. It was officially named Lusitânia on 17 December 2019, after the IAU100 press conference in Paris by the IAU (International Astronomical Union). This star has an apparent visual magnitude of 8.10, making it an 8th magnitude star that is too dim to be visible to the naked eye. The system is located at a distance of 114 light-years from the Sun based on parallax measurements, but is drifting closer with a radial velocity of −5 km/s. It shows a high proper motion, traversing the celestial sphere at an angular rate of 0.188 arcsec yr^{−1}.

The measured atmospheric properties match a metal-rich late G- or early K-type dwarf star. It is a middle-aged main sequence star, about five billion years old, and is chromospherically inactive. The star is smaller and less massive than the Sun. It is radiating 61% of the Sun's luminosity from its photosphere at an effective temperature of 5,342 K. HD 45652 is spinning with a projected rotational velocity of 3.5 km/s.

== Planetary system ==
In May 2008, the discovery of an extrasolar planet, HD 45652 b, orbiting the star was announced. The planet was detected by the radial velocity method, using observations made from 2005 to 2007. It has been assigned the name Viriato by the IAU Division C Working Group on Star Names.

Evidence for a more distant companion was presented in 2026, either a giant planet or brown dwarf.

The HD 45652 planetary system
Companion (in order from star)	Mass	Semimajor axis (AU)	Orbital period (days)	Eccentricity	Inclination (°)	Radius
b / Viriato	≥0.433±0.076 M_{J}	0.237±0.011	44.073±0.0048	0.607±0.026	—	—
c (unconfirmed)	≥4.9+34.1 −2.4 M_{J}	17.6+44.1 −12.7	—	—	—	—
