= HD 44120 =

Binary star system in the constellation Pictor

Observation data Epoch J2000.0 Equinox ICRS
- Constellation: Pictor
- A
- Right ascension: 06^{h} 16^{m} 18.786^{s}
- Declination: −59° 12′ 48.61″
- Apparent magnitude (V): 6.44
- B
- Right ascension: 06^{h} 16^{m} 14.257^{s}
- Declination: −59° 12′ 27.41″
- Apparent magnitude (V): 14.03

Characteristics

A
- Evolutionary stage: subgiant
- Spectral type: F9.5V
- B−V color index: 0.593±0.015

B
- Evolutionary stage: white dwarf
- Spectral type: DB3.2

Astrometry

A
| Radial velocity (R_{v}) | −2.125±0.0003 km/s |
| Proper motion (μ) | RA: −45.187 mas/yr Dec.: −316.389 mas/yr |
| Parallax (π) | 27.7563±0.0172 mas |
| Distance | 117.51 ± 0.07 ly (36.03 ± 0.02 pc) |
| Absolute magnitude (M_{V}) | 3.57 |

B
| Radial velocity (R_{v}) | 40 km/s |
| Proper motion (μ) | RA: −48.359 mas/yr Dec.: −312.181 mas/yr |
| Parallax (π) | 27.7297±0.0203 mas |
| Distance | 117.62 ± 0.09 ly (36.06 ± 0.03 pc) |

Details

A
| Mass | 1.214±0.040 M_{☉} |
| Radius | 1.56 R_{☉} |
| Luminosity | 2.93 L_{☉} |
| Surface gravity (log g) | 4.10±0.03 cgs |
| Temperature | 6,005±70 K |
| Metallicity [Fe/H] | 0.09±0.06 dex |
| Rotational velocity (v sin i) | 3.39 km/s |
| Age | 4.105±0.755 Gyr |

C
| Mass | 0.67±0.10 M_{☉} |
| Radius | 0.0130±0.0003 R_{☉} |
| Surface gravity (log g) | 8.04±0.06 cgs |
| Temperature | 15,746±238 K |

Other designations
- GJ 9209, WDS J06163-5913
- A: CD−59°1275, HD 44120, HIP 29788, HR 2274, SAO 234418
- C: L 182-61, WD 0615-591

Database references
| SIMBAD | A |
- C

HD 44120 is a wide binary star system in the southern constellation of Pictor. Although visible to the naked eye, it is a challenge to view having an apparent visual magnitude of 6.44. The system is located at a distance of 118 light years from the Sun based on parallax, but it is drifting closer with a radial velocity of −2 km/s. It has an absolute magnitude of 3.57.

The primary member, designated component A of this system, is an F-type main-sequence star with a stellar classification of F9.5V. It is a Sun-like star and has been considered a "hot" solar analog with a shallower convection zone than the Sun. The estimated age of this star is about four billion years, and it is spinning with a projected rotational velocity of 3.4 km/s. It is chromospherically inactive. The star has 1.2 times the mass of the Sun and 1.6 times the Sun's radius. It is radiating nearly three times the luminosity of the Sun from its photosphere at an effective temperature of 6,005 K.

The faint secondary companion, component C, is a magnitude 14.03 white dwarf star with a class of DB3.2, indicating a helium-rich atmosphere. The object has an effective temperature of ~15,700 K with 67% of the Sun's mass but only 1.3% of the Sun's radius. It has taken 155±16 Myr for the white dwarf to have cooled to the current temperature. Prior to leaving the main sequence, this star is estimated to have had 1.45+0.20
−0.16 M_{☉} and thus was the system primary. It has an angular separation of 40.98″ along a position angle of 301.6° from the current primary. The projected separation of this co-moving pair is 1,533.9 AU. Their estimated orbit has a semimajor axis of 1,702.6 AU and an orbital period of 51,100 years.

A magnitude 7.61 visual companion, HD 44105, or component B, lies at an angular separation of 32.50″ along a position angle of 234° from component A, as of 2015. It was discovered as a double star by the Scottish astronomer James Dunlop and announced in 1829. The parallax for this star indicates a distance of approximately 214 ly (66 pc) from the Sun.
