= HD 37124 c =

Extrasolar planet in the constellation of Taurus

Discovery
- Discovered by: Marcy et al.
- Discovery site: United States
- Discovery date: 13 June 2002
- Detection method: Radial velocity

Orbital characteristics
- Semi-major axis: 1.64 AU (245,000,000 km)
- Eccentricity: 0.14
- Orbital period (sidereal): 843.6 d
- Time of periastron: 2,449,409.4
- Argument of periastron: 314.3
- Semi-amplitude: 15.4
- Star: HD 37124

HD 37124 c is an extrasolar planet approximately 103 light-years away in the constellation of Taurus. The planet was discovered in 2002 orbiting the star HD 37124. The planet is most likely to be a gas giant (based on its mass).
