= 56 Persei =

Triple star or quadruple star system in the constellation Perseus

Observation data Epoch J2000 Equinox ICRS
- Constellation: Perseus
- Right ascension: 04^{h} 24^{m} 37.46102^{s}
- Declination: +33° 57′ 35.2908″
- Apparent magnitude (V): 5.77 (5.80 + 15.00 + 9.16 + 11.30)

Characteristics
- Spectral type: F4V + DA3.1 + F4 + ?
- B−V color index: 0.400±0.019

Astrometry
Radial velocity (R_{v})	−31.8±2.9 km/s
Proper motion (μ)	RA: +43.818 mas/yr Dec.: −90.502 mas/yr
Parallax (π)	23.5093±0.0909 mas
Distance	138.7 ± 0.5 ly (42.5 ± 0.2 pc)
Absolute magnitude (M_{V})	2.73

Details

56 Per Aa
Mass	1.53 M_{☉}
Radius	1.97+0.05 −0.11 R_{☉}
Luminosity	7.166±0.034 L_{☉}
Surface gravity (log g)	4.32±0.14 cgs
Temperature	6,629±225 K
Metallicity [Fe/H]	−0.11±0.08 dex
Age	1.811 Gyr

56 Per Ab
Mass	0.90±0.12 M_{☉}
Surface gravity (log g)	8.46±0.2 cgs
Temperature	16,420±420 K

Other designations
- 56 Per, BD+33° 854, HD 27786, HIP 20591, HR 1379, SAO 57216

Database references
SIMBAD	data

56 Persei is at least a triple star and possibly a quadruple star system in the northern constellation of Perseus. It is visible to the naked eye as a dim point of light with a combined apparent visual magnitude of 5.77. The system is located 139 light-years (42.5 pc) distant from the Sun based on parallax, but is drifting closer with a radial velocity of −32 km/s.

The main component is a binary system with an orbital period of 47.3 years and a semimajor axis of 17.60 AU. The primary, designated component Aa, is an F-type main-sequence star with a stellar classification of F4V, a star that is currently fusing its core hydrogen. It is 1.8 billion years old with 1.5 times the mass of the Sun and twice the Sun's radius. It is radiating 7 times the luminosity of the Sun from its photosphere at an effective temperature of 6,629 K.

The companion, component Ab, is a hydrogen–rich white dwarf star with a class of DA3.1, having begun its main sequence life with more mass than the current primary and thus evolved into a compact star more rapidly. It now has 90% of the Sun's mass – much higher than the 0.6 M_{☉} for an average white dwarf – and an effective temperature of 16,420 K; contributing an ultraviolet excess to the system.

Component B shares a common linear motion through space with the primary, and thus may form a third member of the system. This star has 0.84 times the mass of the Sun and a projected separation of 178.2 AU from the primary. The Washington Double Star Catalogue has it classified as a double star, with a magnitude 11.30 companion at an angular separation of 0.60″ along a position angle of 292°, as of 2002.
