= HD 4308 =

Star in the constellation Tucana

Observation data Epoch J2000 Equinox ICRS
- Constellation: Tucana
- Right ascension: 00^{h} 44^{m} 39.26721^{s}
- Declination: −65° 38′ 58.2777″
- Apparent magnitude (V): 6.544±0.005

Characteristics
- Evolutionary stage: main sequence
- Spectral type: G6VFe-0.9
- Apparent magnitude (B): 7.193
- Apparent magnitude (V): 6.552
- Apparent magnitude (J): 5.366±0.024
- Apparent magnitude (H): 5.101±0.016
- Apparent magnitude (K): 4.945±0.020

Astrometry
Radial velocity (R_{v})	+95.251±0.0162 km/s
Proper motion (μ)	RA: +157.639 mas/yr Dec.: −741.913 mas/yr
Parallax (π)	45.3559±0.0178 mas
Distance	71.91 ± 0.03 ly (22.048 ± 0.009 pc)
Absolute magnitude (M_{V})	4.83

Details
Mass	0.95±0.05 M_{☉}
Radius	1.04±0.03 R_{☉}
Luminosity	1.03±0.01 L_{☉}
Surface gravity (log g)	4.38±0.02 cgs
Temperature	5,714±61 K
Metallicity [Fe/H]	−0.35±0.07 dex
Rotational velocity (v sin i)	1.0±1.0 km/s
Age	10.0+0.5 −1.0 Gyr

Other designations
- CD−66°38, GC 897, GJ 31.5, GJ 9028, HD 4308, HIP 3497, SAO 248244, PPM 352003, LFT 71, LHS 1139, LPM 40, LTT 416, TYC 8847-598-1, GCRV 50662, 2MASS J00443925-6538581

Database references
SIMBAD	data
Exoplanet Archive	data
ARICNS	data

HD 4308 is a single star with a planetary system in the southern constellation of Tucana. It has a yellow hue and is a challenge to view with the naked eye even under good seeing conditions, having an apparent visual magnitude of 6.54. This object is located at a distance of 72 light-years, as determined from parallax measurements. It is a population II star and is considered to be a member of the thick disk. The star is receding from the Sun with a radial velocity of +95 km/s.

== Stellar properties ==
This is a Sun-like G-type main-sequence star with a stellar classification of G6VFe-0.9, where the suffix notation indicates an underabundance of iron in the spectrum. The age of the star is poorly constrained, with estimated ranging from 1.6 billion years up to 10 billion. It has 95% of the mass of the Sun but 104% of the Sun's radius. The star is radiating nearly the same luminosity as the Sun from its photosphere at an effective temperature of 5,714 K.

== Planetary system ==
In 2005, a low-mass exoplanet was found in orbit around this star using the radial velocity method with the HARPS spectrograph. It is following a circular orbit close to its host star with a period of just 15.6 days. Unusual for a star with planets, HD 4308 has a metallicity lower than that of the Sun. Further radial velocity observations allowed two additional planets to be detected by 2025.

The HD 4308 planetary system
Companion (in order from star)	Mass	Semimajor axis (AU)	Orbital period (days)	Eccentricity	Inclination (°)	Radius
b	≥0.0442 M_{J}	0.115	15.56±0.02	0.00±0.01	—	—
c	≥0.15±0.07 M_{J}	—	850±25	0.47±0.34	—	—
d	≥0.14±0.08 M_{J}	—	1,500±60	0.37±0.30	—	—

== See also ==
- HD 4203
- HD 4208
- List of extrasolar planets
