= HD 85390 b =

Extrasolar planet in the constellation Vela

HD 85390 b / Madalitso
Discovery
- Discovered by: Mordasini et al.
- Discovery site: La Silla Observatory
- Discovery date: October 19, 2009
- Detection method: radial velocity (HARPS)

Orbital characteristics
- Semi-major axis: 1.54 AU (230,000,000 km)
- Eccentricity: 0.41 ± 0.12
- Orbital period (sidereal): 781 d 2.14 y
- Star: HD 85390

HD 85390 b (also known as HIP 48235 b) is an extrasolar planet which orbits the K-type main sequence star HD 85390, located approximately 106 light years away.

The planet HD 85390 b is named Madalitso. The name was selected in the NameExoWorlds campaign by Zambia, during the 100th anniversary of the IAU. Madalitso means blessings in the native language of Nyanja in Zambia.
