= Beta Monocerotis =

Triple star system in the constellation Monoceros

β Monocerotis
- Location of β Monocerotis (circled)

Observation data Epoch J2000.0 Equinox ICRS
- Constellation: Monoceros
- A
- Right ascension: 06^{h} 28^{m} 49.0700^{s}
- Declination: −07° 01′ 59.025″
- Apparent magnitude (V): 4.60
- B
- Right ascension: 06^{h} 28^{m} 49.4238^{s}
- Declination: −07° 02′ 03.876″
- Apparent magnitude (V): 5.00
- C
- Right ascension: 06^{h} 28^{m} 49.6128^{s}
- Declination: −07° 02′ 04.763″
- Apparent magnitude (V): 5.32

Characteristics

A
- Spectral type: B4Veshell
- U−B color index: −0.63
- B−V color index: −0.10
- R−I color index: −0.16

B
- Spectral type: B2Vn(e)
- U−B color index: −0.52
- B−V color index: −0.07

C
- Spectral type: B3V:nne
- B−V color index: −0.1

Astrometry
Radial velocity (R_{v})	17.20 km/s
Proper motion (μ)	RA: −6.86 mas/yr Dec.: −2.76 mas/yr
Parallax (π)	4.82±1.12 mas
Distance	approx. 700 ly (approx. 210 pc)
Absolute magnitude (M_{V})	−1.55

Details

A
Mass	8.7 M_{☉}
Luminosity	3,200 L_{☉}
Surface gravity (log g)	4.06 cgs
Temperature	18,070 K
Rotational velocity (v sin i)	346 km/s
Age	27.5 Myr

B
Mass	6.2 M_{☉}
Luminosity	1,600 L_{☉}
Rotational velocity (v sin i)	123 km/s

C
Mass	6 M_{☉}
Luminosity	1,300 L_{☉}
Rotational velocity (v sin i)	331 km/s

Other designations
- β Mon, Beta Monocerotis, Beta Mon, 11 Monocerotis, 11 Mon, STF 919, ADS 5107, CCDM J06288-0702, HIP 30867, (Note: The Hipparcos Catalogue entry for HIP 30867 includes all three of β Monocerotis A, B, and C. See component 1, component 2, and component 3, entries for HIP 30867, The Hipparcos and Tycho Catalogues, 1997, CDS ID I/239, accessed on line November 21, 2008.) WDS 06288-0702A.
- A: β^{1} Monocerotis, β^{1} Mon, Beta^{1} Monocerotis, Beta^{1} Mon, BD−06°1574, GC 8412, HD 45725, HR 2356
- B: BD−06°1575B, HD 45726, HR 2357
- C: BD−06°1575C, HD 45727, HR 2358

Database references
SIMBAD	data
- A
- B
- C

Beta Monocerotis (Beta Mon, β Monocerotis, β Mon) is a triple star system in the constellation of Monoceros. To the naked eye, it appears as a single star with an apparent visual magnitude of approximately 3.74, making it the brightest visible star in the constellation. A telescope shows a curved line of three pale blue stars (or pale yellow stars, depending on the scope's focus). William Herschel who discovered it in 1781 commented that it is "one of the most beautiful sights in the heavens". The star system consists of three Be stars, β Monocerotis A, β Monocerotis B, and β Monocerotis C. There is also an additional visual companion star that is probably not physically close to the other three stars.

== System ==
The three stars of β Monocerotis lie approximately in a straight line. Component B is 7" from component A, and component C a further 3" away. The stars have a common proper motion across the sky and very similar radial velocities. They share a single Hipparcos satellite identifier and are assumed to be at the same distance, around 700 light years based on their parallax.

β Monocerotis is classified as a variable star, although it is unclear which of the three components causes the brightness changes. The magnitude range is given as 3.77 to 3.84 in the Hipparcos photometric band.

== Beta Monocerotis A ==
Beta Monocerotis A (Beta Mon A, β Monocerotis A, β Mon A) is a Be shell star with a mass of approximately 7 solar masses and a luminosity of 3,200 times the Sun's.

== Beta Monocerotis B ==
Beta Monocerotis B (Beta Mon B / β Monocerotis B / β Mon B) is a Be star with a mass of approximately 6.2 solar masses and a luminosity of 1,600 times the Sun's.

== Beta Monocerotis C ==
Beta Monocerotis C (Beta Mon C / β Monocerotis C / β Mon C) is a Be star with a mass of approximately 6 solar masses and a luminosity of 1,300 times the Sun's. This star was observed to be double in speckle interferometric observations in 1988, but this has not been confirmed by later infrared observations.

== Visual companion ==
CCDM J06288-0702D
Observation data Epoch J2000.0 Equinox J2000.0 (ICRS)
- Constellation: Monoceros
- Right ascension: 06^{h} 28^{m} 50.3^{s}
- Declination: −07° 01′ 41″
- Apparent magnitude (V): 12.2

Position (relative to A)
Epoch of observation	1999
Angular distance	25.4″
Position angle	47°

Other designations
- ADS 5107 D, BD−06°1574D, WDS 06288-0702D.

Database references
SIMBAD	data

The triple star system has a visual companion, CCDM J06288-0702D, which has an apparent visual magnitude of approximately 12 and is visible approximately 25 arcseconds away from β Monocerotis A. It is probably not physically close to the other three stars, merely appearing next to them in the sky.
