= Zeta Pictoris =

Star in the constellation Pictor

Observation data Epoch J2000.0 Equinox J2000.0 (ICRS)
- Constellation: Pictor
- Right ascension: 05^{h} 19^{m} 22.13501^{s}
- Declination: −50° 36′ 21.4817″
- Apparent magnitude (V): +5.43

Characteristics
- Spectral type: F6 IV
- U−B color index: +0.01
- B−V color index: +0.52

Astrometry
Radial velocity (R_{v})	+43.8±0.2 km/s
Proper motion (μ)	RA: +23.314 mas/yr Dec.: +227.768 mas/yr
Parallax (π)	27.8694±0.0469 mas
Distance	117.0 ± 0.2 ly (35.88 ± 0.06 pc)
Absolute magnitude (M_{V})	2.65±0.04

Details
Mass	1.49 M_{☉}
Radius	2.31±0.08 R_{☉}
Luminosity	7.66+0.34 −0.33 (Note: From L = 10^(0.4*(4.74-(Mbol))), where L is the luminosity and Mbol the bolometric magnitude) L_{☉}
Surface gravity (log g)	3.89±0.10 cgs
Temperature	6,411±56 K
Metallicity [Fe/H]	+0.05±0.07 dex
Rotational velocity (v sin i)	5.6±1.0 km/s
Age	2.6 Gyr

Other designations
- ζ Pic, CD−50°1723, HD 35072, HIP 24829, HR 1767, SAO 233926

Database references
SIMBAD	data

ζ Pictoris, Latinised as Zeta Pictoris, is a solitary star in the southern constellation of Pictor. It is visible to the naked eye with an apparent visual magnitude of +5.43. Based upon an annual parallax shift of 27.87 mas as seen from the Earth, the system is located 117 light years distant.

This is an evolving F-type subgiant star with a stellar classification of F6 IV. It is a thin disk star with an estimated 1.49 times the mass of the Sun and about 2.31 times the Sun's radius. It radiates 7.66 times the Sun's luminosity from its photosphere at an effective temperature of 6,411 K. At the age of 2.6 billion years, Zeta Pictoris is spinning with a projected rotational velocity of 5.6 km/s.
