= HD 50499 =

Star in the constellation Puppis

Observation data Epoch J2000 Equinox ICRS
- Constellation: Puppis
- Right ascension: 06^{h} 52^{m} 02.02432^{s}
- Declination: −33° 54′ 56.0164″
- Apparent magnitude (V): 7.21

Characteristics
- Spectral type: G0/2 V
- B−V color index: 0.614±0.008

Astrometry
Radial velocity (R_{v})	+36.69±0.09 km/s
Proper motion (μ)	RA: −69.326 mas/yr Dec.: +68.089 mas/yr
Parallax (π)	21.5765±0.0258 mas
Distance	151.2 ± 0.2 ly (46.35 ± 0.06 pc)
Absolute magnitude (M_{V})	3.89

Details
Mass	1.31±0.07 M_{☉}
Radius	1.42±0.02 R_{☉}
Luminosity	2.38±0.005 L_{☉}
Surface gravity (log g)	4.42±0.05 cgs
Temperature	6,099±43 K
Metallicity [Fe/H]	0.38±0.03 dex
Rotation	22.4±1.0 d
Rotational velocity (v sin i)	4.313 km/s
Age	2.40±0.56 or 6.17 Gyr

Other designations
- CD−33°3304, GC 9010, HD 50499, HIP 32970, SAO 197294

Database references
SIMBAD	data

HD 50499 is a star in the constellation of constellation of Puppis. With an apparent visual magnitude of 7.21, this star is too faint to be in naked eye visibility. It is located at a distance of 151 light years from the Sun based on parallax, and is drifting further away with a radial velocity of +36.7 km/s.

This object is a G-type main-sequence star with a stellar classification of G0/2 V. It is positioned 0.6 magnitudes above the main sequence, which may be explained by a high metallicity and an older age. Vogt et al. (2005) estimated its age as about 6.2 billion years, although more recent estimates give a younger age of around 2.4 billion years. The star has 1.31 times the mass of the Sun and 1.42 times the Sun's radius. It is radiating 2.38 times the luminosity of the Sun from its photosphere at an effective temperature of 6,099 K. As of 2019, two exoplanets have been confirmed to be orbiting the star.

== Planetary system ==
The first planet discovered, HD 50499 b, is a gas giant with mass of 1.7 times Jupiter. It is a long period, taking 6.8 years to orbit the star. The planet's eccentric orbit passes through the average distance of 3.93 AU.

The planet was discovered by four team members including Steven Vogt in 2005 using their radial velocity method, which used to measure changes in red- and blue-shifting of the star that indicate the presence of planets caused by gravitational tug. There is also a linear trend in the radial velocities, which may indicate an additional outer planet. The best two-planet model gives a different period and mass for the inner planet (9.8 years and 3.4 Jupiter masses), with an outer planet of 2.1 Jupiter masses in a 37-year orbit. However the two-planet model does not represent a significant improvement over the model with one planet and a linear trend, so more observations are needed to constrain the parameters of the outer planet.

Rickman et al. (2019) gave an updated model of the planet and its orbit, and confirmed the presence of a second planet, HD 50499 c, with a period of about 24 years.

The HD 50499 planetary system
Companion (in order from star)	Mass	Semimajor axis (AU)	Orbital period (days)	Eccentricity	Inclination (°)	Radius
b	≥1.45±0.08 M_{J}	3.93±0.07	2483.7±18.3	0.27+0.04 −0.03	—	—
c	≥2.93+0.73 −0.18 M_{J}	9.02+1.73 −0.33	8619.9+2622.5 −405.4	0.00+0.14 −0.02	—	—

== See also ==
- HD 50554
