= HD 37124 =

Star in the constellation of Taurus

Observation data Epoch J2000.0 Equinox ICRS
- Constellation: Taurus
- Right ascension: 05^{h} 37^{m} 02.4866^{s}
- Declination: +20° 43′ 50.833″
- Apparent magnitude (V): 7.68

Characteristics
- Evolutionary stage: main sequence
- Spectral type: G4IV-V
- B−V color index: 0.667±0.008

Astrometry
Radial velocity (R_{v})	−23.02±0.09 km/s
Proper motion (μ)	RA: −79.554±0.026 mas/yr Dec.: −420.042±0.016 mas/yr
Parallax (π)	31.6093±0.0242 mas
Distance	103.18 ± 0.08 ly (31.64 ± 0.02 pc)
Absolute magnitude (M_{V})	5.05

Details
Mass	0.81±0.01 M_{☉}
Radius	0.92±0.02 R_{☉}
Luminosity	0.839±0.003 L_{☉}
Surface gravity (log g)	4.41±0.01 cgs
Temperature	5,763±22 K
Metallicity [Fe/H]	−0.38±0.01 dex
Rotational velocity (v sin i)	3.6 km/s
Age	11.8±1.2 Gyr

Other designations
- BD+20°1018, GJ 209, HD 37124, HIP 26381, SAO 77323, G 100-27

Database references
SIMBAD	data
Exoplanet Archive	data

HD 37124 is a star in the equatorial constellation of Taurus (the Bull), positioned about a half degree to the SSW of the bright star Zeta Tauri. The apparent visual magnitude of this star is 7.68, which is too dim to be visible to the naked eye. It is located at a distance of 103 light years from the Sun based on parallax, but is drifting closer with a radial velocity of −23 km/s. Three extrasolar planets have been found to orbit the star.

The stellar classification of HD 37124 is G4IV-V, showing a spectrum with blended traits of a main sequence star and a more evolved subgiant star. It is a quiet star with a low activity index. This star is smaller than the Sun, with 81–92% of the mass of the Sun and around 92% of the Sun's radius. It is an older, thick disk star with an age of around 11 billion years, and is spinning with a projected rotational velocity of 3.6 km/s. The metallicity of the star, what astronomers term the abundance of heavier elements, is much lower than in the Sun with an iron abundance of 35–41%. It is radiating 77–84% of the Sun's luminosity from its photosphere at an effective temperature of 5,763 K.

== Planetary system ==
As of 2011, three extrasolar planets have been found to orbit the star. The first planet, HD 37124 b, was detected by the Keck observatory through the radial velocity method; its discovery was announced on 1 November 1999. HD 37124 b was discovered orbiting its parent star around the inner edge of the habitable zone, causing the planet to have a somewhat similar insolation to that of Venus. A second planet became apparent by 2003, thought to orbit in a 1940 days on an eccentric orbit, but this was subsequently found to be unstable. Solving this, a three-planet solution was announced in 2005: this contained a second planet (HD 37124 c) orbiting at the outer edge of the habitable zone with an insolation similar to that of Mars, and a third planet, (HD 37124 d). While not obviously in any orbital resonances in 2005, an updated solution announced in 2011 found planets c and d to likely be in a 2:1 resonance.

The HD 37124 planetary system
Companion (in order from star)	Mass	Semimajor axis (AU)	Orbital period (days)	Eccentricity	Inclination (°)	Radius
b	≥0.675±0.017 M_{J}	0.53364±0.00020	154.378±0.089	0.054±0.028	—	—
c	≥0.652±0.052 M_{J}	1.7100±0.0065	885.5±5.1	0.125±0.055	—	—
d	≥0.69±0.059 M_{J}	2.807±0.038	1,862±38	0.16±0.14	—	—

== See also ==
- Upsilon Andromedae
- HIP 14810
