= HD 8574 =

Star in the constellation Pisces

HD 8574 / Bélénos
Observation data Epoch J2000.0 Equinox ICRS
- Constellation: Pisces
- Right ascension: 01^{h} 25^{m} 12.51573^{s}
- Declination: +28° 34′ 00.1030″
- Apparent magnitude (V): +7.12

Characteristics
- Evolutionary stage: main sequence
- Spectral type: F8
- B−V color index: 0.577±0.011

Astrometry
| Radial velocity (R_{v}) | +19.05±0.14 km/s |
| Proper motion (μ) | RA: 251.270 mas/yr Dec.: −157.570 mas/yr |
| Parallax (π) | 22.3056±0.0218 mas |
| Distance | 146.2 ± 0.1 ly (44.83 ± 0.04 pc) |
| Absolute magnitude (M_{V}) | 3.88 |

Details
| Mass | 1.144±0.003 M_{☉} |
| Radius | 1.39±0.01 R_{☉} |
| Luminosity | 2.335±0.001 L_{☉} |
| Surface gravity (log g) | 4.21±0.03 cgs |
| Temperature | 6,065±6 K |
| Metallicity [Fe/H] | −0.06 dex |
| Rotational velocity (v sin i) | 6.6 km/s |
| Age | 5.0±0.1 Gyr |

Other designations
- Bélénos, BD+27°225, GC 1710, HD 8574, HIP 6643, SAO 74702, LTT 10508, NLTT 4709

Database references
| SIMBAD | data |
| Exoplanet Archive | data |

HD 8574 is a single star in the equatorial constellation of Pisces. It can be viewed with binoculars or a telescope, but not with the naked eye having a low apparent visual magnitude of +7.12. The distance to this object is 146 light-years based on parallax, and it has an absolute magnitude of 3.88. The star is drifting further away from the Sun with a radial velocity of +19 km/s. It has a relatively high proper motion, advancing across the celestial sphere at the rate of 0.298 arc seconds per annum.

The star HD 8574 is named Bélénos. The name was selected in the NameExoWorlds campaign by France, during the 100th anniversary of the IAU. Bélénos was the god of light, of the Sun, and of health in Gaulish mythology.

This object is an F-type star with a stellar classification of F8 and unknown luminosity class. The star is five billion years old and is spinning with a projected rotational velocity of 6.6 km/s. It has 1.1 times the mass of the Sun and 1.4 times the Sun's radius. The star is radiating 2.3 times the luminosity of the Sun from its photosphere at an effective temperature of 6,065 K.

In 2001, an extrasolar planet in an eccentric orbit was announced by the European Southern Observatory. The discovery was published in 2003. This object has at least double the mass of Jupiter and has an eccentric orbit with a period of 0.62 years.

The HD 8574 planetary system
| Companion (in order from star) | Mass | Semimajor axis (AU) | Orbital period (days) | Eccentricity | Inclination (°) | Radius |
|---|---|---|---|---|---|---|
| b / Bélisama | > 1.96±0.18 M_{J} | 0.76±0.04 | 225±1.14 | 0.37±0.082 | — | — |

== See also ==
- List of extrasolar planets
