= HD 85390 =

Star in the constellation Vela

HD 85390 / Natasha
Observation data Epoch J2000.0 Equinox ICRS
- Constellation: Vela
- Right ascension: 09^{h} 50^{m} 02.4966^{s}
- Declination: −49° 47′ 24.959″
- Apparent magnitude (V): 8.54

Characteristics
- Evolutionary stage: main sequence
- Spectral type: K1.5V
- Apparent magnitude (B): 9.395
- Apparent magnitude (J): 7.012±0.024
- Apparent magnitude (H): 6.612±0.033
- Apparent magnitude (K): 6.491±0.023
- B−V color index: 0.855±0.003

Astrometry
Radial velocity (R_{v})	+32.94±0.13 km/s
Proper motion (μ)	RA: +24.523(17) mas/yr Dec.: −60.128(14) mas/yr
Parallax (π)	29.8273±0.0153 mas
Distance	109.35 ± 0.06 ly (33.53 ± 0.02 pc)
Absolute magnitude (M_{V})	5.99

Details
Mass	0.81±0.02 M_{☉} 0.813+0.043 −0.038 M_{☉}
Radius	0.78±0.01 R_{☉} 0.816+0.010 −0.011 R_{☉}
Luminosity	0.39±0.01 L_{☉}
Surface gravity (log g)	4.56±0.02 cgs
Temperature	5,170±17 K 5,182±20 K
Metallicity [Fe/H]	−0.04 dex
Rotational velocity (v sin i)	1.97±0.36 km/s
Age	6.8±2.9 Gyr; 8.893+4.400 −4.017 Gyr

Other designations
- Natasha, CD−49°4727, HD 85390, HIP 48235, SAO 221526, 2MASS J09500249-4947250

Database references
SIMBAD	data
Exoplanet Archive	data

HD 85390 is a star with an exoplanet companion in the southern constellation of Vela. It was given the proper name Natasha by Zambia during the 100th anniversary of the IAU. Natasha means "thank you" in many languages of Zambia. This star is too faint to be seen with the naked eye, having an apparent visual magnitude of 8.54. It is located at a distance of 109 light-years from the Sun based on parallax, and is drifting further away with a radial velocity of 33 km/s.

The stellar classification of HD 85390 is K1.5V, showing this to be a K-type main-sequence star. It is an older star with age estimates of 7–9 billion years, and is not considered chromospherically active. The star is spinning with a projected rotational velocity of 2 km/s. It is smaller, cooler, dimmer, and less massive than the Sun, but the metallicity is near solar.

== Planetary system ==
The planet HD 85390 b was detected by the radial velocity method in 2011. It is following an eccentric orbit at a distance of 1.4 AU from the host star. An additional planet in the system was suspected since 2013, only to be refuted in 2019.

The HD 85390 planetary system
Companion (in order from star)	Mass	Semimajor axis (AU)	Orbital period (days)	Eccentricity	Inclination (°)	Radius
b (Madalitso)	≥0.099±0.010 M_{J}	1.373±0.035	799.52±2.41	0.50±0.05	—	—
