= HD 130322 =

Star in the constellation Virgo

HD 130322 / Mönch
Observation data Epoch J2000.0 Equinox ICRS
- Constellation: Virgo
- Right ascension: 14^{h} 47^{m} 32.7262^{s}
- Declination: −00° 16′ 53.308″
- Apparent magnitude (V): 8.04

Characteristics
- Evolutionary stage: main sequence
- Spectral type: K0V
- B−V color index: 0.781±0.002

Astrometry
| Radial velocity (R_{v}) | −12.388±0.0005 km/s |
| Proper motion (μ) | RA: −130.476(25) mas/yr Dec.: −140.246(25) mas/yr |
| Parallax (π) | 31.3356±0.0262 mas |
| Distance | 104.08 ± 0.09 ly (31.91 ± 0.03 pc) |
| Absolute magnitude (M_{V}) | 5.54 |

Details
| Mass | 0.92±0.03 M_{☉} |
| Radius | 0.85±0.04 R_{☉} |
| Luminosity | 0.62 L_{☉} |
| Surface gravity (log g) | 4.52±0.06 cgs |
| Temperature | 5,387±44 K |
| Metallicity [Fe/H] | −0.02 dex |
| Rotation | 26.53±0.70 d |
| Rotational velocity (v sin i) | 0.5±0.5 km/s |
| Age | 6.1±2.9 Gyr |

Other designations
- Mönch, BD+00 3243, HD 130322, HIP 72339, LTT 5873, NLTT 38386

Database references
| SIMBAD | The star |
- planet b
| Exoplanet Archive | data |

HD 130322 is a star with a close orbiting exoplanet in the constellation of Virgo. The distance to this system is 104 light-years, as determined using parallax measurements. It is drifting closer to the Sun with a radial velocity of −12.4 km/s. With an apparent visual magnitude of 8.04, it is too dim to be visible to the naked eye; requiring binoculars or a small telescope to view. Being almost exactly on the celestial equator the star is visible everywhere in the world except for the North Pole. The star shows a high proper motion, traversing the celestial sphere at an angular rate of 0.197 arcsec yr^{−1}.

The spectrum of this star presents as a K-type main-sequence star, an orange dwarf, with a stellar classification of K0V. The star has 92% of the mass of the Sun and 85% of the Sun's radius. It is spinning with a rotation period of 26.5 days. HD 130322 is radiating 62% of the luminosity of the Sun from its photosphere at an effective temperature of 5,387 K. It is estimated to be around six billion years old.

The star HD 130322 is named Mönch and its companion is Eiger. The names were selected in the NameExoWorlds campaign by Switzerland, during the 100th anniversary of the IAU. Mönch and Eiger are prominent peaks of the Bernese Alps.

== Planetary system ==
In 2000, an extrasolar planet was discovered orbiting the star using Doppler spectroscopy. As the inclination of the orbital plane is unknown, only a lower bound on the mass can be estimated. Most likely this is a hot Jupiter as it is orbiting close to the host star and has at least the mass of Jupiter.

The star rotates at an inclination of 76^{+14}_{−42} degrees relative to Earth. It has been assumed that the planet shares that inclination. But several "hot Jupiters" are known to be oblique relative to the stellar axis.

The HD 130322 planetary system
| Companion (in order from star) | Mass | Semimajor axis (AU) | Orbital period (days) | Eccentricity | Inclination (°) | Radius |
|---|---|---|---|---|---|---|
| b (Eiger) | >1.089 ± 0.98 M_{J} | 0.0910 ± 0.053 | 10.70871±0.00018 | 0.029±0.016 | — | — |

== See also ==
- Lists of exoplanets
- Hot Jupiter
- Exoplanet
