= HD 45652 b =

Gas giant exoplanet in the constellation of Monoceros

HD 45652 b / Viriato
Discovery
- Discovered by: Santos et al.
- Discovery site: Haute-Provence Observatory, France
- Discovery date: May 2008
- Detection method: radial velocity from ELODIE

Orbital characteristics
- Semi-major axis: 0.237±0.011 AU
- Eccentricity: 0.607±0.026
- Orbital period (sidereal): 44.073±0.0048 d
- Time of periastron: 2463720.92±0.45
- Argument of periastron: 227.7±5.6
- Semi-amplitude: 33.2±1.8
- Star: HD 45652

HD 45652 b, also named Viriato, is a gas giant extrasolar planet orbiting at only 0.23 AU from the star HD 45652, with an orbital period of 44 days. It has mass at least half that of Jupiter. As it was detected using the radial velocity method, its true mass is dependent on the inclination of its orbit; if it is low, then the true mass will be larger. Also, its radius is not known. This planet was discovered by measurements taken by the ELODIE spectrograph from 2005 and 2006, and later confirmed by CORALIE and SOPHIE between 2006 and 2007. The discovery was announced in May 2008.

== Naming ==
HD 45652 b, was officially named Viriato on 17 December 2019 after the IAU100 press conference in Paris by the IAU (International Astronomical Union).
