= HD 4208 =

Star in the constellation Sculptor

HD 4208 / Cocibolca
Observation data Epoch J2000.0 Equinox ICRS
- Constellation: Sculptor
- Right ascension: 00^{h} 44^{m} 26.65067^{s}
- Declination: −26° 30′ 56.4555″
- Apparent magnitude (V): 7.78

Characteristics
- Evolutionary stage: main sequence
- Spectral type: G7V Fe-1 CH-0.5
- B−V color index: 0.664±0.004

Astrometry
Radial velocity (R_{v})	+56.77±0.09 km/s
Proper motion (μ)	RA: +313.556 mas/yr Dec.: +149.324 mas/yr
Parallax (π)	29.3187±0.0322 mas
Distance	111.2 ± 0.1 ly (34.11 ± 0.04 pc)
Absolute magnitude (M_{V})	5.23

Details
Mass	0.883±0.024 M_{☉}
Radius	0.846±0.028 R_{☉}
Luminosity	0.71±0.004 L_{☉}
Surface gravity (log g)	4.501±0.036 cgs
Temperature	5,717±33 K
Metallicity [Fe/H]	−0.28±0.02 dex
Rotational velocity (v sin i)	4.4 km/s
Age	6.6±2.1 gyr 3.813±2.970 Gyr

Other designations
- Cocibolca, CD−27°223, GJ 9024, HD 4208, HIP 3479, SAO 166526, LTT 410

Database references
SIMBAD	data
Exoplanet Archive	data
ARICNS	data

HD 4208 is a star with an orbiting exoplanetary companion in the southern constellation of Sculptor. It has a yellow hue with an apparent visual magnitude of 7.78, making it too dim to be visible to the naked eye. But with binoculars or small telescope it should be an easy target. This object is located at a distance of 111.2 light-years from the Sun based on parallax, and is drifting further away with a radial velocity of +57 km/s.

The star HD 4208 is named Cocibolca. The name was selected in the NameExoWorlds campaign by Nicaragua, during the 100th anniversary of the IAU. Cocibolca is the Nahuatl name for the Lake Nicaragua.

This is a G-type main-sequence star with a stellar classification of G7V Fe-1 CH-0.5, where the suffix notation indicates underabundances of iron and carbyne in the spectrum. It is roughly 6.6 billion years old and is spinning with a projected rotational velocity of 4.4 km/s. The star has 86% of the Sun's mass and radius, and is radiating 71% of the Sun's luminosity from its photosphere at an effective temperature of 5,717 K.

In 2001, a planet was discovered orbiting the star by means of the radial velocity method. This body is orbiting 1.66 AU from the host star with a period of 2.28 years and a low eccentricity of 0.042. The position of this planet near the star's habitable zone means that it will have a strong gravitational perturbation effect on any potential Earth-mass planet that may be orbiting within this region.

The HD 4208 planetary system
Companion (in order from star)	Mass	Semimajor axis (AU)	Orbital period (days)	Eccentricity	Inclination (°)	Radius
b / Xolotlan	≥ 0.810+0.014 −0.015 M_{J}	1.662±0.015	832.97+2.15 −1.89	0.042+0.039 −0.029	—	—

== See also ==
- HD 4203
- HD 4308
- List of extrasolar planets
