= HD 4208 b =

Exoplanet in the constellation of Sculptor

HD 4208 b / Xolotlan
Discovery
- Discovered by: California and Carnegie; Planet Search
- Discovery site: Keck telescope
- Discovery date: 15 October 2001
- Detection method: Doppler Spectroscopy

Orbital characteristics
- Apastron: 1.736 AU (259,700,000 km)
- Periastron: 1.564 AU (234,000,000 km)
- Semi-major axis: 1.650 ± 0.096 AU (246,800,000 ± 14,400,000 km)
- Eccentricity: 0.052 ± 0.040
- Orbital period (sidereal): 828.0 ± 8.1 d 2.267 y
- Time of periastron: 2,451,040 ± 120
- Argument of periastron: 345
- Semi-amplitude: 19.06 ± 0.73
- Star: HD 4208

Physical characteristics
- Mass: >0.804 ± 0.073 M_{J}

HD 4208 b, officially named Xolotlan, is an extrasolar planet discovered by the California and Carnegie Planet Search team using the Keck telescope. The planet is probably somewhat less massive than Jupiter, although only its minimum mass is known. Its orbital distance is 1.67 AU, slightly further than Mars, and its eccentricity is low.

The planet HD 4208 b is named Xolotlan. The name was selected in the NameExoWorlds campaign by Nicaragua, during the 100th anniversary of the IAU. Xolotlan is the name of Lake Managua in Nahuatl language.
