= Nu Canis Majoris =

The Bayer designation Nu Canis Majoris (ν CMa / ν Canis Majoris) is shared by three star systems, in the constellation Canis Major:

- ν^{1} Canis Majoris
- ν^{2} Canis Majoris
- ν^{3} Canis Majoris

They are separated by the different asterism in Chinese astronomy. ν^{1} Canis Majoris was not any member of asterism. ν^{2} Canis Majoris was stand alone in asterism 野雞 (Yě Jī), Wild Cockerel. ν^{3} Canis Majoris was member of asterism 軍市 (Jūn Shì), Market for Soldiers. Both of asterisms were lied in Well mansion.
