= Xi Canis Majoris =

The Bayer designation Xi Canis Majoris (ξ CMa / ξ Canis Majoris) is shared by two star systems, in the constellation Canis Major:

- ξ¹ Canis Majoris
- ξ² Canis Majoris

They are separated by 0.86° on the sky.

ξ¹ Canis Majoris was member of asterism 軍市 (Jūn Shì), Market for Soldiers, Well mansion. ξ² Canis Majoris was not any member of asterism.
