= Mu Canis Majoris =

Star in the constellation Canis Major

- Location of μ Canis Majoris (circled)

Observation data Epoch J2000.0 Equinox ICRS
| Constellation | Canis Major |
- μ CMa A
| Right ascension | 06^{h} 56^{m} 06.6459^{s} |
| Declination | −14° 02′ 36.351″ |
- Apparent magnitude (V): 5.27
- μ CMa B
| Right ascension | 06^{h} 56^{m} 06.5891^{s} |
| Declination | −14° 02′ 33.633″ |
- Apparent magnitude (V): 7.32

Characteristics
- Spectral type: K2/3 III + B9/A0 V

Astrometry

μ CMa A
| Radial velocity (R_{v}) | 18.1±0.1 km/s |
| Proper motion (μ) | RA: −1.106 mas/yr Dec.: +6.383 mas/yr |
| Parallax (π) | 3.4219±0.0937 mas |
| Distance | 950 ± 30 ly (292 ± 8 pc) |
| Absolute magnitude (M_{V}) | −2.22 |

μ CMa B
| Proper motion (μ) | RA: +0.355 mas/yr Dec.: +6.594 mas/yr |
| Parallax (π) | 3.4079±0.0551 mas |
| Distance | 960 ± 20 ly (293 ± 5 pc) |

Orbit
| Primary | A |
| Name | B |
| Semi-major axis (a) | 829 AU |
| Eccentricity (e) | 0.62+0.29 −0.23 |

Details

μ CMa A
| Mass | 5.4 M_{☉} |
| Radius | 80 R_{☉} |
| Luminosity | 1,660 L_{☉} |
| Surface gravity (log g) | 1.14 cgs |
| Temperature | 4,123 K |
| Rotational velocity (v sin i) | ≤ 5 km/s |
| Age | 100 Myr |

μ CMa B
| Mass | 1.6 M_{☉} |
| Surface gravity (log g) | 2.70 cgs |
| Temperature | 5,034 K |

Other designations
- μ CMa, 18 Canis Majoris, BD−13°1741, HIP 33345, HR 2593, SAO 152123
- μ CMa A: HD 51250
- μ CMa B: HD 51251

Database references
| SIMBAD | A |
- B

Mu Canis Majoris is a binary star system in the southern constellation of Canis Major. The pair can be located a little to the southwest of the point midway between Gamma and Theta Canis Majoris, and the components can be split with a small telescope. Their name is a Bayer designation that is Latinized from μ Canis Majoris, and abbreviated as Mu CMa or μ CMa. The system is faintly visible to the naked eye with a combined apparent visual magnitude of 5.12. Based upon an annual parallax shift of 3.42 mas as seen from Earth, this system is located roughly 950–960 light years from the Sun.

Grotius assigned the name Isis to this star, but the name, now obsolete, belonged rather to Gamma Canis Majoris.

As of 2011, the pair had an angular separation of 2.77 arc seconds along a position angle of 343.9°. The orange-hued primary member, component A, is an evolved K-type giant star with a stellar classification of K2/3 III and a visual magnitude of 5.27. It has 5.4 times the mass, 80 times the radius, and 1,660 times the luminosity of the Sun. The base magnitude 7.32 companion, component B, is a hybrid B/A-type main-sequence star with a class of B9/A0 V. It has 1.6 times the mass of the Sun and is the hotter star, having an effective temperature of 5,034 K, compared to 4,123 K for the primary.

The system has two visual companions. As of 2008, magnitude 10.32 component C lies at an angular separation of 86.90″, while magnitude 10.64 component D is at a separation of 105.0″. Mu CMa should not be confused with the 9th magnitude variable star MU CMa located near NGC 2360.
