= Nu2 Canis Majoris b =

Water cloud jovian extrasolar planet in the constellation Canis Major

Nu^{2} Canis Majoris b
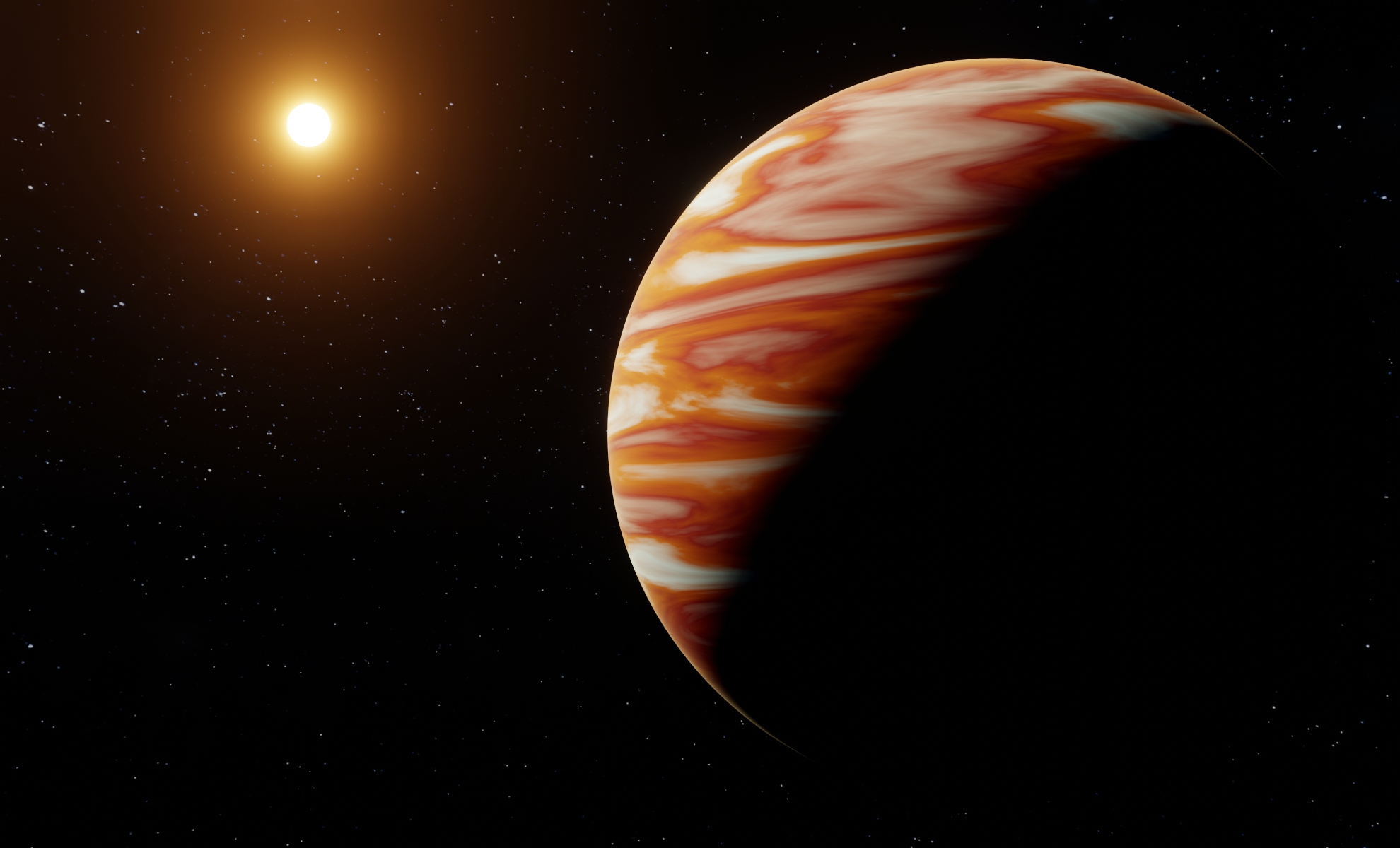
- Artist's impression

Discovery
- Discovered by: Wittenmyer, Robert A
- Discovery date: December 2011
- Detection method: Radial Velocity

Orbital characteristics
- Semi-major axis: 1.9 ± 0.1 AU (284,000,000 ± 15,000,000 km)
- Eccentricity: 0.14 ± 0.06
- Orbital period (sidereal): 763 ± 17 d
- Time of periastron: 2455520 ± 89
- Argument of periastron: 12 ± 41
- Star: Nu^{2} Canis Majoris

Nu^{2} Canis Majoris b, (7 CMa b) is a water cloud jovian extrasolar planet orbiting the star Nu^{2} Canis Majoris, approximately 64.71 light years away in the constellation of Canis Major. It was discovered in 2011 by Wittenmyer, R. by radial velocity.
