= NGC 2216 =

Spiral galaxy

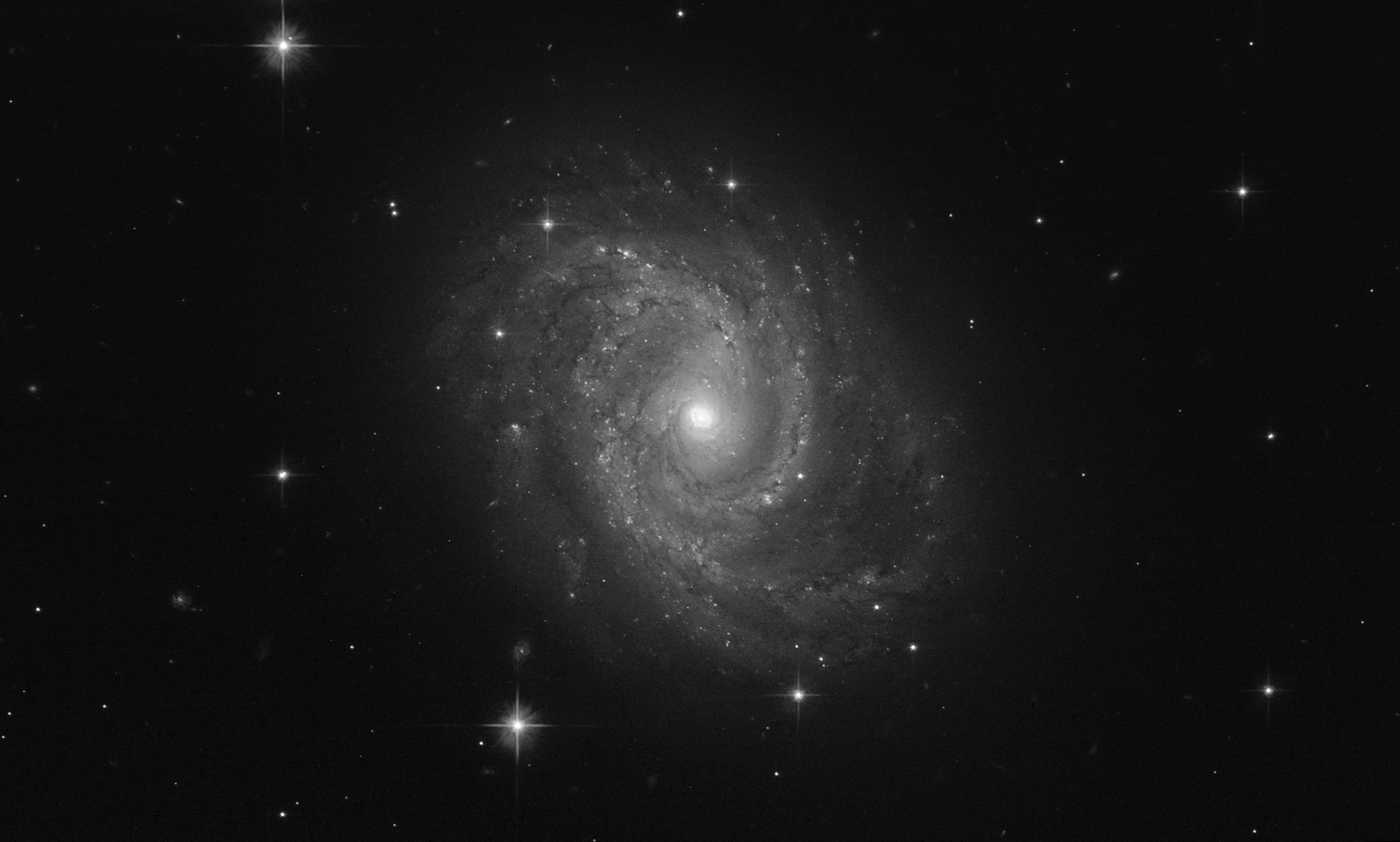

Observation data (J2000 epoch)
- Constellation: Canis Major
- Right ascension: 06^{h} 21^{m} 30.7252^{s}
- Declination: +22° 05′ 14.788″
- Redshift: 0.009593 ± 4.00e-5
- Magnitude (K): 0.026

Characteristics
- Type: SAB(r)ab: HII

Other designations
- NGC 2178, PGC 18322, ESO 086-053, AM 0602-634, 2MASX J06024755-6345490

NGC 2216 is an intermediate spiral galaxy in the constellation Canis Major. The galaxy was first discovered in 1835 by astronomer John Herschel.
