= USS Muliphen =

Andromeda-class attack cargo ship

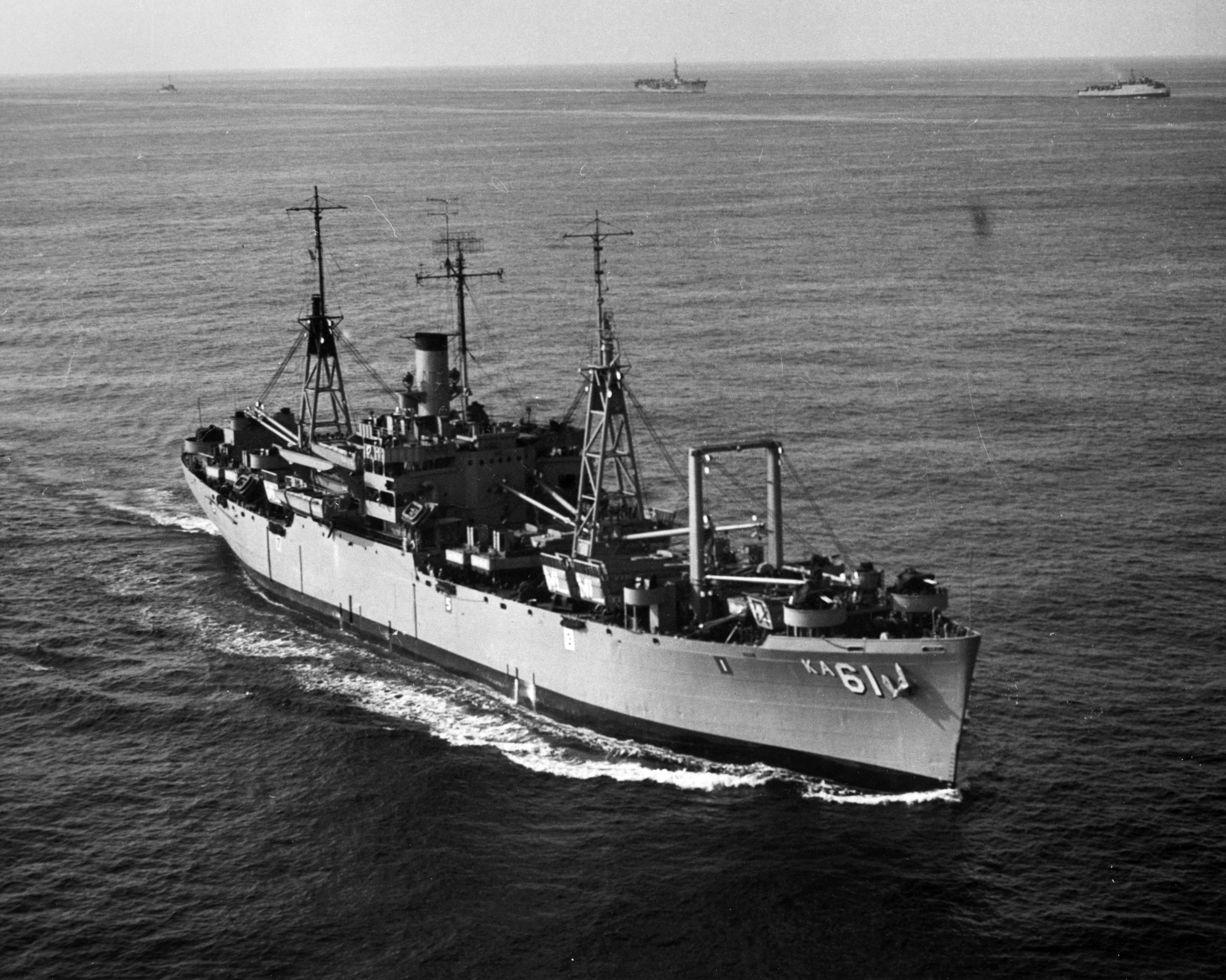

History
- Name: USS Muliphen
- Namesake: The star Muliphen in the constellation Canis Major
- Builder: Federal Shipbuilding and Drydock Company, Kearny, New Jersey
- Laid down: 13 May 1944
- Launched: 26 August 1944
- Acquired: 21 October 1944
- Commissioned: 23 October 1944
- Decommissioned: 28 August 1970
- Reclassified: LKA-61, 1 January 1969
- Stricken: 1 January 1977
- Honors and awards: 2 battle stars (World War II)
- Fate: Sunk as an artificial reef off Fort Pierce, Florida, 21 January 1989

General characteristics
- Class & type: Andromeda-class attack cargo ship
- Type: Type C2-S-B1
- Displacement: 7,360 long tons (7,478 t)
- Length: 459 ft 2 in (139.95 m)
- Beam: 63 ft (19 m)
- Draft: 26 ft 4 in (8.03 m)
- Speed: 16.5 knots (30.6 km/h; 19.0 mph)
- Complement: 246
- Armament: 1 × 5"/38 caliber gun mount; 4 × twin 40 mm gun mounts; 18 × 20 mm gun mounts

USS Muliphen (AKA-61/LKA-61) was an Andromeda-class attack cargo ship in service with the United States Navy from 1944 to 1970. She was sunk as an artificial reef in 1989.

== History ==
Muliphen was named after Muliphen, a star in the constellation Canis Major. She was laid down under Maritime Commission contract on 13 May 1944 by Federal Shipbuilding and Drydock Co., Kearny, N.J., launched on 26 August 1944, sponsored by Mrs. John Hascock, acquired by the Navy on 21 October 1944, and commissioned on 23 October 1944.

=== 1944–1945 ===
Following shakedown in Chesapeake Bay, Muliphen sailed on 1 December 1944 to operate with the Fleet Sonar School, Key West, Florida. On 14 December, she steamed for the Pacific where she joined Transport Division 43 off Pearl Harbor, and sailed to prepare for the invasion of Iwo Jima at Eniwetok, arriving on 5 February 1945. Muliphen arrived off Iwo Jima on 19 February, unloaded until 4 March, then retired to Saipan.

She departed on 27 March for the invasion of Okinawa, took part in a feint landing on 1 April, and repeated the feint the following day. Held in reserve off Okinawa until 10 April, she sailed then for Saipan and cargo duty between the Marianas and Solomons. She arrived Manila on 18 September with a cargo of underwater demolition gear, and spent the next three months carrying occupation troops to Japan from the Philippines, until sailing for Seattle on 24 November.

=== 1946–1970 ===
Serving with the Naval Transportation Service, for the next four years she carried men and supplies to Asiatic and Pacific ports, and supplied Point Barrow, Alaska in 1946 and 1947.

In 1950 Muliphen transferred to the Atlantic Fleet Amphibious Amphibious Force, based at Norfolk. The following decade she rotated in a steady schedule of Caribbean and Mediterranean deployments. In 1958 she participated in the amphibious landings at Beirut, Lebanon, when a prompt response by the 6th Fleet prevented Communist subversion of Lebanon's government. Continuing similar duty in the 1960s, she also took part in NATO exercises and the training of Naval Academy midshipmen.

On 1 January 1969, Muliphen was redesignated LKA-61.

=== Decommissioning and fate ===
Muliphen was decommissioned on 28 August 1970, and transferred to the Maritime Administration for lay up in the National Defense Reserve Fleet. The ship was struck from the Naval Vessel Register on 1 January 1977, and on 21 January 1989 was sunk as an artificial reef in a depth of 175 ft (53 m) of water off Fort Pierce, Florida at 27°24.331′N 80°00.337′W. The wreck is used as a recreational dive site.

== Awards ==
Muliphen received two battle stars for World War II service.
