= NGC 2283 =

Galaxy in the constellation Canis Major

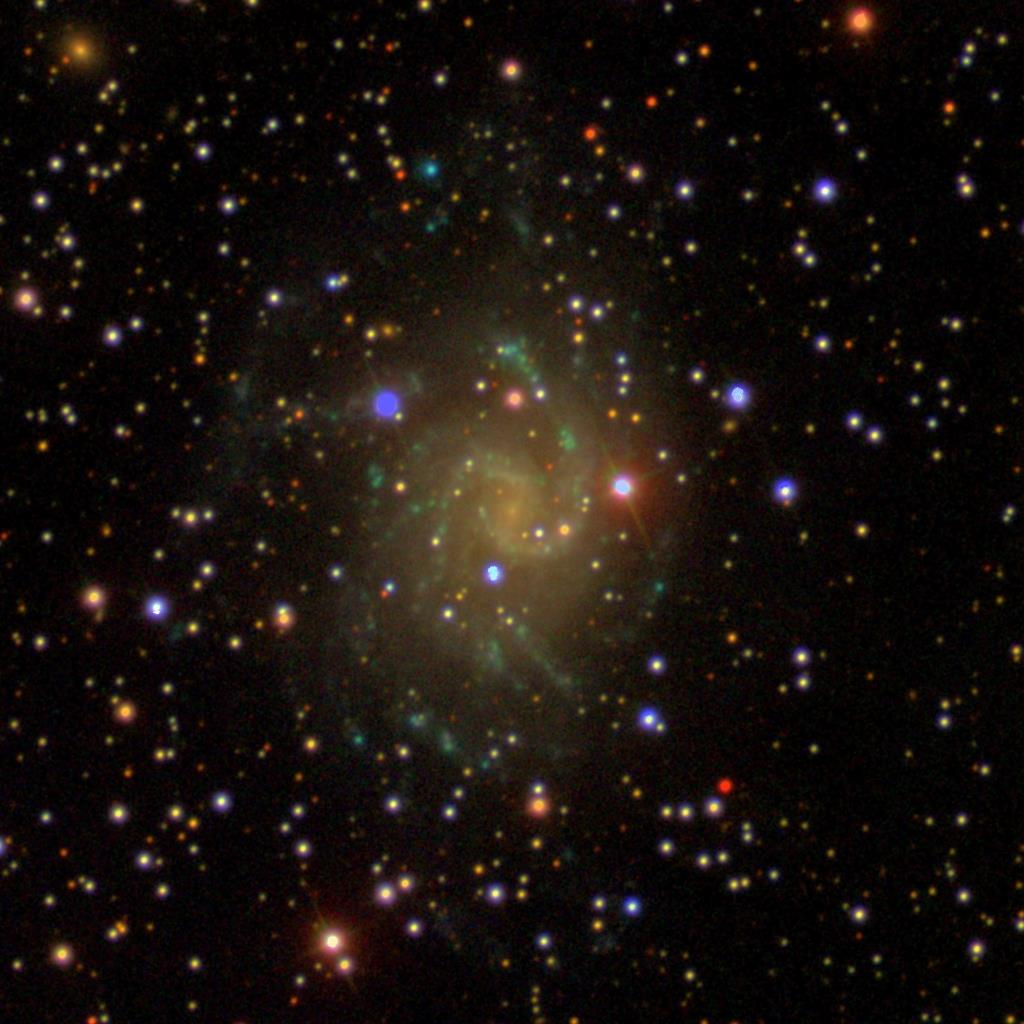
- NGC 2283 imaged by SDSS

Observation data (J2000 epoch)
- Constellation: Canis Major
- Right ascension: 06^{h} 45^{m} 52.7853^{s}
- Declination: −18° 12′ 37.319″
- Redshift: 0.002805
- Heliocentric radial velocity: 841 ± 3 km/s
- Distance: 47.8 ± 3.4 Mly (14.66 ± 1.04 Mpc)
- Group or cluster: RR 140
- Apparent magnitude (V): 11.5

Characteristics
- Type: SB(s)cd
- Size: ~56,500 ly (17.31 kpc) (estimated)
- Apparent size (V): 3.6′ × 2.7′

Other designations
- ESO 557- G 013, RR 140b, IRAS 06436-1809, 2MASS J06455276-1812374, MCG -03-18-002, PGC 19562

NGC 2283 is a barred spiral galaxy in the constellation of Canis Major. Its velocity with respect to the cosmic microwave background is 994 ± 11 km/s, which corresponds to a Hubble distance of 14.66 ± 1.04 Mpc (~48 million light-years). It was discovered by German-British astronomer William Herschel on 6 February 1785.

NGC 2283 forms a physical pair with galaxy IC 2171, collectively named RR 140, with an optical separation of 1593″ between them.

SIMBAD lists NGC 2283 as an active galaxy nucleus candidate.

One supernova has been observed in NGC 2283: SN 2023axu (Type II, mag. 15.6404) was discovered by the Distance Less Than 40 Mpc Survey (DLT40) on 28 January 2023.

== Image gallery ==
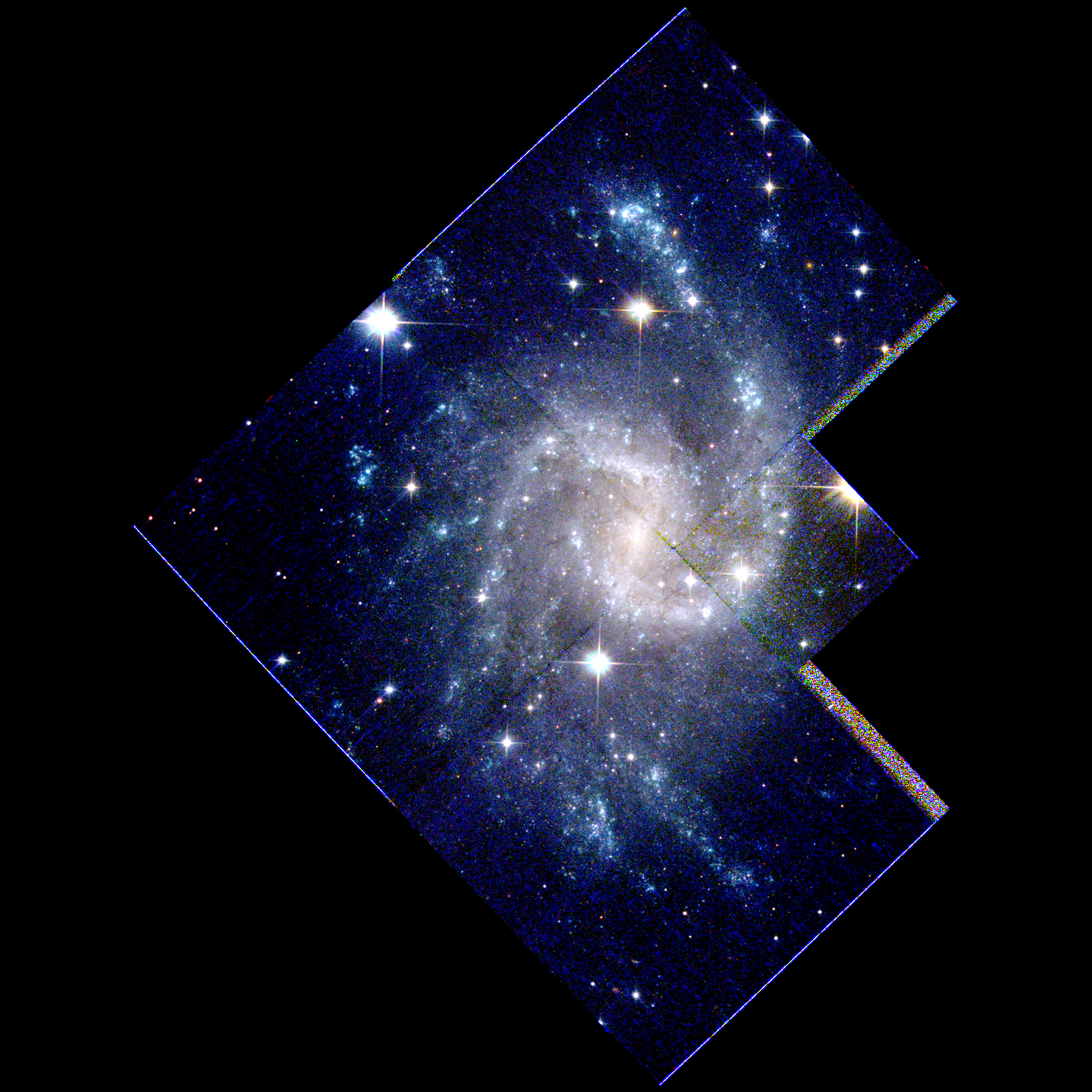
Hubble Space Telescope image of NGC 2283

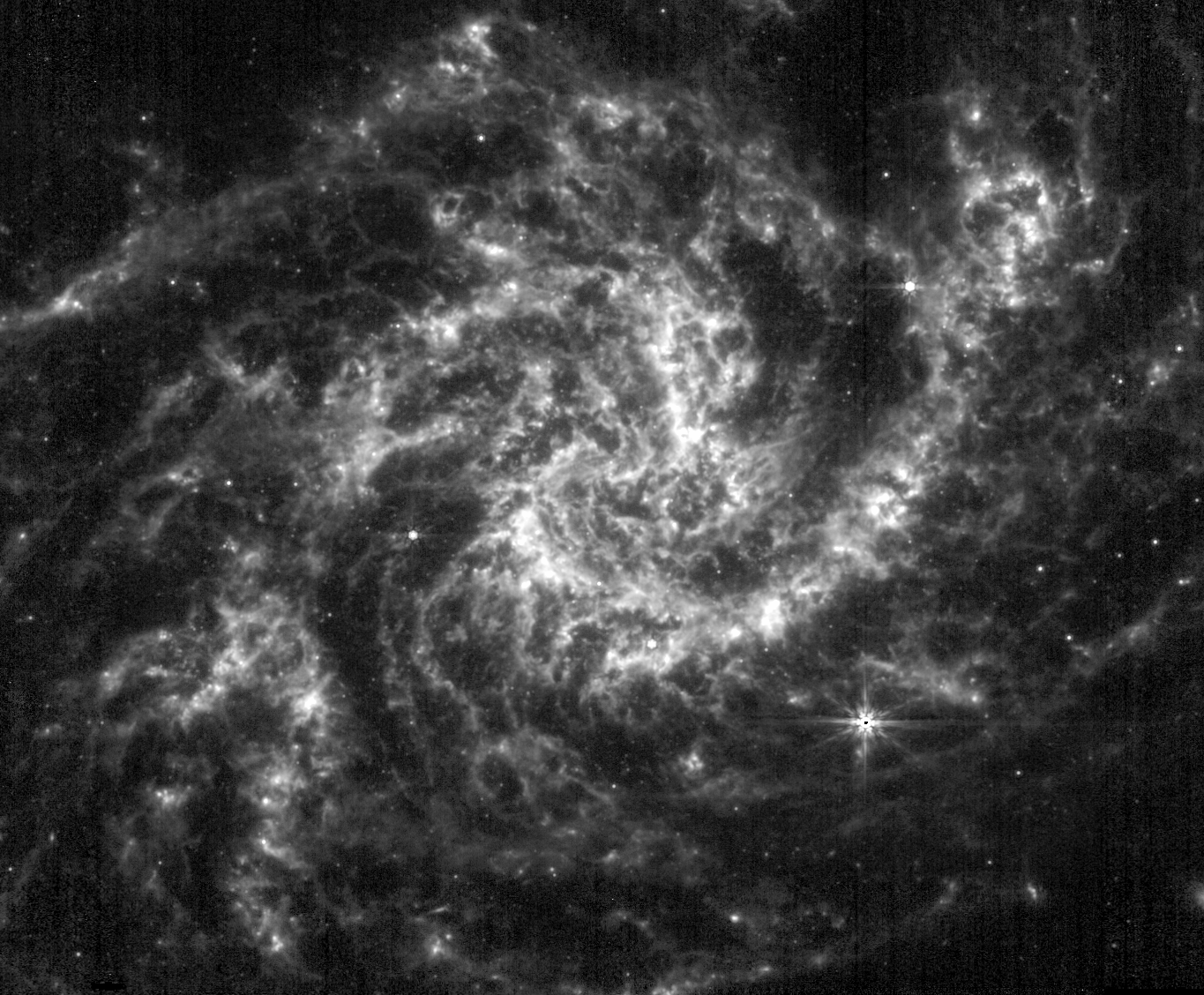
James Webb Space Telescope image of NGC 2283

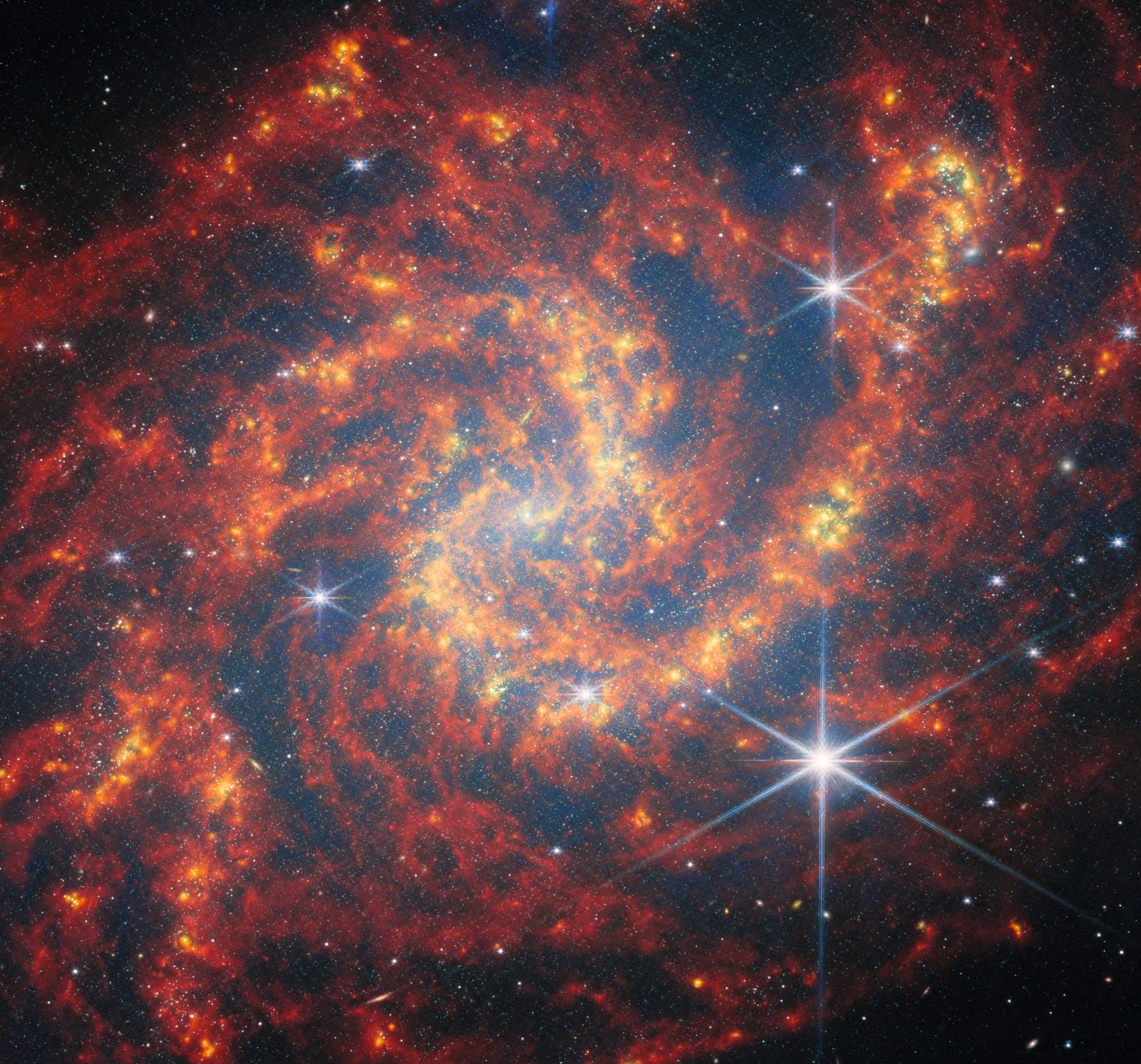
James Webb Space Telescope image of NGC 2283

== See also ==
- List of NGC objects (2001–3000)
