= Lambda Canis Majoris =

Star in the constellation Canis Majoris

- Location of λ Canis Majoris (circled in red)

Observation data Epoch J2000.0 Equinox J2000.0 (ICRS)
- Constellation: Canis Major
- Right ascension: 06^{h} 28^{m} 10.208^{s}
- Declination: −32° 34′ 48.25″
- Apparent magnitude (V): +4.48

Characteristics
- Spectral type: B4 V
- U−B color index: −0.61
- B−V color index: −0.17

Astrometry
Radial velocity (R_{v})	+41.0±4.1 km/s
Proper motion (μ)	RA: −13.777 mas/yr Dec.: +25.459 mas/yr
Parallax (π)	7.4077±0.1071 mas
Distance	440 ± 6 ly (135 ± 2 pc)
Absolute magnitude (M_{V})	−0.85

Details
Mass	4.98±0.05 M_{☉}
Radius	4.30±0.07 R_{☉}
Luminosity	824±22 L_{☉}
Surface gravity (log g)	3.87±0.01 cgs
Temperature	15,481±22 K
Rotational velocity (v sin i)	102±9 km/s
Age	39.8±19.1 Myr

Other designations
- λ CMa, CD−32°3066, GC 8410, HD 45813, HIP 30788, HR 2361, SAO 196857

Database references
SIMBAD	data

Lambda Canis Majoris is a solitary, blue-white hued star in the constellation Canis Major. Its name is a Bayer designation that is Latinized from λ Canis Majoris, and abbreviated Lambda CMa or λ CMa. This star is visible to the naked eye with an apparent visual magnitude of +4.48. Based upon an annual parallax shift of 7.41 mas as seen from Earth, it is located about 440 light-years (135 pc) away from the Sun. At that distance, the visual magnitude is diminished by an extinction of 0.14 due to interstellar dust. It is receding from the Sun with a line of sight velocity of +41 km/s.

This is a B-type main-sequence star with a stellar classification of B4 V. The star is roughly 40 million years old, and has a high rate of spin with a projected rotational velocity of 102 km/s. It has about 5 times the mass of the Sun and 4.3 times the Sun's radius. The star is radiating 824 times the Sun's luminosity at an effective temperature of 15,481 K.
