= Nu2 Canis Majoris =

Star in the constellation Canis Major

ν^{2} Canis Majoris
- Location of ν^{2} Canis Majoris (circled)

Observation data Epoch J2000.0 Equinox ICRS
- Constellation: Canis Major
- Right ascension: 06^{h} 36^{m} 41.038^{s}
- Declination: −19° 15′ 21.17″
- Apparent magnitude (V): 3.96

Characteristics
- Evolutionary stage: Red-giant branch
- Spectral type: K1 III

Astrometry
| Radial velocity (R_{v}) | +2.57±0.14 km/s |
| Proper motion (μ) | RA: +62.660 mas/yr Dec.: −69.816 mas/yr |
| Parallax (π) | 48.8490±0.1323 mas |
| Distance | 66.8 ± 0.2 ly (20.47 ± 0.06 pc) |
| Absolute magnitude (M_{V}) | 2.47 |

Details
| Mass | 1.439±0.047 M_{☉} |
| Radius | 5.198±0.060 R_{☉} |
| Luminosity | 13.2±0.7 L_{☉} |
| Surface gravity (log g) | 3.165±0.005 cgs |
| Temperature | 4,790±27 K |
| Metallicity [Fe/H] | 0.21±0.10 dex |
| Rotational velocity (v sin i) | 1.97±0.23 km/s |
| Age | 4.6±0.7 Gyr |

Other designations
- ν^{2} CMa, 7 CMa, BD−19°1502, FK5 2510, GC 8624, GJ 239.1, HD 47205, HIP 31592, HR 2429, SAO 151702

Database references
| SIMBAD | data |

Nu^{2} Canis Majoris is a star in the southern constellation of Canis Major. Its name is a Bayer designation that is Latinized from ν^{2} Canis Majoris, and abbreviated Nu^{2} CMa or ν^{2} CMa. With an apparent visual magnitude of 3.96, it is bright enough to be seen with the naked eye, close to Sirius. An annual parallax shift of around 50.63 mas, as measured by the Gaia spacecraft, implies a distance of 66.8 light-years (20.5 pc). It is drifting further away with a line of sight velocity of +2.6 km/s. The star has two confirmed exoplanets and no known stellar companion.

This is an aging giant star with a stellar classification of K1 III, having exhausted the hydrogen at its core then expanded. It is believed to be on the early ascent of the red giant branch and has not yet undergone helium flash. This star is around 4.6 billion years old and is spinning slowly with a projected rotational velocity of 2 km/s. It has 1.4 times the mass of the Sun and has grown to 5.2 times the Sun's radius. The star is radiating 13 the luminosity of the Sun from its photosphere at an effective temperature of 4,790 K.

== Planetary system ==
By measuring periodic variations in the radial velocity of the host star between 2009 and 2010, the Pan-Pacific Planet Search program was able to identify a planet orbiting Nu^{2} Canis Majoris. An orbital fit produced a minimum mass estimate of 2.6±0.6 M_{J} with an orbital period of 2.1 years and an eccentricity of 0.23. Star spots were ruled out as a source for the signal with a false-alarm probability of 98.7%. Further observations through 2019 detected the planet, as well as a secondary planet c in a 4:3 orbital resonance with planet b.

The Nu^{2} Canis Majoris planetary system (Note: Masses: Lin et al. (2024) Orbital periods: Luque et al. (2019) Semi-major axes: Lin et al. (2024) Eccentricities: Luque et al. (2019))
| Companion (in order from star) | Mass | Semimajor axis (AU) | Orbital period (days) | Eccentricity | Inclination (°) | Radius |
|---|---|---|---|---|---|---|
| b | ≥1.940±0.064 M_{J} | 1.800±0.033 | 736.9 | 0.055 | — | — |
| c | ≥0.912±0.067 M_{J} | 2.205±0.046 | 988.9 | 0.046 | — | — |

== Chinese name ==
In Chinese astronomy, ν^{2} Canis Majoris is called 野雞, Pinyin: Yějī, meaning Wild Cockerel, because this star is marking itself and stand alone in Wild Cockerel asterism, Well mansion (see : Chinese constellation). 野雞 (Yějī), westernized into Ya Ke. According to R. H. Allen, the name Ya Ke is an asterism consisting ο^{1} Canis Majoris and π Canis Majoris, with other small stars in the body of the Dog.
