= Xi1 Canis Majoris =

Star in the constellation Canis Major

ξ^{1} Canis Majoris
- Location of ξ^{1} Canis Majoris (circled)

Observation data Epoch J2000.0 Equinox ICRS
- Constellation: Canis Major
- Right ascension: 06^{h} 31^{m} 51.366^{s}
- Declination: −23° 25′ 06.32″
- Apparent magnitude (V): 4.33 to 4.36

Characteristics
- Evolutionary stage: main sequence
- Spectral type: B1III or B0.7IV
- U−B color index: −0.98
- B−V color index: −0.24
- Variable type: β Cep

Astrometry
Radial velocity (R_{v})	+26.9 km/s
Proper motion (μ)	RA: −3.352 mas/yr Dec.: +6.157 mas/yr
Parallax (π)	2.1660±0.1257 mas
Distance	1,510 ± 90 ly (460 ± 30 pc)
Absolute magnitude (M_{V})	−3.86

Details
Mass	14.2±0.4 M_{☉}
Radius	7.9±0.6 R_{☉}
Luminosity	30,900+8,900 −6,900 L_{☉}
Surface gravity (log g)	3.78±0.07 cgs
Temperature	27,000±1,000 K
Metallicity [Fe/H]	−0.18 dex
Rotational velocity (v sin i)	0 km/s
Age	11.1±0.7 Myr

Other designations
- ξ^{1} CMa, 4 Canis Majoris, CD−23°3991, GC 8496, HD 46328, HIP 31125, HR 2387, SAO 171895, ADS 5176, CCDM 06319-2325

Database references
SIMBAD	data

Xi^{1} Canis Majoris is a blue-white variable star in the constellation Canis Major. Its name is a Bayer designation that is Latinized from ξ^{1} Canis Majoris, and abbreviated Xi^{1} CMa or ξ^{1} CMa. This star is visible to the naked eye with an apparent visual magnitude of +4.3. Based on an annual parallax shift of 2.17 mas, it is located at a distance of approximately 1,510 light-years (460 pc) from Earth.

== Properties ==
The stellar classification of Xi^{1} Canis Majoris matches an early-type B-type star. It has generally been assigned a luminosity class of III (giant) or IV (subgiant), for example B1III or B0.5IV. Comparison of its properties with model evolutionary tracks suggest that it is a main sequence star about three quarters of the way through its main sequence lifetime. Its estimated age is 11 million years. This is a massive star with 14 times the mass of the Sun and 8 times the Sun's radius. It is radiating 30,900 times the luminosity of the Sun from its photosphere at an effective temperature of 27,000 K.

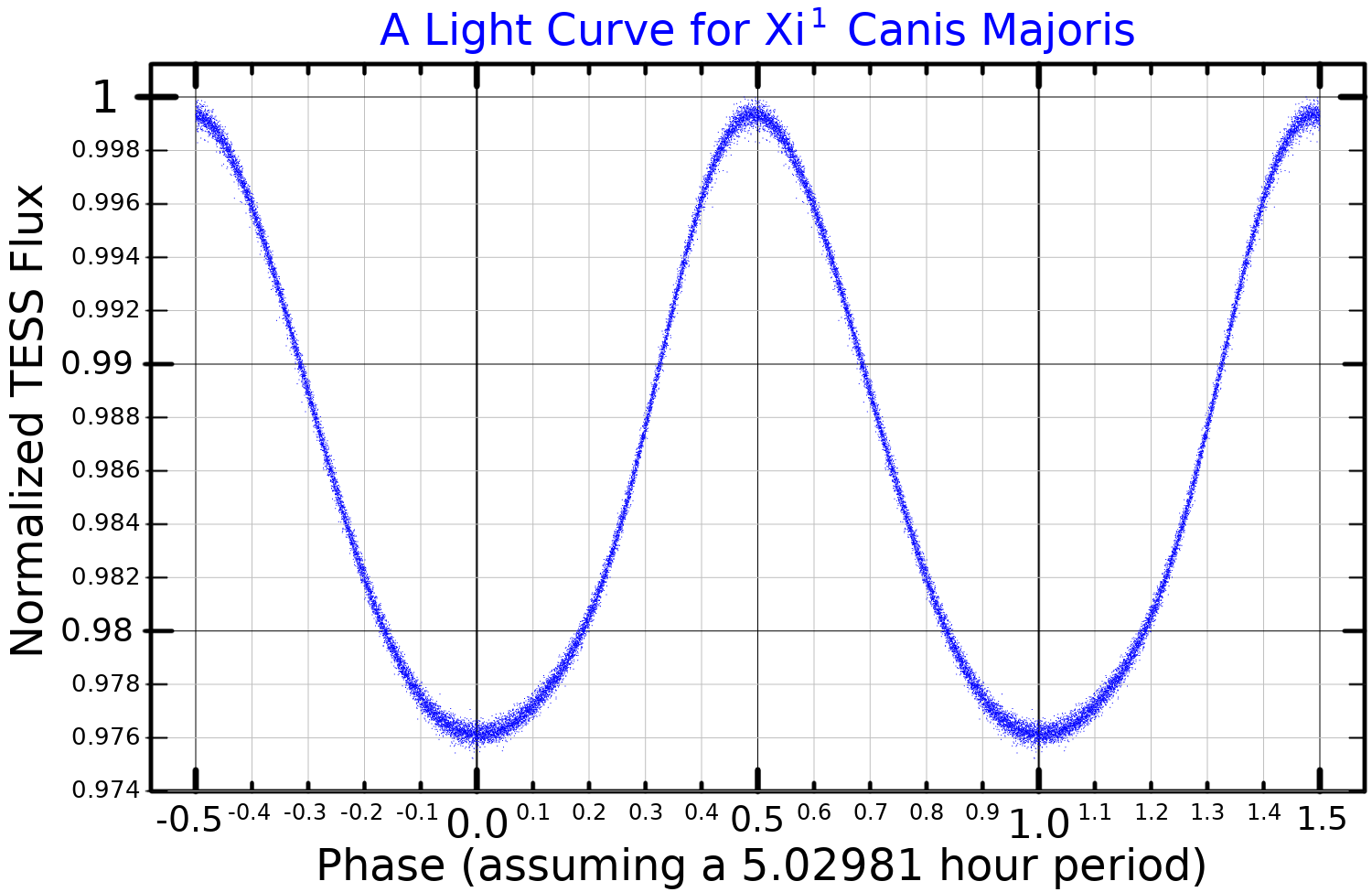
A light curve for Xi^{1} Canis Majoris, plotted from TESS data

ξ^{1} Canis Majoris is classified as a Beta (β) Cephei variable that ranges from magnitude +4.33 to +4.36 with a period of 5.03 hours. This period has remained very stable, changing by no more than one second per century. Its pulsations cause its radius to vary by 1.0% to 1.5%. At the same time its effective temperature varies by about 500 K above and below its mean temperature.

It has the longest known rotation period of any B class star, taking around 30 years to complete one revolution on its axis. This is thought to be due to magnetic braking; ξ^{1} Canis Majoris has the strongest magnetic field of any β Cephei star and would be expected to spin down completely in around four million years. It also has the strongest and hardest X-ray emission of any β Cephei star. The X-ray emission varies in phase with the optical pulsations. The stellar wind from ξ^{1} Canis Majoris is very weak with a terminal velocity of 700 km/s; the star is losing less than 10^{−10} M_{☉}·yr^{−1}.

This star forms a naked eye pairing with ξ^{2} Canis Majoris a little less than a degree away. The Washington Double Star Catalog lists two 14th magnitude companions at an angular separation of about 27″. In addition, an unseen close companion is suspected due to some faint emission lines in the spectrum that are best explained by a Be star that is invisible against the brighter primary.
