= W Canis Majoris =

Star in the constellation Canis Major

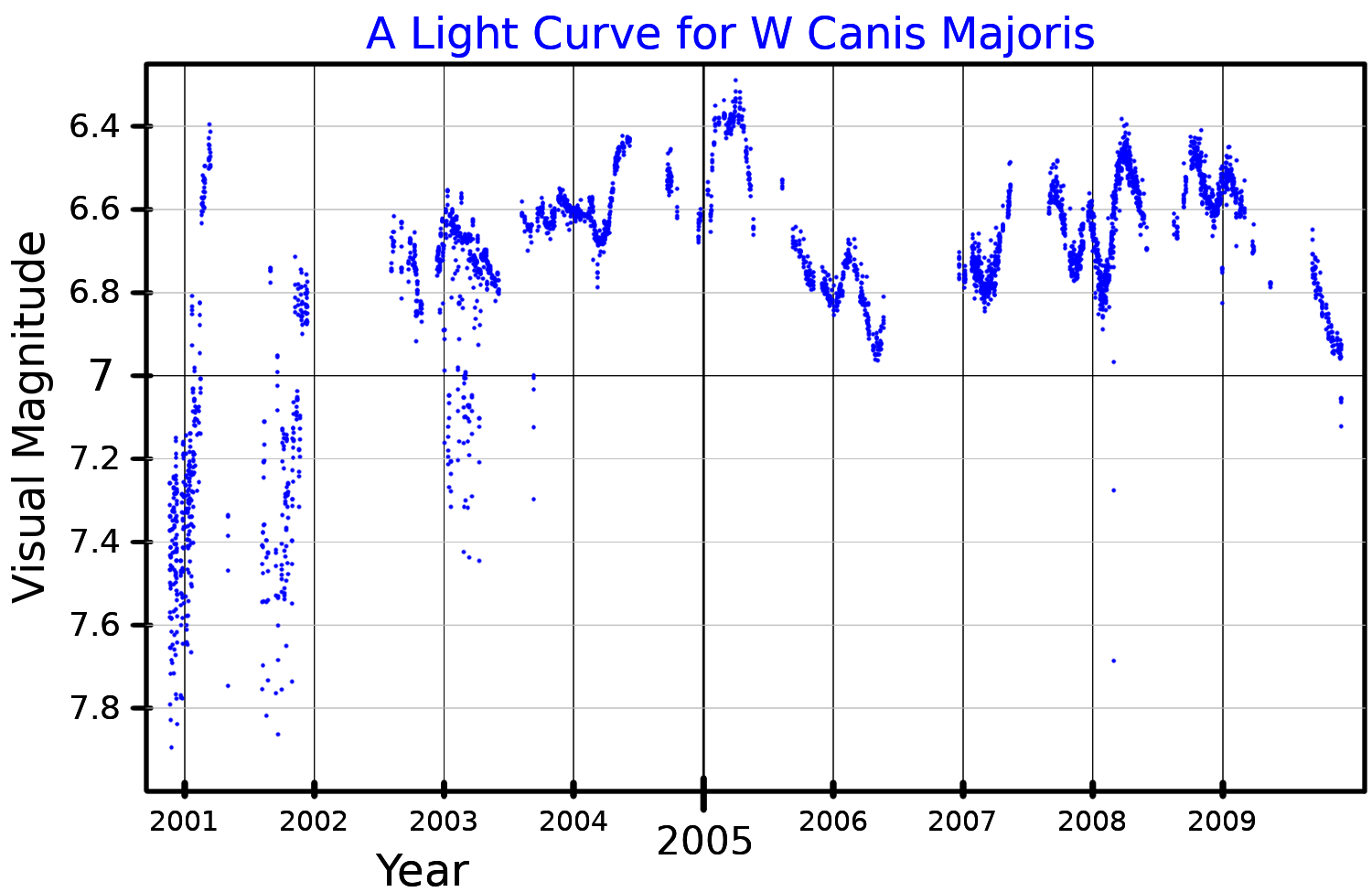
- A visual band light curve for W Canis Majoris, plotted from All Sky Automated Survey data.

Observation data Epoch J2000.0 Equinox J2000.0 (ICRS)
- Constellation: Canis Major
- Right ascension: 07^{h} 08^{m} 03.43652^{s}
- Declination: −11° 55′ 23.7977″
- Apparent magnitude (V): 6.35–7.90

Characteristics
- Evolutionary stage: AGB
- Spectral type: C6,3(N)
- B−V color index: +2.55
- Variable type: Lb

Astrometry
Radial velocity (R_{v})	23.00 km/s
Proper motion (μ)	RA: −6.518 mas/yr Dec.: 2.280 mas/yr
Parallax (π)	1.8049±0.1454 mas
Distance	1,800 ± 100 ly (550 ± 40 pc)

Details
Radius	234 R_{☉}
Luminosity	2,900 L_{☉}
Surface gravity (log g)	0.0 cgs
Temperature	2,900 K

Other designations
- W CMa, BD−11°1805, HIP 34413, HD 54361, SAO 152427

Database references
SIMBAD	data

W Canis Majoris (W CMa) is a carbon star in the constellation Canis Major. A cool star, it has a surface temperature of around 2,900 K and a radius 234 times that of the Sun, with a bolometric absolute magnitude of −4.13 and distance estimated at 443 or 445 parsecs (1,444–1,450 light-years) based on bolometric magnitude or radius. The Gaia Data Release 2 parallax of 1.8049±0.1454 milliarcseconds implies a distance of about 555 parsecs. It is a variable star, whose brightness ranges from magnitude 6.35 to 7.90. At its brightest, it might be very faintly visible to the naked eye of an observer with ideal observing conditions.

== Variability ==
In 1901, it was announced that Williamina Fleming had discovered the star, then called BD −11° 1805, is a variable star. It was given its variable star designation, W Canis Majoris, in 1912. W CMa is classified as a slow irregular variable star. Detailed analyses have found only very weak and probably spurious periods of approximately a month. It is a carbon star, an asymptotic giant branch star where carbon and s-process elements have been dredged up to the surface during thermal pulses of the helium-burning shell.
