= RX J0720.4−3125 =

Neutron star in the constellation Canis Major

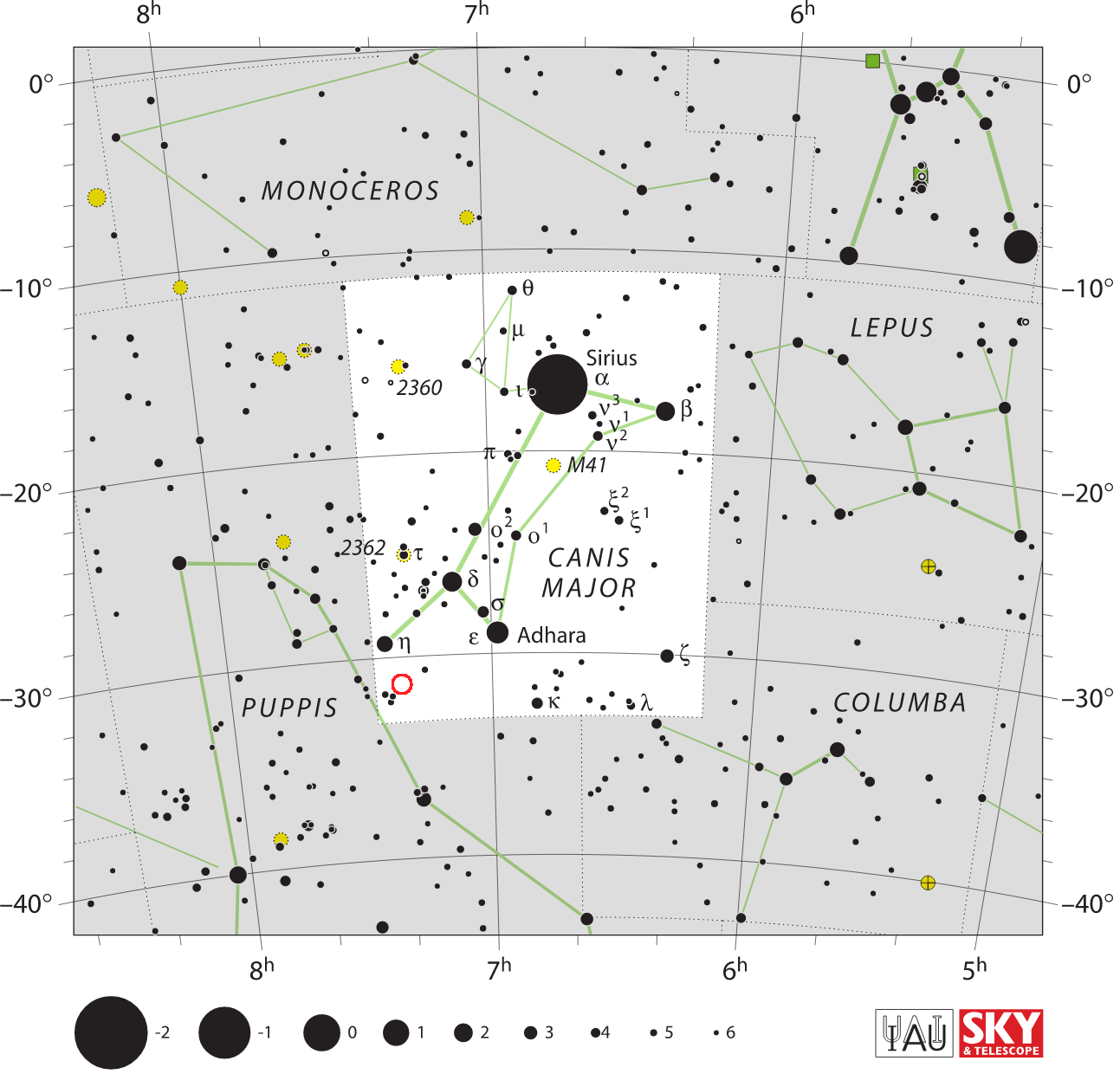
- The location of RX J0720.4-3125 (circled in red)

Observation data Epoch 1996.7 Equinox J2000.0
- Constellation: Canis Major
- Right ascension: 07^{h} 20^{m} 24.961^{s}
- Declination: −31° 25′ 50.21″
- Apparent magnitude (V): ~26.6

Details
Radius	4.50+0.08 −0.09 – 5.38+0.13 −0.14 km

Other designations
- RX J0720.4−3125, 1ES 0718−31.3

Database references
SIMBAD	data

RX J0720.4−3125 is a neutron star in the constellation Canis Major. It was discovered in 1997 in the ROSAT All-sky survey. Measurement of its parallax leads to an estimate of around 360 parsecs (1,200 light-years) for its distance from Earth. It is a member of the Magnificent Seven, a group of neutron stars that are relatively near to the Solar System. RX J0720.4–3125 has a radius of around 5 km. Its spectrum and temperature appear to be mysteriously changing over several years. The nature of the changes are unclear, but it is possible there was an event such as the star's absorption of an accretion disc.
