= 12 Canis Majoris =

Variable star in the constellation Canis Major

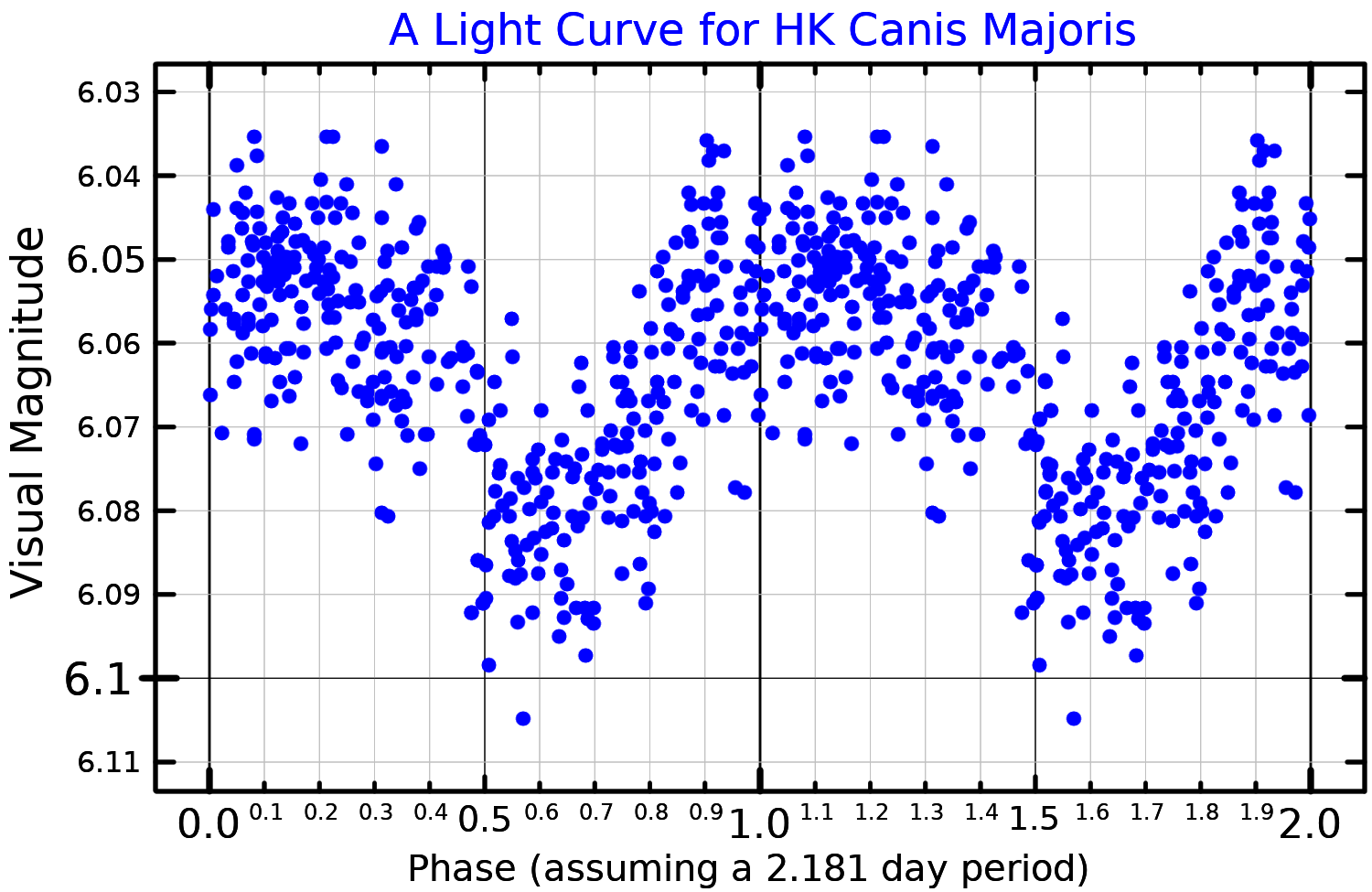
- A visual band light curve for HK Canis Majoris (2020)

Observation data Epoch J2000 Equinox J2000
- Constellation: Canis Major
- Right ascension: 06^{h} 47^{m} 01.48353^{s}
- Declination: −21° 00′ 55.4517″
- Apparent magnitude (V): +6.07

Characteristics
- Spectral type: B7 II/III or B5 V
- B−V color index: −0.159±0.004
- Variable type: SX Ari

Astrometry
Radial velocity (R_{v})	+16.4±2.5 km/s
Proper motion (μ)	RA: −14.568 mas/yr Dec.: +5.778 mas/yr
Parallax (π)	4.6155±0.0543 mas
Distance	707 ± 8 ly (217 ± 3 pc)
Absolute magnitude (M_{V})	−0.81

Details
Mass	4.8 M_{☉}
Radius	2.73 R_{☉}
Luminosity	537 L_{☉}
Surface gravity (log g)	4.23 cgs
Temperature	15,830±60 K
Metallicity [Fe/H]	−0.37 dex
Rotation	2.18045 d
Rotational velocity (v sin i)	65 km/s
Age	134 Myr

Other designations
- 12 CMa, HK CMa, BD−20°1576, FK5 817, GC 8884, HD 49333, HIP 32504, HR 2509, SAO 172318

Database references
SIMBAD	data

12 Canis Majoris is a variable star located about 707 light years away from the Sun in the southern constellation of Canis Major. It has the variable star designation HK Canis Majoris; 12 Canis Majoris is the Flamsteed designation. This body is just barely visible to the naked eye as a dim, blue-white hued star with a baseline apparent visual magnitude of +6.07. It is moving away from the Earth with a heliocentric radial velocity of +16 km/s. This is the brightest star in the vicinity of the open cluster NGC 2287, although it is probably not a member based on its proper motion.

The Bayer designation ρ Canis Majoris/Rho Canis Majoris has been applied to this star in the past, but this is now rarely seen. Perhaps the best-known use was by Charles Messier when describing the cluster Messier 41: "cluster of stars below Sirius, near Rho Canis Majoris".

This star has a stellar classification of B7 II/III, matching the spectrum of a B-type star intermediate between a giant and bright giant. (Cidale et al. (2007) show a class of B5 V, which would indicate it is instead a B-type main-sequence star.) It is a magnetic Bp star of the helium–weak variety (CP4), with the spectrum displaying evidence for vertical stratification of helium in the atmosphere.

Holger Pedersen and Bjarne Thomsen discovered that 12 Canis Majoris is a variable star, in 1977. It was given its variable star designation in 1981. Samus et al. (2017) classify it as an SX Arietis variable that varies in brightness by about 0.05 magnitudes over a period of 2.18045 days. It has 4.8 times the mass of the Sun and 2.73 times the Sun's radius. The star is radiating 537 times the Sun's luminosity from its photosphere at an effective temperature of 15,830 K.
