= 10 Canis Majoris =

Star in the constellation Canis Major

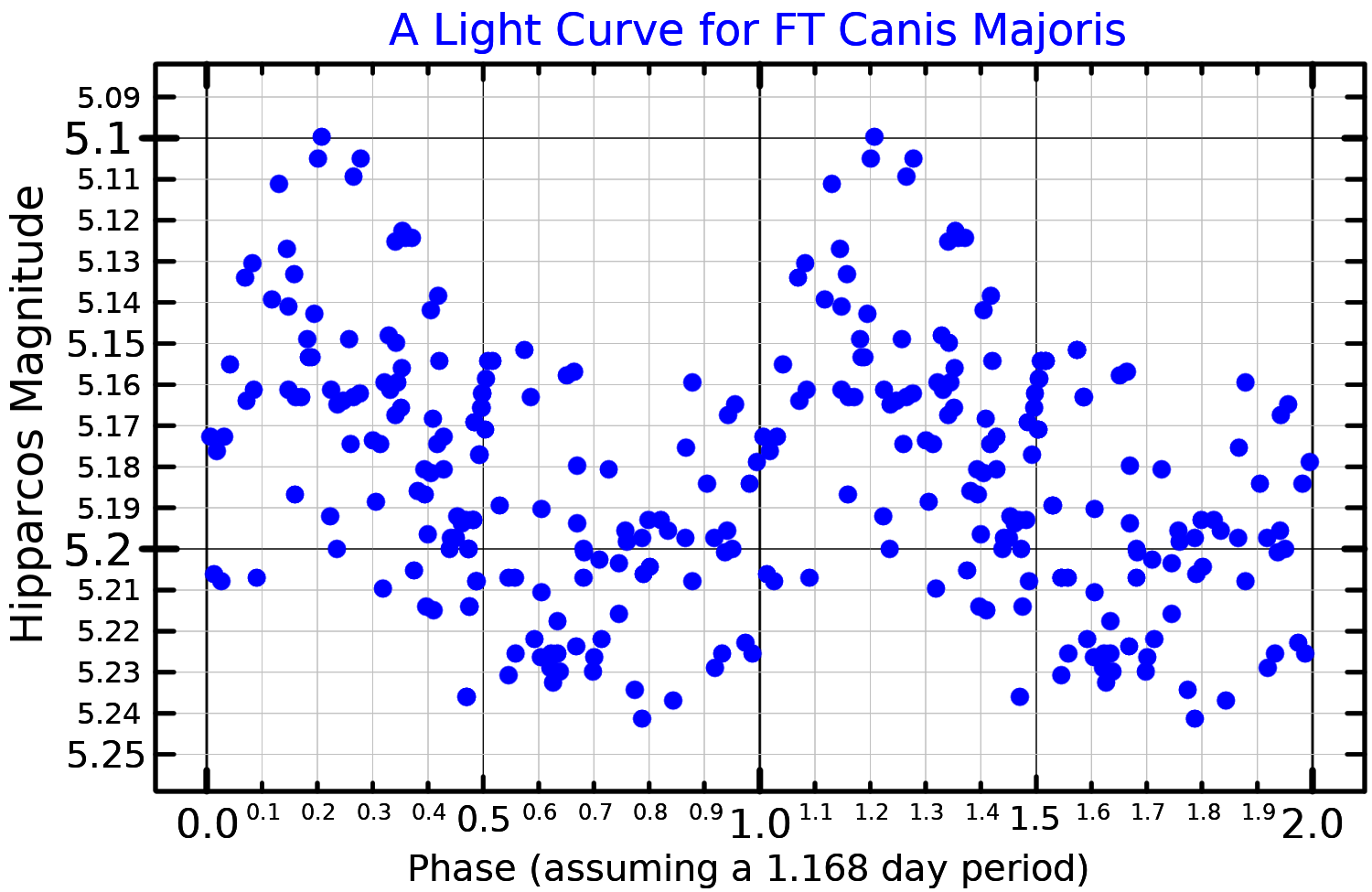
- A light curve for FT Canis Majoris from Hipparcos data, adapted from Lefèvre et al. (2009)

Observation data Epoch J2000 Equinox J2000
- Constellation: Canis Major
- Right ascension: 06^{h} 44^{m} 28.46710^{s}
- Declination: −31° 04′ 13.8923″
- Apparent magnitude (V): 5.13–5.44

Characteristics
- Spectral type: B2 V or B2 IIIe
- B−V color index: −0.127±0.005
- Variable type: Be

Astrometry
Radial velocity (R_{v})	+34.0±4.2 km/s
Proper motion (μ)	RA: −3.286 mas/yr Dec.: +4.201 mas/yr
Parallax (π)	1.6454±0.0722 mas
Distance	1,980 ± 90 ly (610 ± 30 pc)

Details
Mass	19.2±0.1 M_{☉}
Radius	10.0 R_{☉}
Luminosity	44,463+35,336 −19,689 L_{☉}
Surface gravity (log g)	3.76±0.17 cgs
Temperature	25,350±1,030 K
Rotation	2.63 d
Rotational velocity (v sin i)	205±5 km/s
Age	8.2±0.1 Myr

Other designations
- 10 CMa, FT Canis Majoris, CD−30°3484, GC 8827, HD 48917, HIP 32292, HR 2492, SAO 197149, CCDM 06445-3104, WDS J06445-3104

Database references
SIMBAD	data

10 Canis Majoris is a single variable star in the southern constellation of Canis Major, located roughly 1,980 light years away from the Sun. It has the variable star designation FT Canis Majoris; 10 Canis Majoris is the Flamsteed designation. This body is visible to the naked eye as a faint, 5th-magnitude blue-white hued star. It is moving away from the Earth with a heliocentric radial velocity of +34 km/s.

This is a massive Be star with a stellar classification of B2 V, matching a B-type main-sequence star. Hiltner et al. (1969) found a giant class of B2 IIIe, which is still in use with some studies. The star is spinning rapidly with a projected rotational velocity of 205 km/s and a rotational period of 2.63 days. This is giving it an oblate shape with an equatorial bulge that is 5% larger than the polar radius. The axis of rotation is inclined by an angle of 45° to the line of sight from the Earth.

In 1968, Alejandro Feinstein announced that the star is variable, based on observations from 1963-1965. It was given its variable star designation in 1973. Samus et al. (2017) classify it as a Be-type variable star that ranges from a peak visual magnitude of 5.13 down to 5.44 with a rotationally-modulated period of 2.63 days.

10 Canis Majoris is 8.2 million years old with 19.2 times the mass of the Sun and 10 times the Sun's radius. It is radiating around 44,000 times the luminosity of the Sun from its photosphere at an effective temperature of 25,000 K. There is a magnitude 12.58 visual companion at an angular separation of 37.3″ along a position angle of 99°, as of 2015.
