= Iota Canis Majoris =

Variable star in the constellation Canis Major

ι Canis Majoris
- Location of ι Canis Majoris (circled)

Observation data Epoch J2000 Equinox ICRS
- Constellation: Canis Major
- Right ascension: 06^{h} 56^{m} 08.2246^{s}
- Declination: −17° 03′ 15.259″
- Apparent magnitude (V): 4.40 (4.36 to 4.40)

Characteristics
- Evolutionary stage: Supergiant
- Spectral type: B3 Ib or B3 Ib/II
- U−B color index: −0.74
- B−V color index: −0.07

Astrometry
Radial velocity (R_{v})	41.75±0.43 km/s
Proper motion (μ)	RA: −3.547 mas/yr Dec.: 3.190 mas/yr
Parallax (π)	0.9453±0.1857 mas
Distance	3,100±130 ly (950±40 pc)
Absolute magnitude (M_{V})	−5.51

Details
Mass	13.7±0.5 M_{☉}
Radius	32±4 R_{☉}
Luminosity	52,480 L_{☉}
Surface gravity (log g)	2.59±0.05 cgs
Temperature	15,600±400 K
Metallicity [Fe/H]	−0.17 dex
Rotational velocity (v sin i)	30±6 km/s
Age	14.79+1.43 −1.30 Myr

Other designations
- ι CMa, 20 Canis Majoris, BD−16°1661, FK5 2536, GC 9107, HD 51309, HIP 33347, HR 2596, SAO 152126

Database references
SIMBAD	data

Iota Canis Majoris is a solitary supergiant star in the southern constellation of Canis Major. Its name is a Bayer designation that is Latinized from ι Canis Majoris, and abbreviated Iota CMa or ι CMa. This is a variable star that ranges in apparent visual magnitude from +4.36 to +4.40, which is faintly visible to the naked eye. The distance to this star is approximately 3,100 light years based on spectroscopic measurements. It is drifting further away from the Sun with a radial velocity of +42 km/s.

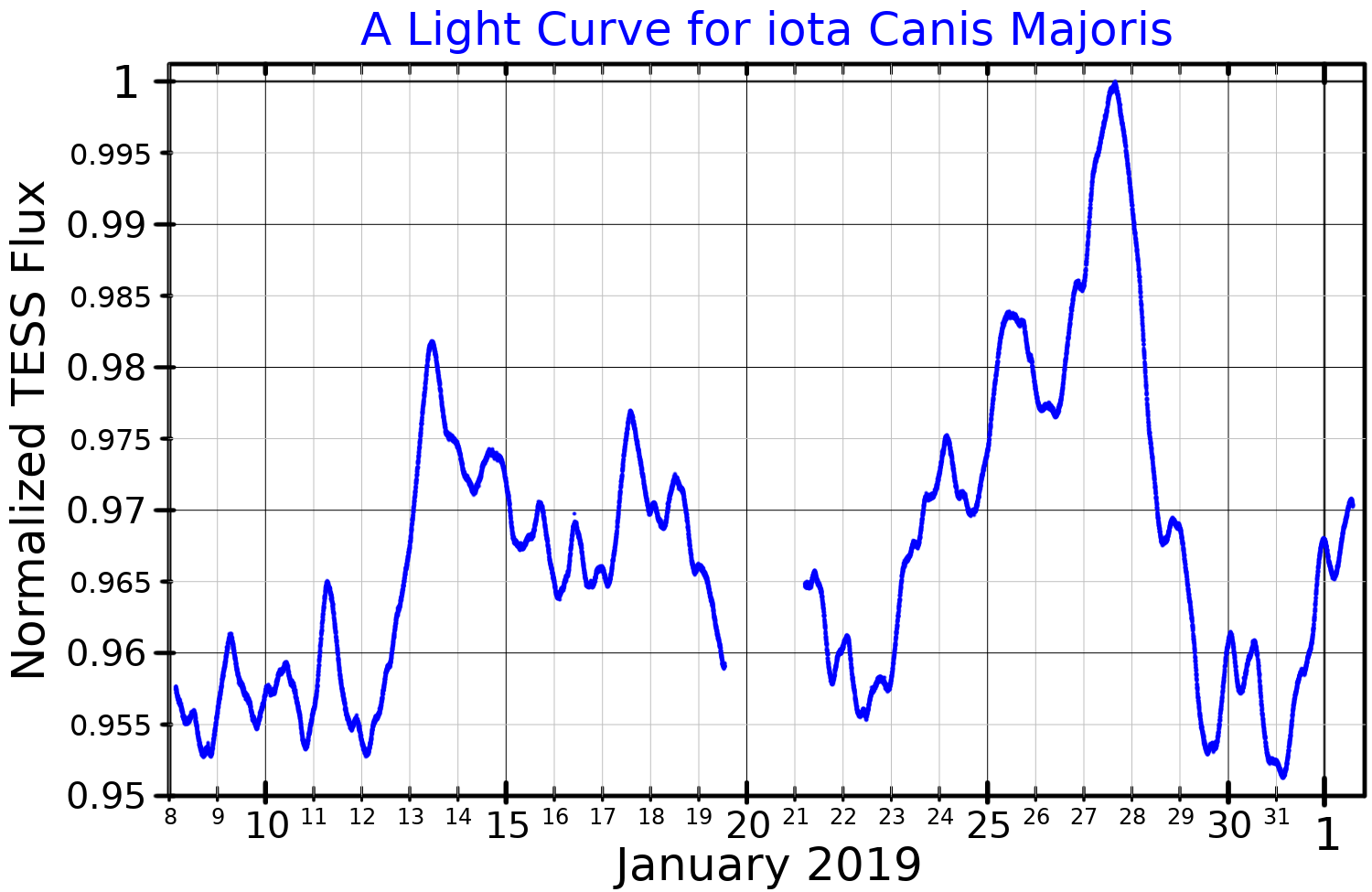
A light curve for Iota Canis Majoris, plotted from TESS data.

Iota Canis Majoris is a massive blue-white B-type supergiant with a stellar classification of B3 Ib. It has been classified as a Beta Cephei type variable star, but the supergiant spectral type and a period of over a day mean it is no longer considered to be of that type. This star is 15 million years old and is spinning with a projected rotational velocity of 30 km/s. It has 14 times the mass and 32 times the radius of the Sun. Iota Canis Majoris is radiating 52,000 times the luminosity of the Sun from its photosphere at an effective temperature of 15,600 K.

The star displays a bow shock feature from its interaction with the interstellar medium, but this nebulosity is not aligned with the star's motion through the galaxy.
