= Z Canis Majoris =

Star in the constellation Canis Major

- Image of Z Canis Majoris, the star with a dust trail at the center of the image

Observation data Epoch J2000.0 Equinox J2000.0 (ICRS)
- Constellation: Canis Major
- Right ascension: 07^{h} 03^{m} 43.15994^{s}
- Declination: −11° 33′ 06.2091″
- Apparent magnitude (V): 7.8 - 11.2

Characteristics
- Spectral type: B5/8eq+F5/7
- B−V color index: 1.19
- Variable type: INA

Astrometry
Radial velocity (R_{v})	−27±10 km/s
Proper motion (μ)	RA: −4.839 mas/yr Dec.: +3.831 mas/yr
Parallax (π)	2.0354±0.6322 mas
Distance	3,670±100 ly (1,125±30 pc)

Orbit
Period (P)	950+218 −256 years
Semi-major axis (a)	245.6+35.7 −42.9 au
Eccentricity (e)	0.172+0.058 −0.057
Longitude of the node (Ω)	200.1+1.7 −1.8°
Argument of periastron (ω) (secondary)	142.1+9.2 −30.6°

Details

SE (FU Ori)
Mass	<2 M_{☉}
Radius	13 R_{☉}
Luminosity	1,300 L_{☉}
Temperature	10,000 K
Age	0.3 Myr

NW (Herbig Ae/Be)
Mass	12–16 M_{☉}
Radius	23±9 R_{☉}
Luminosity	2,200±1,700 L_{☉}
Temperature	8,250±183 K
Age	0.06±0.03 Myr

Other designations
- Z CMa, BD−11 1760, HD 53179, HIP 34042, PPM 218073, SAO 152302

Database references
SIMBAD	data

Z Canis Majoris (Z CMa) is a B-type star in the constellation of Canis Major. It has an average apparent visual magnitude of approximately 10, though has brightened by 1-2 magnitudes in irregular outbursts in 1987, 2000, 2004 and 2008.

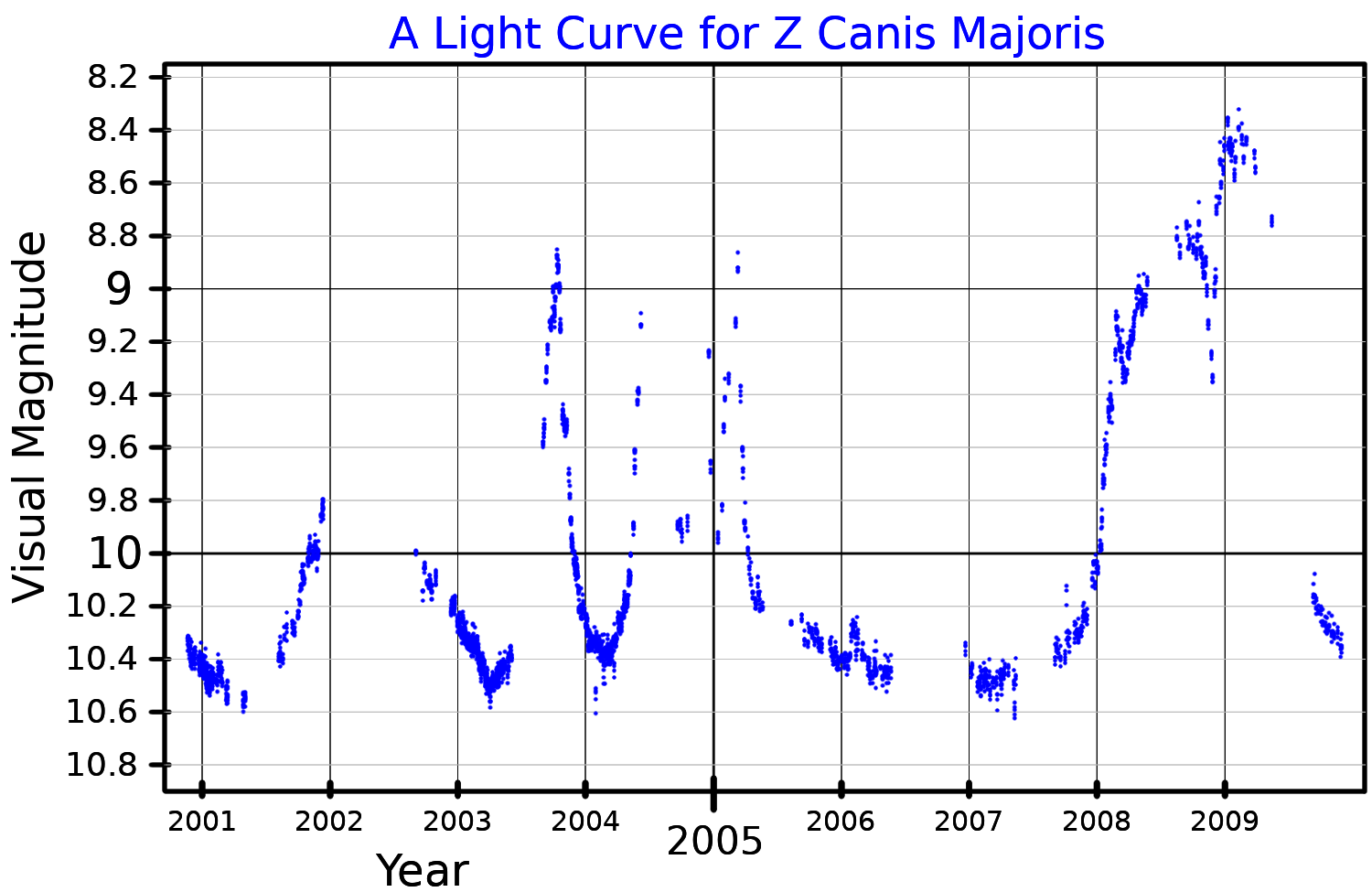
A visual band light curve for Z Canis Majoris, plotted from All Sky Automated Survey data

Arville D. Walker of the Harvard College Observatory discovered that the star is a variable star, from the examination of 275 photographs taken between 1899 and 1921. Her discovery was announced in 1921, and the star received its variable star designation, Z Canis Majoris, in 1922.

The star is a complex binary system only 300,000 years old with two main components separated by about 250 astronomical units (AU). The southeast component is an FU Orionis star (a type of pre-main-sequence star in a phase of very high mass accretion resulting in an accretion disk which dominates the optical spectrum) that is 1,300 times as luminous as the Sun, has 3 times its mass and 13 times its diameter and a surface temperature of 10,000 K. The northwest component is a Herbig Ae/Be star that has been calculated to be 12 times as massive as the Sun with a dust shell photosphere 1,690±30 times its diameter and a blackbody temperature of 980 K, the star shines with a luminosity 2,400 times greater than that of the sun, though there is some uncertainty about its properties. It is enveloped in an irregular roughly spherical cocoon of dust that has an inner diameter of 20 and outer diameter of 50 AU. The cocoon has a hole in it through which light shines that covers an angle of 5 to 10 degrees of its circumference. Both stars are surrounded by a large envelope of in-falling material that left over from the original cloud that formed the system. Both stars are emitting jets of material, that of the Herbig Ae/Be star being much larger - up to 11.7 light-years (3.6 parsecs) long.

It is unclear whether the most recent (and brightest) brightening in 2008 was due to the Herbig Ae/Be star increasing in luminosity or a hole appearing in the cocoon.
