= Pi Canis Majoris =

Binary star system in the constellation Canis Major

- Location of π Canis Majoris (circled in red)

Observation data Epoch J2000.0 Equinox J2000.0 (ICRS)
- Constellation: Canis Major
- Right ascension: 06^{h} 55^{m} 37.430^{s}
- Declination: −20° 08′ 11.39″
- Apparent magnitude (V): +4.69

Characteristics
- Evolutionary stage: main sequence
- Spectral type: F1.5 V
- U−B color index: +0.06
- B−V color index: +0.36

Astrometry
Radial velocity (R_{v})	−37.9±5.5 km/s
Proper motion (μ)	RA: +51.109 mas/yr Dec.: +39.971 mas/yr
Parallax (π)	33.5731±0.0952 mas
Distance	97.1 ± 0.3 ly (29.79 ± 0.08 pc)
Absolute magnitude (M_{V})	+2.06

Details

π CMa A
Mass	1.62±0.04 M_{☉}
Radius	2.29±0.05 R_{☉}
Luminosity	9.83^{+0.06}_{−0.08} L_{☉}
Surface gravity (log g)	3.84^{+0.01}_{−0.03} cgs
Temperature	6,747±4 K
Metallicity [Fe/H]	−0.18 dex
Rotational velocity (v sin i)	91.7±4.6 km/s
Age	0.763; 1.64^{+0.04}_{−0.06} Gyr

Other designations
- π CMa, 19 Canis Majoris, BD−19°1610, HD 51199, HIP 33302, HR 2590, SAO 172579, ADS 5602, CCDM 06556-2008

Database references
SIMBAD	data

Pi Canis Majoris is a binary star system in the southern constellation of Canis Major, the 'Greater Dog'. Its name is a Bayer designation that is Latinized from π Canis Majoris, and abbreviated Pi CMa or π CMa. This star is visible to the naked eye, having an apparent visual magnitude of +4.69. Based upon an annual parallax shift of 33.57 mas as seen from Earth, this system is located 97 light-years (30 pc) away from the Sun. It is moving in the general direction of the Sun with a radial velocity of −37.9 km/s. This system will make its closest approach in around 733,000 years when it comes within 23 ly (7 pc).

The brighter primary, component A, is an F-type main-sequence star with a stellar classification of F1.5 V. It is a periodic variable star with a frequency of 11.09569 cycles per day (2.16 hours per cycle) and an amplitude of 0.0025 in magnitude. Based on a stellar model, the star has an estimated 1.6 times the mass of the Sun and 2.3 times the Sun's radius. It is radiating 9.8 times the Sun's luminosity from its photosphere at an effective temperature of around 6,747 K. At an estimated age of around a billion years, it has a high rate of spin with a projected rotational velocity of 92 km/s. The star displays a strong infrared excess at a wavelength of 24 μm and a weaker excess at 70 μm, indicating the presence of a circumstellar disk of dust with an average temperature of 188 K, orbiting at a mean distance of 6.7 AU from the host star.

The magnitude 9.6 companion, component B, lies at an angular separation of 11.6 arc seconds from the primary as of 2008. Their projected separation is about 339 AU.

== In popular culture ==
This star is the origin of the alien crystal, and the destination of starship Salvare, on Netflix show Another Life.
