= Nu3 Canis Majoris =

Star in the constellation Canis Major

Nu^{3} Canis Majoris
- Location of ν^{3} Canis Majoris (circled in red)

Observation data Epoch J2000.0 Equinox J2000.0 (ICRS)
- Constellation: Canis Major
- Right ascension: 06^{h} 37^{m} 53.421^{s}
- Declination: −18° 14′ 14.93″
- Apparent magnitude (V): 4.41 (4.63 + 8.56)

Characteristics
- Evolutionary stage: horizontal branch
- Spectral type: K0 II-III
- U−B color index: +1.04
- B−V color index: +1.16

Astrometry
| Radial velocity (R_{v}) | −1.50±0.70 km/s |
| Proper motion (μ) | RA: −7.166 mas/yr Dec.: −8.777 mas/yr |
| Parallax (π) | 6.7876±0.1054 mas |
| Distance | 481 ± 7 ly (147 ± 2 pc) |
| Absolute magnitude (M_{V}) | −1.13 |

Details

ν^{3} CMa A
| Mass | 3.38±0.37 M_{☉} |
| Radius | 32.7 R_{☉} |
| Luminosity | 398 L_{☉} |
| Surface gravity (log g) | 2.34 cgs |
| Temperature | 4,510 K |
| Metallicity [Fe/H] | −0.24 dex |
| Rotation | 183 d |
| Rotational velocity (v sin i) | 8 km/s |
| Age | 380±20 Myr |

Other designations
- HDS 915, ν^{3} CMa, 8 Canis Majoris, BD−18°1492, GC 8660, HD 47442, HIP 31700, HR 2443, SAO 151730, CCDM 06379-1814, WDS J06379-1814A

Database references
| SIMBAD | data |

Nu^{3} Canis Majoris is a binary star system in the southern constellation of Canis Major. Its name is a Bayer designation that is Latinized from ν^{3} Canis Majoris, and abbreviated Nu^{3} CMa or ν^{3} CMa. The star system, appearing as one star, is deemed visible to the naked eye with its combined apparent visual magnitude of 4.41. Based upon an annual parallax shift of 6.79 mas as seen from Earth, this system is approximately 481 light-years (147 pc) distant from the Sun.

== Characteristics ==
The primary member, component A, is an evolved, orange-hued giant/bright giant hybrid with an apparent magnitude of +4.63 and a stellar classification of K0 II-III. It is most likely (96% chance) on the horizontal branch, which would indicate it is generated energy through helium fusion at its core. The star has a moderate level of surface activity with a magnetic field strength of 2.2±0.4 G and is a source of X-ray emission with a luminosity of 624×10^{27} erg s^{−1}.

This giant has an estimated 3.4 times the mass of the Sun and has expanded to 33 times the Sun's radius. It is radiating 398 times the Sun's luminosity from its enlarged photosphere at an effective temperature of 4,510 K. The star is spinning with the leisurely period of 183 days. Its companion, component B has been observed at 1.040 arcseconds distant along a position angle of 2.9° as of 2002, and has an apparent magnitude of +8.56.
