= Theta Canis Majoris =

Star in the constellation Canis Major

- Location of θ Canis Majoris (circled)

Observation data Epoch J2000.0 Equinox J2000.0 (ICRS)
- Constellation: Canis Major
- Right ascension: 06^{h} 54^{m} 11.399^{s}
- Declination: −12° 02′ 19.06″
- Apparent magnitude (V): 4.08

Characteristics
- Evolutionary stage: Red giant branch
- Spectral type: K4 III
- U−B color index: +1.69
- B−V color index: +1.43

Astrometry
Radial velocity (R_{v})	+96.2±0.1 km/s
Proper motion (μ)	RA: −136.454 mas/yr Dec.: −14.322 mas/yr
Parallax (π)	12.0676±0.62 mas
Distance	270 ± 10 ly (83 ± 4 pc)
Absolute magnitude (M_{V})	−0.36±0.15

Details
Mass	0.95±0.03 M_{☉}
Radius	33.01±0.75 R_{☉}
Luminosity	304.9±7 L_{☉}
Surface gravity (log g)	1.67±0.08 cgs
Temperature	4,196±43 K
Metallicity [Fe/H]	−0.52±0.04 dex
Rotational velocity (v sin i)	2.72±0.40 km/s
Age	10.41±1.31 Gyr

Other designations
- θ CMa, 14 Canis Majoris, BD−11°1681, FK5 266, GC 9051, HD 50778, HIP 33160, HR 2574, SAO 152071

Database references
SIMBAD	data

Theta Canis Majoris is a solitary, red-hued star near the northern edge of the constellation Canis Major, forming the nose of the "dog". Its name is a Bayer designation that is Latinized from θ Canis Majoris, and abbreviated Theta CMa or θ CMa. The star is visible to the naked eye with an apparent visual magnitude of 4.08. Based upon an annual parallax shift of 12.07 mas as seen from Earth, it is located about 270 light years distant. The star is moving away from the Sun with a radial velocity of +96.2 km/s.

This is a evolved K-type giant star with a stellar classification of K4 III, having exhausted the supply of hydrogen at its core then expanded. Theta Canis Majoris is 5% less massive than the Sun, but has grown to 33 times the Sun's girth. This star is around ten billion years old, over twice the age of the Solar System. It radiates 305 times the Sun's luminosity from its expanded photosphere at an effective temperature of 4,200 K. This temperature gives it the cool orange hue of a K-type star.
