= Nu1 Canis Majoris =

Binary star system in the constellation Canis Major

Nu^{1} Canis Majoris
- Location of ν^{1} Canis Majoris (circled in red)

Observation data Epoch J2000.0 Equinox J2000.0 (ICRS)
- Constellation: Canis Major
- Right ascension: 06^{h} 36^{m} 22.848^{s}
- Declination: −18° 39′ 35.73″
- Apparent magnitude (V): 5.704 (5.87 + 7.61)

Characteristics
- Spectral type: G8 III + F3 IV-V
- B−V color index: +0.815

Astrometry
Radial velocity (R_{v})	+26.13 km/s
Proper motion (μ)	RA: −9.902 mas/yr Dec.: +23.229 mas/yr
Parallax (π)	12.3660±0.1985 mas
Distance	264 ± 4 ly (81 ± 1 pc)
Absolute magnitude (M_{V})	+1.23

Details

ν^{1} CMa A
Mass	1.41 M_{☉}
Radius	7.1±0.3 R_{☉}
Luminosity	8 L_{☉}
Surface gravity (log g)	3.00 cgs
Temperature	6,091±822 K
Metallicity [Fe/H]	−0.06 dex
Rotational velocity (v sin i)	4.8±0.2 km/s
Age	3.07 Gyr

Other designations
- ν^{1} CMa, 6 Canis Majoris, BD−18°1480, GC 8614, HD 47138, HIP 31564, HR 2423, SAO 151694, ADS 5253, CCDM 06364-1840, WDS 06364-1840

Database references
SIMBAD	data

Nu^{1} Canis Majoris is a binary star in the constellation Canis Major. Its name is a Bayer designation that is Latinized from ν^{1} Canis Majoris, and abbreviated Nu^{1} CMa or ν^{1} CMa. This system is visible to the naked eye as a point of light with an apparent visual magnitude of 5.7. Based on parallax shift of 12.366 mas as seen from Earth orbit, this system is approximately 264 light years from the Sun. It is drifting further away with a line of sight velocity of +26 km/s.

As of 2011, the pair had an angular separation of 17.29 arc seconds along a position angle of 264.2°. The yellow hued magnitude 5.87 primary, component A, is an evolved G-type giant star with a stellar classification of G8 III. It is an estimated 3 billion years old and has 1.4 times the mass of the Sun. Having exhausted the supply of hydrogen at its core, it has expanded to 7 times the Sun's radius and is radiating 8 times the luminosity of the Sun from its photosphere at an effective temperature of 6,091 K.

The magnitude 7.61 companion, component B, is a yellow-white hued F-type main sequence/subgiant hybrid with a class of F3 IV-V.
