= Gamma Canis Majoris =

Star in the constellation Canis Major

γ Canis Majoris
- Location of γ Canis Majoris (circled)

Observation data Epoch J2000.0 Equinox ICRS
- Constellation: Canis Major
- Right ascension: 07^{h} 03^{m} 45.493^{s}
- Declination: −15° 37′ 59.83″
- Apparent magnitude (V): +4.10

Characteristics
- Evolutionary stage: main sequence
- Spectral type: B8II
- U−B color index: −0.45
- B−V color index: −0.13

Astrometry
Radial velocity (R_{v})	+32.0 km/s
Proper motion (μ)	RA: −0.931 mas/yr Dec.: −11.435 mas/yr
Parallax (π)	7.5819±0.1868 mas
Distance	430 ± 10 ly (132 ± 3 pc)
Absolute magnitude (M_{V})	−1.4

Details
Mass	4.15±0.06 M_{☉}
Radius	6.08±0.17 R_{☉}
Luminosity	537±25 L_{☉}
Surface gravity (log g)	3.51±0.02 cgs
Temperature	11,732^{+38}_{−40} K
Metallicity [Fe/H]	−0.24 dex
Rotation	6.214 days
Rotational velocity (v sin i)	30 km/s

Other designations
- Muliphein, Muliphen, γ Canis Majoris, 23 Canis Majoris, BD−15°1625, FK5 271, GC 9320, HD 53244, HIP 34045, HR 2657, SAO 152303

Database references
SIMBAD	data

Gamma Canis Majoris is a blue-white star in the constellation of Canis Major. Its name is a Bayer designation; it has the proper name Muliphein, pronounced /ˈmjuːlɪfeɪn/. With an apparent visual magnitude of +4.10, it is faintly visible to the naked eye. The reason why this relatively faint star was given the 'gamma' designation is uncertain, but possibly because it is in the same part of the constellation as Sirius (alpha) and Mirzam (beta). Based on parallax measurements, it is located at a distance of 430 light-years (132 pc) from the Earth. It is drifting further away with a line of sight velocity of +32 km/s.

== Nomenclature ==
γ Canis Majoris (Latinised to Gamma Canis Majoris) is the star's Bayer designation, abbreviated Gamma CMa or γ CMa.

It bore the traditional name Muliphein, not to be confused with Muhlifain, which is Gamma Centauri; both names derive from the same Arabic root, محلفين muħlifayn. It comes from the Arabic phrase al-muhlifein, meaning "the two stars sworn by. In 2016, the International Astronomical Union organized a Working Group on Star Names (WGSN) to catalogue and standardize proper names for stars. The WGSN approved the name Muliphein for this star on 21 August 2016 and it is now so entered in the IAU Catalog of Star Names.

== Properties ==
Gamma Canis Majoris is a B-type bright giant with a stellar classification of B8II. It is a chemically peculiar mercury-manganese star displaying abnormal lines of mercury and magnesium. The star displays spectral variability, and is spinning on its axis with a period of 6.2 days. It has 4.2 times the mass of the Sun and 6.1 times the Sun's radius. The star is radiating 537 times the luminosity of the Sun from its photosphere at an effective temperature of 11,732 K.

This star is suspected of being a spectroscopic binary system, and there is a candidate companion at an angular separation of 0.332″ along a position angle of 114.8°. It is a member of the Collinder 121 open cluster.

== Modern legacy ==
Muliphein appears on the flag of Brazil, symbolizing the state of Rondônia.

The US Navy cargo ship USS Muliphen (AKA-61) was named after the star.
