= Xi2 Canis Majoris =

Star in the constellation Canis Major

Xi^{2} Canis Majoris
- Location of ξ^{2} Canis Majoris (circled in red)

Observation data Epoch J2000.0 Equinox J2000.0 (ICRS)
- Constellation: Canis Major
- Right ascension: 06^{h} 35^{m} 03.388^{s}
- Declination: −22° 57′ 53.26″
- Apparent magnitude (V): +4.54

Characteristics
- Spectral type: A0 V or A0 III
- U−B color index: −0.01
- B−V color index: −0.06

Astrometry
Radial velocity (R_{v})	+22.11±0.60 km/s
Proper motion (μ)	RA: +16.316 mas/yr Dec.: +16.885 mas/yr
Parallax (π)	8.0342±0.2216 mas
Distance	410 ± 10 ly (124 ± 3 pc)
Absolute magnitude (M_{V})	+0.94

Details
Mass	4.08±0.20 M_{☉}
Radius	5.959 R_{☉}
Luminosity	247 L_{☉}
Temperature	9,381 K
Rotational velocity (v sin i)	145 km/s
Age	339 Myr

Other designations
- ξ^{2} CMa, 5 Canis Majoris, BD−22°1458, FK5 249, GC 8577, HD 46933, HIP 31416, HR 2414, SAO 171982

Database references
SIMBAD	data

Xi^{2} Canis Majoris is an astrometric binary star system in the southern constellation of Canis Major. Its name is Latinized from ξ^{2} Canis Majoris, and abbreviated Xi^{2} CMa or ξ^{2} CMa. With an apparent visual magnitude of +4.54, it is bright enough to be visible to the naked eye. Based upon an annual parallax shift of 8.03 mas, the system is approximately 410 light years distant from Earth. It is receding with a radial velocity of +22 km/s.

The binary nature of this system was determined based on changes in the proper motion of the visible component. W. Buscombe (1962) gave the white-hued primary a stellar classification of A0 V, indicating it is an A-type main-sequence star. However, N. Houk and M. Smith-Moore (1978) list it with a class of A0 III, which would match a more evolved giant star, also of the A-type. It is 339 million years old with a high rate of spin, having a projected rotational velocity of 145 km/s. This is giving the star an equatorial bulge that is about 12% wider than the polar diameter. The star has four times the mass of the Sun and six times the Sun's girth. It is radiating 247 times the Sun's luminosity from its photosphere at an effective temperature of 9,381 K.
