= Canis Major =

Constellation in the southern celestial hemisphere

- Constellation
- List of stars in Canis Major
- Abbreviation: CMa
- Genitive: Canis Majoris
- Pronunciation: /ˌkeɪnɪs ˈmeɪdʒər/ KAY-niss MAY-jər, genitive /ˌkeɪnɪs məˈdʒɔːrɪs/ KAY-niss mə-JOR-iss
- Symbolism: the greater dog
- Right ascension: 06^{h} 12.5^{m} –07^{h} 27.5^{m}
- Declination: −11.03°–−33.25°
- Area: 380 sq. deg. (43rd)
- Main stars: 8
- Bayer/Flamsteed stars: 32
- Stars brighter than 3.00^{m}: 5
- Stars within 10.00 pc (32.62 ly): 2
- Brightest star: Sirius (α CMa) (−1.46^{m})
- Nearest star: Sirius (α CMa)
- Messier objects: 1
- Meteor showers: 0
- Bordering constellations: Monoceros; Lepus; Columba; Puppis
- Visible at latitudes between +60° and −90°. Best visible at 21:00 (9 p.m.) during the month of February.

Canis Major is a constellation in the southern celestial hemisphere. In the second century, it was included in Ptolemy's 48 constellations, and is counted among the 88 modern constellations. Its name is Latin for "greater dog" in contrast to Canis Minor, the "lesser dog"; both figures are commonly represented as following the constellation of Orion, the hunter, through the sky. The Milky Way passes through Canis Major and several open clusters lie within its borders, most notably M41.

Canis Major contains Sirius, the brightest star in the night sky, known as the "dog star". It is very bright because of its proximity to the Solar System and its intrinsic brightness. In contrast, the other bright stars of the constellation are stars of great distance and high luminosity. At magnitude 1.5, Epsilon Canis Majoris (Adhara) is the second-brightest star of the constellation and the brightest source of extreme ultraviolet radiation in the night sky. Next in brightness are the yellow-white supergiant Delta (Wezen) at 1.8, the blue-white giant Beta (Mirzam) at 2.0, blue-white supergiants Eta (Aludra) at 2.4 and Omicron^{2} at 3.0, and white spectroscopic binary Zeta (Furud), also at 3.0. The red hypergiant VY CMa is one of the largest stars known, while the neutron star RX J0720.4-3125 has a radius of a mere 5 km.

== History and mythology ==
=== In Western astronomy ===
In ancient Mesopotamia, Sirius, named KAK.SI.SA_{2} (Sumerian: 𒀯𒆕𒋛𒁲) by the Babylonians, was seen as an arrow aiming towards Orion, while the southern stars of Canis Major and a part of Puppis were viewed as a bow, named BAN in the Three Stars Each tablets, dating to around 1100 BC. In the later compendium of Babylonian astronomy and astrology titled MUL.APIN, the arrow, Sirius, was also linked with the warrior Ninurta, and the bow with Ishtar, daughter of Enlil. Ninurta was linked to the later deity Marduk, who was said to have slain the ocean goddess Tiamat with a great bow, and worshipped as the principal deity in Babylon. The Ancient Greeks replaced the bow and arrow depiction with that of a dog.

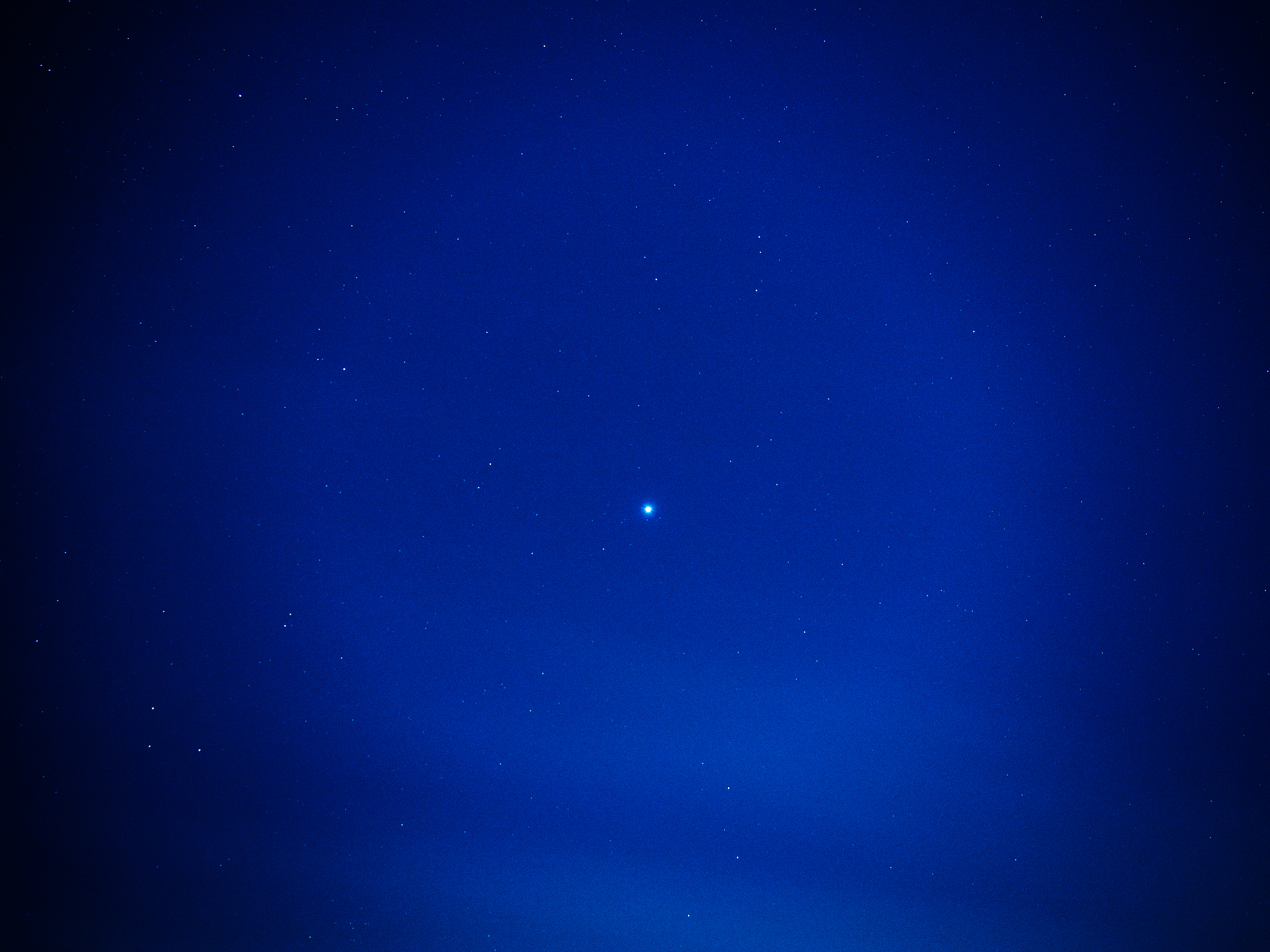
Sirius A, the brightest star in the night sky, lies in Canis Major (field of view approximately 10°).

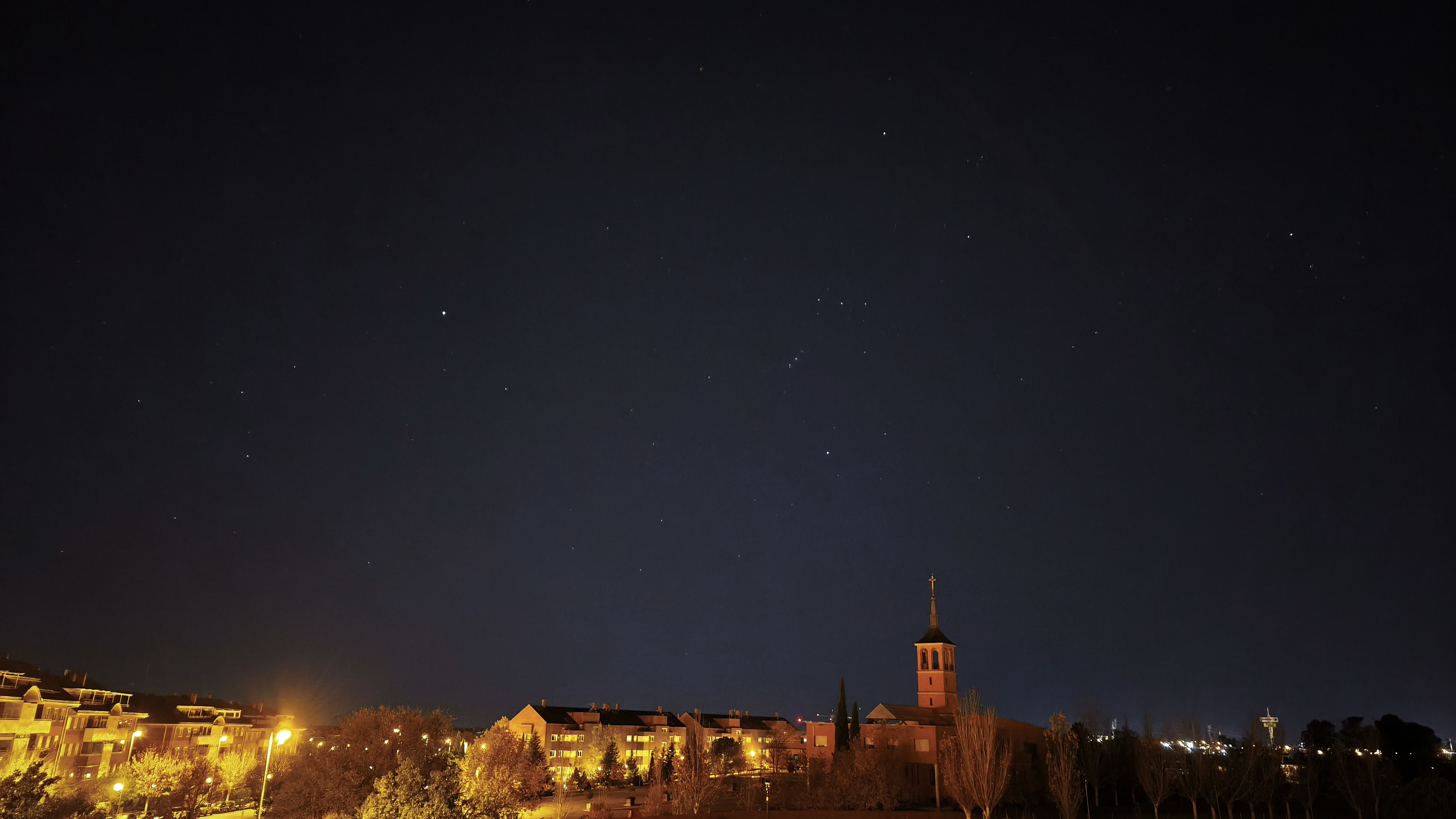
Canis Major and Orion constellations

In Greek Mythology, Canis Major represented the dog Laelaps, a gift from Zeus to Europa; or sometimes the hound of Procris, Diana's nymph; or the one given by Aurora to Cephalus, so famed for its speed that Zeus elevated it to the sky. It was also considered to represent one of Orion's hunting dogs, pursuing Lepus the Hare or helping Orion fight Taurus the Bull; and is referred to in this way by Aratos, Homer and Hesiod. The ancient Greeks refer only to one dog, but by Roman times, Canis Minor appears as Orion's second dog. Alternative names include Canis Sequens and Canis Alter. Canis Syrius was the name used in the 1521 Alfonsine tables.

The Roman myth refers to Canis Major as Custos Europae, the dog guarding Europa but failing to prevent her abduction by Jupiter in the form of a bull, and as Janitor Lethaeus, "the watchdog". In medieval Arab astronomy, the constellation became al-Kalb al-Akbar, "the Greater Dog", transcribed as Alcheleb Alachbar by 17th century writer Edmund Chilmead. Islamic scholar Abū Rayḥān al-Bīrūnī referred to Orion as Kalb al-Jabbār, "the Dog of the Giant". Among the Merazig of Tunisia, shepherds note six constellations that mark the passage of the dry, hot season. One of them, called Merzem, includes the stars of Canis Major and Canis Minor and is the herald of two weeks of hot weather.

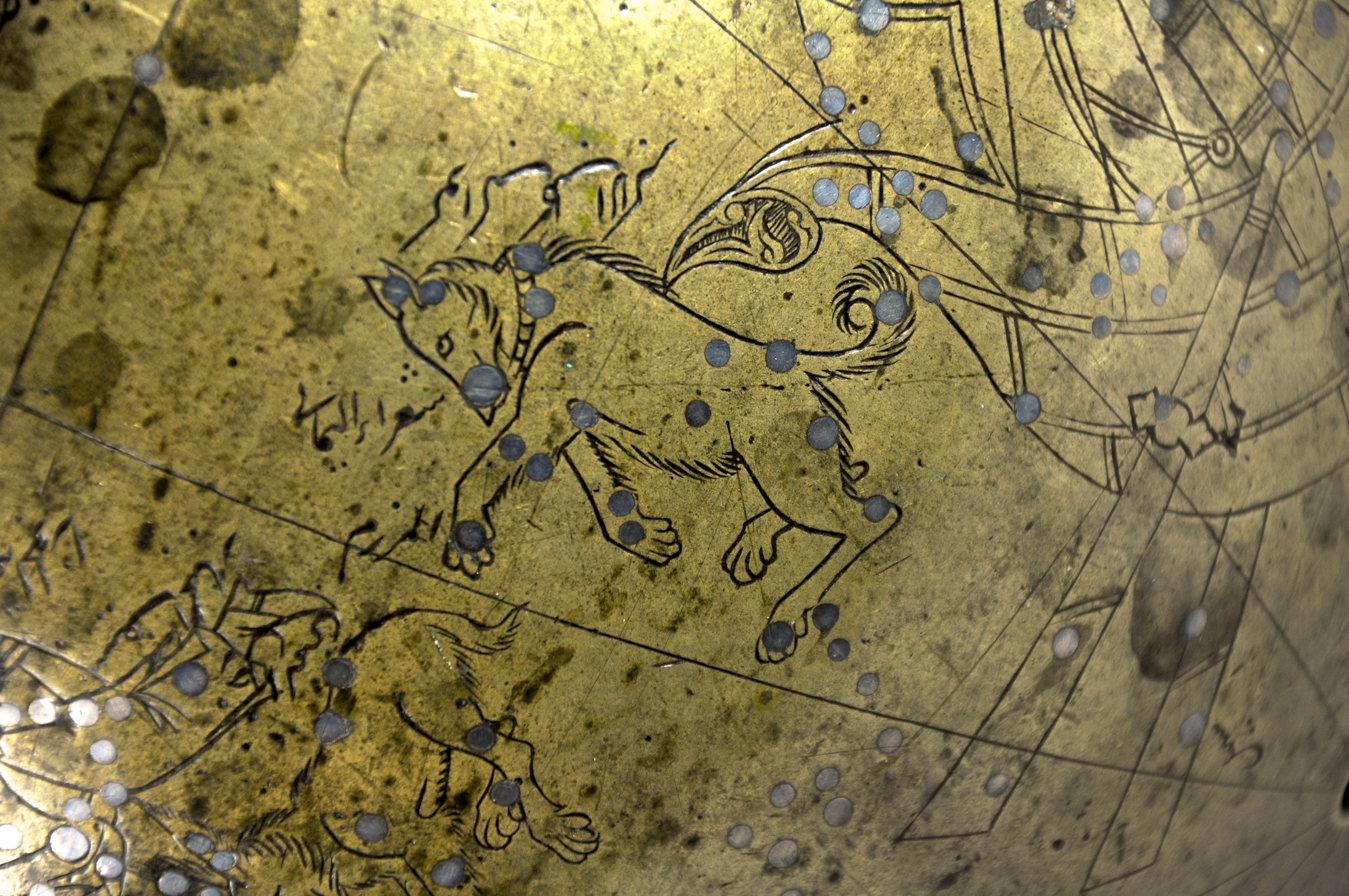
Canis Major as depicted on the Manuchihr Globe made in Mashhad 1632–33 AD. Adilnor Collection, Sweden.

=== In non-Western astronomy ===
In Chinese astronomy, the modern constellation of Canis Major is located in the Vermilion Bird (南方朱雀; Nán Fāng Zhū Què), where the stars were classified in several separate asterisms of stars. The Military Market (軍市; Jūnshì) was a circular pattern of stars containing Nu^{3}, Beta, Xi^{1} and Xi^{2}, and some stars from Lepus. The Wild Cockerel (野雞; Yějī) was at the centre of the Military Market, although it is uncertain which stars depicted what. Schlegel reported that the stars Omicron and Pi Canis Majoris might have been them, while Beta or Nu^{2} have also been proposed. Sirius was Tiānláng (天狼), the Celestial Wolf, denoting invasion and plunder. Southeast of the Wolf was the asterism Húshǐ (弧矢), the celestial Bow and Arrow, which was interpreted as containing Delta, Epsilon, Eta and Kappa Canis Majoris and Delta Velorum. Alternatively, the arrow was depicted by Omicron^{2} and Eta and aiming at Sirius (the Wolf), while the bow comprised Kappa, Epsilon, Sigma, Delta and 164 Canis Majoris, and Pi and Omicron Puppis.

Both the Māori people and the people of the Tuamotus recognized the figure of Canis Major as a distinct entity, though it was sometimes absorbed into other constellations. Te Huinga-o-Rehua, also called Te Putahi-nui-o-Rehua and Te Kahui-Takurua, ("The Assembly of Rehua" or "The Assembly of Sirius") was a Māori constellation that included both Canis Minor and Canis Major, along with some surrounding stars. Related was Taumata-o-Rehua, also called Pukawanui, the Mirror of Rehua, formed from an undefined group of stars in Canis Major. They called Sirius Rehua and Takarua, corresponding to two of the names for the constellation, though Rehua was a name applied to other stars in various Māori groups and other Polynesian cosmologies. The Tuamotu people called Canis Major Muihanga-hetika-o-Takurua, "the abiding assemblage of Takarua".

The Tharumba people of the Shoalhaven River saw three stars of Canis Major as Wunbula (Bat) and his two wives Murrumbool (Mrs Brown Snake) and Moodtha (Mrs Black Snake); bored of following their husband around, the women try to bury him while he is hunting a wombat down its hole. He spears them and all three are placed in the sky as the constellation Munowra. To the Boorong people of Victoria, Sigma Canis Majoris was Unurgunite (which has become the official name of this star), and its flanking stars Delta and Epsilon were his two wives. The moon (Mityan, "native cat") sought to lure the further wife (Epsilon) away, but Unurgunite assaulted him and he has been wandering the sky ever since.

== Characteristics ==
Canis Major is a constellation in the Southern Hemisphere's summer (or northern hemisphere's winter) sky, bordered by Monoceros (which lies between it and Canis Minor) to the north, Puppis to the east and southeast, Columba to the southwest, and Lepus to the west. The three-letter abbreviation for the constellation, as adopted by the International Astronomical Union in 1922, is "CMa". The official constellation boundaries, as set by Belgian astronomer Eugène Delporte in 1930, are defined by a quadrilateral; in the equatorial coordinate system, the right ascension coordinates of these borders lie between 06^{h} 12.5^{m} and 07^{h} 27.5^{m} , while the declination coordinates are between −11.03° and −33.25°. Covering 380 square degrees or 0.921% of the sky, it ranks 43rd of the 88 currently-recognized constellations in size.

== Features ==
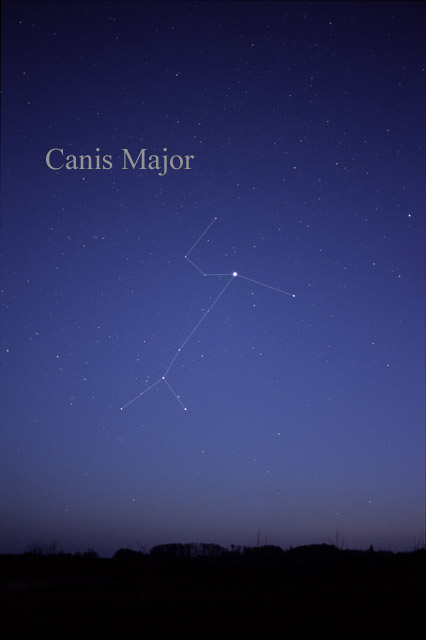
The stars of Canis Major as they can be seen by the naked eye; lines have been added for clarity.

=== Stars ===
Canis Major is a prominent constellation because of its many bright stars. These include Sirius (Alpha Canis Majoris), the brightest star in the night sky, as well as three other stars above magnitude 2.0. Furthermore, two other stars are thought to have previously outshone all others in the night sky—Adhara (Epsilon Canis Majoris) shone at −3.99 around 4.7 million years ago, and Mirzam (Beta Canis Majoris) peaked at −3.65 around 4.42 million years ago. Another, NR Canis Majoris, will be brightest at magnitude −0.88 in about 2.87 million years' time.

The German cartographer Johann Bayer used the Greek letters Alpha through Omicron to label the most prominent stars in the constellation, including three adjacent stars as Nu and two further pairs as Xi and Omicron, while subsequent observers designated further stars in the southern parts of the constellation that were hard to discern from Central Europe. Bayer's countryman Johann Elert Bode later added Sigma, Tau and Omega; the French astronomer Nicolas Louis de Lacaille added lettered stars a to k (though none are in use today). John Flamsteed numbered 31 stars, with 3 Canis Majoris being placed by Lacaille into Columba as Delta Columbae (Flamsteed had not recognised Columba as a distinct constellation). He also labelled two stars—his 10 and 13 Canis Majoris—as Kappa^{1} and Kappa^{2} respectively, but subsequent cartographers such as Francis Baily and John Bevis dropped the fainter former star, leaving Kappa^{2} as the sole Kappa. Flamsteed's listing of Nu^{1}, Nu^{2}, Nu^{3}, Xi^{1}, Xi^{2}, Omicron^{1} and Omicron^{2} have all remained in use.

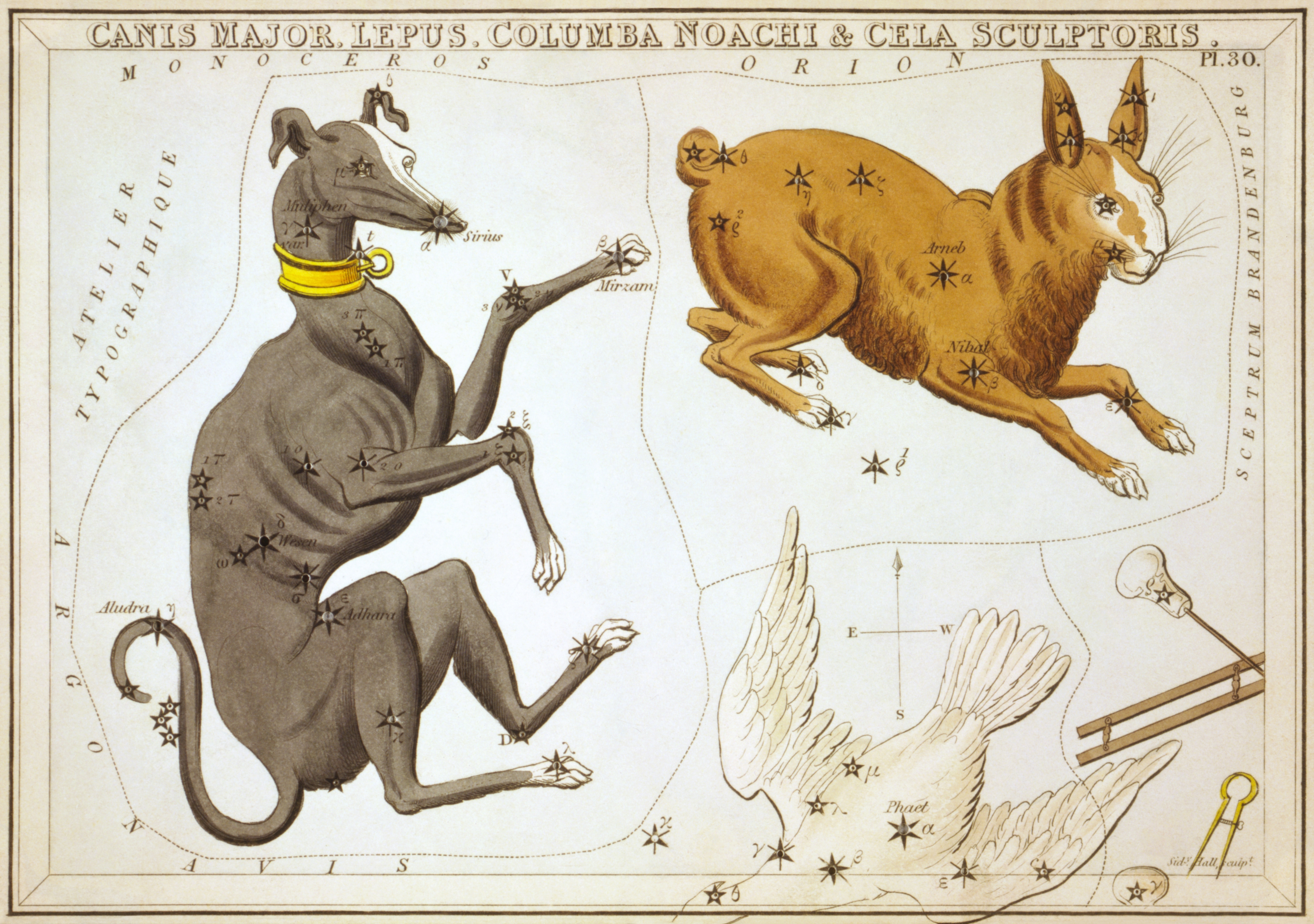
Canis Major as depicted in Urania's Mirror, a set of constellation cards published in London c.1825. Next to it are Lepus and Columba (partly cut off).

Sirius is the brightest star in the night sky at apparent magnitude −1.46 and one of the closest stars to Earth at a distance of 8.6 light-years. Its name comes from the Greek word for "scorching" or "searing". Sirius is also a binary star; its companion Sirius B is a white dwarf with a magnitude of 8.4–10,000 times fainter than Sirius A to observers on Earth. The two orbit each other every 50 years. Their closest approach last occurred in 1993 and they will be at their greatest separation between 2020 and 2025. Sirius was the basis for the ancient Egyptian calendar. The star marked the Great Dog's mouth on Bayer's star atlas.

Flanking Sirius are Beta and Gamma Canis Majoris. Also called Mirzam or Murzim, Beta is a blue-white Beta Cephei variable star of magnitude 2.0, which varies by a few hundredths of a magnitude over a period of six hours. Mirzam is 500 light-years from Earth, and its traditional name means "the announcer", referring to its position as the "announcer" of Sirius, as it rises a few minutes before Sirius does. Gamma, also known as Muliphein, is a fainter star of magnitude 4.12, in reality a blue-white bright giant of spectral type B8IIe located 441 light-years from earth. Iota Canis Majoris, lying between Sirius and Gamma, is another star that has been classified as a Beta Cephei variable, varying from magnitude 4.36 to 4.40 over a period of 1.92 hours. It is a remote blue-white supergiant star of spectral type B3Ib, around 46,000 times as luminous as the sun and, at 2500 light-years distant, 300 times further away than Sirius.

Epsilon, Omicron^{2}, Delta, and Eta Canis Majoris were called Al Adzari "the virgins" in medieval Arabic tradition. Marking the dog's right thigh on Bayer's atlas is Epsilon Canis Majoris, also known as Adhara. At magnitude 1.5, it is the second-brightest star in Canis Major and the 23rd-brightest star in the sky. It is a blue-white supergiant of spectral type B2Iab, around 404 light-years from Earth. This star is one of the brightest known extreme ultraviolet sources in the sky. It is a binary star; the secondary is of magnitude 7.4. Its traditional name means "the virgins", having been transferred from the group of stars to Epsilon alone. Nearby is Delta Canis Majoris, also called Wezen. It is a yellow-white supergiant of spectral type F8Iab and magnitude 1.84, around 1605 light-years from Earth. With a traditional name meaning "the weight", Wezen is 17 times as massive and 50,000 times as luminous as the Sun. If located in the centre of the Solar System, it would extend out to Earth as its diameter is 200 times that of the Sun. Only around 10 million years old, Wezen has stopped fusing hydrogen in its core. Its outer envelope is beginning to expand and cool, and in the next 100,000 years it will become a red supergiant as its core fuses heavier and heavier elements. Once it has a core of iron, it will collapse and explode as a supernova. Nestled between Adhara and Wezen lies Sigma Canis Majoris, known as Unurgunite to the Boorong and Wotjobaluk people, a red supergiant of spectral type K7Ib that varies irregularly between magnitudes 3.43 and 3.51.

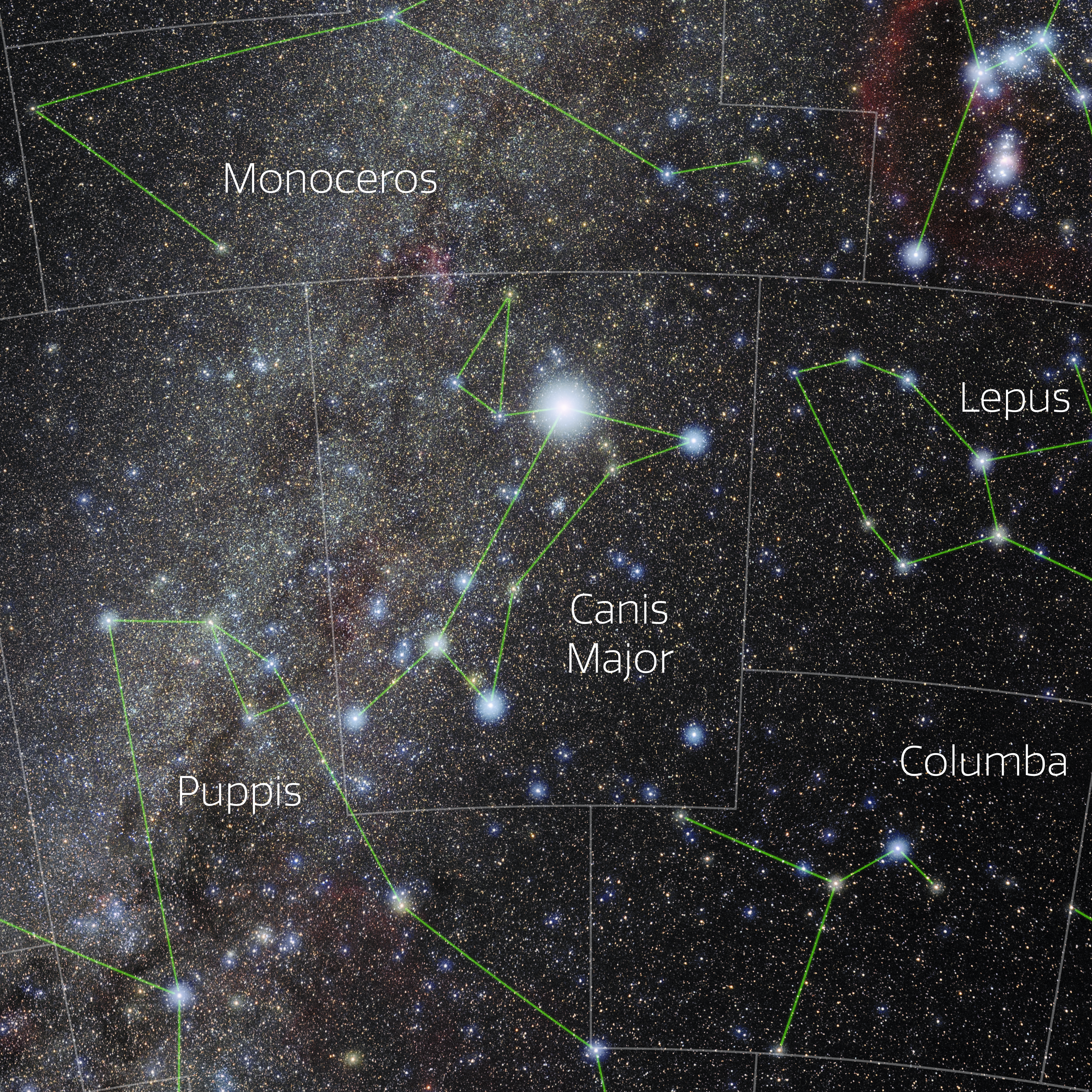
The constellation Canis Major showing the IAU boundaries, the constellation stick figure, and labels for its brightest stars. Astrophotograph by Eckhard Slawik, from NOIRLab's 88 Constellations project.

Also called Aludra, Eta Canis Majoris is a blue-white supergiant of spectral type B5Ia with a luminosity 176,000 times and diameter around 80 times that of the Sun. Classified as an Alpha Cygni type variable star, Aludra varies in brightness from magnitude 2.38 to 2.48 over a period of 4.7 days. It is located 1120 light-years away. To the west of Adhara lies 3.0-magnitude Zeta Canis Majoris or Furud, around 362 light-years distant from Earth. It is a spectroscopic binary, whose components orbit each other every 1.85 years, the combined spectrum indicating a main star of spectral type B2.5V.

Between these stars and Sirius lie Omicron^{1}, Omicron^{2}, and Pi Canis Majoris. Omicron^{2} is a massive supergiant star about 21 times as massive as the Sun. Only 7 million years old, it has exhausted the supply of hydrogen at its core and is now processing helium. It is an Alpha Cygni variable that undergoes periodic non-radial pulsations, which cause its brightness to cycle from magnitude 2.93 to 3.08 over a 24.44-day interval. Omicron^{1} is an orange K-type supergiant of spectral type K2.5Iab that is an irregular variable star, varying between apparent magnitudes 3.78 and 3.99. Around 18 times as massive as the Sun, it shines with 65,000 times its luminosity.

North of Sirius lie Theta and Mu Canis Majoris, Theta being the most northerly star with a Bayer designation in the constellation. Around 8 billion years old, it is an orange giant of spectral type K4III that is around as massive as the Sun but has expanded to 30 times the Sun's diameter. Mu is a multiple star system located around 1244 light-years distant, its components discernible in a small telescope as a 5.3-magnitude yellow-hued and 7.1-magnitude bluish star. The brighter star is a giant of spectral type K2III, while the companion is a main sequence star of spectral type B9.5V. Nu^{1} Canis Majoris is a yellow-hued giant star of magnitude 5.7, 278 light-years away; it is at the threshold of naked-eye visibility. It has a companion of magnitude 8.1.

At the southern limits of the constellation lie Kappa and Lambda Canis Majoris. Although of similar spectra and nearby each other as viewed from Earth, they are unrelated. Kappa is a Gamma Cassiopeiae variable of spectral type B2Vne, which brightened by 50% between 1963 and 1978, from magnitude 3.96 or so to 3.52. It is around 659 light-years distant. Lambda is a blue-white B-type main sequence dwarf with an apparent magnitude of 4.48 located around 423 light-years from Earth. It is 3.7 times as wide as and 5.5 times as massive as the Sun, and shines with 940 times its luminosity.

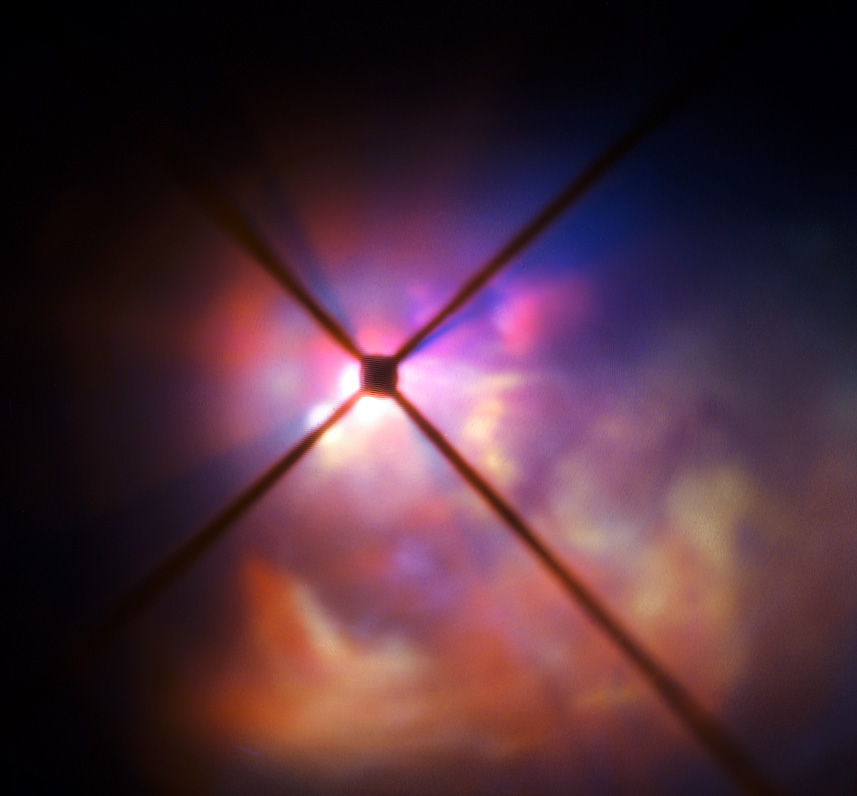
Very Large Telescope image of the surroundings of VY Canis Majoris

Canis Major is also home to many variable stars. EZ Canis Majoris is a Wolf–Rayet star of spectral type WN4 that varies between magnitudes 6.71 and 6.95 over a period of 3.766 days; the cause of its variability is unknown but thought to be related to its stellar wind and rotation. VY Canis Majoris is a remote red hypergiant located approximately 3,800 light-years away from Earth. It is one of largest stars known (sometimes described as the largest known) and is also one of the most luminous with a radius around 1,420 times the Sun's radius, and a luminosity around 270,000 times greater than the Sun. Its current mass is about 17 ± 8 solar masses, having shed material from an initial mass of 25–32 solar masses. VY CMa is also surrounded by a red reflection nebula that has been made by the material expelled by the strong stellar winds of its central star. W Canis Majoris is a type of red giant known as a carbon star—a semiregular variable, it ranges between magnitudes 6.27 and 7.09 over a period of 160 days. A cool star, it has a surface temperature of around 2,900 K and a radius 234 times that of the Sun, its distance estimated at 1,444–1,450 light-years from Earth. At the other extreme in size is RX J0720.4-3125, a neutron star with a radius of around 5 km. Exceedingly faint, it has an apparent magnitude of 26.6. Its spectrum and temperature appear to be mysteriously changing over several years. The nature of the changes are unclear, but it is possible they were caused by an event such as the star's absorption of an accretion disc.

Tau Canis Majoris is a Beta Lyrae-type eclipsing multiple star system that varies from magnitude 4.32 to 4.37 over 1.28 days. Its four main component stars are hot O-type stars, with a combined mass 80 times that of the Sun and shining with 500,000 times its luminosity, but little is known of their individual properties. A fifth component, a magnitude 10 star, lies at a distance of 13,000 astronomical units (0.21 ly). The system is only 5 million years old. UW Canis Majoris is another Beta Lyrae-type star 3000 light-years from Earth; it is an eclipsing binary that ranges in magnitude from a minimum of 5.3 to a maximum of 4.8. It has a period of 4.4 days; its components are two massive hot blue stars, one a blue supergiant of spectral type O7.5–8 Iab, while its companion is a slightly cooler, less evolved and less luminous supergiant of spectral type O9.7Ib. The stars are 200,000 and 63,000 times as luminous as the Sun. However the fainter star is the more massive at 19 solar masses to the primary's 16. R Canis Majoris is another eclipsing binary that varies from magnitude 5.7 to 6.34 over 1.13 days, with a third star orbiting these two every 93 years. The shortness of the orbital period and the low ratio between the two main components make this an unusual Algol-type system.

Seven star systems have been found to have planets. Nu^{2} Canis Majoris is an ageing orange giant of spectral type K1III of apparent magnitude 3.91 located around 64 light-years distant. Around 1.5 times as massive and 11 times as luminous as the Sun, it is orbited over a period of 763 days by a planet 2.6 times as massive as Jupiter. HD 47536 is likewise an ageing orange giant found to have a planetary system—echoing the fate of the Solar System in a few billion years as the Sun ages and becomes a giant. Conversely, HD 45364 is a star 107 light-years distant that is a little smaller and cooler than the Sun, of spectral type G8V, which has two planets discovered in 2008. With orbital periods of 228 and 342 days, the planets have a 3:2 orbital resonance, which helps stabilise the system. HD 47186 is another sunlike star with two planets; the inner—HD 47186 b—takes four days to complete an orbit and has been classified as a Hot Neptune, while the outer—HD 47186 c—has an eccentric 3.7-year period orbit and has a similar mass to Saturn. HD 43197 is a sunlike star around 183 light-years distant that has two planets: a hot Jupiter-size planet with an eccentric orbit. The other planet, HD 43197 c, is another massive Jovian planet with a slightly oblong orbit outside of its habitable zone.

Z Canis Majoris is a star system a mere 300,000 years old composed of two pre-main-sequence stars—a FU Orionis star and a Herbig Ae/Be star, which has brightened episodically by two magnitudes to magnitude 8 in 1987, 2000, 2004 and 2008. The more massive Herbig Ae/Be star is enveloped in an irregular roughly spherical cocoon of dust that has an inner diameter of 20 AU (3.0×10^{9} km) and outer diameter of 50 AU (7.5×10^{9} km). The cocoon has a hole in it through which light shines that covers an angle of 5 to 10 degrees of its circumference. Both stars are surrounded by a large envelope of in-falling material left over from the original cloud that formed the system. Both stars are emitting jets of material, that of the Herbig Ae/Be star being much larger—11.7 light-years long. Meanwhile, FS Canis Majoris is another star with infra-red emissions indicating a compact shell of dust, but it appears to be a main-sequence star that has absorbed material from a companion. These stars are thought to be significant contributors to interstellar dust.

=== Deep-sky objects ===
The band of the Milky Way goes through Canis Major, with only patchy obscurement by interstellar dust clouds. It is bright in the northeastern corner of the constellation, as well as in a triangular area between Adhara, Wezen and Aludra, with many stars visible in binoculars. Canis Major boasts several open clusters. The only Messier object is M41 (NGC 2287), an open cluster with a combined visual magnitude of 4.5, around 2300 light-years from Earth. Located 4 degrees south of Sirius, it contains contrasting blue, yellow and orange stars and covers an area the apparent size of the full moon—in reality around 25 light-years in diameter. Its most luminous stars have already evolved into giants. The brightest is a 6.3-magnitude star of spectral type K3. Located in the field is 12 Canis Majoris, though this star is only 670 light-years distant. NGC 2360, known as Caroline's Cluster after its discoverer Caroline Herschel, is an open cluster located 3.5 degrees west of Muliphein and has a combined apparent magnitude of 7.2. Around 15 light-years in diameter, it is located 3700 light-years away from Earth, and has been dated to around 2.2 billion years old. NGC 2362 is a small, compact open cluster, 5200 light-years from Earth. It contains about 60 stars, of which Tau Canis Majoris is the brightest member. Located around 3 degrees northeast of Wezen, it covers an area around 12 light-years in diameter, though the stars appear huddled around Tau when seen through binoculars. It is a very young open cluster as its member stars are only a few million years old. Lying 2 degrees southwest of NGC 2362 is NGC 2354 a fainter open cluster of magnitude 6.5, with around 15 member stars visible with binoculars. Located around 30' northeast of NGC 2360, NGC 2359 (Thor's Helmet or the Duck Nebula) is a relatively bright emission nebula in Canis Major, with an approximate magnitude of 10, which is 10,000 light-years from Earth. The nebula is shaped by HD 56925, an unstable Wolf–Rayet star embedded within it.

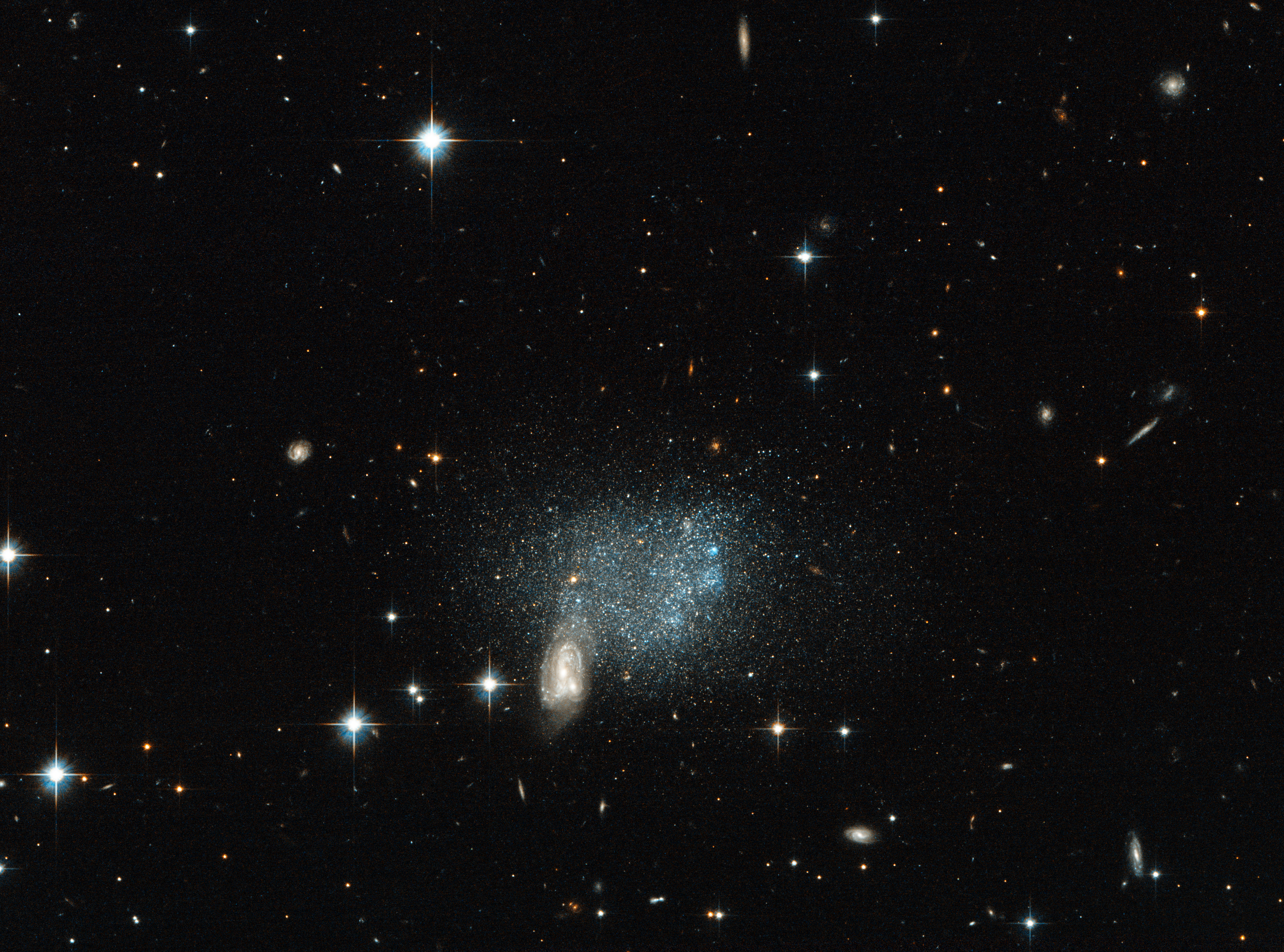
ESO 489-056 is an irregular dwarf galaxy, located 16 million light-years distant.

In 2003, an overdensity of stars in the region was announced to be the Canis Major Dwarf, the closest satellite galaxy to Earth. However, there remains debate over whether it represents a disrupted dwarf galaxy or in fact a variation in the thin and thick disk and spiral arm populations of the Milky Way. Investigation of the area yielded only ten RR Lyrae variables—consistent with the Milky Way's halo and thick disk populations rather than a separate dwarf spheroidal galaxy. On the other hand, a globular cluster in Puppis, NGC 2298—which appears to be part of the Canis Major dwarf system—is extremely metal-poor, suggesting it did not arise from the Milky Way's thick disk, and instead is of extragalactic origin.

NGC 2207 and IC 2163 are a pair of face-on interacting spiral galaxies located 125 million light-years from Earth. About 40 million years ago, the two galaxies had a close encounter and are now moving farther apart; nevertheless, the smaller IC 2163 will eventually be incorporated into NGC 2207. As the interaction continues, gas and dust will be perturbed, sparking extensive star formation in both galaxies. Supernovae have been observed in NGC 2207 in 1975 (type Ia SN 1975a), 1999 (the type Ib SN 1999ec), 2003 (type 1b supernova SN 2003H), and 2013 (type II supernova SN 2013ai). Located 16 million light-years distant, ESO 489-056 is an irregular dwarf- and low-surface-brightness galaxy that has one of the lowest metallicities known.
