= List of stars in Canis Major =

This is the list of notable stars in the constellation Canis Major, sorted by decreasing brightness.

== List ==
Name	B	F	Var	HD	HIP	RA	Dec	vis. mag.	abs. mag.	Dist. (ly)	Sp. class	Notes
Sirius A, B	α	9		48915	32349	06^{h} 45^{m} 09.25^{s}	−16° 42′ 47.3″	−1.46	1.42	8.6	A0m...	Alhabor, Aschere, Canicula, the Dog Star; brightest star, 5th nearest star system; binary
ε CMa	ε	21		52089	33579	06^{h} 58^{m} 37.55^{s}	−28° 58′ 19.5″	1.50	−4.10	431	B2II	Adhara, Aoul al Adzari, Prima Virginum part of Al ʽAdhārā or Al Adzari
δ CMa	δ	25		54605	34444	07^{h} 08^{m} 23.49^{s}	−26° 23′ 35.5″	1.83	−6.87	1791	F8Ia	Wezen, Thalath al Adzari, Tertia Virginum, part of Al ʽAdhārā or Al Adzari; variable star, ΔV = 0.004^{m}, P = 24.08478 d
β CMa	β	2		44743	30324	06^{h} 22^{m} 41.99^{s}	−17° 57′ 21.3″	1.98	−3.95	499	B1II/III	Mirzam (Murzim); β Cep variable, V_{max} = 1.93^{m}, V_{min} = 2^{m}, P = 0.25003 d
η CMa	η	31		58350	35904	07^{h} 24^{m} 05.71^{s}	−29° 18′ 11.2″	2.45	−7.51	3196	B5Ia	Aludra, part of Al ʽAdhārā or Al Adzari; α Cyg variable
ζ CMa	ζ	1		44402	30122	06^{h} 20^{m} 18.79^{s}	−30° 03′ 48.2″	3.02	−2.05	336	B2.5V	Furud; spectroscopic binary; suspected variable
ο^{2} CMa	ο^{2}	24		53138	33977	07^{h} 03^{m} 01.47^{s}	−23° 49′ 59.9″	3.02	−6.46	2567	B3Ia	Thanih al Adzari, Secunda Virginum, part of Al ʽAdhārā or Al Adzari; α Cyg variable
σ CMa	σ	22		52877	33856	07^{h} 01^{m} 43.15^{s}	−27° 56′ 05.4″	3.49	−4.37	1216	K4III	Unurgunite, irregular variable, V_{max} = 3.43^{m}, V_{min} = 3.51^{m}
κ CMa	κ	13		50013	32759	06^{h} 49^{m} 50.47^{s}	−32° 30′ 30.6″	3.50	−3.42	789	B1.5IVne	γ Cas variable, V_{max} = 3.40^{m}, V_{min} = 3.97^{m}
ο^{1} CMa	ο^{1}	16		50877	33152	06^{h} 54^{m} 07.95^{s}	−24° 11′ 03.2″	3.89	−5.02	1976	K3Iab	irregular variable, V_{max} = 3.78^{m}, V_{min} = 3.99^{m}
ν^{2} CMa	ν^{2}	7		47205	31592	06^{h} 36^{m} 41.00^{s}	−19° 15′ 20.6″	3.95	2.46	65	K1III+...	Yějī (野雞), has a planet (b); suspected variable, V_{max} = 3.87^{m}, V_{min} = 3.96^{m}
ω CMa	ω	28		56139	35037	07^{h} 14^{m} 48.66^{s}	−26° 46′ 21.7″	4.01	−3.25	924	B2IV/Ve	γ Cas variable, V_{max} = 3.54^{m}, V_{min} = 4.18^{m}
θ CMa	θ	14		50778	33160	06^{h} 54^{m} 11.48^{s}	−12° 02′ 18.9″	4.08	−0.36	252	K4III	
γ CMa	γ	23		53244	34045	07^{h} 03^{m} 45.49^{s}	−15° 37′ 59.7″	4.12	−1.34	402	B8II	Muliphein; suspected variable
ξ^{1} CMa	ξ^{1}	4		46328	31125	06^{h} 31^{m} 51.37^{s}	−23° 25′ 06.4″	4.34	−4.65	2050	B1III	β Cep variable, V_{max} = 4.33^{m}, V_{min} = 4.36^{m}, P = 0.2095755 d
ι CMa	ι	20		51309	33347	06^{h} 56^{m} 08.23^{s}	−17° 03′ 15.3″	4.36	−5.51	3075	B3Ib/II	β Cep variable, V_{max} = 4.36^{m}, V_{min} = 4.4^{m}, P = 0.08 d
τ CMa	τ	30		57061	35415	07^{h} 18^{m} 42.49^{s}	−24° 57′ 15.8″	4.37	−5.59	3196	O9Ib	member of the NGC 2362 star cluster; β Lyr variable
ν^{3} CMa	ν^{3}	8		47442	31700	06^{h} 37^{m} 53.43^{s}	−18° 14′ 14.8″	4.42	−1.35	464	K0II/III	
27 CMa		27	EW	56014	34981	07^{h} 14^{m} 15.22^{s}	−26° 21′ 09.1″	4.42	−4.00	1575	B3IIIe	binary, component A spectroscopic binary, component B γ Cas variable, V_{max} = 4.42^{m}, V_{min} = 4.82^{m}
λ CMa	λ			45813	30788	06^{h} 28^{m} 10.22^{s}	−32° 34′ 48.5″	4.47	−1.01	406	B4V	
ξ^{2} CMa	ξ^{2}	5		46933	31416	06^{h} 35^{m} 03.38^{s}	−22° 57′ 53.4″	4.54	−0.97	412	A0III	
π CMa	π (Note: Labelled Pi^{3} Canis Majoris (π^{3} CMa/π^{3} Canis Majoris) by Bode in his Uranographia)	19		51199	33302	06^{h} 55^{m} 37.40^{s}	−20° 08′ 11.7″	4.66	2.33	95	F2IV/V	variable star, ΔV = 0.002^{m}, P = 0.09013 d
HD 56618				56618	35205	07^{h} 16^{m} 35.00^{s}	−27° 52′ 52.6″	4.66	−1.05	453	M2III	suspected variable
HD 47667				47667	31827	06^{h} 39^{m} 16.72^{s}	−14° 08′ 44.7″	4.82	−3.60	1575	K2III	
15 CMa	π^{1} (Note: Labelled Pi^{1} Canis Majoris (π^{1} CMa/π^{1} Canis Majoris) by Bode in his Uranographia)	15	EY	50707	33092	06^{h} 53^{m} 32.91^{s}	−20° 13′ 27.3″	4.82	−3.65	1614	B1IV	β Cep variable, V_{max} = 4.79^{m}, V_{min} = 4.84^{m}, P = 0.184557 d
145 G. CMa				56577	35210	07^{h} 16^{m} 36.84^{s}	−23° 18′ 56.2″	4.83	−6.59	6269	K4III	Double star; suspected variable, V_{max} = 4.78^{m}, V_{min} = 4.86^{m}
UW CMa		29	UW	57060	35412	07^{h} 18^{m} 40.38^{s}	−24° 33′ 31.3″	4.88	−4.93	2991	O7Ia:fp	β Lyr variable, V_{max} = 4.84^{m}, V_{min} = 5.33^{m}, P = 4.393407 d
HD 57821				57821	35727	07^{h} 22^{m} 13.53^{s}	−19° 00′ 59.7″	4.94	−1.06	517	B5II/III	
HD 43445				43445	29735	06^{h} 15^{m} 44.88^{s}	−13° 43′ 06.2″	5.00	−0.30	375	B9V	
μ CMa	μ	18		51250	33345	06^{h} 56^{m} 06.65^{s}	−14° 02′ 36.4″	5.00	−2.22	908	B9.5V	Isis
HD 43827	χ (Note: Labelled Chi Canis Majoris (χ CMa/χ Canis Majoris) by Bode in his Uranographia)			43827	29895	06^{h} 17^{m} 41.73^{s}	−16° 48′ 57.3″	5.15	−1.05	567	K1III	
HD 46184				46184	31084	06^{h} 31^{m} 23.02^{s}	−12° 23′ 30.9″	5.16	0.05	343	K1III	
HD 58343			FW	58343	35951	07^{h} 24^{m} 40.19^{s}	−16° 12′ 05.1″	5.18	−2.13	945	B2Vne	γ Cas variable, V_{max} = 5.^{m}, V_{min} = 5.5^{m}
HD 44951				44951	30457	06^{h} 24^{m} 10.35^{s}	−11° 31′ 48.0″	5.21	−0.34	420	K3III	
10 CMa		10	FT	48917	32292	06^{h} 44^{m} 28.47^{s}	−31° 04′ 13.9″	5.23	−4.29	2608	B2V	γ Cas variable, V_{max} = 5.13^{m}, V_{min} = 5.44^{m}
HD 47536				47536	31688	06^{h} 37^{m} 47.54^{s}	−32° 20′ 23.6″	5.25	−0.17	396	K1III	has two planets (b & c)
11 CMa	ψ^{2} (Note: Labelled Psi^{2} Canis Majoris (ψ^{2} CMa/ψ^{2} Canis Majoris) by Bode in his Uranographia)	11		49229	32492	06^{h} 46^{m} 51.09^{s}	−14° 25′ 33.6″	5.28	−1.19	642	B8/B9III	
HD 51283				51283	33316	06^{h} 55^{m} 46.93^{s}	−22° 56′ 29.2″	5.28	−3.82	2159	B2/B3III	suspected variable
HD 57146				57146	35427	07^{h} 18^{m} 51.28^{s}	−26° 35′ 09.1″	5.29	−2.80	1353	G2II	suspected variable
HD 49048	ψ^{1} (Note: Labelled Psi^{1} Canis Majoris (ψ^{1} CMa/ψ^{1} Canis Majoris) by Bode in his Uranographia)			49048	32411	06^{h} 45^{m} 59.40^{s}	−14° 47′ 45.9″	5.30	−0.13	398	A1IV/V	
HD 58535				58535	35957	07^{h} 24^{m} 43.87^{s}	−31° 48′ 32.1″	5.35	−0.79	552	K1III	suspected variable, V_{max} = 5.31^{m}, V_{min} = 5.43^{m}
HD 56342				56342	35083	07^{h} 15^{m} 21.08^{s}	−30° 41′ 11.3″	5.36	−1.12	646	B2V	suspected variable, ΔV = 0.006^{m}
HD 58215				58215	35848	07^{h} 23^{m} 28.97^{s}	−27° 50′ 03.4″	5.37	−0.76	549	K4III	variable star, ΔV = 0.008^{m}, P = 20.67397 d
HD 49662				49662	32677	06^{h} 48^{m} 57.74^{s}	−15° 08′ 41.0″	5.39	−0.96	607	B7IV	variable star, ΔV = 0.010^{m}, P = 1.43019 d
NO CMa			NO	58155	35795	07^{h} 23^{m} 00.70^{s}	−31° 55′ 25.6″	5.40	−2.81	1430	B3V	Be star
FN CMa			FN	53974	34301	07^{h} 06^{m} 40.77^{s}	−11° 17′ 38.5″	5.41	−4.29	2835	B0.5IV	β Cep variable, V_{max} = 5.38^{m}, V_{min} = 5.42^{m}, P = 0.08866 d
HD 58286				58286	35855	07^{h} 23^{m} 31.90^{s}	−32° 12′ 07.5″	5.41	−2.34	1156	B2/B3II/III	
HD 51733				51733	33478	06^{h} 57^{m} 33.97^{s}	−24° 37′ 51.8″	5.45	2.52	126	F3V	
HD 55070				55070	34624	07^{h} 10^{m} 19.33^{s}	−27° 29′ 29.5″	5.46	−1.01	643	G8III	
HD 56405				56405	35180	07^{h} 16^{m} 14.58^{s}	−15° 35′ 08.4″	5.46	0.82	277	A1V	suspected variable
FR CMa			FR	44458	30214	06^{h} 21^{m} 24.72^{s}	−11° 46′ 23.7″	5.48	−3.07	1672	B1Vpe SB	γ Cas variable, V_{max} = 5.46^{m}, V_{min} = 5.64^{m}
HD 43955	φ (Note: Labelled Phi Canis Majoris (φ CMa/φ Canis Majoris) by Bode in his Uranographia)			43955	29941	06^{h} 18^{m} 13.73^{s}	−19° 58′ 01.2″	5.51	−1.91	994	B2/B3V	
HD 56160				56160	35044	07^{h} 14^{m} 51.19^{s}	−27° 02′ 16.5″	5.58	0.97	273	K3III	variable star, ΔV = 0.006^{m}, P = 4.45653 d
HD 52018				52018	33575	06^{h} 58^{m} 35.90^{s}	−25° 24′ 51.0″	5.59	−1.93	1042	B2V	
HD 57478				57478	35615	07^{h} 20^{m} 58.29^{s}	−14° 21′ 37.8″	5.59	−0.57	556	G8/K0III	
NR CMa			NR	58954	36186	07^{h} 27^{m} 07.99^{s}	−17° 51′ 53.5″	5.60	0.93	280	F2V	δ Sct variable
HD 45018				45018	30436	06^{h} 23^{m} 55.91^{s}	−25° 34′ 39.1″	5.61	−1.04	697	K5III	suspected variable
HD 46936				46936	31362	06^{h} 34^{m} 35.33^{s}	−32° 42′ 58.5″	5.62	−0.25	487	B9V	
HR 2501			HP	49131	32385	06^{h} 45^{m} 31.19^{s}	−30° 56′ 56.4″	5.62	−2.81	1583	B+...	γ Cas and λ Eri variable, V_{max} = 5.33^{m}, V_{min} = 5.81^{m}, P = 0.79187 d
LS CMa			LS	52670	33804	07^{h} 01^{m} 05.95^{s}	−25° 12′ 56.3″	5.64	−1.85	1028	B2/B3III/IV	eclipsing binary
HD 50644				50644	33077	06^{h} 53^{m} 18.84^{s}	−19° 01′ 58.0″	5.65	0.63	329	A9/F0III	
FY CMa			FY	58978	36168	07^{h} 26^{m} 59.49^{s}	−23° 05′ 09.7″	5.65	−2.54	1417	B1II	γ Cas variable, V_{max} = 4.8^{m}, V_{min} = 6.25^{m}
LZ CMa			LZ	54912	34579	07^{h} 09^{m} 43.03^{s}	−25° 13′ 51.8″	5.69	−3.06	1831	B2V	β Lyr variable, ΔV = 0.03^{m}
HD 47946				47946	31870	06^{h} 39^{m} 42.67^{s}	−30° 28′ 12.1″	5.70	1.36	241	K1III	
R CMa			R	57167	35487	07^{h} 19^{m} 28.08^{s}	−16° 23′ 41.7″	5.70	2.48	144	F2III/IV	Algol variable, V_{max} = 5.7^{m}, V_{min} = 6.34^{m}, P = 1.1359405 d
ν^{1} CMa	ν^{1}	6		47138	31564	06^{h} 36^{m} 22.86^{s}	−18° 39′ 35.8″	5.71	1.07	277	G8III/F3V...	
HD 46547				46547	31190	06^{h} 32^{m} 38.98^{s}	−32° 01′ 49.6″	5.73	−1.32	838	B2V	suspected variable, ΔV = 5.64^{m}, P = 5.72 d
IY CMa			IY	45871	30840	06^{h} 28^{m} 39.24^{s}	−32° 22′ 16.7″	5.74	−1.27	823	B5IV	Be star; eclipsing binary
HD 50123			HZ	50123	32810	06^{h} 50^{m} 23.35^{s}	−31° 42′ 21.9″	5.74	−0.97	718	B3V	rotating ellipsoidal variable, V_{max} = 5.71^{m}, V_{min} = 5.79^{m}
FV CMa			FV	54309	34360	07^{h} 07^{m} 22.59^{s}	−23° 50′ 26.6″	5.75	−4.04	2964	B2V:nn	γ Cas variable, V_{max} = 5.64^{m}, V_{min} = 5.94^{m}
HD 45765				45765	30836	06^{h} 28^{m} 37.41^{s}	−17° 27′ 57.7″	5.76	0.19	424	K0III	
HD 49980				49980	32809	06^{h} 50^{m} 21.77^{s}	−17° 05′ 04.4″	5.77	−2.62	1552	K3III	
HD 55589				55589	34888	07^{h} 13^{m} 07.20^{s}	−11° 15′ 04.9″	5.77	−0.77	661	K0	
HD 44081				44081	30011	06^{h} 18^{m} 58.98^{s}	−20° 55′ 32.2″	5.79	−2.97	1842	B3II/III	suspected β Cep variable
HD 58461				58461	35998	07^{h} 25^{m} 08.44^{s}	−13° 45′ 07.1″	5.79	3.08	114	F3V	
HD 58612				58612	36024	07^{h} 25^{m} 25.27^{s}	−25° 13′ 04.0″	5.79	−4.19	3228	B5III	
HD 59067				59067	36251	07^{h} 27^{m} 51.66^{s}	−11° 33′ 24.7″	5.79	−1.66	1009	B8Vv comp VB	γ Cas variable, V_{max} = 5.73^{m}, V_{min} = 5.90^{m}
17 CMa	π^{2} (Note: Labelled Pi^{2}Canis Majoris (π^{2}CMa/π^{2}Canis Majoris) by Bode in his Uranographia)	17		51055	33248	06^{h} 55^{m} 02.74^{s}	−20° 24′ 17.5″	5.80	−0.54	605	A2V	
HD 55344				55344	34758	07^{h} 11^{m} 41.61^{s}	−20° 52′ 59.2″	5.84	−0.04	489	A0IV/V	
MZ CMa			MZ	57615	35626	07^{h} 21^{m} 04.34^{s}	−25° 53′ 30.0″	5.87	−0.86	723	M3III	semiregular variable
HD 43396				43396	29679	06^{h} 15^{m} 08.40^{s}	−20° 16′ 20.1″	5.88	−1.39	929	K2III	variable star, ΔV = 0.008^{m}, P = 2.42919 d
26 CMa		26	MM	55522	34798	07^{h} 12^{m} 12.22^{s}	−25° 56′ 33.4″	5.91	−0.80	718	B2IV/V	53 Per variable
HD 46189				46189	31037	06^{h} 30^{m} 46.29^{s}	−27° 46′ 10.5″	5.92	−1.78	1128	B3IV/V	variable star, ΔV = 0.005^{m}, P = 3.28106 d
HD 49095				49095	32366	06^{h} 45^{m} 23.08^{s}	−31° 47′ 34.5″	5.92	3.99	79	F7V	
HD 47182				47182	31599	06^{h} 36^{m} 46.60^{s}	−13° 19′ 15.5″	5.95	−0.91	769	K4/K5III	
HD 55762				55762	34914	07^{h} 13^{m} 24.01^{s}	−22° 40′ 26.9″	5.96	−0.90	780	K4III	suspected variable, ΔV = 0.14^{m}
HD 43544				43544	29771	06^{h} 16^{m} 07.70^{s}	−16° 37′ 04.8″	5.97	−1.07	836	B2/B3V	suspected variable, V_{max} = 5.71^{m}, V_{min} = 5.97^{m}
HD 43429				43429	29692	06^{h} 15^{m} 17.71^{s}	−18° 28′ 37.2″	5.99	1.96	208	K1III	
OS CMa			OS	54764	34561	07^{h} 09^{m} 33.37^{s}	−16° 14′ 04.2″	6.00			B1Ib/II	α Cyg variable
HR 2800			HQ	57593	35611	07^{h} 20^{m} 54.92^{s}	−26° 57′ 49.9″	6.00	−2.71	1801	B3V	Algol variable, V_{max} = 5.99^{m}, V_{min} = 6.25^{m}, P = 24.6033 d
HD 47561				47561	31758	06^{h} 38^{m} 35.43^{s}	−16° 52′ 24.6″	6.01	0.26	460	A0IV	
HD 56578				56578	35213	07^{h} 16^{m} 38.38^{s}	−23° 18′ 39.8″	6.02	1.53	258	A5m...	
HD 44021				44021	29993	06^{h} 18^{m} 48.79^{s}	−15° 01′ 30.0″	6.04	−0.73	738	M1III:	suspected variable, V_{max} = 5.96^{m}, V_{min} = 6.06^{m}
HD 49001				49001	32368	06^{h} 45^{m} 23.38^{s}	−23° 27′ 45.0″	6.04	0.15	492	K2III	
HD 58585				58585	36017	07^{h} 25^{m} 19.98^{s}	−21° 58′ 57.4″	6.04	−3.90	3165	A6II	
HD 43745				43745	29843	06^{h} 17^{m} 03.52^{s}	−22° 42′ 52.6″	6.05	3.04	130	F8/G0V	
HD 45588				45588	30711	06^{h} 27^{m} 11.48^{s}	−25° 51′ 21.5″	6.05	3.67	97	F8/G0V	
HD 47827				47827	31859	06^{h} 39^{m} 36.22^{s}	−23° 41′ 44.3″	6.05	−0.32	614	A0V	
HD 50806				50806	33094	06^{h} 53^{m} 33.76^{s}	−28° 32′ 19.4″	6.05	3.99	84	G3/G5V	
HD 57118				57118	35442	07^{h} 19^{m} 01.92^{s}	−19° 16′ 49.1″	6.11			F2Ia	suspected variable, V_{max} = 6.08^{m}, V_{min} = 6.11^{m}
12 CMa		12	HK	49333	32504	06^{h} 47^{m} 01.49^{s}	−21° 00′ 55.5″	6.07	−0.49	668	B7II/III	α^{2} CVn variable
HD 53629				53629	34142	07^{h} 04^{m} 47.04^{s}	−22° 01′ 53.8″	6.09	1.07	330	K2IIICN...	
HD 54173				54173	34318	07^{h} 06^{m} 52.48^{s}	−24° 57′ 38.1″	6.09	−1.28	970	K2III	variable star, ΔV = 0.005^{m}, P = 17.08526 d
HD 55568				55568	34782	07^{h} 12^{m} 04.12^{s}	−30° 49′ 17.1″	6.10	2.71	155	A8III/IV	
HD 47366				47366	31674	06^{h} 37^{m} 40.79^{s}	−12° 59′ 05.3″	6.11	1.46	277	K1III:	has two planets (b & c)
HD 44996				44996	30468	06^{h} 24^{m} 20.58^{s}	−12° 57′ 43.0″	6.12	−2.73	1918	B4V	suspected variable
GY CMa			GY	55857	34924	07^{h} 13^{m} 36.45^{s}	−27° 21′ 22.9″	6.12	−4.88	5175	B2II	β Cep variable, ΔV = 0.04^{m}, P = 0.112 d
HD 50643				50643	33079	06^{h} 53^{m} 21.85^{s}	−18° 55′ 58.5″	6.13	0.39	458	A3III	
HD 46064				46064	31024	06^{h} 30^{m} 34.89^{s}	−13° 08′ 53.4″	6.16	−1.57	1148	B2III	suspected variable
HD 58346				58346	35920	07^{h} 24^{m} 17.24^{s}	−22° 54′ 46.0″	6.20	−0.31	652	B8/B9V	
HD 51823				51823	33492	06^{h} 57^{m} 42.64^{s}	−27° 32′ 15.1″	6.22	−1.25	1019	B2/B3V	suspected variable
HD 50853				50853	33126	06^{h} 53^{m} 55.46^{s}	−24° 32′ 19.5″	6.23	0.43	472	A0V	
HD 54958				54958	34617	07^{h} 10^{m} 09.36^{s}	−18° 41′ 08.1″	6.23	2.74	162	F3V	
HD 58439				58439	35975	07^{h} 24^{m} 50.88^{s}	−19° 00′ 44.2″	6.24	−2.45	1781	A2Ib/II	suspected variable
HD 48501			V350	48501	32144	06^{h} 42^{m} 46.08^{s}	−22° 26′ 55.8″	6.26	2.81	159	F2V	γ Dor variable, V_{max} = 6.18^{m}, V_{min} = 6.27^{m}, P = 0.91401 d
HD 52273				52273	33666	06^{h} 59^{m} 39.26^{s}	−21° 36′ 10.4″	6.26	−1.90	1399	B2III	
HD 44891				44891	30420	06^{h} 23^{m} 46.14^{s}	−15° 04′ 16.5″	6.27	−2.15	1575	K2/K3III	
HD 52619				52619	33760	07^{h} 00^{m} 42.53^{s}	−28° 29′ 22.1″	6.28	2.11	222	F3/F5V	
HD 44225				44225	30062	06^{h} 19^{m} 38.19^{s}	−22° 06′ 11.3″	6.29	−0.61	784	K3III	suspected variable
HD 46407			HR	46407	31205	06^{h} 32^{m} 46.88^{s}	−11° 09′ 59.0″	6.30	0.88	395	K0III:...	Algol variable, V_{max} = 6.24^{m}, V_{min} = 6.32^{m}
HD 56731				56731	35241	07^{h} 16^{m} 57.22^{s}	−30° 53′ 49.0″	6.30	0.46	481	A9II	
HD 44956				44956	30376	06^{h} 23^{m} 14.50^{s}	−31° 47′ 25.1″	6.31	1.27	332	G8III	
KM CMa			KM	46347	31086	06^{h} 31^{m} 24.01^{s}	−32° 52′ 06.8″	6.31	−1.10	988	M4III	semiregular variable
HD 49891				49891	32744	06^{h} 49^{m} 44.00^{s}	−24° 04′ 33.7″	6.31	0.04	584	A0/A1V	
HD 44394				44394	30190	06^{h} 21^{m} 05.43^{s}	−11° 49′ 02.4″	6.32	−1.70	1309	K5	
HD 45420				45420	30669	06^{h} 26^{m} 42.66^{s}	−14° 36′ 12.2″	6.32	0.14	560	K0/K1III	
HD 47012				47012	31469	06^{h} 35^{m} 30.81^{s}	−22° 06′ 32.4″	6.32	0.33	513	K0III	
HD 50093				50093	32827	06^{h} 50^{m} 36.96^{s}	−25° 46′ 42.3″	6.32	−1.52	1203	B2III/IV	
HD 52348				52348	33703	07^{h} 00^{m} 08.29^{s}	−20° 09′ 30.4″	6.32	−1.50	1194	B3V	
HD 55985				55985	34954	07^{h} 13^{m} 57.34^{s}	−30° 20′ 23.3″	6.32	−1.92	1449	B2III	suspected variable
HD 58766				58766	36045	07^{h} 25^{m} 42.99^{s}	−31° 44′ 19.4″	6.32	−1.09	988	B2/B3III	suspected variable
KX CMa			KX	50648	33040	06^{h} 53^{m} 00.31^{s}	−26° 57′ 26.9″	6.33	−0.70	830	M6III	semiregular variable
HR 2680			IL	54031	34248	07^{h} 06^{m} 00.49^{s}	−30° 39′ 20.6″	6.34	−0.69	830	B3V	Algol and 53 Per variable, V_{max} = 6.32^{m}, V_{min} = 6.54^{m}, P = 8.09858 d
HD 55856				55856	34940	07^{h} 13^{m} 48.39^{s}	−22° 54′ 20.8″	6.34	−2.08	1575	B2IV	suspected variable
HD 56341				56341	35132	07^{h} 15^{m} 47.30^{s}	−23° 44′ 25.1″	6.34	−0.89	911	A0V	
V415 CMa			V415	47247	31593	06^{h} 36^{m} 41.07^{s}	−22° 36′ 53.1″	6.35	−0.46	751	B3V	Algol variable, V_{max} = 6.34^{m}, V_{min} = 6.48^{m}, P = 1.98571 d
HD 51411				51411	33330	06^{h} 55^{m} 54.78^{s}	−31° 47′ 24.7″	6.36	−1.83	1417	B3V	Be star, ΔV = 0.015^{m}
HD 51925				51925	33532	06^{h} 58^{m} 07.56^{s}	−27° 09′ 51.8″	6.36	−1.89	1455	B2V	suspected variable
V352 CMa			V352	43162	29568	06^{h} 13^{m} 45.33^{s}	−23° 51′ 43.9″	6.37	5.26	54	G5V	BY Dra variable, V_{max} = 6.35^{m}, V_{min} = 6.40^{m}, P = 7.2 d
HD 45184				45184	30503	06^{h} 24^{m} 43.99^{s}	−28° 46′ 47.3″	6.37	4.65	72	G2V	has a planet (b)
HD 46602				46602	31266	06^{h} 33^{m} 26.68^{s}	−20° 55′ 26.0″	6.39	1.12	368	K0III+...	
HD 52140				52140	33591	06^{h} 58^{m} 43.70^{s}	−30° 59′ 53.0″	6.41	−0.46	771	B3V	
HD 48938				48938	32322	06^{h} 44^{m} 51.96^{s}	−27° 20′ 32.6″	6.43	4.31	87	F7V	
HD 46037				46037	30988	06^{h} 30^{m} 11.81^{s}	−19° 12′ 53.4″	6.44	−1.49	1259	M0/M1III	suspected variable
HD 56876				56876	35326	07^{h} 17^{m} 48.01^{s}	−26° 47′ 51.2″	6.45	−0.80	921	B5Vn	
HD 47579				47579	31736	06^{h} 38^{m} 22.91^{s}	−23° 34′ 49.1″	6.48	−0.07	667	A2V	
HD 53975				53975	34297	07^{h} 06^{m} 35.97^{s}	−12° 23′ 38.2″	6.48	−4.42	4939	B7Iab...	
HD 44379				44379	30141	06^{h} 20^{m} 35.17^{s}	−23° 38′ 16.1″	6.49	0.03	639	K0III	
HD 42927			IP	42927	29488	06^{h} 12^{m} 46.33^{s}	−17° 45′ 47.6″	6.49		908	B5II/III	rotating ellipsoidal variable, V_{max} = 6.50^{m}, V_{min} = 6.54^{m}, P = 5.0946 d
FU CMa			FU	52437	33721	07^{h} 00^{m} 19.36^{s}	−22° 07′ 08.6″	6.51		2100	B3Vnn	γ Cas variable, V_{max} = 6.48^{m}, V_{min} = 6.6^{m}
W CMa			W	54361	34413	07^{h} 08^{m} 03.44^{s}	−11° 55′ 23.8″	6.56		8400	C	semiregular variable, V_{max} = 6.27^{m}, V_{min} = 7.09^{m}, P = 160 d
GU CMa			GU	52721	33868	07^{h} 01^{m} 49.51^{s}	−11° 18′ 03.3″	6.59		1450	B2Vne	β Lyr variable, V_{max} = 6.49^{m}, V_{min} = 6.72^{m}, P = 1.610137 d
HR 2724			HN	55595	34814	07^{h} 12^{m} 24.18^{s}	−27° 28′ 29.1″	6.61		805	A5IV-V	δ Sct variable, ΔV = 0.025^{m}
EZ CMa			EZ	50896	33165	06^{h} 54^{m} 13.04^{s}	−23° 55′ 42.0″	6.91		4500	WN4-s	Wolf–Rayet star, V_{max} = 6.71^{m}, V_{min} = 6.95^{m}, P = 3.763 d
HD 47186				47186	31540	06^{h} 36^{m} 08.79^{s}	−27° 37′ 20.3″	7.8	4.9	123	G6V	has two planets (b & c)
VY CMa			VY	58061	35793	07^{h} 22^{m} 58.29^{s}	−25° 46′ 03.5″	7.95	−9.4	3900	M2.5–M5e Ia	One of the largest known stars; semiregular variable or irregular variable, V_{max} = 6.5^{m}, V_{min} = 9.6^{m}
GZ CMa			GZ	56429	35187	07^{h} 16^{m} 09.21^{s}	−16° 43′ 00.1″	7.97		1290	A0III/IV	Algol variable, V_{max} = 7.97^{m}, V_{min} = 8.51^{m}, P = 4.80085 d
HD 45364				45364	30579	06^{h} 25^{m} 38.48^{s}	−31° 28′ 51.4″	8.07	5.50	106	G8V	has two planets (b & c)
FZ CMa			FZ	52942	33953	07^{h} 02^{m} 42.61^{s}	−11° 27′ 11.6″	8.14		1350	B2IVn	Algol variable, V_{max} = 8.05^{m}, V_{min} = 8.44^{m}, P = 1.27306 d
HD 45677			FS	45677	30800	06^{h} 28^{m} 17.42^{s}	−13° 03′ 11.1″	8.50		908	Bpshe	prototype FS CMa variable, V_{max} = 7.35^{m}, V_{min} = 8.58^{m}
Z CMa			Z	53179	34042	07^{h} 03^{m} 43.16^{s}	−11° 33′ 06.2″	8.80		2630	Bpe	EXor and FU Ori variable, V_{max} = 8.2^{m}, V_{min} = 10.6^{m}
HD 43197				43197	29550	06^{h} 13^{m} 35.66^{s}	−29° 53′ 50.2″	8.95	5.25	179	G9IV-V	Amadioha, has a planet (b)
SW CMa			SW	54520	34431	07^{h} 08^{m} 15.24^{s}	−22° 26′ 25.3″	9.16		2230	A3IV	Algol variable, V_{max} = 9.15^{m}, V_{min} = 9.68^{m}, P = 10.091988 d
WASP-101						06^{h} 33^{m} 24.0^{s}	−23° 29′ 10″	10.3			F6	has a transiting planet (b)
HD 56925				56925	35378	07^{h} 18^{m} 29.13^{s}	−13° 13′ 01.5″	11.40		3700	WN4-s	Wolf–Rayet star at center of NGC 2359
DZ CMa			DZ			07^{h} 16^{m} 59.33^{s}	−15° 18′ 25.4″	11.6			G0	double-mode Cepheid variable, V_{max} = 11.6^{m}, V_{min} = 12.4^{m}, P = 2.311 d
HATS-4						06^{h} 16^{m} 27.0^{s}	−21° 27′ 11″	13.5		1370		has a planet (b)
EUVE J0720-317			IN			07^{h} 20^{m} 47.91^{s}	−31° 47′ 02.7″	14.64			DA.9	re-radiating binary system, V_{max} = 14.64^{m}, V_{min} = 14.89^{m}, P = 1.262396 d
RX J0720.4-3125						07^{h} 20^{m} 24.96^{s}	−31° 25′ 50.2″	26.6		1174		one of the nearest neutron stars
PSR B0628-28						06^{h} 30^{m} 49.48^{s}	−28° 34′ 43.1″					pulsar
CX CMa						07^{h} 22^{m} 00.9896^{s}	−25° 52′ 35.912″	9.6		6000-7000	B5V	eclipsing binary, V_{max} = 9.9^{m}, V_{min} = 10.6^{m}, P = 0.954625 d
NN CMa			NN	58011	35769	07^{h} 22^{m} 43.32^{s}	−26° 00′ 40.9″	7.19	-12.85	3397	B1/B2Ib/IIn	
Table legend: • Name = Proper name • B = Bayer designation • F or/and G. = Flamsteed designation or Gould designation • Var = Variable-star designation • HD = Henry Draper Catalogue designation number • HIP = Hipparcos Catalogue designation number • RA = Right ascension for the Epoch/Equinox J2000.0 • Dec = Declination for the Epoch/Equinox J2000.0 • vis. mag. = visual magnitude (m or m_{v}), also known as apparent magnitude • abs. mag. = absolute magnitude (M_{v}) • Dist. (ly) = Distance in light-years from Earth • Sp. class = Spectral class of the star in the stellar classification system • Notes = Common name(s) or alternate name(s); comments; notable properties [for example: multiple star status, range of variability if it is a variable star, exoplanets, etc.]

== See also ==
- Lists of stars by constellation
