= List of nearest massive stars =

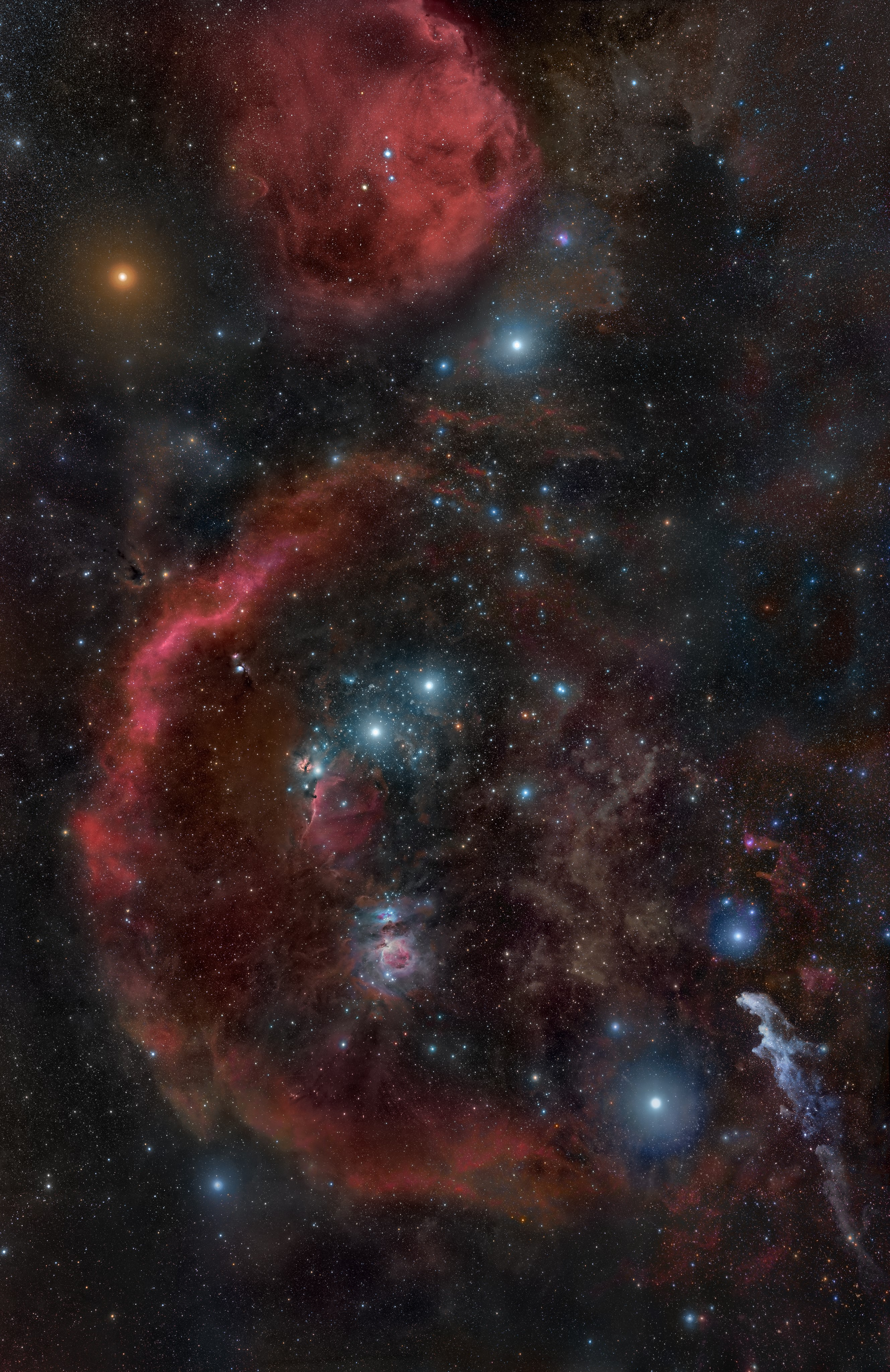
The constellation Orion containing many nearby massive stars from Earth

This is a list of nearest massive stars from Earth. The distance covered in this list is around 2,500 light-years from Earth. WR 147 with a mass of 51 M_{☉} is the most massive star within 2,500 light-years followed by 68 Cygni with a mass of 36+14
−10 M_{☉} and other nearby massive stars. The minimum mass is between 8 to 10 M_{☉} needed for a star to be a supernova candidate.

== Table ==
| Name | Distance (ly) | Spectral type | Stellar mass (M_{☉}) | Stellar radius (R_{☉}) | Stellar luminosity (L_{☉}) | Apparent magnitude (V) | Notes and References |
|---|---|---|---|---|---|---|---|
| WR 147 A | 2,100±200 | WN8h | 51 | 29.8 | 1,995,000 | 13.86 | |
| 68 Cygni | 2,200 ± 200 | O7.5IIIn((f)) | 36+14 −10 | 15.7+2.3 −2.0 | 316000+110000 −82000 | 5.00 | |
| Meissa A | 1,300 | O9 III((f)) | 34 | 10.0±0.6 | 200000+117000 −74000 | 3.7 | |
| Alnitak Aa | 1,260 ± 180 | O9.5Iab | 33±10 | 20.0±3.2 | 250,000 | 1.77 | |
| Theta^{1} Orionis C_{1} | 1340±65 | O6Vp | 33±5 | 10.6±1.5 | 204,000 | 5.13 | |
| S Monocerotis Aa | 920+150 −110 | O7V((f))zvar | 29.1 | 9.9 | 214,000 | 4.66 | |
| Theta^{2} Orionis A | 1,100 ± 80 | O9.5IVp | 29 | 8.2 | 85,114 | 5.02 | |
| Gamma^{2} Velorum B | 1096+26 −23 | O7.5III | 28.5±1.1 | 16.2 | 363,000 | 1.83 | |
| Alnilam | 1,250±26 | B0 Ia | 28.4±2.0 | 33.6±1.8 | 271,000±38,000 | 1.69 | |
| HD 206267 Aa1 | 2,000 | O6V((f)) | 27.8 | 11.7 | 347,000 | 5.70 | |
| Xi Persei (Menkib) | 1,200 | O7.5III(n)((f)) | 26-36 | 14 | 263,000 | 4.04 | |
| Zeta Puppis (Naos) | 1,080 ± 40 | O4If(n)p | 25.3±5.3 | 13.72±0.49 (equatorial) or 11.25±0.19 (polar) | 376000+21000 −20000 | 2.24 - 2.26 | |
| Iota Orionis (Hatysa Aa1) | 1340+46 −42 | O9 III | 23.18+0.57 −0.53 | 9.10+0.12 −0.10 | 68,000 | 2.77 | |
| 10 Lacertae | 1,800±100 | O9V | 21.6±0.5 | 7.4±0.5 | 69,200+8,440 −7,520 | 4.880 | |
| Rigel A | 848 ± 65 | B8 Ia | 21±3 | 74.1+6.1 −7.3 | 120000+25000 −21000 | 0.13 to 0.12 | |

=== Stars within 20 M_{☉} ===
| Name | Distance (ly) | Spectral type | Stellar mass (M_{☉}) | Stellar radius (R_{☉}) | Stellar luminosity (L_{☉}) | Apparent magnitude (V) | Notes and References |
|---|---|---|---|---|---|---|---|
| S Monocerotis Ab | 920+150 −110 | O9.5Vn | 19.7 | | | 5.90 | |
| AE Aurigae | 1,270 ± 20 | O9.5V | 19.2±0.3 | 6.8±0.5 | 50100+4800 −4400 | 5.96 | |
| Mu Columbae | 1,890±110 | O9.5 V | 18.9±0.3 | 6.3±0.4 | 43650+4210 −3840 | 5.18 | |
| Zeta Ophiuchi | 440 ± 40 | O9.5 V | 18.7±0.7 | 9.1 (equator) or 7.5 (polar) | 49000+9900 −8200 | 2.56 – 2.58 | |
| Sigma Orionis Aa | 1263±4.3 | O9.5V | 18 | 5.6 | 41,700 | 4.07 | |
| Mintaka Aa1 | 1,200 | O9.5II | 17.8 | 13.1 | 190,000 | 2.23 | |
| HD 206267 Aa2 | 2,000 | O9V | 17.7 | 5.9 | 50,119 | 5.70 | |
| Upsilon Orionis | 1,260±75 | B0V or O9.7V | 17.5±0.5 | 5.5±0.3 | 32360+2310 −2160 | 4.618±0.013 | |
| Acrux Aa | 320 ± 20 | B0.5IV | 17.2±1.2 | 6.8 | 31110+3190 −2910 | 1.33 | |
| NU Orionis Aa | 1,360 ± 30 | B0.5V | 16.4±0.4 | 5.7±0.3 | 26,900 | 6.80–6.93 | |
| Theta^{1} Orionis D1 | 1,430 ± 10 | B1.5 Vp | 16±1 | 5.6±0.8 | 29,500 | 6.70 | |
| Saiph | 650 ± 30 | B0.5 Ia | 15.5±1.25 or 21.1 | 13–14 | 60300+10500 −9000 | 2.09 | |
| Deneb | 1,410±196 or 2,615±215 | A2 Ia | 15.5±0.8 or 19±4 | 117+14 −19 or 203±17 | 55,100±10,000 or 196,000±32,000 | 1.25 | |
| Theta^{1} Orionis A1 | 1,240 ± 50 | B0.5V | 15.01±0.32 | 4.20±0.05 | 15800+3200 −2700 | 6.72 - 7.65 | |
| Gamma Cassiopeiae Aa | 550 ± 10 | B0.5IVe | 15±2 | 10.9+0.8 −0.6 (equatorial) or 7.9±0.4 (polar) | 19,000±500 | 2.39 | |
| Beta Scorpii (Acrab Aa) | 400 ± 40 | B0.5IV-V | 15.0 | 6.3 | 31,600 | 2.62 | |
| Theta Carinae | 460 ± 10 | B0.5 Vp | 14.9±0.4 | 5.1 | 14,500±1,000 | 2.76 | |
| Theta^{2} Orionis B | 1,370 ± 30 | B0.7V | 14.8 | 4.3 | 12,300 | 6.380 | |
| Zeta Persei | 1,300±200 | B1 Ib | 14.5 ± 1.9 | 26–27 | 47,039 | 2.86 | |
| Mimosa A | 280 ± 20 | B0.5 III | 14.5±0.5 | 7.3–8.9 | 25700+4500 −3830 | 1.25 | |
| 119 Tauri | 1,800 | M2Iab-Ib | 14.37+2.00 −2.77 | 587 - 593 | 66,000 | 4.23 - 4.54 | |
| V Puppis A | 1,400 ± 100 | B1Vp | 14.0±0.5 | 5.48±0.18 | 12,600±2,100 | 4.41 | |
| Alnitak Ab | 1,260 ± 180 | B1IV | 14±3 | 7.3±1.0 | 32,000 | 1.77 | |
| Betelgeuse | 408 – 548+90 −49 | M1–M2 Ia–ab | 14 | ~640 – 764+116 −62 | ~65,000 – 87100+20500 −11200 | 0.50 | |
| Sigma Orionis B | 1263±4.3 | B0.5V | 14 | 5.0 | 15,800 | 5.27 | |
| Gamma^{1} Velorum | 1,250 ± 60 | B2III | 14 | 9.61±0.39 | 13,122 | 4.27 | |
| Epsilon Persei | 640 ± 30 | B0.5III | 13.5±2.0 | 7.66 | 28,330 | 2.88 | |
| Iota Orionis (Hatysa Aa2) | 1340+46 −42 | B0.8 III/IV | 13.44±0.30 | 4.94+0.16 −0.23 | 8,630 | 2.77 | |
| Epsilon Canis Majoris (Adhara A) | 405 ± 7 | B2 II or B2 III-II | 13.1±2.3 | 10.7±0.7 | 19,900±1,600 or 22400+2700 −2400 | 1.50 | |
| Beta Canis Majoris (Mirzam) | 490 ± 20 | B1 II-III | 13±1 | 8.44±0.56 | 25700+3800 −3300 | 1.985 | |
| Antares A | 550 | M1.5Iab-Ib | 13 or 15–16 | 680 (varies by 19%) | 75900+53000 −31200 | 0.6–1.6 | |
| Delta Scorpii (Dschubba) | 470 | B0.3 IV | 13 | 8.5 | 38,000 | 1.59 - 2.32 | |
| Acrux B | 320 ± 20 | B1Vn | 12.4 | 5.4 | 14,000 | 1.75 | |
| Beta Centauri (Hader Aa) | 361 ± 2 | B1 III | 12.02±0.13 | 9.16 | 31600+18500 −11700 | 0.61 | |
| Eta Centauri | 306 ± 6 | B1.5 Vne | 12.0±0.3 | 6.10±0.12 | 8,700 | 2.35 | |
| Theta^{1} Orionis C2 | 1340±65 | B0V | 12±3 | 8.24±0.50 | 50000+21000 −15000 | 5.13 | |
| Pi Puppis (Ahadi) | 810 ± 70 | K3 Ib | 11.7±0.2 | 235 | 11,378 | 2.69 – 2.76 | |
| Spica A | 250 ± 10 | B1III-IV | 11.43±1.15 | 7.47±0.54 | 20500+5000 −4000 | 0.97 | |
| Zeta Tauri A | 440 | B2 IIIpe | 11.2 | 5.5 | 4,169 | 3.010 | |
| Mu Cephei | 2,090 – 3,060 | M2-Ia (M2e Ia or M2 Ia+) | 11 | 762 | 110,000 | 3.43–5.1 | |
| FR Canis Majoris | 1,750 ± 60 | B1.5IVe | 10.7 | 7.9 | 11,194 | 5.43 - 5.64 | |
| Beta Centauri Ab (Hader) | 361 ± 2 | B1 III | 10.58±0.18 | 8.56 | 25100+14700 −9300 | 0.61 | |
| 25 Orionis | 1,110 ± 50 | B1Vn | 10.5 | 6.4 | 10,500 | 4.92 - 4.96 | |
| Beta Scorpii (Acrab Ab) | 400 ± 40 | B1.5V | 10.4 | 4.0 | 7,900 | 2.62 | |
| Lambda Scorpii (Shaula Aa1) | 570 | B1.5IV | 10.4 | 8.8±1.2 | 36,300 | 1.63 | |
| Meissa B | 1,320 ± 80 | B0 V | 10.3±0.7 | 4.2±0.8 | 6,300 | 5.6 | |
| Kappa Scorpii (Girtab) | 480 ± 10 | B1.5 III | 10.2±0.3 | 6.45±0.55 | | 2.41 - 2.42 | |
| Alpha Lupi (Uridim) | 460 ± 10 | B1.5 III | 10.1±1.0 | 7.46 ± 0.17 | 18200+860 −820 | 2.30 | |
| Zeta Cephei | 992.7+51.2 −46 | K1.5 Ib | 10.1±0.1 | 171.55±7.40 | 10,024±1,052 | 3.35 | |
| Canopus | 310 ± 20 | A9II | 9.26±1.40 or 9.81±1.83 | 73.3±5.2 | 16600+700 −680 | −0.74 | |
| Rho Ophiuchi | 451±12 | B2/3V | 9.21±0.79 | 4.2±0.3 | 4270+980 −800 | 4.63 | |
| Mintaka Ab | 1,200 | B0IV | 8.787 | 12.045 | 63,000 | 2.23 | |
| Mintaka Aa2 | 1,200 | B1V | 8.518 | 4.168 | 16,000 | 2.23 | |
| Bellatrix | 250 ± 10 | B2III or B2V | 8.4 | 6.2 | 7,410 | 1.64 | |
| Sigma Orionis E | 1263±4.3 | B2 Vpe | 8.30 | 3.77 | 3,162 | 6.61 - 6.77 | |
| Gamma^{2} Velorum A | 1096+26 −23 | WC8 | 8.3±0.7 | 3.4±0.5 | 110,000±40,000 | 1.83 | |
| Epsilon Centauri | 430 ± 30 | B1 III | 8.2 | 5.8 | 16,137 | 2.29 - 2.31 | |
| Beta² Scorpii (Acrab) | 400 | B2V | 8.2 | 2.9 | 3,200 | 4.92 | |

== See also ==
- Lists of stars
- List of most massive stars
- List of supernova candidates
