= Theta Columbae =

Star in the constellation Columba

θ Columbae (Elkurud)
- Location of θ Columbae (circled in red)

Observation data Epoch J2000.0 Equinox J2000.0 (ICRS)
- Constellation: Columba
- Right ascension: 06^{h} 07^{m} 31.633^{s}
- Declination: −37° 15′ 10.51″
- Apparent magnitude (V): 5.02

Characteristics
- Spectral type: B8 IV
- B−V color index: −0.11

Astrometry
| Radial velocity (R_{v}) | +45.3±1.8 km/s |
| Proper motion (μ) | RA: +0.391 mas/yr Dec.: +0.121 mas/yr |
| Parallax (π) | 4.1731±0.0694 mas |
| Distance | 780 ± 10 ly (240 ± 4 pc) |
| Absolute magnitude (M_{V}) | −1.72 |

Details
| Mass | 4.13±0.09 M_{☉} |
| Luminosity | 472 L_{☉} |
| Temperature | 9,916 K |
| Rotational velocity (v sin i) | 249 km/s |
| Age | 237 Myr |

Other designations
- Elkurud, θ Col, CD−37°2609, FK5 2468, HD 42167, HIP 29034, HR 2177, SAO 196514

Database references
| SIMBAD | data |

Theta Columbae is a solitary star in the southern constellation of Columba. It has the proper name Elkurud /ˈɛlkərʌd/; Theta Columbae is its Bayer designation. This star is faintly visible to the naked eye, having an apparent visual magnitude of 5.02. Based upon parallax measurements, it is approximately 780 light-years (240 pc) distant from the Sun. At its present distance, the visual magnitude of the star is reduced by an interstellar extinction factor of 0.11. It is currently moving away from the Sun with a radial velocity of 45.3 km/s. The star made its closest approach about 4.7 million years ago when it underwent perihelion passage at a distance of 10.9 ly (3.33 pc).

This is an evolving B-type subgiant star with a stellar classification of B8 IV, having recently left the main sequence. It is spinning rapidly with a projected rotational velocity of 249 km/s. The star has an estimated four times the mass of the Sun. It radiates 472 times the solar luminosity from its outer atmosphere at an effective temperature of 9,916 K.

== Nomenclature ==
θ Columbae, Latinised to Theta Columbae, is the star's Bayer designation, which are abbreviated θ Col or Theta Col.

Early Arab poets referred to a number of anonymous stars as الفرود al-furūd, "the solitary ones". Later Arabian astronomers attempted to identify this name with particular stars, principally in the modern constellations Centaurus and Colomba. Allen (1899) noted the accepted etymology but suggested that al-furūd might have been an old transcriber's error for القرود al-qurūd "the apes", which he rendered "Al Ḳurūd", though this suggested has not received scholarly support.

In 2016, the IAU organized a Working Group on Star Names (WGSN) to catalog and standardize proper names for stars. The WGSN approved the name Elkurud for this star on 1 June 2018, and it is now so included in the List of IAU-approved Star Names. (The historical form Furud was chosen for Zeta Canis Majoris.)

In Chinese, 孫 (Sūn), meaning Grandson, refers to an asterism consisting of Theta Columbae and Kappa Columbae. Consequently, Theta Columbae itself is known as 孫二 (Sūn èr, English: the Second Star of Grandson).
