= HD 6226 =

Star in the constellation Andromeda

Observation data Epoch J2000.0 Equinox ICRS
- Constellation: Andromeda
- Right ascension: 01^{h} 03^{m} 53.358^{s}
- Declination: +47° 38′ 32.26″
- Apparent magnitude (V): 6.63 to 6.86

Characteristics
- Evolutionary stage: late main sequence
- Spectral type: B2.5 IIIe
- B−V color index: −0.055±0.009
- Variable type: SPB

Astrometry
Radial velocity (R_{v})	−55.0±4.4 km/s
Proper motion (μ)	RA: −5.688 mas/yr Dec.: −3.048 mas/yr
Parallax (π)	0.8153±0.0369 mas
Distance	4,000 ± 200 ly (1,230 ± 60 pc)

Details
Mass	7.05^{+0.75}_{−0.31} M_{☉}
Radius	7.4^{+1.3}_{−1.1} (equatorial); 5.83 (polar) R_{☉}
Luminosity	3,800 L_{☉}
Surface gravity (log g)	3.55^{+0.18}_{−0.17} cgs
Temperature	17,000 K
Rotation	2.61507±0.00013 days
Rotational velocity (v sin i)	70 km/s
Age	51 Myr

Other designations
- V442 And, BD+46°245, GC 1271, HD 6226, HIP 4983, SAO 36891, PPM 43594

Database references
SIMBAD	data

HD 6226 is a star in the northern constellation of Andromeda. It has the variable star designation V442 And; HD 6226 is its designation from the Henry Draper Catalogue. With an apparent visual magnitude of about 6.8, it is considered below the brightness level needed to be readily visible to the naked eye. Based on a parallax shift of 0.8153 mas, it is located at a distance of approximately 4,000 light years.

== Observations ==
Early spectral studies provided classifications of B2IV-V or B3III for HD 6226, indicating it is a normal B-type star. Photometric observations between 1982 and 1990 suggested that this star may instead be variable. It displayed occasional brightenings that suggested it may be a Be star, showing emission lines in its spectrum from a decreted disk of circumstellar matter. Potential periodicity of these variations could not be confirmed, although a period of 481 days seemed to fit the early data. Radial velocity measurements also appeared to vary. Follow-up observations showed a correlation between the brightness of the star and the strength of the emission lines, confirming that it is a Be star. Its behavior appeared similar to that of Omega Canis Majoris.

Over a period of years, this star was found to cycle between a B and Be state. It displays a relatively low projected rotational velocity of 70 km/s for a Be star, suggesting it is being viewed from close to pole-on. The helium and metallic absorption lines in the spectrum show a strict periodicity of 2.61507 d, which may be its rotation period. This periodicity is not visible in the H-alpha line. Periods of stronger emission lines occur on a roughly 630 day cycle. On August 14, 2017, the H-alpha line of this star showed a significant increase in intensity, followed by drastic changes on the nights that followed.

HD 6226 is a slowly pulsating B-type star with photometric periods of 1.39 and 1.41 days. Coupling of these periods (and possibly others) may explain the quasi-periodic behavior of the intermittent outbursts. The H-alpha emission varies with periods of 212 and 87 days. The stellar classification is B2.5IIIe, based on its similarity to π^{2} Cygni. The ratio of the equatorial radius to the polar radius is 1.27, giving it a pronounced equatorial bulge. Its pole is inclined at an angle of around 13.4° to the line of sight.

This is a runaway star located well outside the plane of the galaxy, although its radial velocity indicates it is on its way back. It may have been spun up via accretion prior to being ejected from its original star system, in which case its estimated age of 51 Myr is likely the time since the mass transfer was completed.
