= Gould designation =

Type of star identifier

Gould designations for stars are similar to Flamsteed designations in the way that they number stars within a constellation in increasing order of right ascension. Each star is assigned an integer (starting at 1), followed by "G." (or occasionally followed directly by a "G" without a space), and then the Latin genitive of the constellation it lies in. See 88 modern constellations for a list of constellations and the genitive forms of their names.

They were assigned according to the stars' positions in epoch 1875.0, and over time are affected by precession of the equinoxes. Due to the star's proper motions, some stars may now occur out of order.

Gould designations first appeared in Uranometria Argentina, a catalogue published in 1879 by Benjamin Apthorp Gould. Many of these designations have fallen out of use, though for many relatively bright southern stars (which are too far south to bear Flamsteed designations), Gould numbers remain the only simple designations available without referring to cumbersome catalogue numbers.

== List of constellations with Gould star designations ==
Gould's catalogue includes 66 constellations (some of which are also covered partially or fully by Flamsteed numbers):

=== 33 constellations that contain both Flamsteed and Gould numbers ===
- Aquarius
- Aquila
- Boötes
- Cancer
- Canis Major
- Canis Minor
- Capricornus
- Centaurus
- Cetus
- Corvus
- Crater
- Delphinus
- Equuleus
- Eridanus
- Hercules
- Hydra
- Leo
- Lepus
- Libra
- Lupus
- Monoceros
- Ophiuchus
- Orion
- Pegasus
- Pisces
- Piscis Austrinus
- Puppis
- Sagittarius
- Scorpius
- Serpens
- Sextans
- Taurus
- Virgo

=== 33 constellations that contain only Gould numbers ===
- Antlia
- Apus
- Ara
- Caelum
- Carina
- Chamaeleon
- Circinus
- Columba
- Corona Australis
- Crux
- Dorado^{†}
- Fornax
- Grus
- Horologium
- Hydrus
- Indus
- Mensa
- Microscopium
- Musca
- Norma
- Octans
- Pavo
- Phoenix
- Pictor
- Pyxis
- Reticulum
- Sculptor
- Scutum
- Telescopium
- Triangulum Australe
- Tucana^{†}
- Vela
- Volans

† 30 Doradus and 47 Tucanae are Bode numbers, not Gould designations.

== Stars known primarily by Gould designations ==
Many of these were listed in the cross-index by Kostjuk, with their Gould numbers supplied as their supposed Flamsteed number. From this cross-index, the designations found their way into other sources, including SIMBAD. Many stars commonly known by their Gould designations are nearby stars.

- 41 G. Arae
- 145 G. Canis Majoris
- 23 G. Carinae
- 72 G. Columbae
- 35 G. Crucis
- 39 G. Crucis
- 82 G. Eridani
- 33 G. Librae
- 31 G. Mensae
- 67 G. Muscae
- 120 G. Phoenicis
- 61 G. Pictoris
- 96 G. Piscium
- 140 G. Puppis
- 212 G. Puppis
- 188 G. Puppis
- 171 G. Puppis
- 16 G. Velorum

== See also ==
- Bayer designation
- Lists of constellations
- Stellar designation

Additional designations were heavily dropped and forgotten, i.e. Kapteyn's Star was originally called C.Z. V 243 by Gould himself, But these designations are extremely rare to find outside of that aforementioned article.
