= HD 122430 =

Star in the constellation Hydra

Observation data Epoch J2000 Equinox ICRS
- Constellation: Hydra
- Right ascension: 14^{h} 02^{m} 22.78173^{s}
- Declination: −27° 25′ 47.1992″
- Apparent magnitude (V): 5.47

Characteristics
- Spectral type: K2–3III
- B−V color index: 1.331±0.003

Astrometry
Radial velocity (R_{v})	−0.61±0.24 km/s
Proper motion (μ)	RA: −31.861±0.259 mas/yr Dec.: −4.195±0.215 mas/yr
Parallax (π)	7.3651±0.1407 mas
Distance	443 ± 8 ly (136 ± 3 pc)
Absolute magnitude (M_{V})	−0.17

Details
Mass	1.62±0.19 M_{☉}
Radius	21.20±2.06 R_{☉}
Luminosity	189.6±4.2 L_{☉}
Surface gravity (log g)	1.96±0.07 cgs
Temperature	4,383±19 K
Metallicity [Fe/H]	−0.08±0.04 dex
Rotational velocity (v sin i)	2.59±0.45 km/s
Age	1.98±0.67 Gyr

Other designations
- CD−26°10060, GC 18954, HD 122430, HIP 68581, HR 5265, SAO 182182, GCRV 8247

Database references
SIMBAD	data

HD 122430 is single star in the equatorial constellation of Hydra. It has an orange hue and is faintly visible to the naked eye with an apparent visual magnitude of 5.47. The star is located at a distance of 105.6 light years from the Sun based on parallax. It has the Bayer designation h Hydrae.

This is an aging giant star with a stellar classification of K2–3III. It has completely run out of the hydrogen fuel that keeps it stable, although it is only two billion years old, younger than the Sun's 4.6 billion years. HD 122430 has a mass of 1.6 times and radius of 22.9 times that of the Sun. Despite its younger age, it has slightly lower metallicity, approximately 90%. It is radiating 190 times the luminosity of the Sun from its photosphere at an effective temperature of 4300 K.

A candidate exoplanet was reported orbiting the star via the radial velocity method at a conference in 2003, and designated HD 122430 b. It has an orbital period of 0.94 years and an eccentricity of 0.68. However, a follow-up study by Soto et al. (2015) failed to detect a signal, so it remains unconfirmed.

The HD 122430 planetary system
Companion (in order from star)	Mass	Semimajor axis (AU)	Orbital period (days)	Eccentricity	Inclination (°)	Radius
b (unconfirmed)	>3.71 M_{J}	1.02	344.95±1.08	0.68±0.09	—	—

== See also ==
- HD 47536
- List of extrasolar planets
