= HD 56618 =

Star in the constellation of Canis Major

- Location of HD 56618 (circled in red)

Observation data Epoch J2000.0 Equinox ICRS
- Constellation: Canis Major
- Right ascension: 07^{h} 16^{m} 34.99315^{s}
- Declination: −27° 52′ 52.2453″
- Apparent magnitude (V): 4.66

Characteristics
- Evolutionary stage: AGB
- Spectral type: M2III
- B−V color index: 1.589±0.028

Astrometry
Radial velocity (R_{v})	+41.5±2.8 km/s
Proper motion (μ)	RA: −13.479 mas/yr Dec.: +38.625 mas/yr
Parallax (π)	8.3189±0.2874 mas
Distance	390 ± 10 ly (120 ± 4 pc)
Absolute magnitude (M_{V})	−0.80

Details
Mass	1.5 M_{☉}
Radius	61.1+7.3 −6.9 R_{☉}
Luminosity	699.7±27.3 L_{☉}
Surface gravity (log g)	1.35 cgs
Temperature	3,797+233 −209 K
Metallicity [Fe/H]	−0.24 dex

Other designations
- CD−27°3852, FK5 2562, HD 56618, HIP 35205, HR 2766, SAO 173360

Database references
SIMBAD	data

HD 56618 is a single star in the southern constellation of Canis Major. It is a red-hued star that is faintly visible to the naked eye with an apparent visual magnitude of 4.66. This object is located at a distance of approximately 390 light years from the Sun based on parallax measurements. It is drifting further away with a radial velocity of +41.5 km/s, having come to within 203 light-years some 2.2 million years ago. Olin J. Eggen listed it as a probable member of the Hyades supercluster.

This is an aging red giant star currently on the asymptotic giant branch with a stellar classification of M2III. It is no longer undergoing core hydrogen fusion and has expanded to 61 times the radius of the Sun. The star is radiating 700 times the luminosity of the Sun from its enlarged photosphere at an effective temperature of 3,797 K.
