= HD 47366 =

Star in the constellation Canis Major

Observation data Epoch J2000.0 Equinox ICRS
- Constellation: Canis Major
- Right ascension: 06^{h} 37^{m} 40.793^{s}
- Declination: −12° 59′ 06.42″
- Apparent magnitude (V): 6.12

Characteristics
- Evolutionary stage: red giant branch
- Spectral type: K1III:
- B−V color index: 0.977

Astrometry
Radial velocity (R_{v})	9.01 km/s
Proper motion (μ)	RA: 10.239 mas/yr Dec.: −125.836 mas/yr
Parallax (π)	11.8263±0.0636 mas
Distance	276 ± 1 ly (84.6 ± 0.5 pc)
Absolute magnitude (M_{V})	1.459

Details
Mass	1.81±0.13 M_{☉}
Radius	7.30±0.33 R_{☉}
Luminosity	26.1±1.8 L_{☉}
Surface gravity (log g)	2.60 cgs
Temperature	4,772 K
Metallicity [Fe/H]	−0.16 dex
Rotation	< 86 d
Rotational velocity (v sin i)	4.3±0.8 km/s
Age	1.61±0.53 Gyr

Other designations
- BD−12°1566, HD 47366, HIP 31674, HR 2437, SAO 151725

Database references
SIMBAD	data

HD 47366 is the Henry Draper Catalogue designation for a star in the southern constellation of Canis Major. It has an apparent visual magnitude of 6.12, which puts it near the lower limit of stars visible to the naked eye. According to the Bortle scale, it can be viewed from dark rural skies. Parallax measurements performed by the Gaia spacecraft provide a distance estimate of 276 light-years (85 parsecs).

This is a K-type giant star with a stellar classification of K1III: − the colon suffix indicates some uncertainty in the luminosity classification of III. Spectroscopic analysis of the star was used to derive an estimated mass of about 1.81 times the mass of the Sun. It has an estimated age of 1.6 billion years; old enough at that mass to have evolved off the main sequence. As a giant star, the atmosphere has expanded to 7.3 times the Sun's radius, and it is emitting 26 times the solar luminosity at an effective temperature of 4,772 K. The projected rotational velocity of the star is 4.3 km/s, indicating it is rotating with a period of under 86 days.

In 2016, a team of astronomers reported the detection of a pair of giant planetary companions. Radial velocity measurements indicated gravitational perturbations of the star being caused by orbiting objects. The best fit to the preliminary data suggests two periodicities: one almost exactly a year long like the Earth's periodicity, and a second of around two years. Both objects are predicted to have masses greater than that of the planet Jupiter: their minimum masses are 1.8 and 1.9 Jupiter masses, respectively. Until the inclination of their orbits is known, their actual masses cannot be pinned down more accurately.

The HD 47366 planetary system
Companion (in order from star)	Mass	Semimajor axis (AU)	Orbital period (days)	Eccentricity	Inclination (°)	Radius
b	≥ 1.75+0.20 −0.17 M_{J}	1.214+0.030 −0.029	363.3+2.5 −2.4	0.089+0.079 −0.060	—	—
c	≥ 1.86+0.16 −0.15 M_{J}	1.853+0.045 −0.045	684.7+5.0 −4.9	0.278+0.069 −0.094	—	—

Modelling of the orbits of the two planets showed that they are dynamically unstable on the life span of their host star unless they are in a 2:1 mean motion resonance or are on mutually retrograde orbits. In 2019, J. P. Marshall and associates proposed an orbital fit with lower eccentricities that is more stable. The new fit is closer to the 2:1 mean motion resonance. As the host star continues to evolve to a larger radius, it is expected that both planets will undergo orbital decay due to tidal forces and be engulfed.
