= FY Canis Majoris =

Variable star in the constellation Canis Major

- Location of FY Canis Majoris (circled)

Observation data Epoch J2000.0 Equinox ICRS
- Constellation: Canis Major
- Right ascension: 07^{h} 26^{m} 59.48269^{s}
- Declination: −23° 05′ 09.6897″
- Apparent magnitude (V): 4.8 - 6.25

Characteristics
- Spectral type: B0.5 IVe
- Variable type: γ Cas

Astrometry
Proper motion (μ)	RA: −6.692±0.038 mas/yr Dec.: +4.054±0.078 mas/yr
Parallax (π)	1.7919±0.0645 mas
Distance	1,820 ± 70 ly (560 ± 20 pc)
Absolute magnitude (M_{V})	−2.23

Orbit
Primary	Be star
Name	subdwarf
Period (P)	37.257±0.003 d
Inclination (i)	>66°
Periastron epoch (T)	2448529.64±0.15
Semi-amplitude (K_{1}) (primary)	14.4±0.9 km/s
Semi-amplitude (K_{2}) (secondary)	128.2±2.2 km/s

Details

Be star
Mass	10-13 M_{☉}
Radius	6.8 R_{☉}
Luminosity	26,915 L_{☉}
Temperature	27,500±3,000 K
Rotational velocity (v sin i)	340±40 km/s

subdwarf
Mass	1.1-1.5 M_{☉}
Radius	0.81 R_{☉}
Luminosity	2,399 L_{☉}
Temperature	45,000±5,000 K
Rotational velocity (v sin i)	41±5 km/s

Other designations
- HD 58978, HIP 36168, HR 2855, SAO 173752, BD−22 1874

Database references
SIMBAD	data

FY Canis Majoris (FY CMa), also known as HD 58978, is a star about 1,800 light years from the Earth, in the constellation Canis Major (very near the border of Puppis). It is usually a 5th magnitude star, so it will be visible to the naked eye of an observer far from city lights. It is a Gamma Cassiopeiae variable star, whose brightness varies from magnitude 4.8 to 6.25.

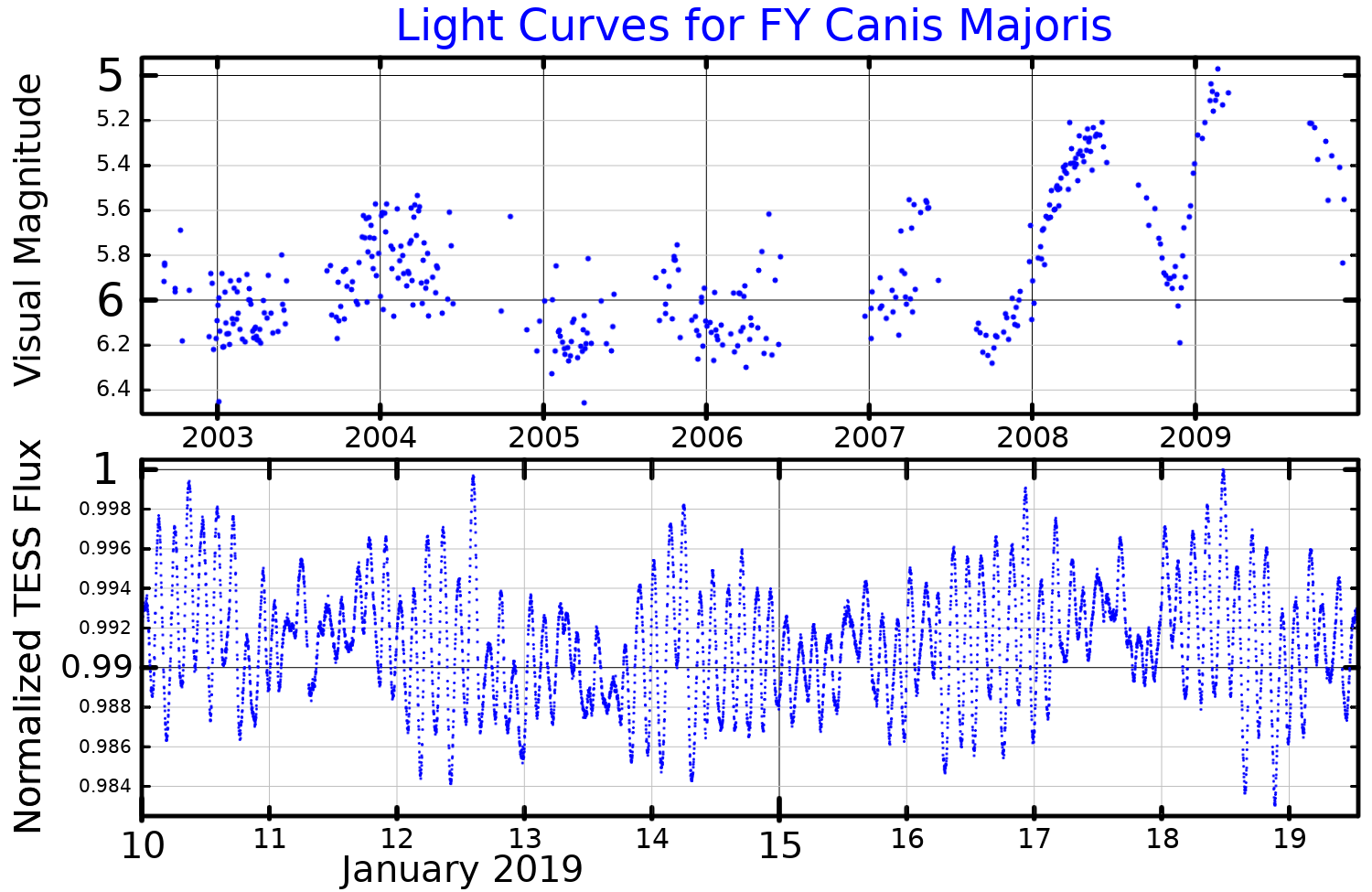
Light curves for FY CMa. The upper panel, showing the long-timescale variability, is plotted from ASAS data, and the lower panels, showing short-timescale variability, is plotted from TESS data.

In 1967, Alejandro Feinstein detected low amplitude (0.14 magnitude) variability in HD 58978's brightness, from photoelectric observations at La Plata Observatory. The star was given the variable star designation FY Canis Majoris in 1973. During an outburst in 2009, the star brightened to magnitude 4.8, its historical peak brightness. TESS data show that FY CMa pulsates at many different frequencies, with periods ranging from 1.07 hours to 5.8 days.

In 1905, Edward King noted that FY CMa has a peculiar spectrum with an unusually bright Hβ (and other) emission lines. Paul Merrill et al. listed it as a Be star in 1925. Spectra taken by various observers over several decades of the 20th century showed that the strength and relative intensities of the star's emission line are variable, and could change on a timescale of just a few days.

In 2008, Geraldine Peters et al. obtained high resolution spectra from the IUE and found that the Be star has a hot, far less massive hot subdwarf companion star, with which it forms a spectroscopic binary.

Hui-Lau Cao calculated that FY CMa is losing mass at a rate of about 6 × 10^{−8} M_{☉}/year via a stellar wind with a terminal velocity of about 750 km/sec.
