= 145 G. Canis Majoris =

Star in the constellation Canis Major

- Location of 145 G. Canis Majoris (circled in red)

Observation data Epoch J2000 Equinox J2000
- Constellation: Canis Major
- Right ascension: 07^{h} 16^{m} 36.83456^{s}
- Declination: −23° 18′ 56.1383″
- Apparent magnitude (V): 4.79

Characteristics
- Spectral type: K3Ib- or K4III
- B−V color index: 1.710

Astrometry
Radial velocity (R_{v})	+28.05±0.42 km/s
Proper motion (μ)	RA: −3.816 mas/yr Dec.: +3.896 mas/yr
Parallax (π)	1.2155±0.0998 mas
Distance	2,700 ± 200 ly (820 ± 70 pc)
Absolute magnitude (M_{V})	−4.03

Details
Mass	7.8±0.5 M_{☉}
Radius	315 R_{☉}
Luminosity	23,660 L_{☉}
Surface gravity (log g)	0.70 cgs
Temperature	3,986 K
Metallicity [Fe/H]	0.03 dex
Rotational velocity (v sin i)	7.4±1.0 km/s
Age	35.4±2.0 Myr

Other designations
- 145 G. CMa, NSV 3503, CD−23°5189, HD 56577, HIP 35210, HR 2764, SAO 173349, WDS J07166-2319A

Database references
SIMBAD	data

145 G. Canis Majoris (HD 56577) is a single K giant or supergiant star in the southern constellation of Canis Major. This star is Gould's 145th of Canis Major in his Uranometria Argentina. SIMBAD erroneously lists the star in its object query result as "* 145 CMa – Star".

== Stellar properties ==
The spectral type of 145 G. Canis Majoris has been given as K4III in 1978, with the luminosity class "III" corresponding to a giant star. In 1989, the spectral type was revised to K3Ib, with a luminosity class Ib suggesting the star is at the lower luminosity range of supergiant stars.

Measurement of stellar properties such as radius, luminosity and mass depend on the star's distance, which is not well-known. The Hipparcos mission measured a parallax of 2.30±0.52 mas, resulting in a distance of 1,400±300 ly. Based on this distance, a luminosity 5,250 times that of the Sun (L_{☉}) was calculated. From the luminosity and a temperature of 3,937±141 K, a radius of 156 ± 11 R_{☉} is obtained, (Note: Applying the Stefan–Boltzmann law with a nominal solar effective temperature of 5,772 K: $$\sqrt{\biggl(\frac{5,772}{3,939}\biggr)^4 \cdot 10^{3.72}} = 155.71\ R_\odot$$.) and a mass and age of 1.90 M_{☉} and 1.05 Gyr have been obtained using the stellar parameters and isochrones. Those values are consistent with the star being a giant. However, parallax measurements by the Gaia spacecraft suggest the star is more distant than previously thought, hence has higher luminosity, radius and mass. A radius of 315 R_{☉} and a luminosity of 23,660 L_{☉} have been derived using the Gaia DR3 distance, suggesting the star is indeed a supergiant. At the Gaia DR2 parallax, the star should have a luminosity of 14,000 L_{☉}, also rather high for a giant. Values for the mass and age at the Gaia distance have not been computed yet, but a 2012 study give 7.8±0.5 M_{☉} and 35.4±2.0 Myr.

The effective temperature of the star is around 4,000 K, which gives it an orange hue typical of K-type stars.

The star is one component of a close double, the other being HD 56578 which on its own would be a faint naked-eye star. The two are separated by 27″. The two stars appear to be unrelated and the close alignment accidental, with HD 56578 being a much closer and less luminous Am star.
