= WR 147 =

Star system in the constellation of Cygnus

Observation data Epoch J2000 Equinox ICRS
- Constellation: Cygnus
- Right ascension: 20^{h} 36^{m} 43.632^{s}
- Declination: +40° 21′ 07.44″
- Apparent magnitude (V): 13.86 + 16.02

Characteristics

WR
- Evolutionary stage: Wolf-Rayet
- Spectral type: WN8h
- B−V color index: +4.06

OB
- Spectral type: B0.5V
- B−V color index: +4.09

Astrometry
Proper motion (μ)	RA: −1.417 mas/yr Dec.: −5.737 mas/yr
Parallax (π)	0.5014±0.0797 mas
Distance	2100±200 ly (630±70 pc)
Absolute magnitude (M_{V})	−7.22

Details

WR 147S (WR)
Mass	51 M_{☉}
Radius	29.8 R_{☉}
Luminosity	1,995,000 L_{☉}
Temperature	39,800 K

WR 147N (OB)
Radius	9.18 R_{☉}
Luminosity	50,000 L_{☉}
Temperature	28,500 K

Other designations
- IRAS 20349+4010, 1E 2034+40.1, 2E 4394, 2MASS J20364364+4021075

Database references
SIMBAD	WR 147

WR 147 is a multiple star system in the constellation of Cygnus. The system is extremely reddened by interstellar extinction – that is, dust in front of the star scatters much of the blue light coming from WR 147, leaving the star appearing reddish.

== Distance ==
The distance of WR 147 has been calculated to be 630 parsecs based on infrared photometry, which would place it in front of the OB association known as Cygnus OB2. The extinction in the visual range was calculated to be 11.5 magnitudes and the absolute visual magnitude assumed to be −6.7. This would make WR 147 one of the closest known Wolf-Rayet stars, despite its faint apparent magnitude.

A later calculation using optical and ultraviolet photometry derived a slightly lower value for the extinction. Combined with an assumption of a brighter absolute magnitude, this gave a distance modulus of 10.6 corresponding to a distance of about 1,200 pc. This is still one of the nearest Wolf–Rayet systems to the sun.

A Gaia Data Release 3 parallax of 0.5 mas corresponds to a distance of around 2,000 parsecs although there is considerable uncertainly on that value.

== System ==
WR 147 consists of at least two very massive stars. The primary is a Wolf–Rayet star, designated WR 147S or just WR 147. A companion, designated WR 147N, is a B-type main-sequence star or O-type giant) 0.5″ away to the north. A much closer companion is also suspected on the basis of a "radio pinwheel" which would be produced as the companion orbits through the wind of the primary star with a period of 1.7 years.

WR 147 was resolved into two components in the 1990s, separated first at radio wavelengths. Based on an angular separation of about 643±157 mas, this translates to a projected (i.e. minimum) separation of about 403±45 AU, which is about thirteen times the distance between Neptune and the Sun. The location of the companion resolved in the near-infrared is slightly further from the primary than the radio source originally called WR 147N, and it has been referred to as WR 147NIR.

The Wolf–Rayet star in the system (WR 147S) has a luminosity of 2,000,000 L_{☉}, making it one of the most luminous stars known. The B-type companion is much less luminous, at 50,000 L_{☉}.

The orbital elements of WR 147's orbit are poorly known, as the two components are separated far enough that no orbital motion has been detected, but it is estimated that one orbit would take 1,300 years. The inclination of WR 147's orbit to our line of sight is also unknown: numerous studies have given values ranging from 30° to 60°. Constraining the value of the inclination is important because the true separation of the stars depends on the value.

== Colliding wind ==
Stellar wind from these two stars collide and emit X-rays and radio waves. The Wolf–Rayet star is losing mass at a rate of 2.4×10^{−5} M_{☉}/yr and the companion is losing mass at a rate of 4×10^{−7} M_{☉}/yr. The plasma generated from the wind collision may reach temperatures as high as 2.7 keV, or 31 million kelvins.

Despite the name, the colliding wind shock is actually considered to be collisionless, that is the ions in the wind do not for the most part directly collide.

== X-rays ==
In 2010, X-ray emission from WR 147 was resolved into two sources: one where the wind collision is thought to be occurring, and another directly from the Wolf–Rayet star, the cause of which is not clear. It was hypothesized to be another massive star orbiting the Wolf–Rayet star; if so, it would have an orbital period of 15 to 20 days, with the total mass of the system being 20 M_{☉}, leading to a separation of about 0.33 AU.

== See also ==
- WR 140, the prototype colliding-wind binary
