= HD 43197 =

Star in the constellation Canis Major

HD 43197 / Amadioha
Observation data Epoch J2000.0 Equinox ICRS
- Constellation: Canis Major
- Right ascension: 06^{h} 13^{m} 35.66155^{s}
- Declination: −29° 53′ 50.1516″
- Apparent magnitude (V): 8.98

Characteristics
- Evolutionary stage: main sequence
- Spectral type: G8/K0 IV/V
- Apparent magnitude (B): 9.797
- Apparent magnitude (J): 7.658±0.024
- Apparent magnitude (H): 7.328±0.038
- Apparent magnitude (K): 7.203±0.026
- B−V color index: 0.817±0.022

Astrometry
Radial velocity (R_{v})	72.45±0.13 km/s
Proper motion (μ)	RA: 147.648±0.010 mas/yr Dec.: 16.600±0.011 mas/yr
Parallax (π)	16.0171±0.0106 mas
Distance	203.6 ± 0.1 ly (62.43 ± 0.04 pc)
Absolute magnitude (M_{V})	5.24

Details
Mass	1.02±0.02 M_{☉}
Radius	0.96±0.02 R_{☉}
Luminosity	0.74±0.01 L_{☉}
Surface gravity (log g)	4.47±0.03 cgs
Temperature	5,469±35 K
Metallicity [Fe/H]	0.4 dex
Rotational velocity (v sin i)	2.18 km/s
Age	3.1±2.0 Gyr

Other designations
- Amadioha, CD−29°2884, HD 43197, HIP 29550, SAO 171427, PPM 250048

Database references
SIMBAD	data
Exoplanet Archive	data

HD 43197 is a star with an exoplanetary companion in the southern constellation of Canis Major. It has been given the proper name Amadioha, as selected by Nigeria during the NameExoWorlds campaign that celebrated the 100th anniversary of the IAU. Amadioha is the god of thunder in Igbo mythology. It has an apparent visual magnitude of 8.98, meaning this is a ninth magnitude star that is too dim to be visible to the naked eye. The system is located at a distance of 204 light-years from the Sun based on parallax measurements, and is drifting further away with a radial velocity of +72 km/s. It made its closest approach some 583,000 years ago when it came to within 87 light-years.

The stellar classification of this star is G8/K0 IV/V, which may be interpreted to mean the spectrum is intermediate between similar stars of class G8 and K0, and its luminosity class showing a blend of a main sequence star (V) and a subgiant star (IV). It is a weakly active star with a high metallicity, being five halves as much as the Sun. The star is about the same mass and size as the Sun, although the luminosity is only 74% of solar. The star's age is estimated to be at least three billion years and it is modelled to be right at the end of its main sequence life.

== Planetary system ==
In 2009, the HARPS planet search program announced a Jovian planet in a highly eccentric orbit around the star. The planet spends ~78% of its orbital period in the habitable zone of the host star, although temperatures can reach 716 K during periastron passage. In 2022, a second super-Jovian planet was discovered using a combination of radial velocity and astrometry. Assuming the inner planet shares the outer planet's orbital inclination, its true mass would be about 4 M_{J}.

The HD 43197 planetary system
Companion (in order from star)	Mass	Semimajor axis (AU)	Orbital period (days)	Eccentricity	Inclination (°)	Radius
b (Equiano)	≥0.553+0.052 −0.048 M_{J}	0.882+0.035 −0.039	308.9+2.3 −2.8	0.742+0.017 −0.018	—	—
c	7.868+1.760 −1.599 M_{J}	8.540+2.334 −1.584	9296.0+4133.0 −2422.1	0.149+0.112 −0.087	11.420+5.388 −3.070	—

== See also ==
- List of extrasolar planets
