= 17 Canis Majoris =

Star in the constellation Canis Major

Observation data Epoch J2000 Equinox ICRS
- Constellation: Canis Major
- Right ascension: 06^{h} 55^{m} 02.73800^{s}
- Declination: −20° 24′ 17.5578″
- Apparent magnitude (V): 5.80

Characteristics
- Evolutionary stage: Main sequence
- Spectral type: A2 V
- B−V color index: 0.048±0.003

Astrometry
Radial velocity (R_{v})	−12.9±0.5 km/s
Proper motion (μ)	RA: −0.242 mas/yr Dec.: −10.241 mas/yr
Parallax (π)	5.4157±0.0438 mas
Distance	602 ± 5 ly (185 ± 1 pc)
Absolute magnitude (M_{V})	−0.14

Details
Mass	2.84±0.05 M_{☉}
Radius	5.2 R_{☉}
Luminosity	126+18 −15 L_{☉}
Surface gravity (log g)	3.38 cgs
Temperature	8,872+164 −162 K
Rotational velocity (v sin i)	43 km/s
Age	340 Myr

Other designations
- 17 CMa, BD−20°1624, GC 9078, HD 51055, HIP 33248, HR 2588, SAO 172569, ADS 5585, CCDM 06550-2025, WDS J06550-2024

Database references
SIMBAD	data

17 Canis Majoris is a single star in the southern constellation of Canis Major, located 602 light years away from the Sun. It is visible to the naked eye as a dim, white-hued star with an apparent visual magnitude of 5.80. The object is moving closer to the Earth with a heliocentric radial velocity of −13 km/s.

This is an A-type main-sequence star with a stellar classification of A2 V, and is near the end of its main sequence lifetime. It has 2.8 times the mass of the Sun and is spinning with a projected rotational velocity of 43 km/s. The star is radiating 126 times the luminosity of the Sun from its photosphere at an effective temperature of 8,872 K. It has a magnitude 8.66 visual companion at an angular separation of 42.90″ along a position angle of 147°, as of 2015.
