= 27 Canis Majoris =

Binary star system in the constellation Canis Major

- Location of 27 Canis Majoris (circled in red)

Observation data Epoch J2000 Equinox ICRS
- Constellation: Canis Major
- Right ascension: 07^{h} 14^{m} 15.21192^{s}
- Declination: −26° 21′ 09.0312″
- Apparent magnitude (V): +4.62 – 4.82 (+4.92 + 5.39)

Characteristics
- Spectral type: B3 IIIpe
- B−V color index: −0.17±0.16
- Variable type: γ Cas + β Cep:

Astrometry
Radial velocity (R_{v})	16.3±3.6 km/s
Proper motion (μ)	RA: −6.91 mas/yr Dec.: +3.17 mas/yr
Parallax (π)	1.88±0.32 mas
Distance	approx. 1,700 ly (approx. 530 pc)
Absolute magnitude (M_{V})	−4.13

Orbit
Period (P)	118.54±11.14 yr
Semi-major axis (a)	0.178±0.012″
Eccentricity (e)	0.747±0.094
Inclination (i)	80.2±1.0°
Longitude of the node (Ω)	131.3±3.0°
Periastron epoch (T)	1,971.01±0.74
Argument of periastron (ω) (secondary)	85.0±3.6°

Details

27 CMa A
Mass	12.5±2.5 M_{☉}
Luminosity (bolometric)	15,610 L_{☉}
Surface gravity (log g)	3.514 cgs
Temperature	21,061 K
Rotational velocity (v sin i)	290 km/s
Age	0.1±0.1 Myr

Other designations
- 27 CMa, EW Canis Majoris, CD−26°4057, GC 9608, HD 56014, HIP 34981, HR 2745, SAO 173264, CCDM J07143-2621, WDS J07143-2621

Database references
SIMBAD	data

27 Canis Majoris is a binary star system in the northern constellation of Canis Major, located approximately 1,700 light years away from the Sun. It has the variable star designation EW Canis Majoris; 27 Canis Majoris is the Flamsteed designation. This system is visible to the naked eye as a 4th-magnitude, blue-white hued star. It is moving away from the Earth with a heliocentric radial velocity of 16 km/s.

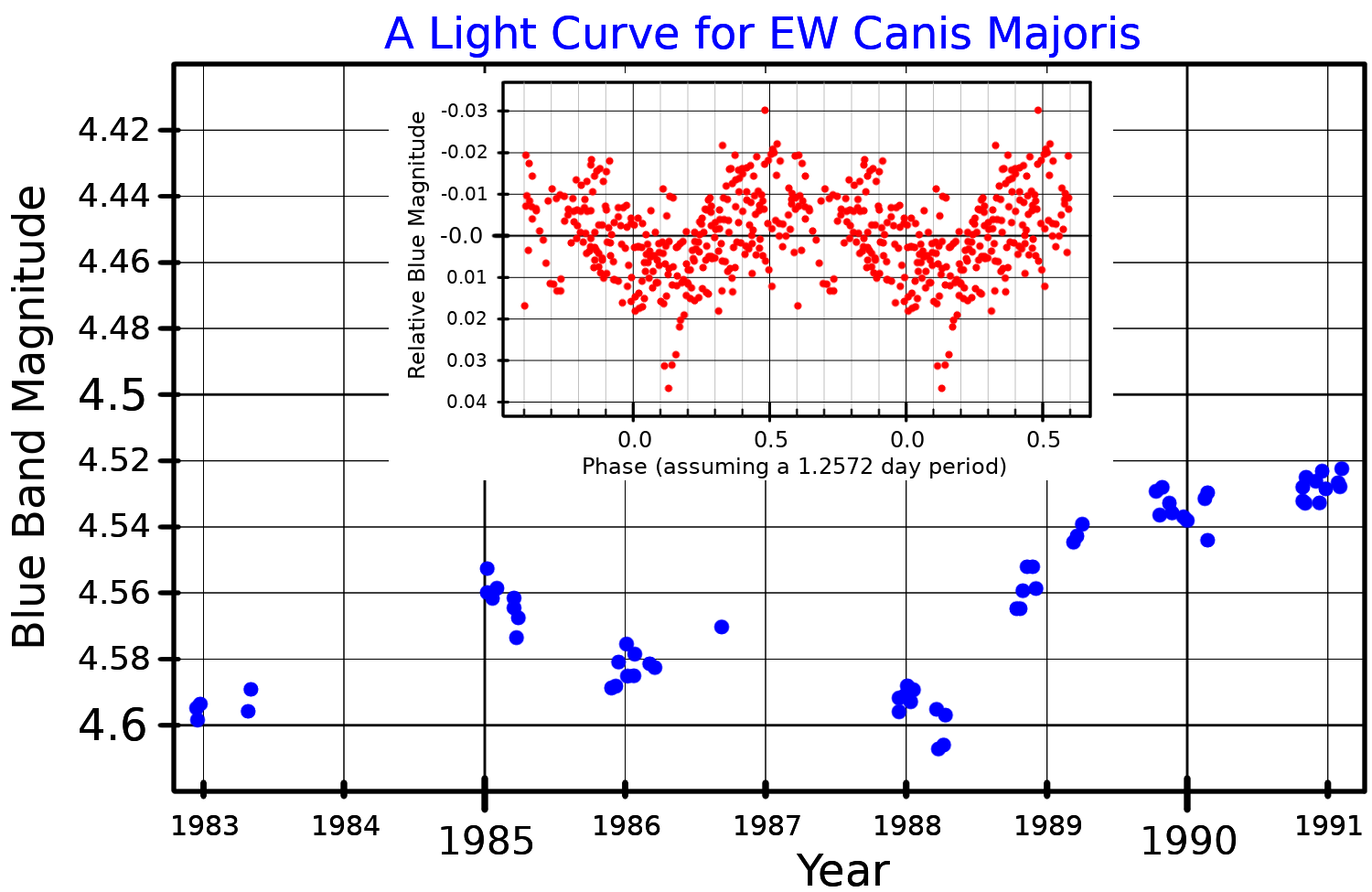
Blue band light curves for EW Canis Majoris. The main plot shows the long term variability, and the inset plot shows the short term variability. Adapted from Mennickent et al. (1994) and Balona & Rozowsky (1991).

The pair of stars in this system were first resolved by W. S. Finsen in 1953, and the split has been widening since that time. The system has an orbital period of around 119 years with an eccentricity of 0.7 and a semimajor axis of 0.178″. The magnitude 4.92 primary, designated component A, is a Be star with a stellar classification of B3 IIIpe. It is spinning rapidly with a projected rotational velocity of 290 km/s, compared to a critical velocity of 389 km/s. The star appears to be a Beta Cephei variable with a pulsation period of 0.0919 days and an amplitude of 0.0080 in magnitude.

The magnitude 5.39 secondary, component B, is classified as a Gamma Cassiopeiae type variable star. Due to its variable nature, the brightness of the system varies from magnitude +4.42 to +4.82.
