= HD 47536 b =

Extrasolar planet in the constellation Canis Major

Discovery
- Discovered by: Setiawan et al.
- Discovery site: Chile
- Discovery date: January 22, 2003
- Detection method: Radial velocity

Orbital characteristics
- Apastron: 1.96 AU (293,000,000 km)
- Periastron: 1.26 AU (188,000,000 km)
- Semi-major axis: 1.61 AU (241,000,000 km)
- Eccentricity: 0.2 ± 0.08
- Orbital period (sidereal): 430 d 1.18 y
- Average orbital speed: 40.8
- Time of periastron: 2,451,599 ± 21.5
- Argument of periastron: 260.8 ± 23.7
- Semi-amplitude: 113 ± 11
- Star: HD 47536

HD 47536 b is an extrasolar planet located approximately 400 light-years away.

== See also ==
- HD 47536 c
