= LS Canis Majoris =

Binary star system in the constellation Canis Major

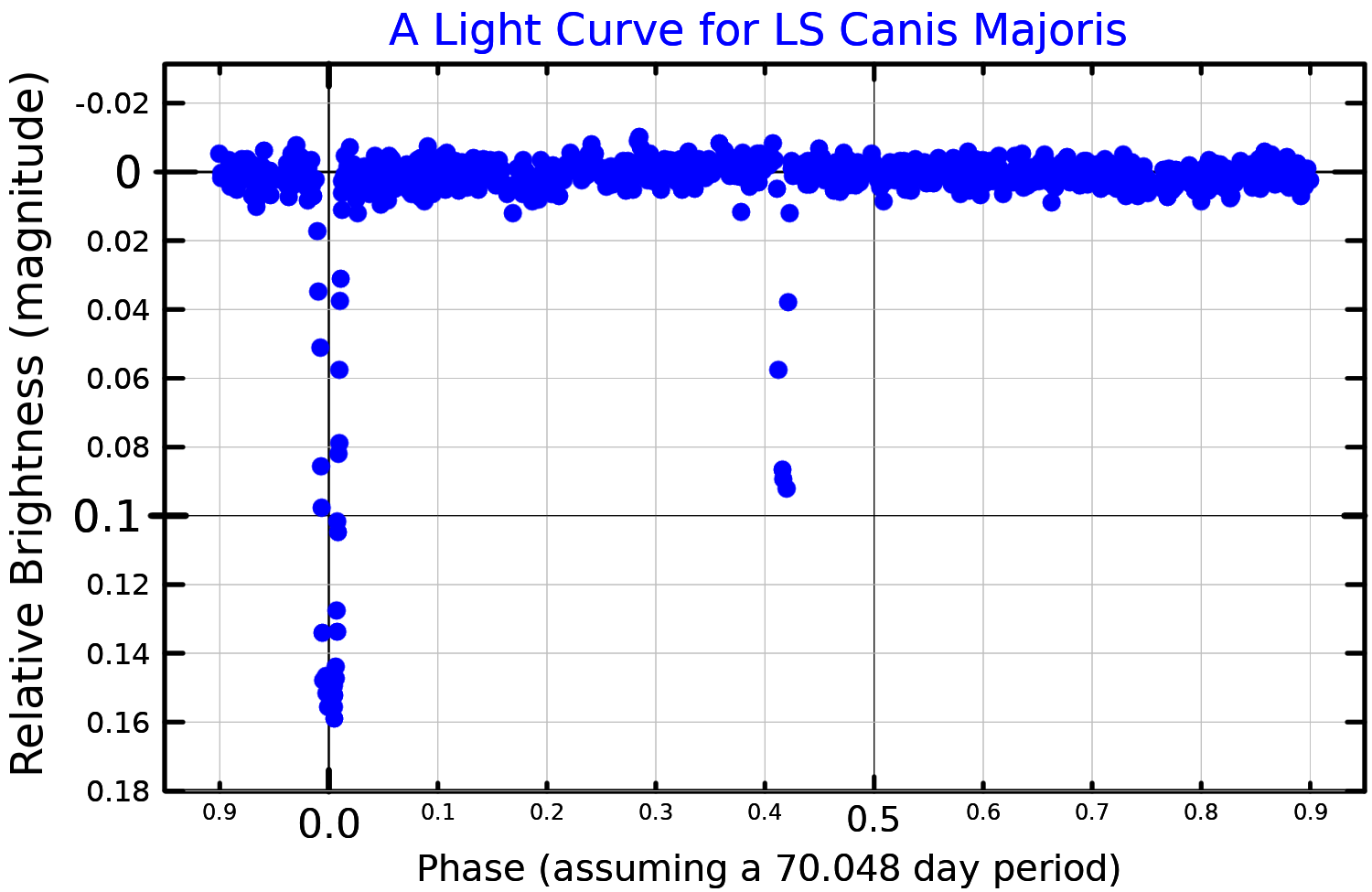
- A light curve for LS Canis Majoris from BRITE nanosatellite data, adapted from Ratajczak et al. (2019)

Observation data Epoch J2000 Equinox J2000
- Constellation: Canis Major
- Right ascension: 07^{h} 01^{m} 05.94626^{s}
- Declination: −25° 12′ 56.2817″
- Apparent magnitude (V): 5.63 – 5.79

Characteristics
- Spectral type: B2/3III/IV
- Variable type: Eclipsing binary

Astrometry
Radial velocity (R_{v})	6.0 km/s
Proper motion (μ)	RA: −4.638 mas/yr Dec.: +5.332 mas/yr
Parallax (π)	2.1591±0.0613 mas
Distance	1,510 ± 40 ly (460 ± 10 pc)
Absolute magnitude (M_{V})	−2.04

Other designations
- LS CMa, CD−25°3911, HR 2640, HD 52670, HIP 33804, SAO 172763, GC 9253

Database references
SIMBAD	data

LS Canis Majoris is an eclipsing binary star located around 1,510 light years from Earth in the constellation Canis Major. Its apparent magnitude ranges from 5.63 to 5.79, so it is faintly visible to the naked eye. The orbital period of binary pair and the period of light variation is 70.048 days.

The star's variability was first detected in the Hipparcos satellite data, and it was given its variable star designation in 1999.
