= HR 2501 =

Star in the constellation Canis Major

- Location of HR 2501 (circled in red)

Observation data Epoch J2000.0 Equinox ICRS
- Constellation: Canis Major
- Right ascension: 06^{h} 45^{m} 31.18877^{s}
- Declination: −30° 56′ 56.3297″
- Apparent magnitude (V): 5.35 - 5.80

Characteristics
- Evolutionary stage: main sequence
- Spectral type: B1.5 Vne
- U−B color index: −0.89
- B−V color index: −0.19
- Variable type: γ Cas + λ Eri

Astrometry
Proper motion (μ)	RA: −3.284±0.084 mas/yr Dec.: 4.630±0.098 mas/yr
Parallax (π)	1.6500±0.0895 mas
Distance	2,000 ± 100 ly (610 ± 30 pc)
Absolute magnitude (M_{V})	−3.23

Details
Mass	9.6 M_{☉}
Radius	7.5 R_{☉}
Luminosity	2,067 L_{☉}
Surface gravity (log g)	3.60 cgs
Temperature	22,070 K
Metallicity [Fe/H]	+0.18 dex
Rotational velocity (v sin i)	135 km/s
Age	23 Myr

Other designations
- HP Canis Majoris, HD 49131, HIP 32385, SAO 197177

Database references
SIMBAD	data

HR 2501, also known as HD 49131 and HP Canis Majoris, is a star about 2,000 light years from the Earth, in the constellation Canis Major. It is a 5th magnitude star, so it will be faintly visible to the naked eye of an observer far from city lights. It is a variable star, whose brightness varies from magnitude 5.35 to 5.80 on a variety of timescales ranging from hours to hundreds of days.

In 1838, John Herschel discovered that HR 2501 is a double star, with a magnitude 8.4 companion 4.9 arc seconds away. The companion is a slightly less massive, cooler, and less luminous B-type main sequence star. It is also a chemically peculiar helium-weak star.

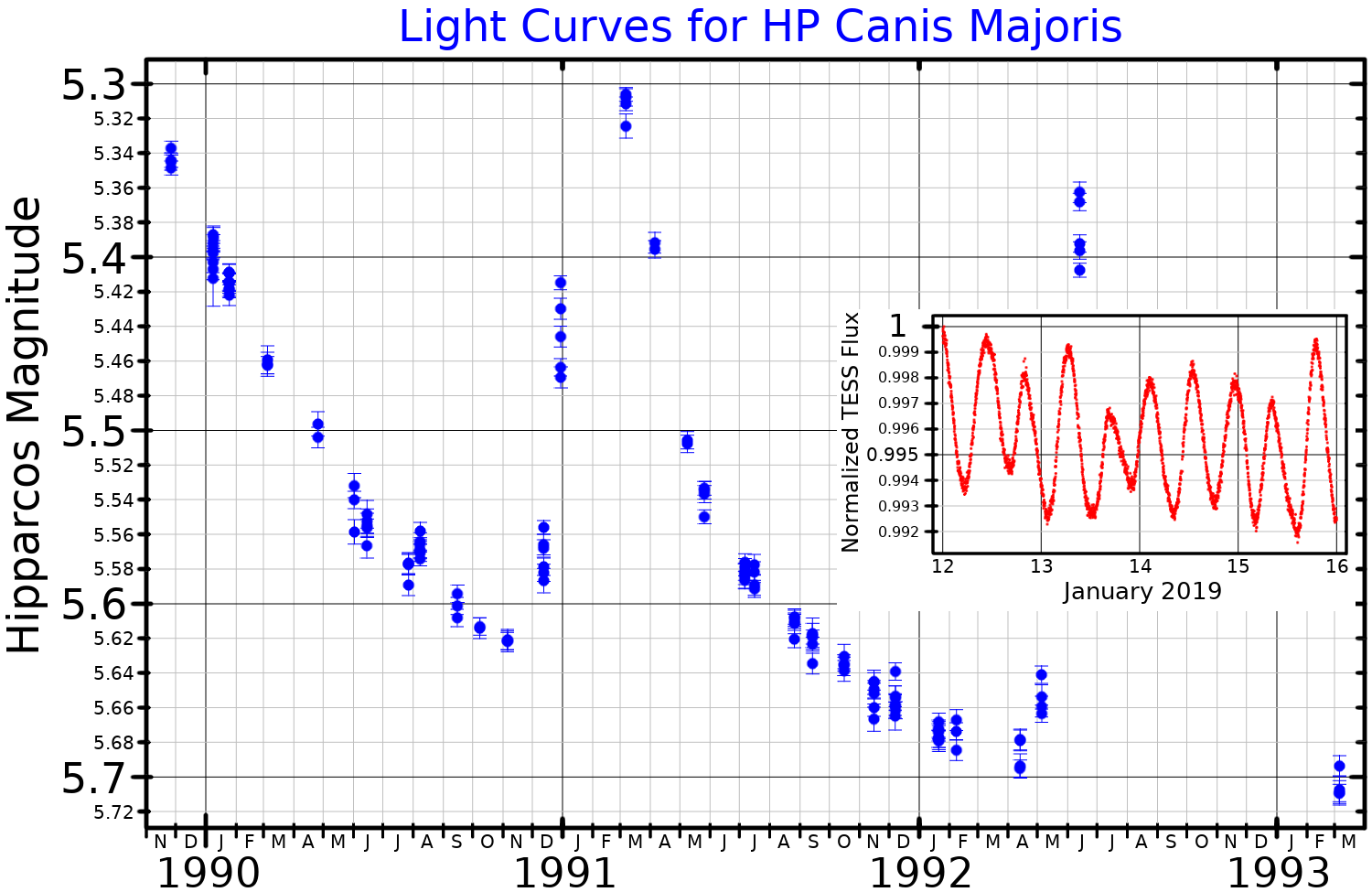
Light curves for HP Canis Majoris. The main plot, from Hipparcos data, shows the long-term variability. The inset plot, from TESS data, shows the short timescale variability.

In 1977, Mikolaj Jerzykiewicz and Christiaan Sterken detected slight (0.12 magnitude) variability in the brightness of HR 2501 during their search for beta Cephei variable stars in the southern sky. Christoffel Waelkens et al. confirmed that HR 2501 is variable in 1983, and reported that it varied in brightness on a timescale of weeks to months, with no clear period. In 1986 it was given the variable star designation HP Canis Majoris. In 1998, Anne-Marie Hubert and Michele Floquet examined the Hipparcos data for HR 2501, and found that it exhibited outbursts in which the brightness increased by 0.35 magnitudes, with a rise time of 100 days and a decay time of 400 days.

In 1984, Christopher Corbally found that the spectrum HR 2501 shows Hα, Hβ, Hγ and Hδ emission features, which along with its spectral type makes it a Be star. Jacqueline Coté found that the IRAS data for HR 2501 showed excess (above what would be expected from the star's photosphere) 12 and 25 μ emission. She concluded that this infrared excess could be due to either a circumstellar dust shell located 21 stellar radii from HR 2501, with a temperature of about 585 K, or (more likely) free-free emission from circumstellar gas.

An extensive study of HR 2501, published in 2003 by Fabien Carrier and Gilbert Burki, found that the star exhibits several periodicities. The radial velocity varies by 20.5 km/sec with a period of 19.005±0.0091 hours. They confirm the roughly 500 day photometric period found earlier by Hubert and Floquet, and suggest these outbursts may arise from episodes of matter ejection from the star or disk formation. Finally, they found a low amplitude (0.065 magnitude) brightness oscillation with a period of 11.05 hours. Spectroscopic data were presented by Carrier and Burki which suggest that during the brightness outbursts, "blobs" of ejected matter can be detected moving through a Keplerian disk surrounding the star.
