= HD 47667 =

Star in the constellation Canis Major

- Location of HD 47667 (circled in red)

Observation data Epoch J2000 Equinox J2000
- Constellation: Canis Major
- Right ascension: 06^{h} 39^{m} 16.71946^{s}
- Declination: −14° 08′ 44.7468″
- Apparent magnitude (V): 4.832

Characteristics
- Spectral type: K2+ IIIa CN0.5 Ca1
- B−V color index: 1.459±0.072

Astrometry
Radial velocity (R_{v})	+28.9±0.4 km/s
Proper motion (μ)	RA: +5.11 mas/yr Dec.: −6.65 mas/yr
Parallax (π)	3.4781±0.1727 mas
Distance	940 ± 50 ly (290 ± 10 pc)
Absolute magnitude (M_{V})	−2.56

Details
Mass	7.4±0.7 M_{☉}
Radius	28 R_{☉}
Luminosity	2,317 L_{☉}
Surface gravity (log g)	1.63 cgs
Temperature	4,200 K
Metallicity [Fe/H]	−0.21 dex
Age	40.1±11.9 Myr

Other designations
- BD−14°1525, FK5 2515, HD 47667, HIP 31827, HR 2450, SAO 151751

Database references
SIMBAD	data

HD 47667 is a single star in the southern constellation of Canis Major. It is visible to the naked eye with an apparent visual magnitude of 4.832. The estimated distance to this star, based upon an annual parallax shift of 3.30±0.35 mas, is roughly 1,000 light years. It is moving further away with a heliocentric radial velocity of +29 km/s. The star made its closest approach to the Sun some 8.7 million years ago at a separation of around 362 ly (111.12 pc).

Roughly 40 million years old, this is an evolved K-type giant star with a stellar classification of K2+ IIIa CN0.5 Ca1. The suffix notation indicates overabundances of calcium and the cyanide molecule have been found in the spectrum of the stellar atmosphere. The star has 7.4 times the mass of the Sun and has expanded to 28 times the Sun's radius. It is radiating 2,317 times the Sun's luminosity from its enlarged photosphere at an effective temperature of 4,200 K.
