= HD 47186 =

G-type star in the constellation Canis Major

Observation data Epoch J2000.0 Equinox ICRS
- Constellation: Canis Major
- Right ascension: 06^{h} 36^{m} 08.788^{s}
- Declination: −27° 37′ 20.27″
- Apparent magnitude (V): 7.63

Characteristics
- Evolutionary stage: main sequence
- Spectral type: G6V
- B−V color index: 0.714±0.002

Astrometry
Radial velocity (R_{v})	4.238±0.0003 km/s
Proper motion (μ)	RA: 21.582 mas/yr Dec.: −262.843 mas/yr
Parallax (π)	26.7476±0.0217 mas
Distance	121.94 ± 0.10 ly (37.39 ± 0.03 pc)
Absolute magnitude (M_{V})	4.64

Details
Mass	1.05±0.01 M_{☉}
Radius	1.12±0.01 R_{☉}
Luminosity	1.219±0.005 L_{☉}
Surface gravity (log g)	4.35±0.01 cgs
Temperature	5,736±21 K
Metallicity [Fe/H]	0.23 dex
Rotational velocity (v sin i)	1.953 km/s
Age	5.5±0.6 Gyr

Other designations
- CD−27°3124, HD 47186, HIP 31540, SAO 172008, LTT 2597, NLTT 16742

Database references
SIMBAD	data
Exoplanet Archive	data

HD 47186 is a star with a pair of orbiting exoplanets in the southern constellation of Canis Major. The system is located at a distance of 122 light years from the Sun based on parallax measurements, and is drifting further away with a radial velocity of 4.2 km/s. Although it has an absolute magnitude of 4.64, at the distance of this system the apparent visual magnitude is 7.63; too faint to be seen with the naked eye. It has a high proper motion, traversing the celestial sphere at an angular rate of 0.272″·yr^{−1}.

The spectrum of HD 47186 matches a G-type main-sequence star with a stellar classification of G6V. It is an estimated 5.5 billion years old and is spinning with a projected rotational velocity of 2 km/s. The star has 5% greater mass and a 12% larger girth compared to the Sun. The abundance of iron, a measure of the star's metallicity, is 1.7 times more than the Sun, making it metal-rich. HD 47186 is radiating 1.2 times the luminosity of the Sun from its photosphere at an effective temperature of 5,736 K.

== Planetary system ==
Announced in June 2008, two extrasolar planets were discovered orbiting the star. Both planets are less massive than Jupiter. The inner planet HD 47186 b orbits close to the star and is termed a "hot Neptune". The outer planet HD 47186 c orbits in a similar distance from the star as the asteroid Vesta in the Solar System, at around 2.4 AU. The inner planet orbits in a circular path while the outer planet orbits in an eccentric path.

The HD 47186 planetary system
Companion (in order from star)	Mass	Semimajor axis (AU)	Orbital period (days)	Eccentricity	Inclination (°)	Radius
b	≥22.8 M_{🜨}	0.050	4.0845 ± 0.0002	0.038 ± 0.020	—	—
c	≥111.46 M_{🜨}	2.395	1353.6 ± 57.1	0.249 ± 0.073	—	—

== See also ==
- HD 181433
- HD 40307
- MOA-2007-BLG-192L
