= HD 47186 b =

Hot Neptune extrasolar planet in the constellation of Canis Major

Discovery
- Discovered by: Bouchy et al.
- Discovery site: (Chile) La Silla Observatory
- Discovery date: June 16, 2008
- Detection method: Doppler spectroscopy

Orbital characteristics
- Apastron: 0.052 AU (7,800,000 km)
- Periastron: 0.048 AU (7,200,000 km)
- Semi-major axis: 0.050 AU (7,500,000 km)
- Eccentricity: 0.038 ± 0.02
- Orbital period (sidereal): 4.0845 ± 0.0002 d
- Average orbital speed: 130
- Time of periastron: 2,454,562.77 ± 0.08
- Star: HD 47186

HD 47186 b is a short-period “hot Neptune” extrasolar planet orbiting the nearby G-type star HD 47186 in the constellation Canis Major, at a distance of approximately 123 ly (38 pc) from Earth. With a minimum mass of about 22.8 M⊕, it belongs to the population of low-mass, close-in planets identified by high-precision radial velocity surveys of bright stars. The planet orbits at a distance of roughly 0.05 au (7,500,000 km; 4,600,000 mi) and completes one revolution in 4.0845 days. Its orbit is nearly circular, with an eccentricity of about 0.04.
