= PSR B0628−28 =

Isolated radio pulsar in the constellation Puppis

Observation data Epoch J2000 Equinox J2000
- Constellation: Puppis
- Right ascension: 06^{h} 30^{m} 49.39^{s}
- Declination: −28° 34′ 42.7″
- Apparent magnitude (V): ~ 26

Characteristics
- Spectral type: Pulsar

Astrometry
Radial velocity (R_{v})	212 km/s
Proper motion (μ)	RA: -46.30 mas/yr Dec.: 21.26 mas/yr
Parallax (π)	3.01 mas
Distance	4,729 ly (1,450 pc)

Details
Rotation	1.244426522928 s
Age	2.77 Myr

Other designations
- PSR J0628−28, 4U 0628-28

Database references
SIMBAD	data

PSR B0628−28 (also known as PSR J0628−28) is an isolated radio pulsar located in the constellation of Puppis, 4,729 light-years (1.450 parsecs) from Earth. First identified through radio surveys, it stands out among neutron stars due to its anomalously high X-ray emission efficiency relative to its spin-down luminosity, challenging conventional models of pulsar emission. With a spin period of approximately 1.2444 seconds, it holds the distinction of being one of the longest-period pulsars detected in X-rays at the time of its confirmation. As an old field pulsar with a characteristic age of 2.77 million years, PSR B0628−28 lacks a binary companion or association with a supernova remnant. Its multiwavelength emission, characterized by a single-peaked radio profile and a double-peaked X-ray pulse profile, offers critical insights into the magnetospheric processes and potential thermal contributions from the neutron star's surface. The pulsar's properties make it a key subject for studying the long-term evolution and emission mechanisms of rotation-powered pulsars.

== Discovery and observations ==
PSR B0628−28 was first detected in radio wavelengths during pulsar surveys conducted with large radio telescopes, such as the Molonglo Observatory Synthesis Telescope. Its initial identification as a pulsar came from its periodic radio pulses, with subsequent observations refining its period to 1.244426522928 seconds. The pulsar's X-ray counterpart, initially cataloged as RX J0630.8−2834 by the ROSAT mission, was confirmed through high-resolution observations with XMM-Newton and Chandra, which detected pulsed X-ray emission. These observations established PSR B0628−28 as a rare example of a long-period pulsar with significant X-ray output. No optical or gamma-ray counterparts have been detected, with stringent upper limits in the optical bands (V > 26.1 mag, B > 26.3 mag) and no reported detections in Fermi-LAT gamma-ray catalogs as of 2025.

== Significance ==
PSR B0628−28 is a key object for studying the emission mechanisms of aged, rotation-powered pulsars. Its high X-ray efficiency challenges standard magnetospheric models, which predict lower X-ray output for pulsars with low spin-down luminosities. The double-peaked X-ray pulse profile and potential thermal component suggest a complex interplay between magnetospheric non-thermal emission and surface thermal emission from polar caps. The possible detection of cyclotron-like absorption features in the X-ray spectrum could provide insights into the neutron star's magnetic field structure near the surface.

The pulsar's long spin period and lack of timing anomalies (e.g., glitches) make it a stable laboratory for probing the long-term evolution of neutron stars. Its multiwavelength properties, particularly the phase offset between radio and X-ray pulses, offer opportunities to test geometric models of pulsar emission regions. PSR B0628−28's "overluminous" X-ray output also places it in a rare category of pulsars, alongside objects like PSR B1133+16, prompting investigations into whether intrinsic factors (e.g., magnetic field geometry) or external factors (e.g., unaccounted-for distance errors) contribute to this anomaly.

== Research ==
Ongoing studies of PSR B0628−28 focus on refining its X-ray spectral properties and confirming the nature of the potential absorption features. High-resolution X-ray observatories, such as future missions with enhanced sensitivity, could clarify whether these features are cyclotron lines or atmospheric absorption, providing constraints on the neutron star's magnetic field and surface composition. Radio timing campaigns continue to monitor the pulsar for long-term variability, though no glitches or significant timing irregularities have been reported. Multiwavelength campaigns, including deeper optical and gamma-ray searches, may further constrain the pulsar's emission mechanisms and test theoretical models of pulsar magnetospheres.

== See also ==
- Pulsar
