= HD 45184 =

Star in the constellation Canis Major

Observation data Epoch J2000.0 Equinox ICRS
- Constellation: Canis Major
- Right ascension: 06^{h} 24^{m} 43.87951^{s}
- Declination: −28° 46′ 48.4157″
- Apparent magnitude (V): 6.37

Characteristics
- Evolutionary stage: main sequence
- Spectral type: G2Va
- Apparent magnitude (B): 6.996
- Apparent magnitude (J): 5.219
- Apparent magnitude (H): 4.962
- Apparent magnitude (K): 4.871
- B−V color index: 0.626±0.007

Astrometry
Radial velocity (R_{v})	−3.85±0.12 km/s
Proper motion (μ)	RA: −165.122 mas/yr Dec.: −121.852 mas/yr
Parallax (π)	45.6782±0.0166 mas
Distance	71.40 ± 0.03 ly (21.892 ± 0.008 pc)
Absolute magnitude (M_{V})	4.67

Details
Mass	1.08±0.04 M_{☉}
Radius	1.05±0.04 R_{☉}
Luminosity	1.17±0.03 L_{☉}
Surface gravity (log g)	4.47±0.02 cgs
Temperature	5,854±107 K
Metallicity [Fe/H]	0.070±0.016 dex
Rotation	20.0±0.1 d
Rotational velocity (v sin i)	2.1 km/s
Age	3.0+0.7 −1.4 Gyr

Other designations
- CD−29°2981, GJ 3394, HD 45184, HIP 30503, HR 2318, SAO 171711, PPM 250356

Database references
SIMBAD	data
Exoplanet Archive	data

HD 45184 is a star in the southern constellation of Canis Major. It is a yellow-hued star near the lower limit of visibility to the naked eye with an apparent visual magnitude of 6.37. The star is located at a distance of 71.4 light years from the Sun based on parallax. It is drifting closer with a radial velocity of −3.8 km/s.

This object is an ordinary G-type main-sequence star with a stellar classification of G2Va, and it is considered a solar twin. The mass, size, and luminosity of the star are slightly higher than for the Sun, and it has a near solar metallicity – what astronomers term the abundance of elements with higher atomic numbers than helium. The star is around three billion years old and is spinning with a 20-day period. It has a 5.14-year magnetic activity cycle that has a lower amplitude than on the Sun.

== Planetary system ==
HD 45184 has a planet around 12 times as massive as Earth that takes 5.88 days to complete an orbit around its host star. This planet was detected using the radial velocity method. It was later confirmed with Spitzer, whereupon a second candidate planet of similar mass was discovered orbiting with a 13.1 day period. The star was observed by Spitzer for a transit of the inner planet, but no event was detected. Both Neptune-like planets have near circular orbits close to the host star.

An infrared excess has been detected using the Multiband Imaging Photometer for Spitzer at a wavelength of 70 μm, making this a debris disk candidate. Based upon blackbody models, it is orbiting 1.0 AU from the host star with a mean temperature of 280 K. There may be an additional, 60 K debris disk orbiting at a distance of 22.89 AU.

The HD 45184 planetary system
Companion (in order from star)	Mass	Semimajor axis (AU)	Orbital period (days)	Eccentricity	Inclination (°)	Radius
b	≥12.19+1.06 −1.03 M_{🜨}	0.0644+0.0020 −0.0021	5.8854±0.0003	0.07±0.05	—	—
c	≥8.81+1.09 −1.02 M_{🜨}	0.1100+0.0034 −0.0036	13.1354+0.0026 −0.0025	0.07+0.07 −0.05	—	—
