= Zeta Canis Majoris =

Binary star in the constellation Canis Major

- Location of ζ Canis Majoris (circled)

Observation data Epoch J2000.0 Equinox J2000.0
- Constellation: Canis Major
- Right ascension: 06^{h} 20^{m} 18.79204^{s}
- Declination: −30° 03′ 48.1202″
- Apparent magnitude (V): +3.025

Characteristics
- Spectral type: B2.5 V
- U−B color index: −0.71
- B−V color index: −0.195
- Variable type: SPB

Astrometry
Radial velocity (R_{v})	+32.2 km/s
Proper motion (μ)	RA: +7.32 mas/yr Dec.: +4.03 mas/yr
Parallax (π)	9.00±0.13 mas
Distance	362 ± 5 ly (111 ± 2 pc)
Absolute magnitude (M_{V})	−2.21

Orbit
Period (P)	675 days
Eccentricity (e)	0.57
Periastron epoch (T)	2,416,508 JD
Argument of periastron (ω) (secondary)	207°
Semi-amplitude (K_{1}) (primary)	13.5 km/s

Details
Mass	7.7±0.2 M_{☉}
Radius	5.72 (Note: Calculated, using the Stefan-Boltzmann law and the star's effective temperature and luminosity, with respect to the solar nominal effective temperature of 5,772 K: $$\sqrt{\biggl(\frac{5,772}{18,700} \biggr)^4 \cdot 3,603} = 5.72\ R_\odot.$$) R_{☉}
Luminosity	3,603 L_{☉}
Surface gravity (log g)	4.0 cgs
Temperature	18,700 K
Rotational velocity (v sin i)	25 km/s
Age	32.0±0.4 Myr

Other designations
- Furud, Phurud, ζ CMa, Zeta CMa, 1 Canis Majoris, CD−30°3038, FK5 240, GC 8170, HD 44402, HIP 30122, HR 2282, SAO 196698, WDS J06203-3004A

Database references
SIMBAD	data

Zeta Canis Majoris is a binary star system in the southern constellation of Canis Major. Its name is a Bayer designation that is Latinized from ζ Canis Majoris; it has the proper name Furud, pronounced /ˈfjʊərəd/. This system has a combined apparent visual magnitude of +3.0, making it one of the brighter stars in the constellation and hence readily visible to the naked eye. Parallax measurements from the Hipparcos mission yield a distance estimate of around 362 ly (111 pc) from the Sun. It is drifting further away with a radial velocity of +32 km/s.

== Name ==
ζ Canis Majoris, Latinized from Zeta Canis Majoris, is the star's Bayer designation assigned by the German astronomer Johann Bayer in 1603. It is abbreviated Zeta CMa or ζ CMa.

The traditional name Furud or Phurud derives from the Arabic ألفرود al-furūd "the solitary ones". This was an appellation early Arab poets used for a number of anonymous stars. Later Arabian astronomers attempted to identify the name with particular stars, principally in the modern constellations Centaurus and Colomba. The stars of Colomba were assigned to Canis Majoris in the Almagest, leading to more recent assignment of the name for Zeta Canis Majoris.

Al Sufi referred to these stars as ألأغربة al-ʼaghribah "the ravens".

In 2016, the International Astronomical Union organized a Working Group on Star Names (WGSN) to catalog and standardize proper names for stars. The WGSN's first bulletin of July 2016 included a table of the first two batches of names approved by the WGSN; which included Furud for this star.

== Properties ==
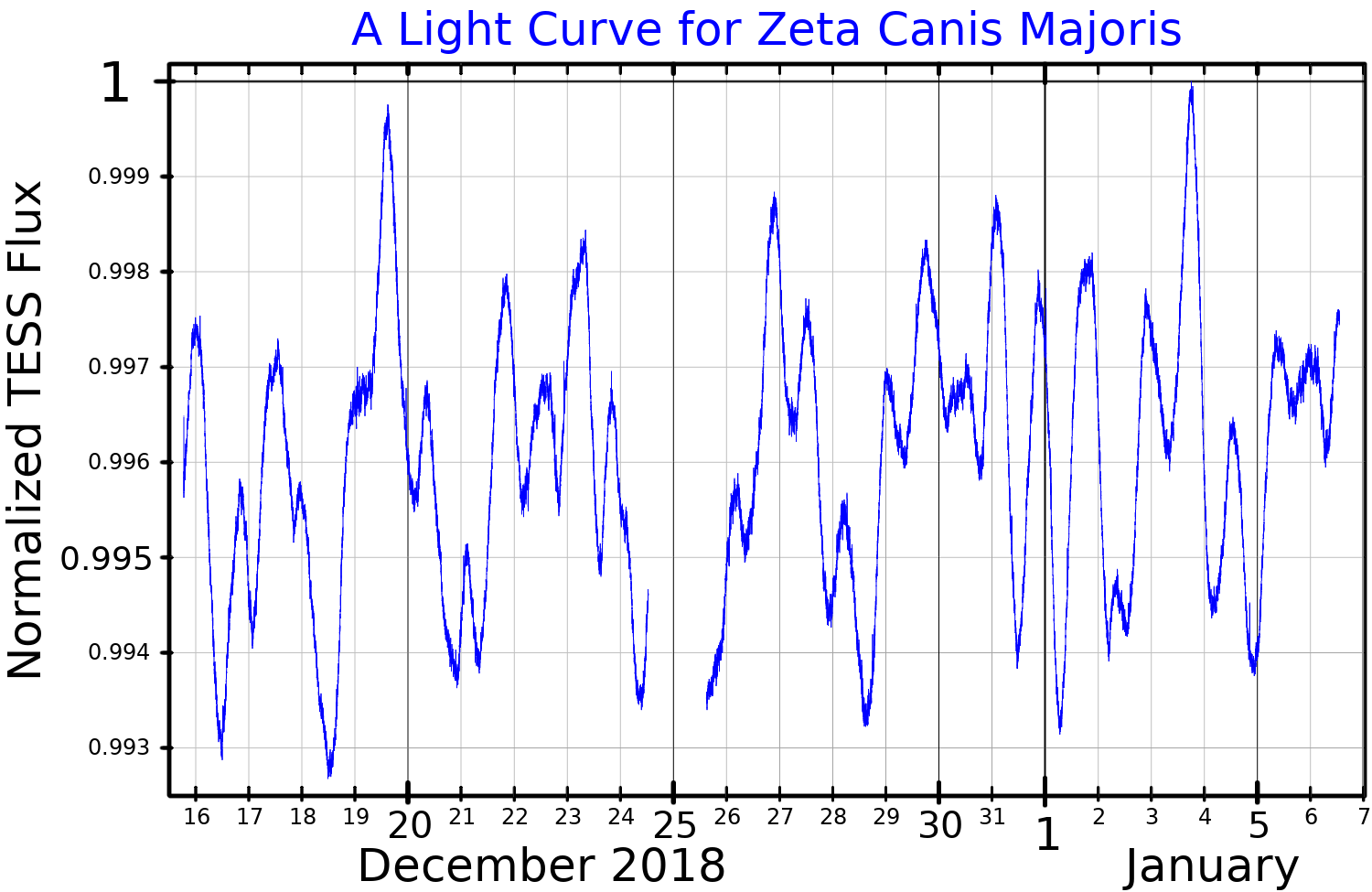
A light curve for Zeta Canis Majoris, plotted from TESS data

The binary nature of this system was first noted by G. E. Paddock based on observations made in 1906 from the D. O. Mills Observatory in Chile. It was confirmed in 1909 by S. A. Mitchell, using radial velocity measurements made by F. E. Harpham in 1908. It is a single-lined spectroscopic binary system, which means that the pair have not been individually resolved with a telescope, but the gravitational perturbations of an unseen astrometric companion can be discerned by shifts in the spectrum of the primary caused by the Doppler effect. The pair orbit around their common center of mass once every 675 days with an eccentricity of 0.57.

The primary component has nearly eight times the mass of the Sun and 5.7 times the Sun's radius. It has a stellar classification of B2.5 V, which means it is a B-type main sequence star that is generating energy through the nuclear fusion of hydrogen at its core. Currently it is about 32 million years old. The star is emitting 3,600 times the luminosity of the Sun, radiating it from its photosphere at an effective temperature of about 18,700 K, giving it the blue-white hue of a B-type star. It was a suspected Beta Cephei variable, until observations with TESS led to its classification as a slowly pulsating B-type star.

Zeta Canis Majoris is located close to the solar antapex.
