= HD 47536 =

Star in the constellation Canis Major

- Location of HD 47536 (circled in red)

Observation data Epoch J2000.0 Equinox ICRS
- Constellation: Canis Major
- Right ascension: 06^{h} 37^{m} 47.61811^{s}
- Declination: −32° 20′ 23.0405″
- Apparent magnitude (V): +5.25

Characteristics
- Evolutionary stage: red giant branch
- Spectral type: K1 III
- B−V color index: +1.177±0.002

Astrometry
Radial velocity (R_{v})	+79.64±0.13 km/s
Proper motion (μ)	RA: +107.755 mas/yr Dec.: +65.122 mas/yr
Parallax (π)	7.9902±0.0535 mas
Distance	408 ± 3 ly (125.2 ± 0.8 pc)
Absolute magnitude (M_{V})	−0.17±0.15

Details
Mass	0.94±0.06 M_{☉}
Radius	23.08+0.68 −0.81 R_{☉}
Luminosity	177.2±2.3 L_{☉}
Surface gravity (log g)	1.72±0.08 cgs
Temperature	4,384+79 −64 K
Metallicity [Fe/H]	−0.68 dex
Rotation	625 days
Rotational velocity (v sin i)	1.93±0.50 km/s
Age	9.33±1.88 Gyr

Other designations
- CD−32°3216, HD 47536, HIP 31688, HR 2447, SAO 197019, GSC 07091-01257

Database references
SIMBAD	data
Exoplanet Archive	data

HD 47536 is a single star in the southern constellation of Canis Major. It has an orange hue and is dimly visible to the naked eye with an apparent visual magnitude of +5.25. The star is located at a distance of approximately 408 light years from the Sun based on parallax. It is drifting further away with a radial velocity of 80 km/s.

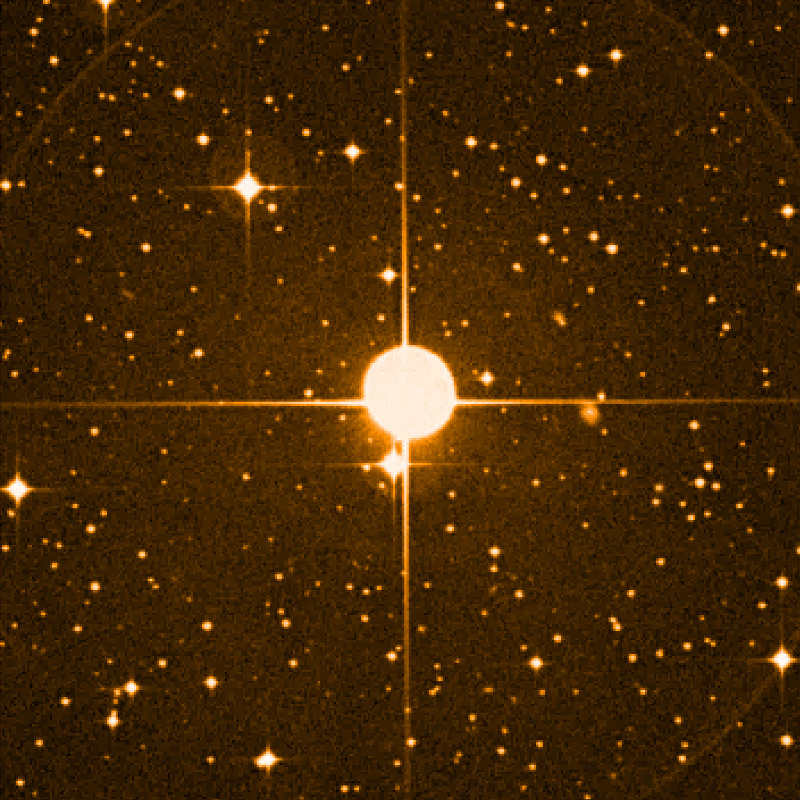
Sky area of 10 x 10 square arcmin around the 6th-magnitude giant star HD 47536. Reproduced from the Digital Sky Survey.

This is an aging, metal-poor giant star with a stellar classification of K1 III. It is about 9.3 billion years old with 94% of the mass of the Sun. Having exhausted the supply of hydrogen at its core, the star cooled and expanded to 23 times the Sun's radius. The star is spinning slowly, taking 1.71 years to complete its sidereal rotation. It is radiating 177 times the luminosity of the Sun from its swollen photosphere at an effective temperature of 4,384 K. As of 2015, at least one planet is known to orbit this star.

== Planetary system ==
A planetary companion to this star, HD 47536 b, was discovered in 2003 by a team led by J. Setiawan. A second planet candidate, HD 47536 c, was proposed in 2007, but was not confirmed by any subsequent study. A follow-up study by Soto et al. in 2015 did not find any evidence of this second planet.

The HD 47536 planetary system
Companion (in order from star)	Mass	Semimajor axis (AU)	Orbital period (days)	Eccentricity	Inclination (°)	Radius
b	≥4.0±0.4 M_{J}	1.12±0.005	434.9±2.6	0.3±0.1	—	—

== See also ==
- HD 122430
- List of extrasolar planets
