= HD 47186 c =

Extrasolar planet in the constellation of Canis Major

Discovery
- Discovered by: Bouchy et al.
- Discovery site: (Chile) La Silla Observatory
- Discovery date: June 16, 2008
- Detection method: Doppler spectroscopy

Orbital characteristics
- Apastron: 2.991 AU (447,400,000 km)
- Periastron: 1.799 AU (269,100,000 km)
- Semi-major axis: 2.395 AU (358,300,000 km)
- Eccentricity: 0.249 ± 0.073
- Orbital period (sidereal): 1353.6 ± 57.1 d 3.7059 ± 0.156 y
- Average orbital speed: 19.31
- Time of periastron: 2,452,010 ± 180
- Star: HD 47186

HD 47186 c is an extrasolar planet orbiting the star HD 47186 in the constellation Canis Major, at a distance of approximately 120–125 ly (37–38 pc) from Earth. The planet has a minimum mass of about 0.35 M_{J} and an orbital period of approximately 1353 days. It orbits its host star at a semimajor axis of about 2.4 AU (360,000,000 km; 220,000,000 mi) and has a moderate orbital eccentricity.

Dynamical studies have shown that HD 47186 c plays a significant role in shaping the architecture of its planetary system. In particular, simulations indicate that additional low-mass planets could maintain stable orbits in regions between the known inner planet and HD 47186 c, including portions of the system’s habitable zone. These results suggest that the system may be capable of hosting yet-undetected terrestrial planets despite the presence of this outer giant planet.
