= HD 57821 =

Star in the constellation Canis Major

Observation data Epoch J2000.0 Equinox J2000.0
- Constellation: Canis Major
- Right ascension: 07^{h} 22^{m} 13.52901^{s}
- Declination: −19° 00′ 59.7646″
- Apparent magnitude (V): 4.94

Characteristics
- Evolutionary stage: Main sequence
- Spectral type: B5 II/III or B7 IV
- B−V color index: −0.039±0.024

Astrometry
Radial velocity (R_{v})	+32.9±1.6 km/s
Proper motion (μ)	RA: −1.69 mas/yr Dec.: +6.91 mas/yr
Parallax (π)	6.78±0.26 mas
Distance	480 ± 20 ly (147 ± 6 pc)
Absolute magnitude (M_{V})	−0.90

Details
Mass	4.12±0.08 M_{☉}
Radius	4.7 R_{☉}
Luminosity	489+43 −40 L_{☉}
Temperature	12,445±86 K
Rotational velocity (v sin i)	116 km/s
Age	291 Myr

Other designations
- BD−18°1806, FK5 2570, HD 57821, HIP 35727, HR 2812, SAO 152776

Database references
SIMBAD	data

HD 57821 is a single star in the southern constellation of Canis Major. It has a blue-white hue and is faintly visible to the naked eye with an apparent visual magnitude of 4.94. Based on parallax measurements, the distance to this object is approximately 480 light years. It is drifting further away with a radial velocity of +33 km/s, having come to within 71 light-years some 4.3 million years ago.

The stellar classification of this star is B5 II/III, which matches the spectrum of a giant/bright giant although stellar models suggest it may still be on the main sequence. It has over four times the mass of the Sun and is 291 million years old. The star has a high rate of spin, showing a projected rotational velocity of 116 km/s. It is radiating around 489 times the luminosity of the Sun from its photosphere at an effective temperature of 12,445 K.
