= HD 43197 b =

Extrasolar planet in the constellation Canis Major

HD 43197 b / Equiano
Discovery
- Discovered by: Naef et al.
- Discovery site: La Silla Observatory
- Discovery date: October 19, 2009
- Detection method: radial velocity (HARPS)

Orbital characteristics
- Semi-major axis: 0.882+0.035 −0.039 AU
- Eccentricity: 0.742+0.017 −0.018
- Orbital period (sidereal): 308.9+2.3 −2.8 d
- Time of periastron: 2452535.102+17.503 −14.898
- Argument of periastron: 268.525°+3.824° −4.523°
- Semi-amplitude: 25.439+1.472 −1.121 m/s
- Star: HD 43197

Physical characteristics
- Mass: ≥0.553+0.052 −0.048 M_{J}

HD 43197 b is an extrasolar planet which orbits the G-type main sequence or subgiant star HD 43197, located approximately 204 light years away in the constellation Canis Major. This planet has a minimum mass 55% that of Jupiter and takes 0.85 years to orbit the star at a semimajor axis of 0.882 AU. It has a high eccentricity of 0.74, but its inclination is not known. This planet was detected by HARPS on October 19, 2009, together with 29 other planets.

In 2022, a second super-Jovian planet was discovered orbiting HD 43197 using a combination of radial velocity and astrometry. Assuming HD 43197 b shares the outer planet's orbital inclination, its true mass would be about 4 M_{J}.

The planet HD 43197 b is named Equiano. The name was selected in the NameExoWorlds campaign by Nigeria, during the 100th anniversary of the IAU. Olaudah Equiano was a writer and abolitionist from Ihiala, Nigeria who fought injustice and for the elimination of the slave trade.
