= FR Canis Majoris =

Variable Star in constellation Canis Major

- Location of FR Canis Majoris (circled in red)

Observation data Epoch J2000.0 Equinox J2000.0
- Constellation: Canis Major
- Right ascension: 06^{h} 21^{m} 24.72^{s}
- Declination: −11° 46′ 23.7″
- Apparent magnitude (V): 5.43 - 5.64

Characteristics
- Evolutionary stage: main sequence
- Spectral type: B1.5IVe

Astrometry
Radial velocity (R_{v})	+19.7±0.2 km/s
Proper motion (μ)	RA: −2.273 mas/yr Dec.: +1.193 mas/yr
Parallax (π)	1.8635±0.0597 mas
Distance	1,750 ± 60 ly (540 ± 20 pc)
Absolute magnitude (M_{V})	−2.7

Orbit
Period (P)	322.1±1.7 days
Semi-amplitude (K_{1}) (primary)	5.1±0.3 km/s

Details

A
Mass	10.7 M_{☉}
Radius	7.9 R_{☉}
Luminosity	11,194 L_{☉}
Surface gravity (log g)	3.97 cgs
Temperature	23,878 K
Rotation	0.924 days
Rotational velocity (v sin i)	232 km/s
Age	14.5 Myr

B
Mass	0.8–1.3 M_{☉}

Other designations
- FR CMa, BD−11 1460, HD 44458, HIP 30214, HR 2284, SAO 151401, TIC 443126408, TYC 5371-2101-1, IRAS 06190-1144, 2MASS J06212472-1146236

Database references
SIMBAD	data

FR Canis Majoris (FR CMa) is a binary star located in the constellation of Canis Major. According to the new reduction of parallax data from the Hipparcos satellite, it is located approximately 1,750 light-years from the solar system.

== Observations ==
The primary component of FR Canis Majoris is a blue-white main-sequence star of spectral type B1.5IVe. With an effective temperature of 23,878 K, its luminosity is over 10,000 times greater than that of the Sun. It rotates with a projected rotational velocity, the lower limit of its real equatorial rotation speed, of 232 km/s, its rotational axis being inclined at 48° with respect to the observer on Earth. It has a mass of about 11 solar masses, thus being above the limit beyond which stars violently end their lives by exploding as supernovae. Its age is estimated at 14.5 million years, which represents 83% of its main-sequence life. It is a Be star and also a Gamma Cassiopeiae variable, eruptive variables that show irregular variations in their luminosity caused by the expulsion of matter with a variation amplitude of 0.116 magnitudes.

It has an absolute magnitude of −2.7 and its positive radial velocity indicates that the star is moving away from the solar system.

=== Companions ===
FR Canis Majoris is a spectroscopic binary, first suspected in 2022 and confirmed in 2026. The orbital solution remains tentative, with a period of 322 days.

There is also a magnitude 9.7 companion, 4.2 arcseconds distant and with a position angle of 23 degrees, which may actually be gravitationally bound to it. Another star of 11th magnitude is 56.5 arcseconds distant, but it may only be in the line of sight to Earth and is not bound to the main star.
