= Omega Canis Majoris =

Star in the constellation Canis Major

ω Canis Majoris
- Location of ω Canis Majoris (circled)

Observation data Epoch J2000.0 Equinox J2000.0 (ICRS)
- Constellation: Canis Major
- Right ascension: 07^{h} 14^{m} 48.654^{s}
- Declination: −26° 46′ 21.60″
- Apparent magnitude (V): 3.60 to 4.18

Characteristics
- Spectral type: B2.5Ve
- U−B color index: −0.73
- B−V color index: −0.14
- Variable type: γ Cas

Astrometry
Radial velocity (R_{v})	23.2±2.4 km/s
Proper motion (μ)	RA: −11.617 mas/yr Dec.: +8.109 mas/yr
Parallax (π)	3.5610±0.1524 mas
Distance	920 ± 40 ly (280 ± 10 pc)
Absolute magnitude (M_{V})	−3.21

Details
Mass	10.1±0.7 M_{☉}
Radius	6.2 R_{☉}
Luminosity	13,081 L_{☉}
Surface gravity (log g)	3.5 cgs
Temperature	21,878 K
Rotational velocity (v sin i)	80 km/s
Age	22.5±2.6 Myr

Other designations
- ω CMa, 28 Canis Majoris, CD−26°4073, GC 9625, HD 56139, HIP 35037, HR 2749, SAO 173282

Database references
SIMBAD	data

Omega Canis Majoris is a solitary, blue-white-hued star in the equatorial constellation of Canis Major. Its name is a Bayer designation that is Latinized from ω Canis Majoris, and abbreviated Omega CMa or ω CMa. This star is visible to the naked eye with an apparent visual magnitude of about 4. Based upon an annual parallax shift of 3.56 mas as seen from Earth, this system is located roughly 920 light-years (280 pc) away from the Sun. It is drifting further away with a line of sight velocity of 23 km/s.

== Properties ==
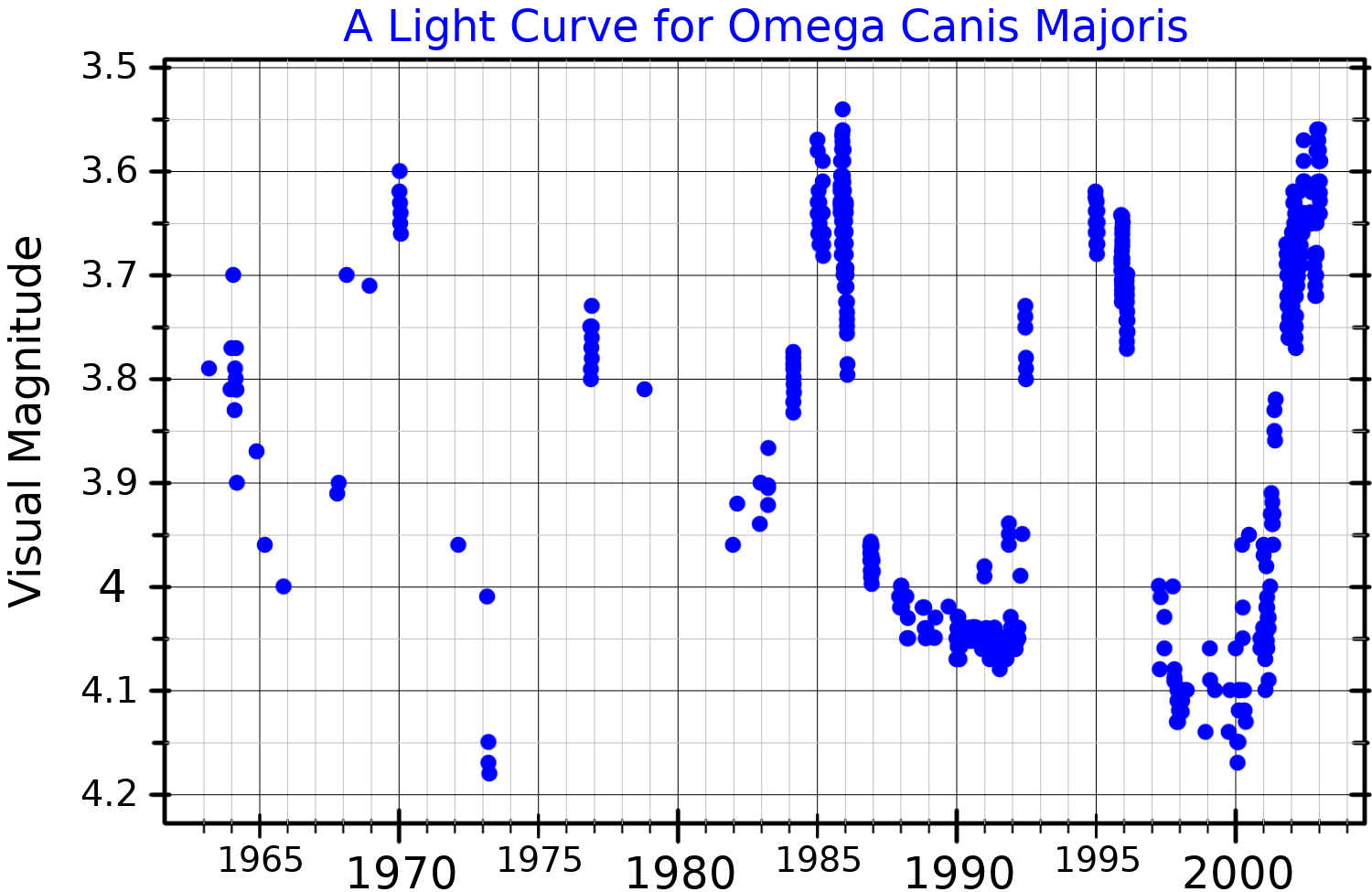
A visual band light curve for Omega Canis Majoris, adapted from Štefl et al. (2003)

This star has a stellar classification of B2.5Ve, indicating it is a main sequence Be star, although it has also been classified as a subgiant. One of the most observed Be stars of the Southern Hemisphere, Omega Canis Majoris is classified as a Gamma Cassiopeiae-type variable star. Both the luminosity and the radial velocity vary with a primary cyclical period of 1.372 days. The variation in brightness, ranging from magnitude +3.60 to +4.18, shows changes over time, which suggests there are two overlapping periods of 1.37 and 1.49 days. The star also undergoes transient periodicities following outbursts.

This is a massive star with ten times the mass of the Sun and 6.2 times the Sun's radius. At an estimated age of 22.5 million years, it is radiating 13,081 times the Sun's luminosity from its photosphere at an effective temperature of 21,878 K. The star is being viewed nearly pole on, so the measured projected rotational velocity of 80 km/s is only a fraction of the true equatorial velocity, estimated as 350 km/s. It is surrounded by a symmetric circumstellar decretion disk of material that is being heated by the star, which in turn is inserting emission lines into the combined spectrum.
