= De systemate orbis cometici, deque admirandis coeli characteribus =

Work by Giovanni Battista Hodierna

De systemate orbis cometici, deque admirandis coeli characteribus (transl. Of the systematics of the world of comets, and on the admirable objects of the sky) is a small tract on comets and other celestial objects by the Sicilian astronomer Giovanni Battista Hodierna published in 1654. It contains a catalogue of comets and other celestial objects, but had limited circulation and the work was forgotten until 1985. In this work, Hodierna expressed the belief that comets were made of a more terrestrial substance, and considered nebulae to be made up of stars (Lux Primogenita).

== Scope ==
The first part of his work (De systemate orbis cometici) followed Galileo's ideas on comets. The second part (De admirandis coeli characteribus) consisted of four main sections. The first concerns the classification of nebulas. Hodierna classified the objects into three types according to their resolvability. Luminosae, or star clusters to the naked eye, Nebulae, or clusters that appeared nebulous to the naked eye, but which were resolvable in his telescope, and Occultae, which did not resolve even with the aid of his telescope. The second part is a list of 40 nebulae, of which roughly 25 have been identified as known objects, the others having too unclear a description for a modern identification. The third section is an attempt at a unifying theory of celestial objects, and the fourth concerns Copernican heliocentrism.

== Discoveries ==
Hodernia is credited with several first descriptions, discoveries and rediscoveries:

Original discoveries

- Alpha Persei Moving Cluster
- M6
- M8
- M36
- M37
- M38
- M41
- M47
- NGC 2362
- NGC 6231

Probable original discoveries

- M33
- M34
- NGC 752

Possible original discoveries

- NGC 2169
- NGC 2175
- NGC 2451

Independent rediscoveries

- M31
- M42
- Brocchi's Cluster

These discoveries were part of an attempt at compiling a sky atlas, Il Cielo Stellato Diviso in 100 Mappe, but the work was never completed.
