= QX Andromedae =

Eclipsing binary star system in the constellation Andromeda

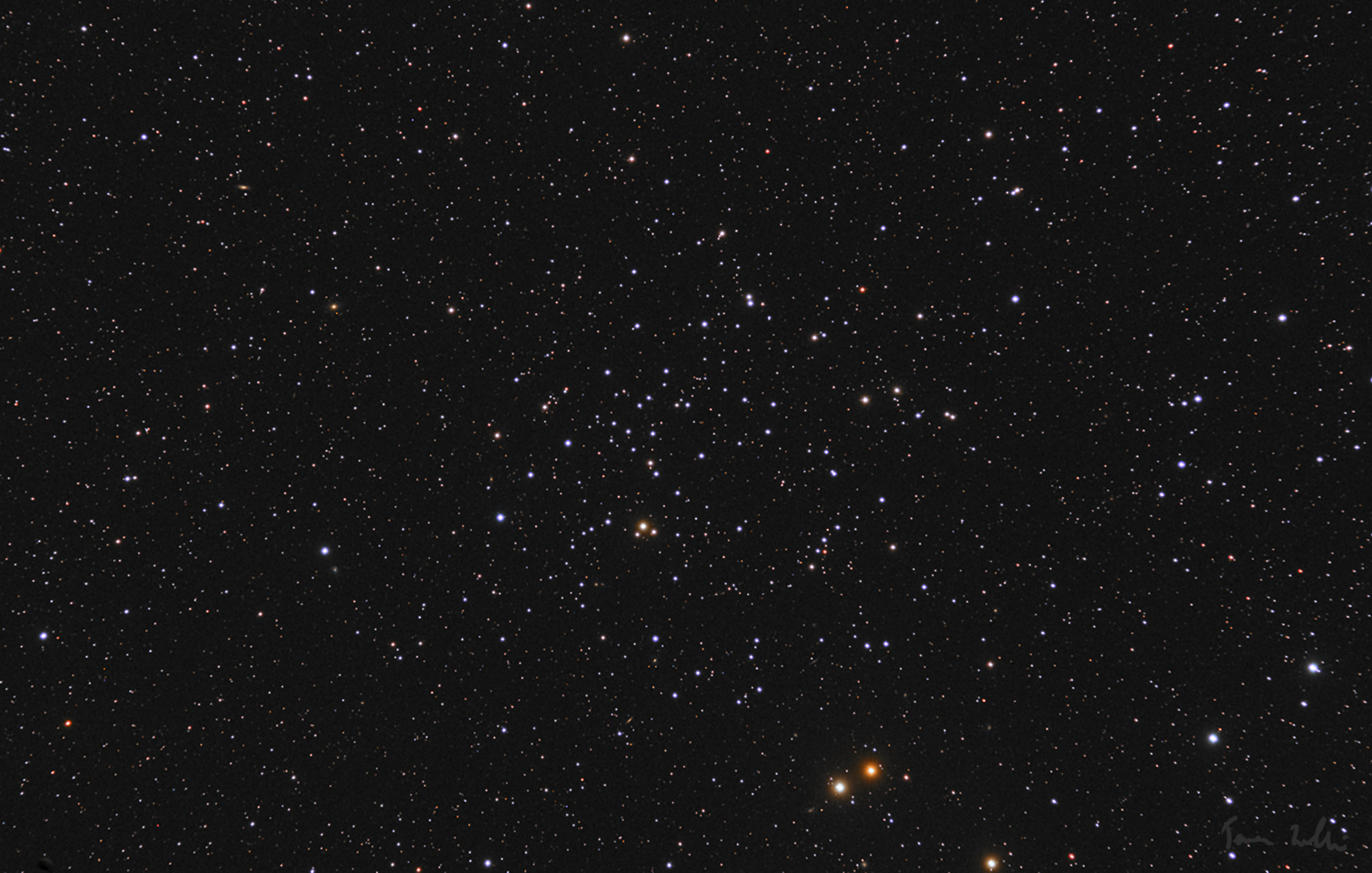
- Location of QX Andromedae (circled) in NGC 752

Observation data Epoch J2000 Equinox ICRS
- Constellation: Andromeda
- Right ascension: 01^{h} 57^{m} 57.7818^{s}
- Declination: +37° 48′ 22.450″
- Apparent magnitude (V): 11.28 – 11.5 variable

Characteristics
- Spectral type: F6
- Apparent magnitude (B): 11.77
- Apparent magnitude (R): 11.23
- Apparent magnitude (G): 11.2929
- Apparent magnitude (J): 10.393
- Apparent magnitude (H): 10.225
- Apparent magnitude (K): 10.163
- Variable type: W UMa

Astrometry
Radial velocity (R_{v})	11.70±0.27 km/s
Proper motion (μ)	RA: 10.016±1.295 mas/yr Dec.: −11.926±0.281 mas/yr
Parallax (π)	2.2376±0.0676 mas
Distance	1,460 ± 40 ly (450 ± 10 pc)

Orbit
Period (P)	0.4121716 days
Semi-major axis (a)	2.89±0.04 M_{☉}
Inclination (i)	54.6±0.2°

Details

Primary
Mass	1.47±0.05 M_{☉}
Radius	1.46±0.02 R_{☉}
Surface gravity (log g)	4.27±0.03 cgs
Temperature	6,440 K
Age	1.34±0.06 Gyr

Secondary
Mass	0.45±0.02 M_{☉}
Radius	0.88±0.02 R_{☉}
Surface gravity (log g)	4.20±0.03 cgs
Temperature	6420±20 K
Age	1.34±0.06 Gyr

Other designations
- 2MASS J01575777+3748224, RX J015758.0+374820, TYC 2816-1950-1

Database references
SIMBAD	data

QX Andromedae (often abbreviated to QX And) is an eclipsing binary in the constellation Andromeda. It varies from a maximum apparent visual magnitude of 11.28 to a minimum of 11.50. Since it is impossible to specify the onset time of the eclipses, it is classified as a W Ursae Majoris variable star. It is also observed as an X-ray source and is a member of the open cluster NGC 752.

== System ==
As a whole, the QX Andromedae system emits light like a stellar blackbody, with a F6 spectral type. The two stars in the system complete an orbit every 9.892 hours; they are so close that their envelopes are touching each other. Their temperature is similar, but they have different radius and mass. Since they belong to an open cluster, the age of this system is equal to the cluster estimated age (1.34±0.06 billion years).

== Variability ==
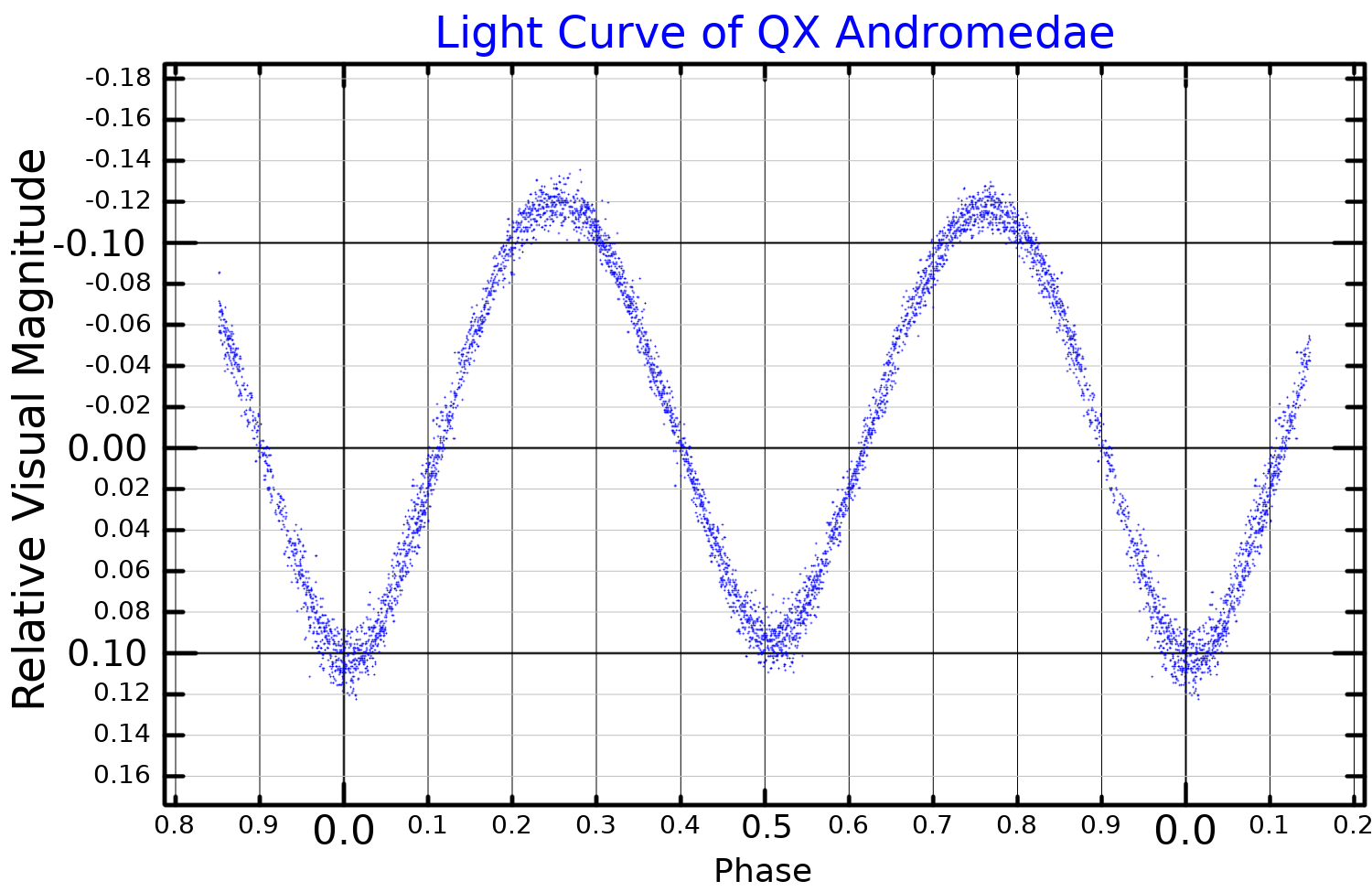
A visual band light curve of QX Andromedae, adapted from Ren et al. (2011)

The light curve of QX Andromedae shows almost equal eclipses; the primary eclipse occurs when the less massive star pass in front of the other one. The brightness variations are rather small for this system given the low orbital inclination of 55°.
