= DS Andromedae =

Eclipsing binary star in the constellation Andromeda

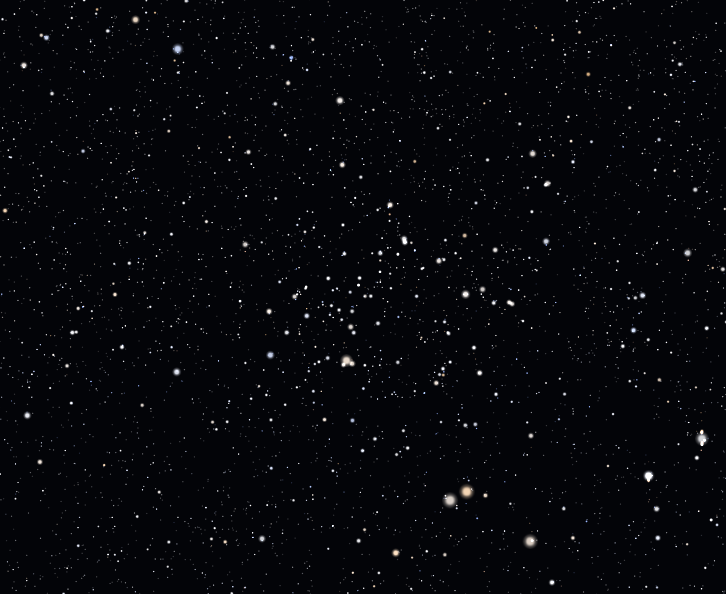
- Location of DS Andromedae in NGC 752 (circled)

Observation data Epoch J2000 Equinox ICRS
- Constellation: Andromeda
- Right ascension: 01^{h} 57^{m} 46.0561^{s}
- Declination: +38° 04′ 28.431″
- Apparent magnitude (V): 10.44 – 10.93 variable

Characteristics
- Spectral type: F3IV-V + G0V
- Apparent magnitude (B): 10.89
- Apparent magnitude (V): 10.52
- Apparent magnitude (G): 10.4555
- Apparent magnitude (J): 9.653
- Apparent magnitude (H): 9.481
- Apparent magnitude (K): 9.407
- Variable type: Algol

Astrometry
Radial velocity (R_{v})	2.5±2.0 km/s
Proper motion (μ)	RA: 10.172±0.082 mas/yr Dec.: 11.78±0.08 mas/yr
Parallax (π)	2.1968±0.0404 mas
Distance	1,480 ± 30 ly (455 ± 8 pc)

Orbit
Period (P)	1.0105188 days
Semi-major axis (a)	5.77 R_{☉}
Eccentricity (e)	0
Inclination (i)	84.3°
Periastron epoch (T)	HJD 2,436,142.405
Semi-amplitude (K_{1}) (primary)	110 km/s
Semi-amplitude (K_{2}) (secondary)	180 km/s

Details

Primary
Mass	1.58±0.17 M_{☉}
Radius	2.10±0.08 R_{☉}
Luminosity	8.3 L_{☉}
Temperature	6,775 K
Age	2 Gyr

Secondary
Mass	0.94±0.10 M_{☉}
Radius	1.19±0.05 R_{☉}
Luminosity	1.6 L_{☉}
Temperature	5,997 K
Age	2 Gyr

Other designations
- 2MASS J01574604+3804284, BD+37 435, TYC 2816-2203-1

Database references
SIMBAD	data

DS Andromedae (often abbreviated to DS And) is an eclipsing binary star in the constellation Andromeda and a member of the open cluster NGC 752. Its maximum apparent visual magnitude is 10.44, but drops down to 10.93 during the main eclipse and to 10.71 during the secondary one.

== System ==
The primary star has a spectral classification F3IV-V, matching the evidence for a star that is evolving off the main sequence and is expanding its radius. The secondary is thought to be a main sequence star with spectral type G0. It is not visible in the spectrum of DS Andromedae, but the temperature and spectral type can be estimated from the difference in brightness of the two components, determined from the eclipses. The two components are modelled to have apparent magnitudes of 10.62 and 12.47 respectively.

The age of DS Andromedae appears to be very close to the hook at the end of main sequence phase of evolution and has just reached the subgiant branch. Its age can be determined at 2.0±0.2 Gyr from the NGC 752 main sequence turnoff and this allows its physical properties to be accurately calculated. It appears to be not quite filling its roche lobe and no mass transfer has taken place between the two stars; they are evolving as isolated stars.

== Variability ==
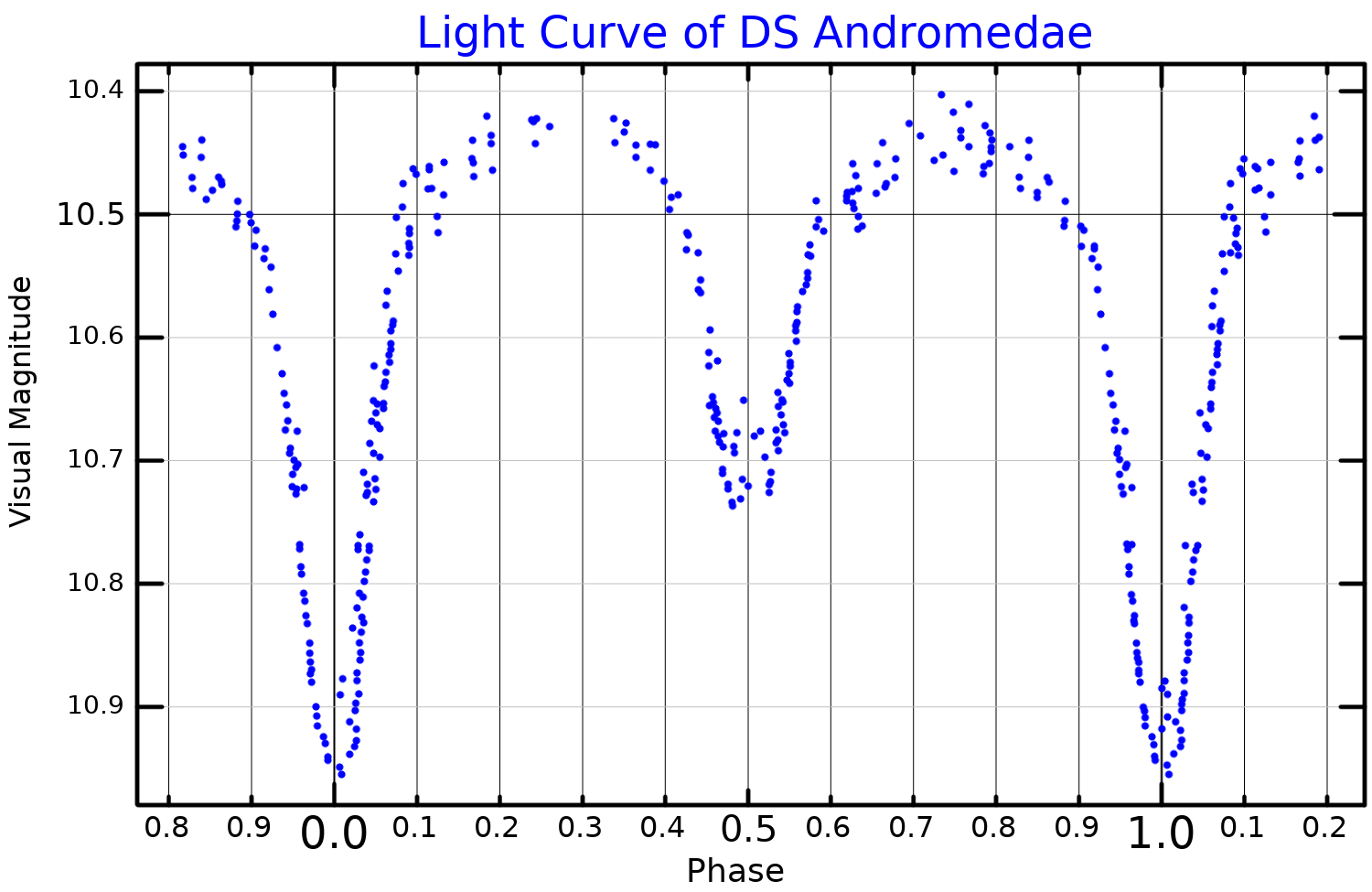
The light curve for DS Andromedae, adapted from Milone et al.

A. Alksnis discovered the variability of DS Andromedae's brightness in 1957, by measuring 60 photographic plates. The light curve of the star shows a main eclipse when the secondary star passes in front of the primary, and a secondary eclipse when the opposite occurs. This cycle repeats with a periodicity slightly over one day. Since the system is almost exactly edge-on the secondary eclipse is total, and allows the determination of the spectral type of the secondary component. The primary eclipse is annular as the smaller secondary passes in front of the hotter brighter primary.

It is classified as an Algol variable (detached) star in the General Catalogue of Variable Stars, but is sometimes considered to be a β Lyrae variable (contact).
