= HD 56405 =

Star in the constellation Canis Major

- Location of HD 56405 (circled)

Observation data Epoch J2000 Equinox ICRS
- Constellation: Canis Major
- Right ascension: 07^{h} 16^{m} 14.55266^{s}
- Declination: −15° 35′ 08.4862″
- Apparent magnitude (V): 5.45

Characteristics
- Evolutionary stage: main sequence
- Spectral type: A1V
- B−V color index: 0.079±0.005

Astrometry
Radial velocity (R_{v})	+6.30±0.9 km/s
Proper motion (μ)	RA: −45.415 mas/yr Dec.: −14.578 mas/yr
Parallax (π)	12.9537±0.0714 mas
Distance	252 ± 1 ly (77.2 ± 0.4 pc)
Absolute magnitude (M_{V})	0.88

Details
Mass	2.13 M_{☉}
Radius	2.47 R_{☉}
Luminosity	38.86 L_{☉}
Surface gravity (log g)	4.14±0.14 cgs
Temperature	9,562±325 K
Rotational velocity (v sin i)	149 km/s
Age	212 Myr

Other designations
- BD−15°1734, FK5 2561, GC 9657, GJ 9228, HD 56405, HIP 35180, HR 2758, SAO 152641, TYC 5965-363-1

Database references
SIMBAD	data

HD 56405 is a star in the southern constellation of Canis Major. It is white in hue and is dimly visible to the naked eye with an apparent visual magnitude of 5.45. To the east of HD 56405 is the open cluster NGC 2360, also known as Caroline's Cluster. The distance to HD 56405, as determined from parallax measurements, is approximately 252 light years. It is drifting further away with a radial velocity (RV) of about +6 km/s. Although classed as a single star, it is to suspected to vary in RV.

This is an A-type main-sequence star with a stellar classification of A1V. It was classed as a candidate Lambda Boötis star, but as of 2015 this classification has been rejected by astronomers due to the star having an inconsistent UV flux, possible RV variability, and a fairly high rotation rate. The star is about 212 million years old with 2.13 times the mass of the Sun and is spinning with a projected rotational velocity of 149 km/s. It is radiating 39 times the luminosity of the Sun from its photosphere at an effective temperature of around 9,562 K.
