= Messier 50 =

Open cluster in the constellation Monoceros

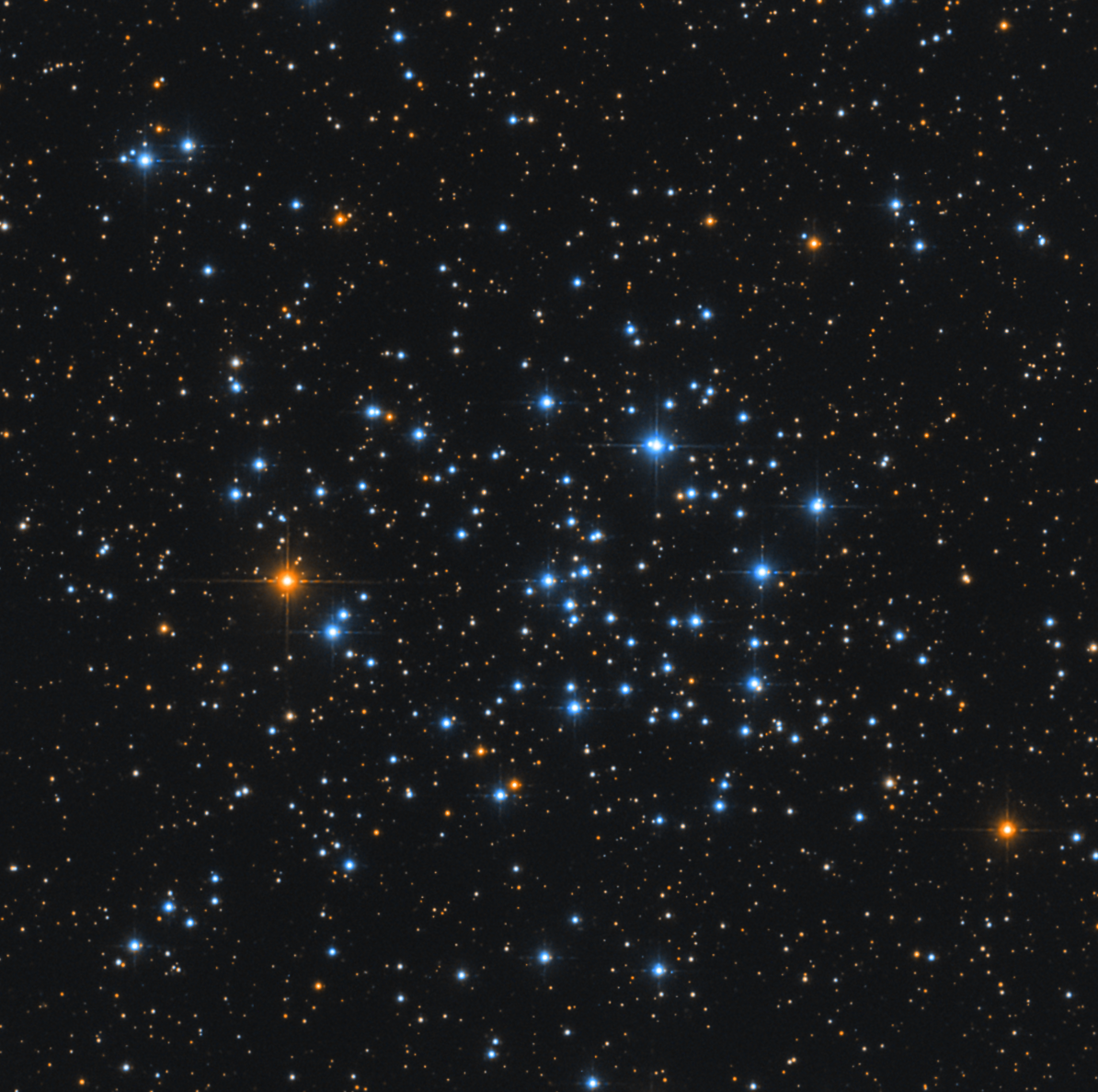
- Open Messier 50 in Monoceros

Observation data (J2000 epoch)
- Right ascension: 07^{h} 02^{m} 47.5^{s}
- Declination: −08° 20′ 16″ (Note: Eight out of ninety degrees south of the celestial equator. Thus its light reaches all parts of the Earth, down to a good minimal cumulation 15° above the horizon, on the unobstructed southern horizons of the 67th parallel north. This rules out Iceland and the north coasts of the two northernmost continents.)
- Distance: 2,870 ly (881 pc)
- Apparent magnitude (V): 5.9
- Apparent dimensions (V): 16.0′

Physical characteristics
- Mass: > 285 M_{☉} M_{☉}
- Radius: 8.9 ly (2.73 pc)
- Estimated age: 158 Myr
- Other designations: M50, NGC 2323, Cr 124, C 0700-082, OCl 559

Associations
- Constellation: Monoceros

Messier 50 or M 50, also known as NGC 2323 or the Heart-shaped Cluster, is an open cluster of stars in the constellation Monoceros. It was recorded by G. D. Cassini before 1711 and independently discovered by Charles Messier in 1772 (Note: On 5 April) while observing Biela's Comet. It is sometimes described as a 'heart-shaped' figure or a blunt arrowhead.

M50 is about 2,900 light-years away from Earth and is near to but narrowly not estimated to be gravitationally tied to the Canis Major (CMa) OB1 association. It has a core radius of 5.9 ly (1.8 pc) and spans 17.8 ly (5.46 pc). The cluster has 508 confirmed and 109 probable members – their combined mass is more than 285 M_{☉}, the mean stellar density would thus be 1.3 stars per cubic parsec. It is around 140 million years old, with two high-mass white dwarfs and two chemically peculiar stars.

Traditionally considered to be a single star cluster, in 2025 it was found to consist of two separate sub-clusters (NGC 2323-a and NGC 2323-b), making it a binary cluster.

== Gallery ==
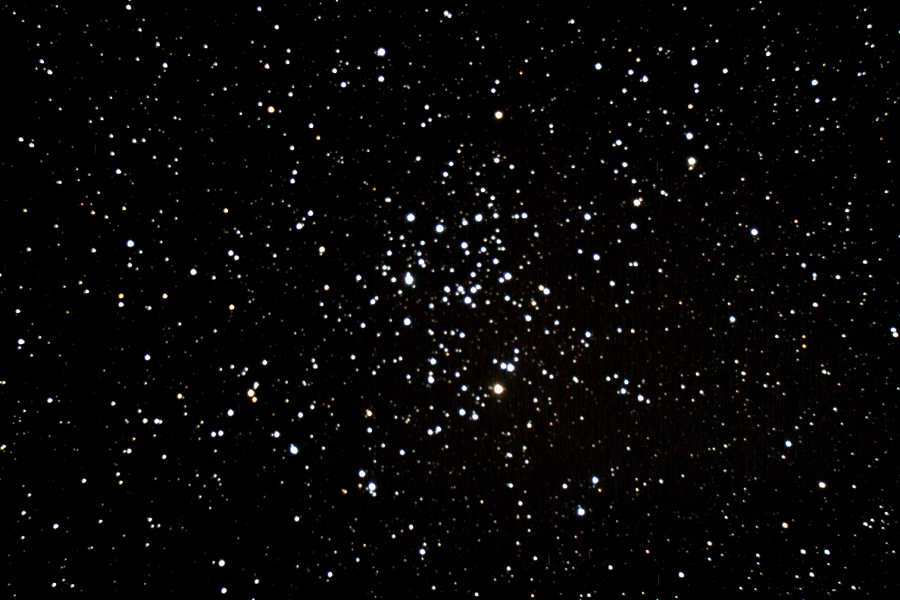
Open Messier 50 in Monoceros

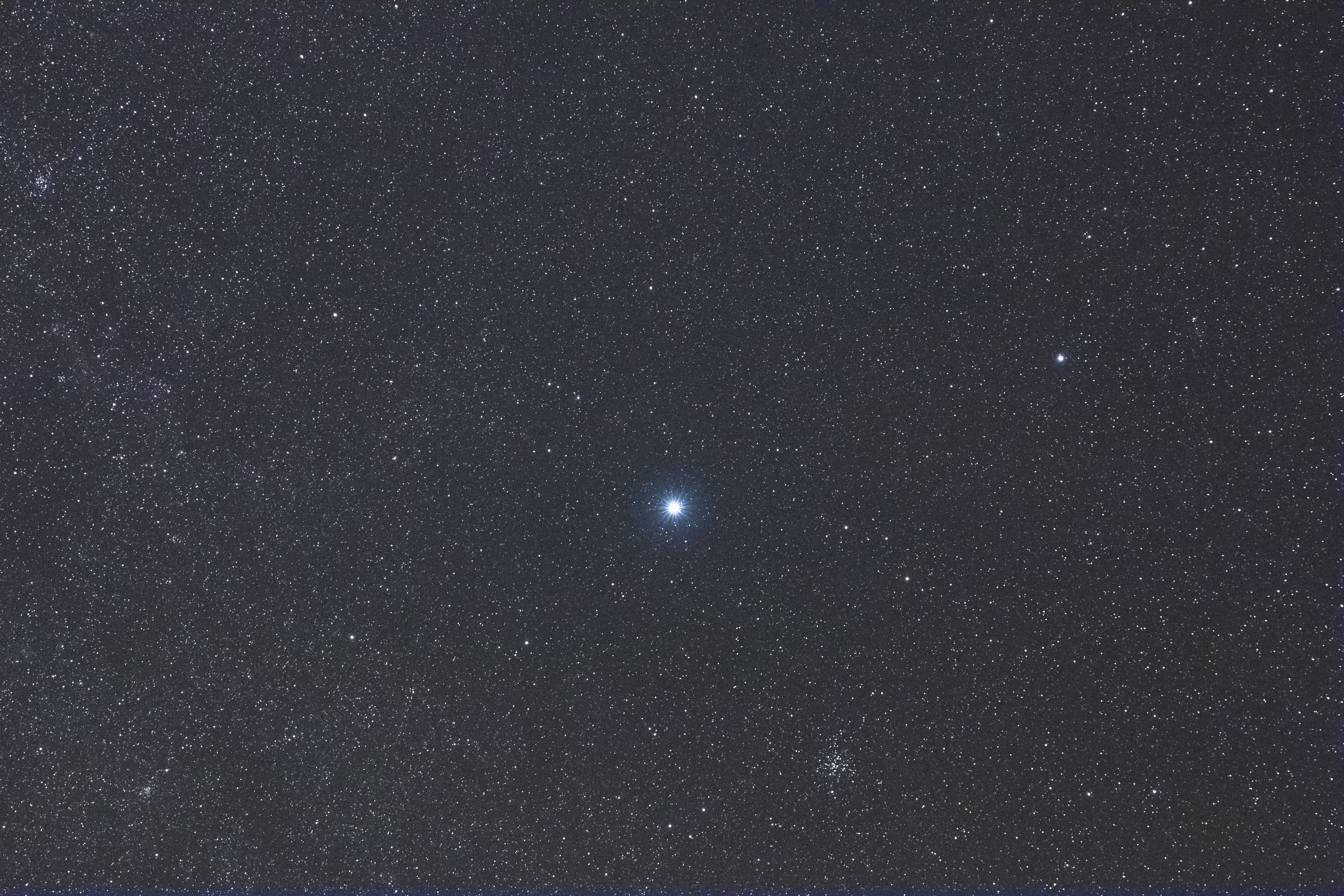
Sirius and M41 (lower right), M50 (upper left), and NGC 2360 (lower left)

Messier 50 is found 8° north and 3° east of Sirius

== See also ==
- List of Messier objects
