= Messier 34 =

Open cluster in constellation Perseus

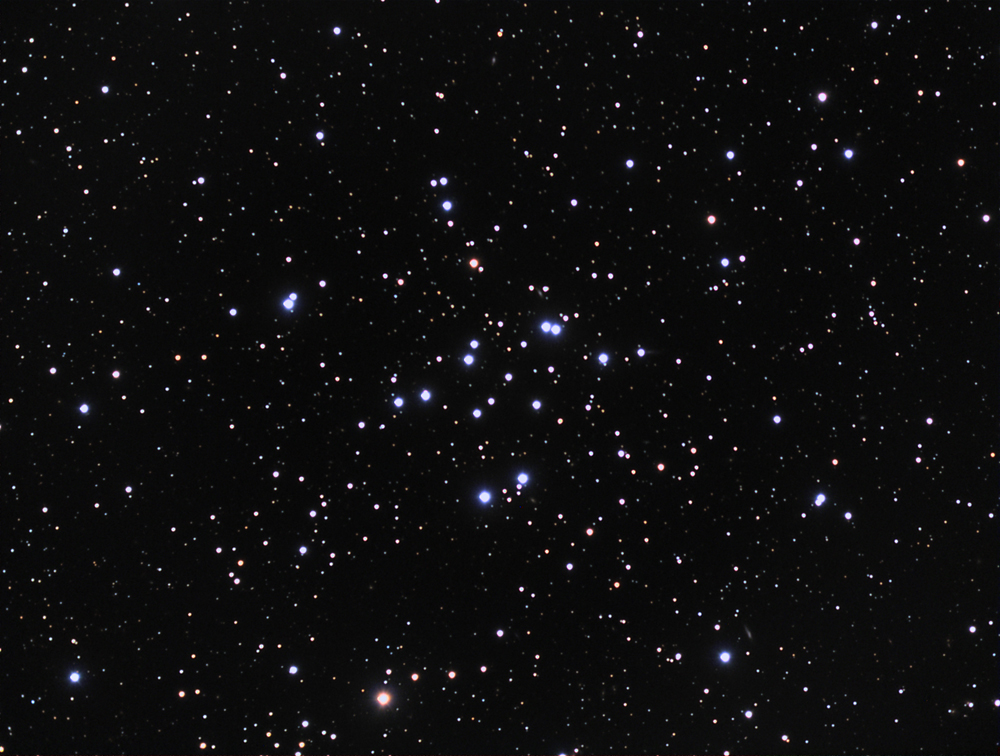
- Open cluster Messier 34 in Perseus

Observation data (J2000.0 epoch)
- Right ascension: 02^{h} 42.1^{m}
- Declination: +42° 46′
- Distance: 1,500 light years (470 pc)
- Apparent magnitude (V): 5.5
- Apparent dimensions (V): 35.0′

Physical characteristics
- Radius: 7 ly
- Estimated age: 200–250 million years
- Other designations: NGC 1039, Cr 31, OCl 382, C 0238+425

Associations
- Constellation: Perseus

Messier 34 (also known as M34, NGC 1039, or the Spiral Cluster) is a large and relatively near open cluster in Perseus. It was probably discovered by Giovanni Batista Hodierna before 1654 and included by Charles Messier in his catalog of comet-like objects in 1764. Messier described it as, "A cluster of small stars a little below the parallel of γ (Andromedae). In an ordinary telescope of 3 feet one can distinguish the stars."

Based on the distance modulus of 8.38, it is about 470 parsecs (1,500 ly) away. For stars ranging from 0.12 to 1 solar mass (M_{☉}), the cluster has about 400. It spans about 35′ on the sky which translates to a true radius of 7.5 light years at such distance. The cluster is just visible to the naked eye in very dark conditions, well away from city lights. It is possible to see it in binoculars when light pollution is low.

The age of this cluster lies between the ages of the Pleiades open cluster at 100 million years and the Hyades open cluster at 800 million years. Specifically, comparison between noted stellar spectra and the values predicted by stellar evolutionary models suggest 200–250 million years. This is roughly the age at which stars with half a solar mass enter the main sequence. By comparison, stars like the Sun enter the main sequence after 30 million years.

The average proportion of elements with higher atomic numbers than helium is termed the metallicity by astronomers. This is expressed by the logarithm of the ratio of iron to hydrogen, compared to the same proportion in the Sun. For M34, the metallicity has a value of [Fe/H] = +0.07 ± 0.04. This is equivalent to a 17% higher proportion of iron compared to the Sun. Other elements show a similar abundance, save for nickel which is underabundant.

At least 19 members are white dwarfs. These are stellar remnants of progenitor stars of up to eight solar masses (M_{☉}) that have evolved through the main sequence and are no longer have thermonuclear fusion to generate energy. Seventeen of these are of spectral type DA or DAZ, while one is a type DB and the last is a type DC.

== See also ==
- List of Messier objects
