= NGC 2175 =

Open cluster in the constellation Orion

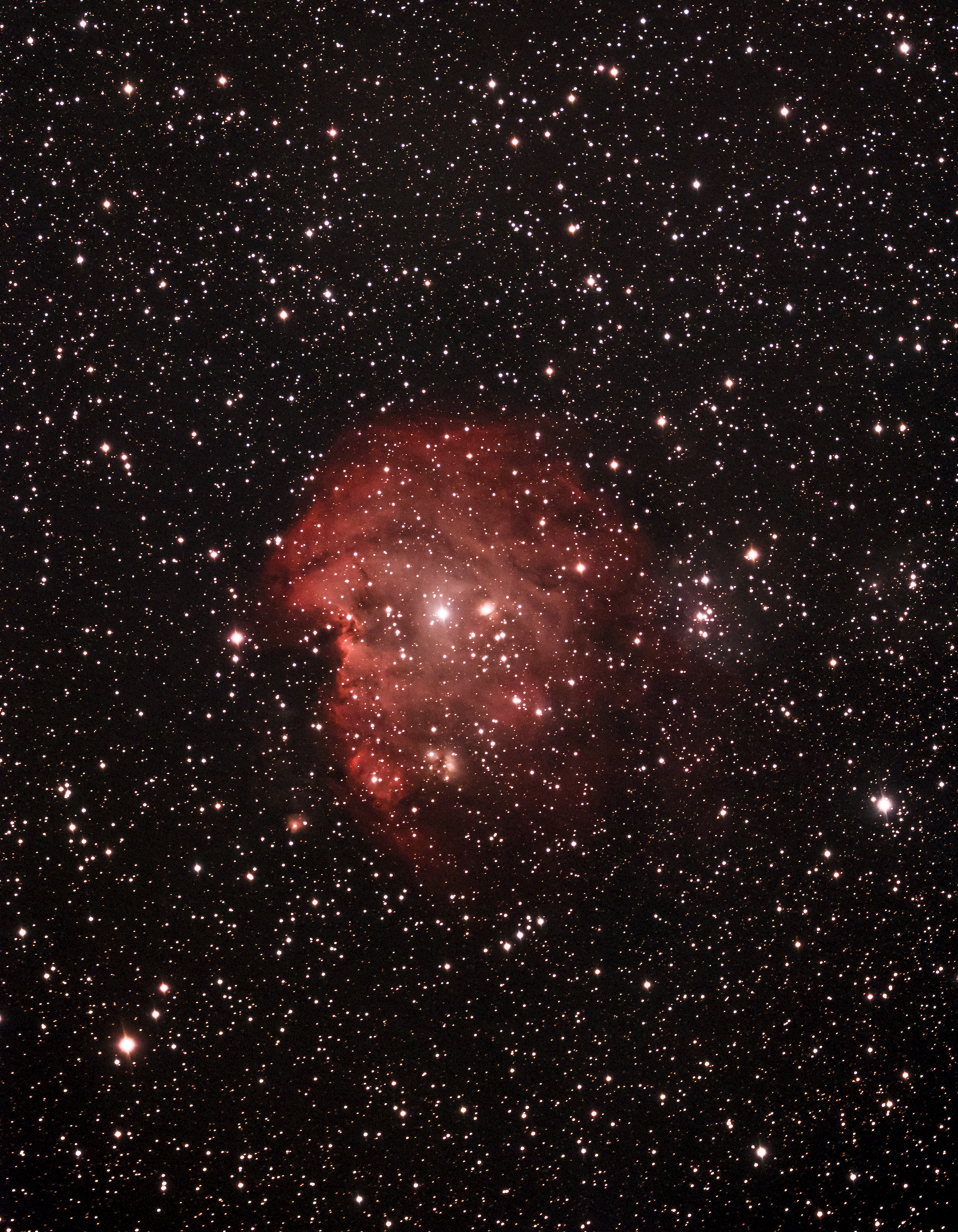

Observation data (J2000 epoch)
- Right ascension: 06^{h} 09^{m} 39.0^{s}
- Declination: +20° 29′ 12″
- Distance: 5,290 ly (1,621 pc)
- Apparent magnitude (V): 6.8
- Apparent dimensions (V): 18′

Physical characteristics
- Estimated age: 9.06±0.05 Myr
- Other designations: NGC 2175, Cr 84, OCL 476

Associations
- Constellation: Orion

NGC 2175 is a very young open cluster of stars in the equatorial constellation of Orion. It was discovered by Italian astronomer Giovanni Batista Hodierna before 1654 and independently discovered by German astronomer Karl Christian Bruhns on February 6, 1877. NGC 2175 is at a distance of about 5,290 light years away from Earth, and it is embedded in a diffuse nebula, NGC 2174.

The estimated age of this cluster is nine million years. The nebula surrounding it is Sharpless catalog Sh 2-252, and it is sometimes called the Monkey Head Nebula due to its appearance. In 1970, a smaller star cluster designated NGC 2175s was discovered in the vicinity.

== Designation ==
There is some equivocation in the use of the identifiers NGC 2174 and NGC 2175. These may apply to the entire nebula, to its brightest knot, or to the star cluster it includes. Burnham's Celestial Handbook lists the entire nebula as 2174/2175 and does not mention the star cluster. The NGC Project (working from the original descriptive notes) assigns NGC 2174 to the prominent knot at J2000 06^{h} 09^{m} 23.7^{s}, +20° 39′ 34″ and NGC 2175 to the entire nebula, and by extension to the star cluster. Simbad uses NGC 2174 for the nebula and NGC 2175 for the star cluster.

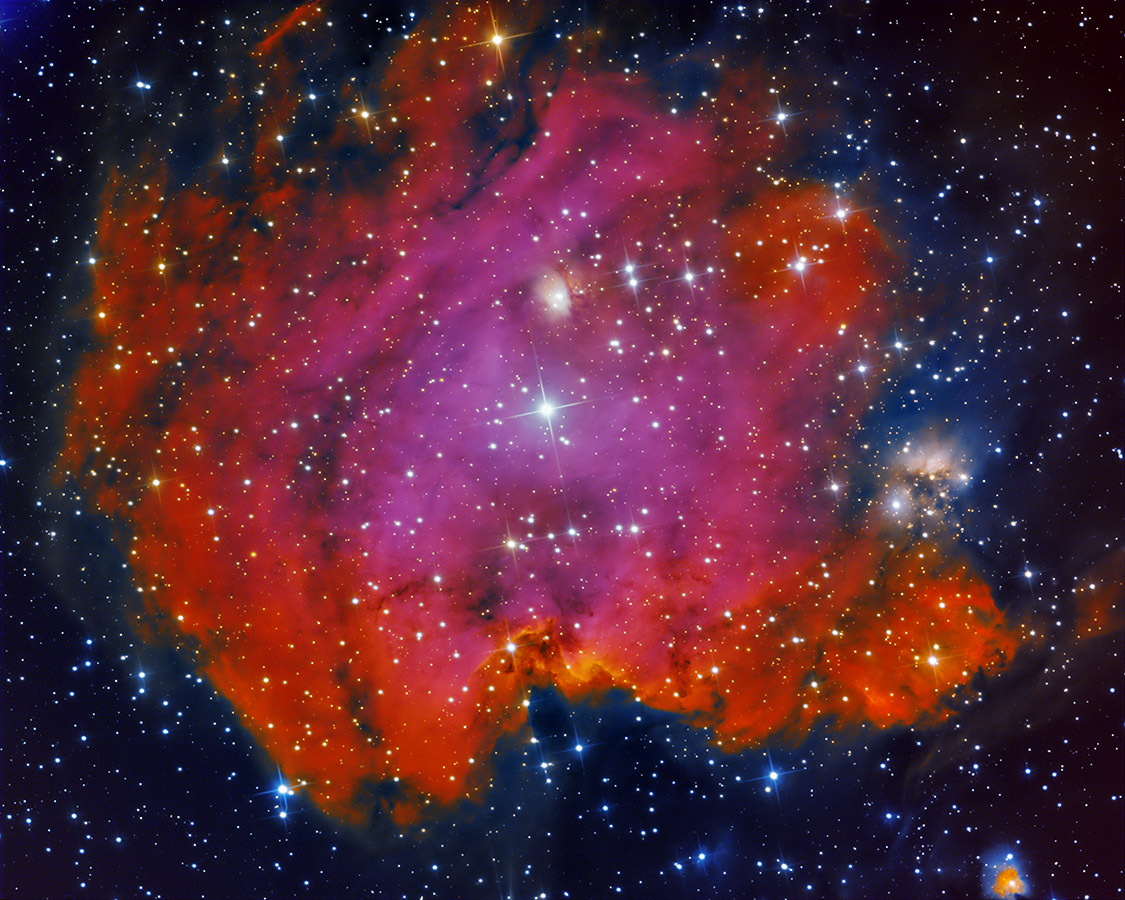
NGC 2175, LRGBHa image with 17" PlaneWave CDK by W4SM
