= NGC 752 =

Open cluster in the constellation Andromeda

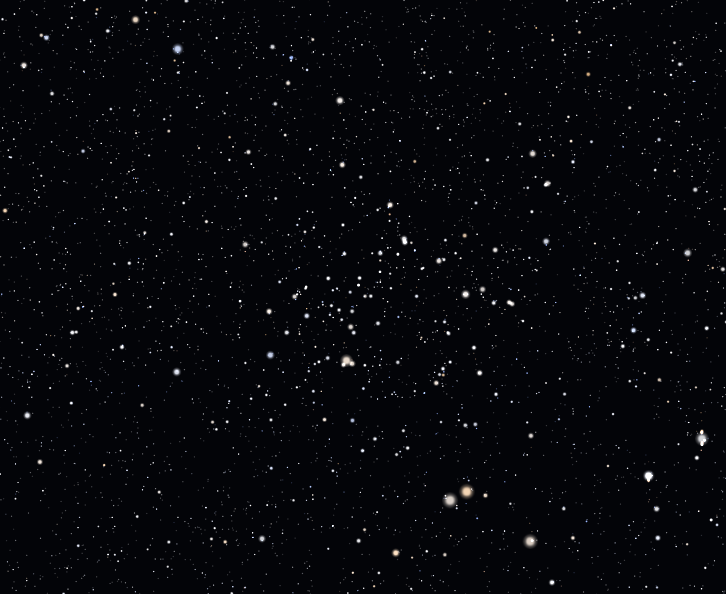
- NGC 752

Observation data (J2000 epoch)
- Right ascension: 01^{h} 57^{m} 41^{s}
- Declination: +37° 47.1′
- Distance: 1,470 ly (450 pc)
- Apparent magnitude (V): 5.7
- Apparent dimensions (V): 75′

Physical characteristics
- Other designations: Caldwell 28, Cr 23

Associations
- Constellation: Andromeda

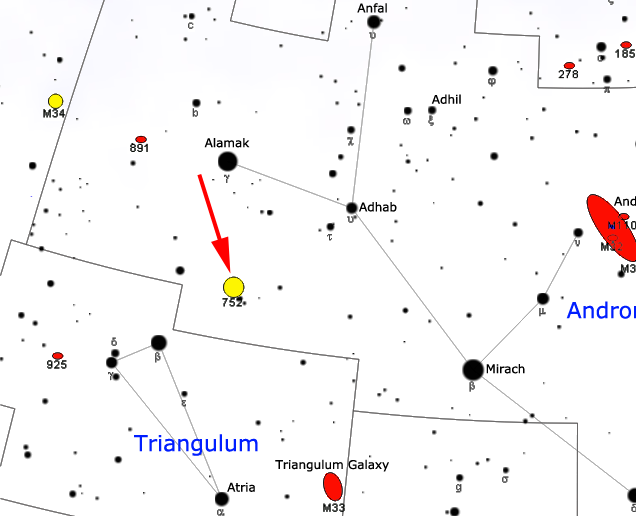
Map showing the location of NGC 752

NGC 752 (also known as Caldwell 28) is an open cluster of stars in the constellation Andromeda. The cluster was discovered by Caroline Herschel in 1783 and cataloged by her brother William Herschel in 1786, although an object that may have been NGC 752 was described by Giovanni Batista Hodierna before 1654.

The large cluster lies 1,400 light-years away from the Earth and is easily seen through binoculars, although it may approach naked eye visibility under good observing conditions. A telescope reveals about 60 stars no brighter than 9th magnitude within NGC 752.

== Components ==
Research by Gaysin & Hojaev (2022) lists 302 stars as members of NGC 752. Since the age of the cluster is 1.34±0.06 Gyr, they are mainly low mass stars on the main sequence or red giants, with a main sequence turnoff at about F0. A blue straggler star is also present, along with some spectroscopic binaries and variable stars. The detached eclipsing binary DS Andromedae is a member of this cluster.

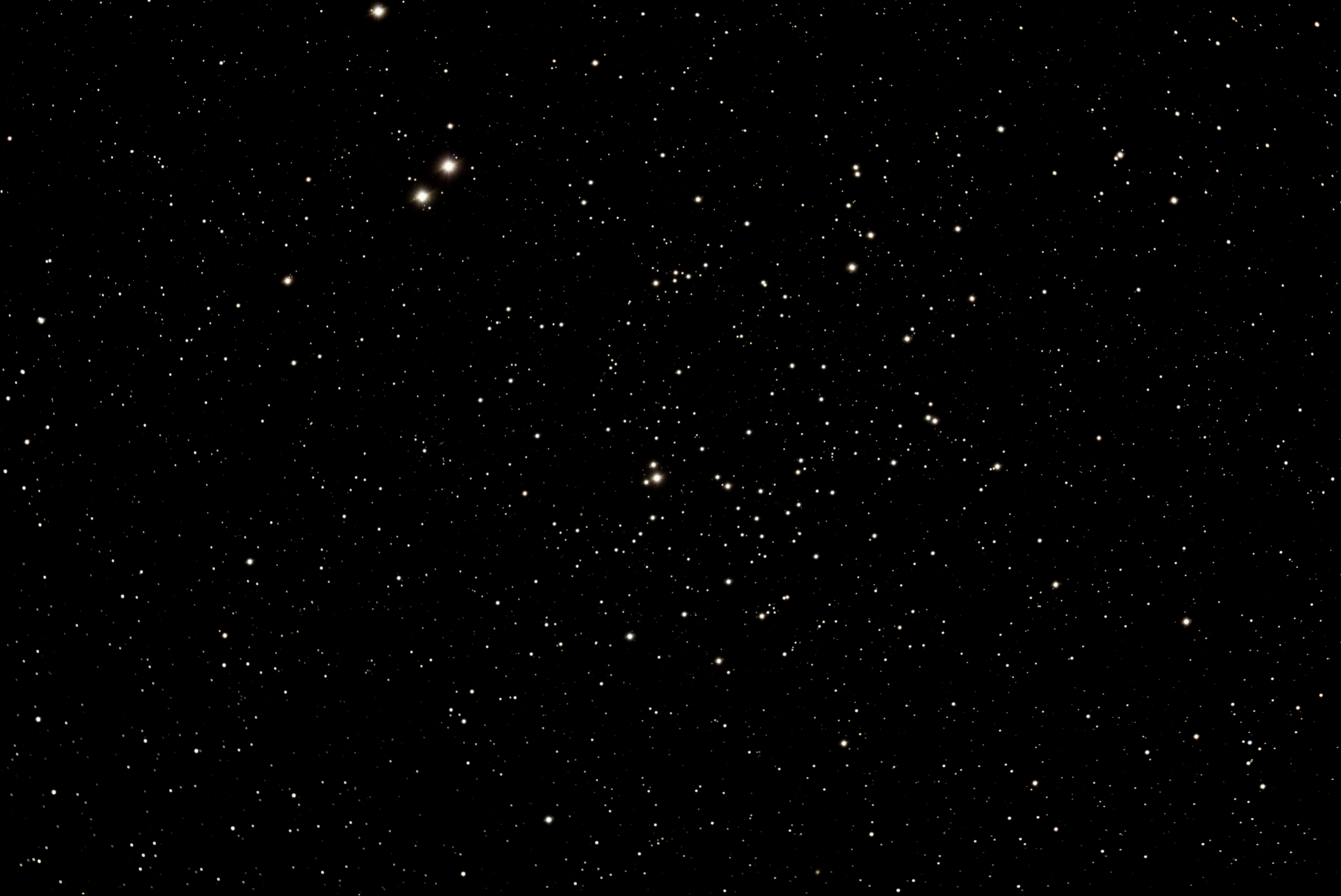
NGC 752

=== Notable stars ===
Name	Right ascension	Declination	Apparent magnitude (V)	Spectral type	Database references	Relevance
TYC 2816-327-1	01^{h} 56^{m} 08.9572^{s}	+37° 39' 52.7528"	10.41	F5.3V	Simbad	Gamma Doradus variable
DS Andromedae	01^{h} 57^{m} 46.0561^{s}	+38° 04' 28.43112"	10.44 - 10.93 (variable)	F3IV-V + G0V (double)	Simbad	Beta Lyrae variable
BD+37 416	01^{h} 56^{m} 10.3002^{s}	+37° 45' 00.0301"	10.00	F2III	Simbad	Spectroscopic binary
BD+37 416B	01^{h} 56^{m} 11.1020^{s}	+37° 45' 11.3889"	11.19	F0	Simbad	Candidate companion of BD+37 416
TYC 2816-1390-1	01^{h} 56^{m} 12.8772^{s}	+38° 01' 43.1869"	10.88	F3V	Simbad	Spectroscopic binary
TYC 2319-568-1	01^{h} 56^{m} 57.5899^{s}	+37° 23' 20.6538"	10.6	F2V	Simbad	Spectroscopic binary
2MASS J01571216+3756048	01^{h} 57^{m} 12.1584^{s}	+37° 56' 04.7909"	11.9	G5.0V	Simbad	Spectroscopic binary
BD+36 364	01^{h} 57^{m} 25.9968^{s}	+37° 43' 19.6966"	10.4	F2III	Simbad	Spectroscopic binary
QX Andromedae	01^{h} 57^{m} 57.7818^{s}	+37° 48' 22.4500"	11.28 - 11.50 (variable)	F5	Simbad	W Ursae Majoris variable
2MASS J01575883+3741269	01^{h} 57^{m} 58.8386^{s}	+37° 41' 26.9575"	12.31	F8	Simbad	Spectroscopic binary
TYC 2816-691-1	01^{h} 58^{m} 16.8604^{s}	+37° 38' 15.9955"	11.21	F5V	Simbad	Spectroscopic binary
V447 Andromedae	01^{h} 58^{m} 53.9322^{s}	+37° 34' 42.5263"	13.39	K3.0	Simbad	RS Canum Venaticorum variable
BD+36 348	01^{h} 55^{m} 27.6831^{s}	+37° 34' 04.6482"	10.14	F2V	Simbad	Spectroscopic binary
BD+37 410	01^{h} 55^{m} 29.2926^{s}	+37° 50' 26.3171"	9.94	F4III	Simbad	Eclipsing binary
BD+37 418	01^{h} 56^{m} 18.8954^{s}	+37° 58' 00.4602"	8.97	G9III	Simbad	Spectroscopic binary
HD 11812	01^{h} 56^{m} 49.7623^{s}	+38° 01' 21.6883"	9.13	F3V	Simbad	In the HD catalogue
HD 11811	01^{h} 56^{m} 50.4330^{s}	+38° 01' 58.1400"	8.91	G2V	Simbad	Spectroscopic binary
BD+37 431	01^{h} 57^{m} 36.2116^{s}	+37° 45' 10.1549"	9.85	F2III	Simbad	Spectroscopic binary
BD+36 367	01^{h} 57^{m} 37.3494^{s}	+37° 29' 27.6181"	9.75	A0III	Simbad	Blue straggler
BD+36 368	01^{h} 57^{m} 37.5965^{s}	+37° 39' 37.9032"	8.85	K1III	Simbad	Spectroscopic binary
BD+37 439	01^{h} 57^{m} 59.3462^{s}	+37° 54' 53.9679"	9.85	F2III	Simbad	Spectroscopic binary
BD+37 444	01^{h} 58^{m} 36.8870^{s}	+37° 45' 10.7241"	9.62	F2V	Simbad	Spectroscopic binary
TYC 2816-771-1	01^{h} 58^{m} 40.0620^{s}	+37° 38' 05.2030"	12.43	F2V	Simbad	Spectroscopic binary
2MASS J01591990+3723230	01^{h} 59^{m} 19.8967^{s}	+37° 23' 23.0364"	12.893	–	Simbad	Spectroscopic binary
