= Messier 41 =

Open cluster in the constellation Canis Major

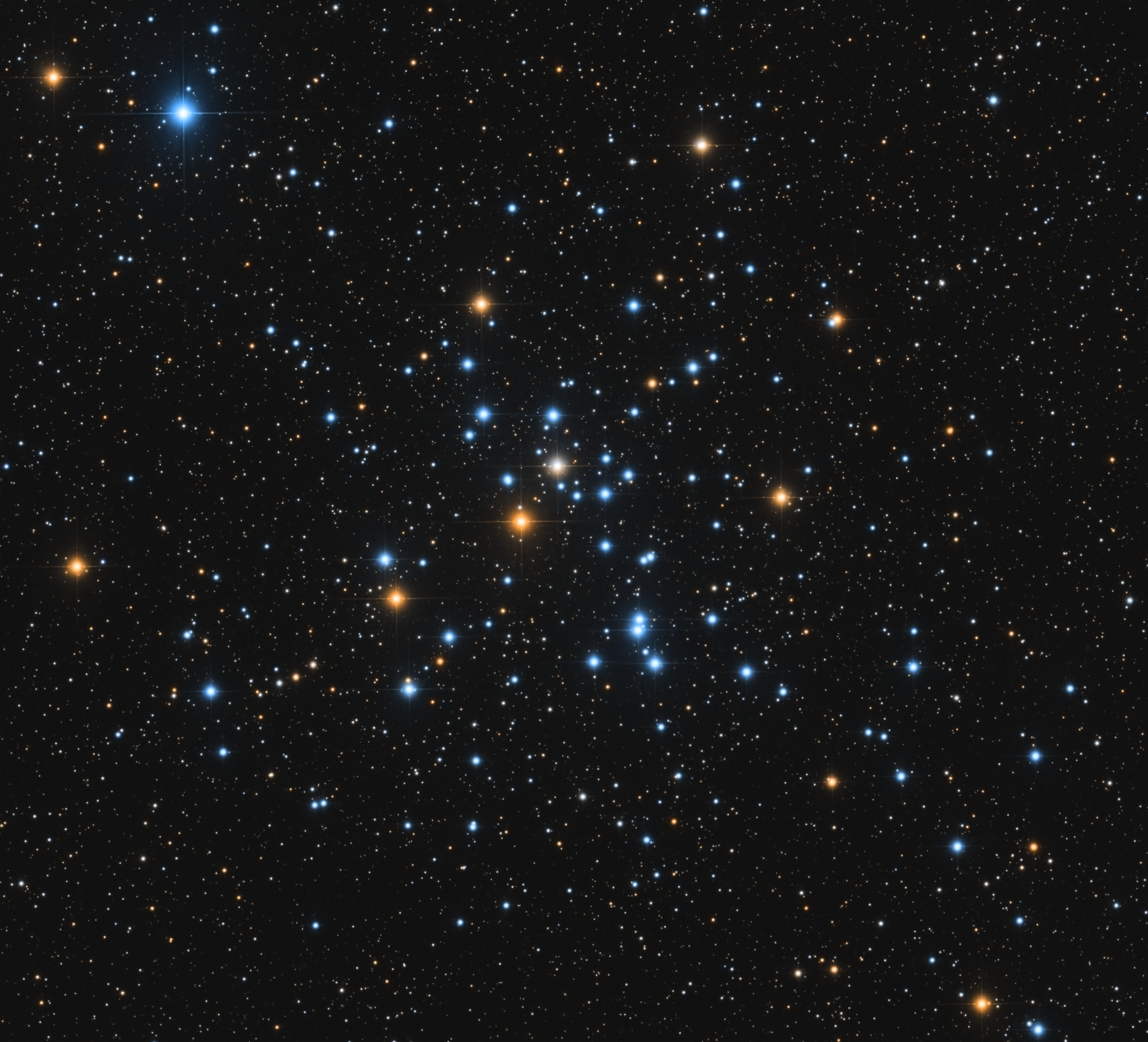
- Open cluster Messier 41 in Canis Major

Observation data (J2000 epoch)
- Right ascension: 06^{h} 46.0^{m}
- Declination: −20° 46′
- Distance: 2,360 ly (725 pc)
- Apparent magnitude (V): 4.5
- Apparent dimensions (V): 38 arcmin

Physical characteristics
- Radius: 12.5 ly
- Estimated age: 200 million yrs
- Other designations: M41, NGC 2287

Associations
- Constellation: Canis Major

Messier 41 (also known as M41 or NGC 2287) is an open cluster in the constellation Canis Major. Located approximately four degrees south of Sirius, it forms a roughly equilateral triangle with Sirius and Nu^{2} Canis Majoris, visible together in binoculars. The cluster spans an area comparable to the size of the full moon and contains about 100 stars, including several red giants and white dwarfs.

== Discovery and history ==
Discovered by Giovanni Batista Hodierna before 1654, M41 may have been observed by Aristotle as early as 325 BC. It is sometimes called the Little Beehive Cluster due to its resemblance to the Beehive Cluster (M44).

== Characteristics ==
The brightest star in M41 is a red giant of spectral type K3 with an apparent magnitude of 6.3 near the cluster's center. The cluster has a diameter of 25–26 light-years (7.7–8.0 pc) and is receding from Earth at 23.3 km/s. Estimates suggest an age of 190 million years, with a predicted lifespan of 500 million years before disintegration.

== Observation ==
Walter Scott Houston noted its appearance in small telescopes:

Many visual observers speak of seeing curved lines of stars in M41. Although they seem inconspicuous on photographs, the curves stand out strongly in my 10-inch [reflecting telescope], and the bright red star near the center of the cluster is prominent.

The prominent red-orange central star, HIP 32406, is a K2-type giant of magnitude 6.9, located ~1,500 light-years away.

== Gallery ==
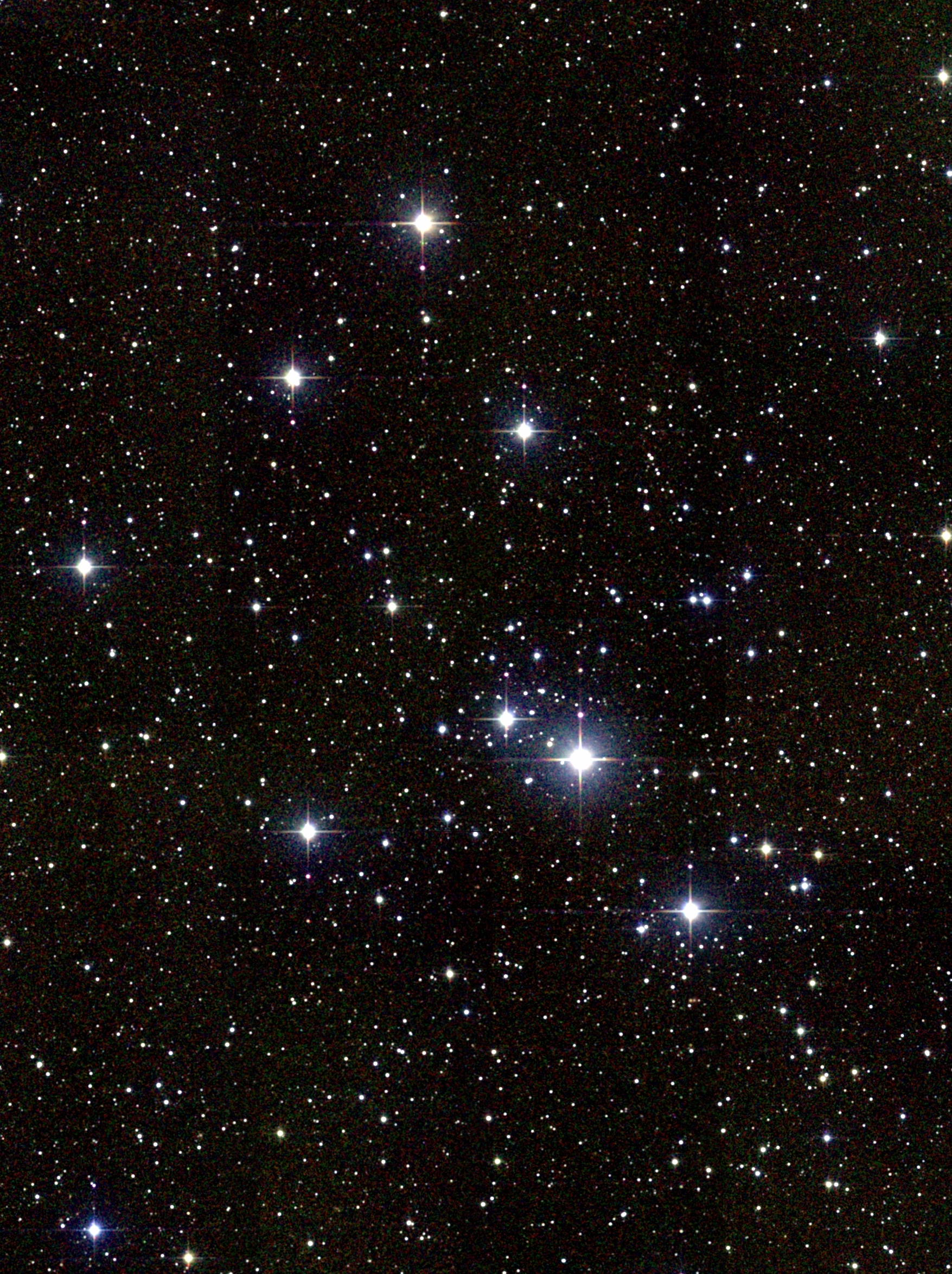
Center 2MASS/NASA

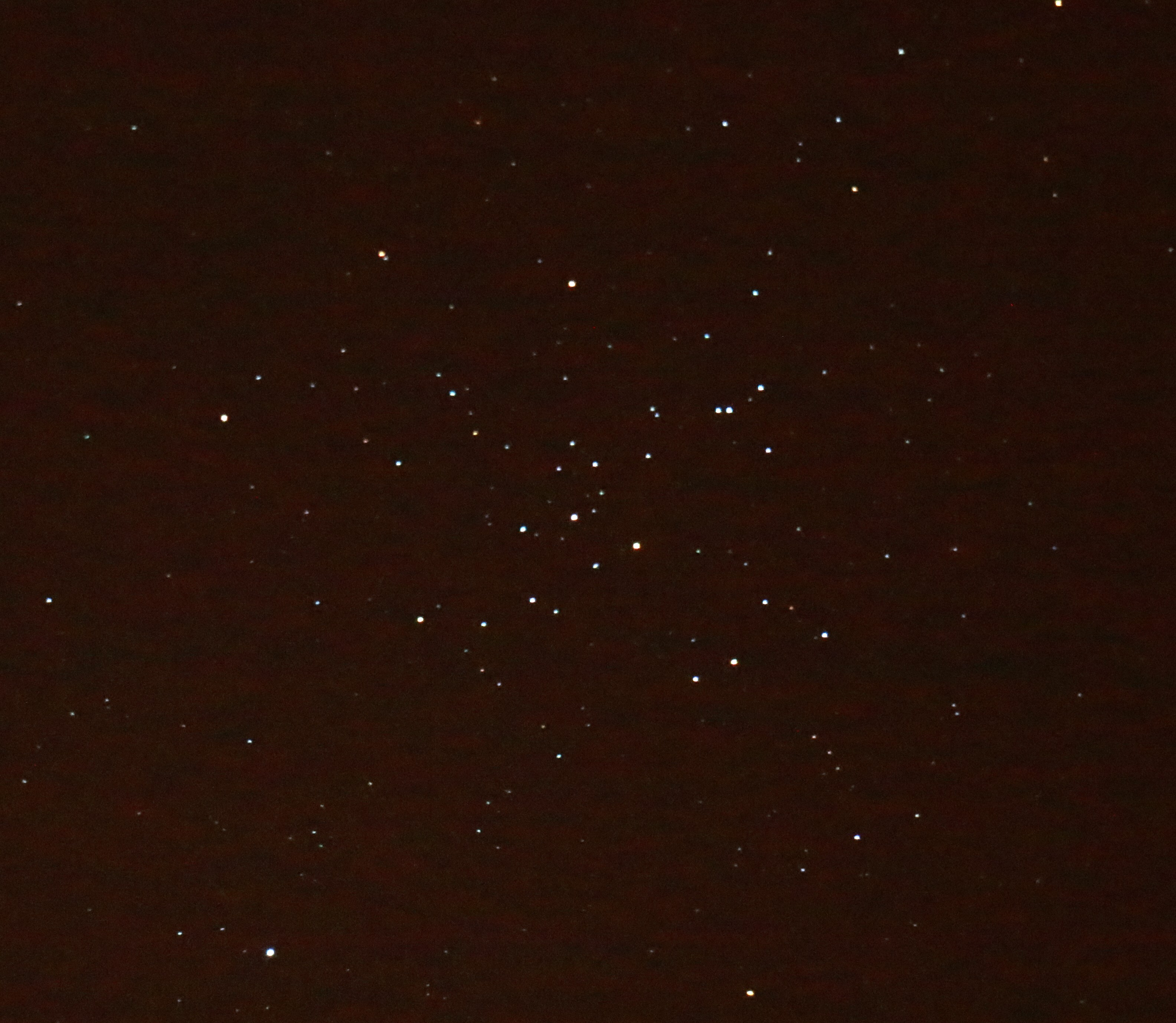
M41 in an 8" telescope

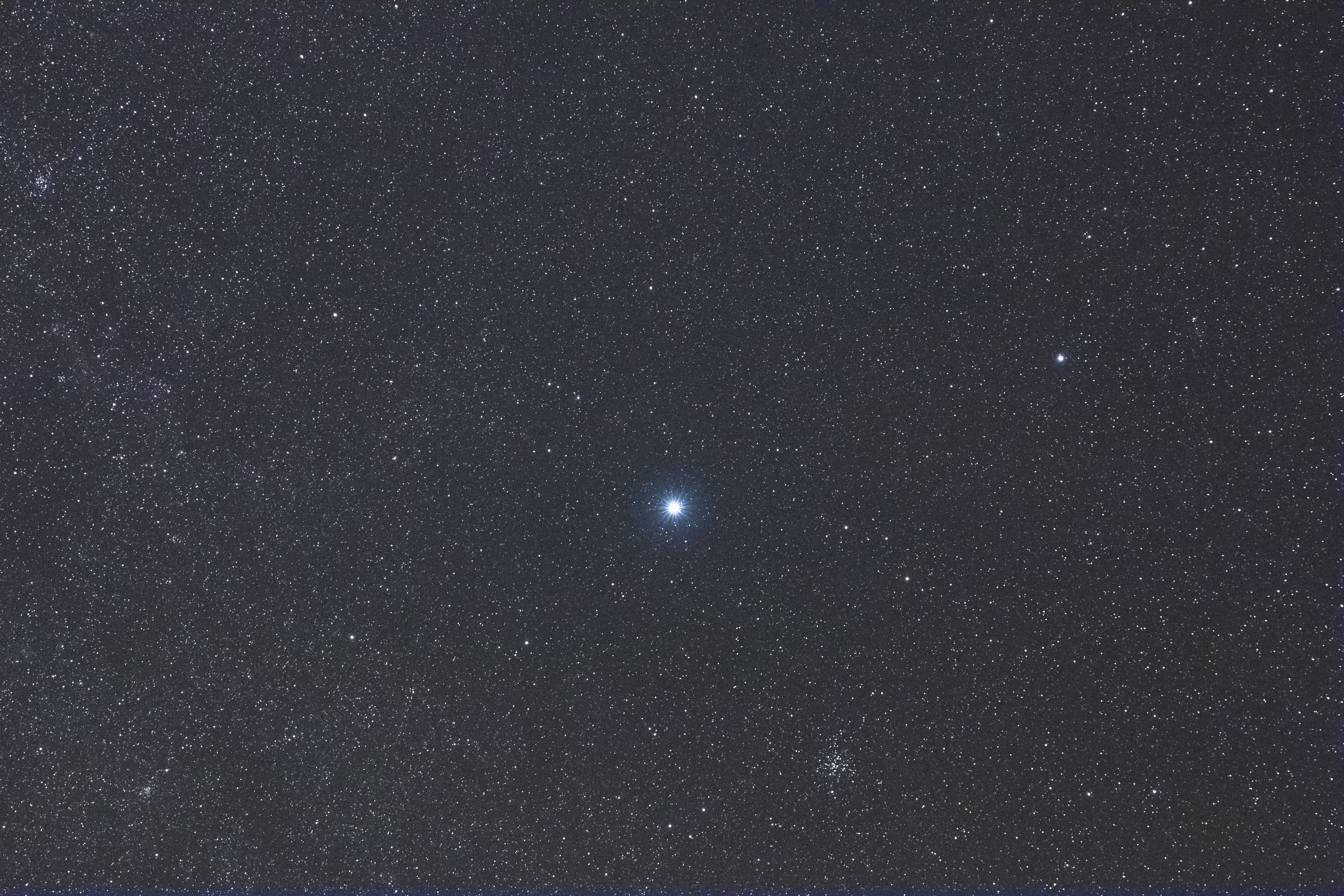
Sirius and M41 (lower right), M50 (upper left), and NGC 2360 (lower left)

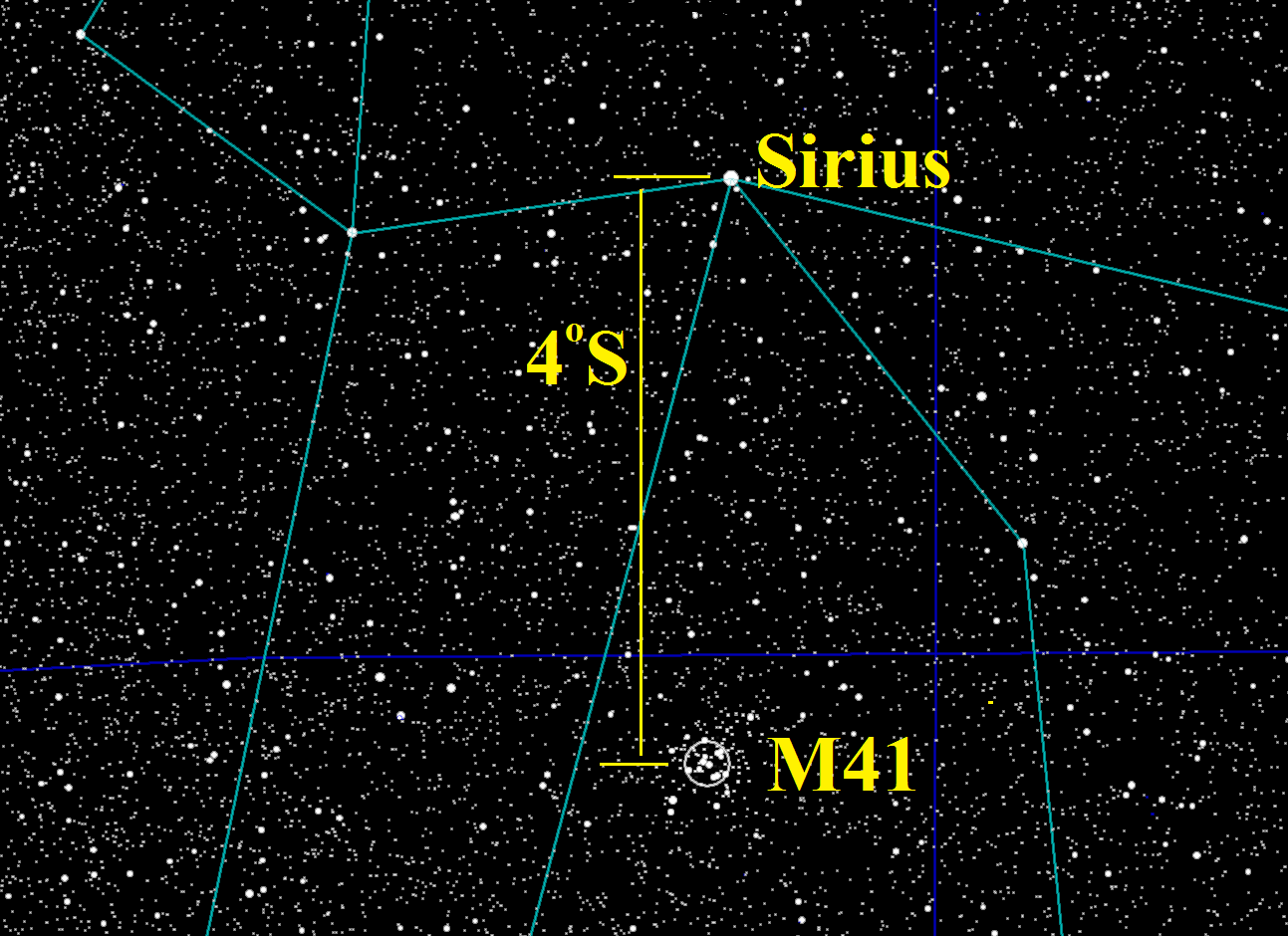
M41 finder chart

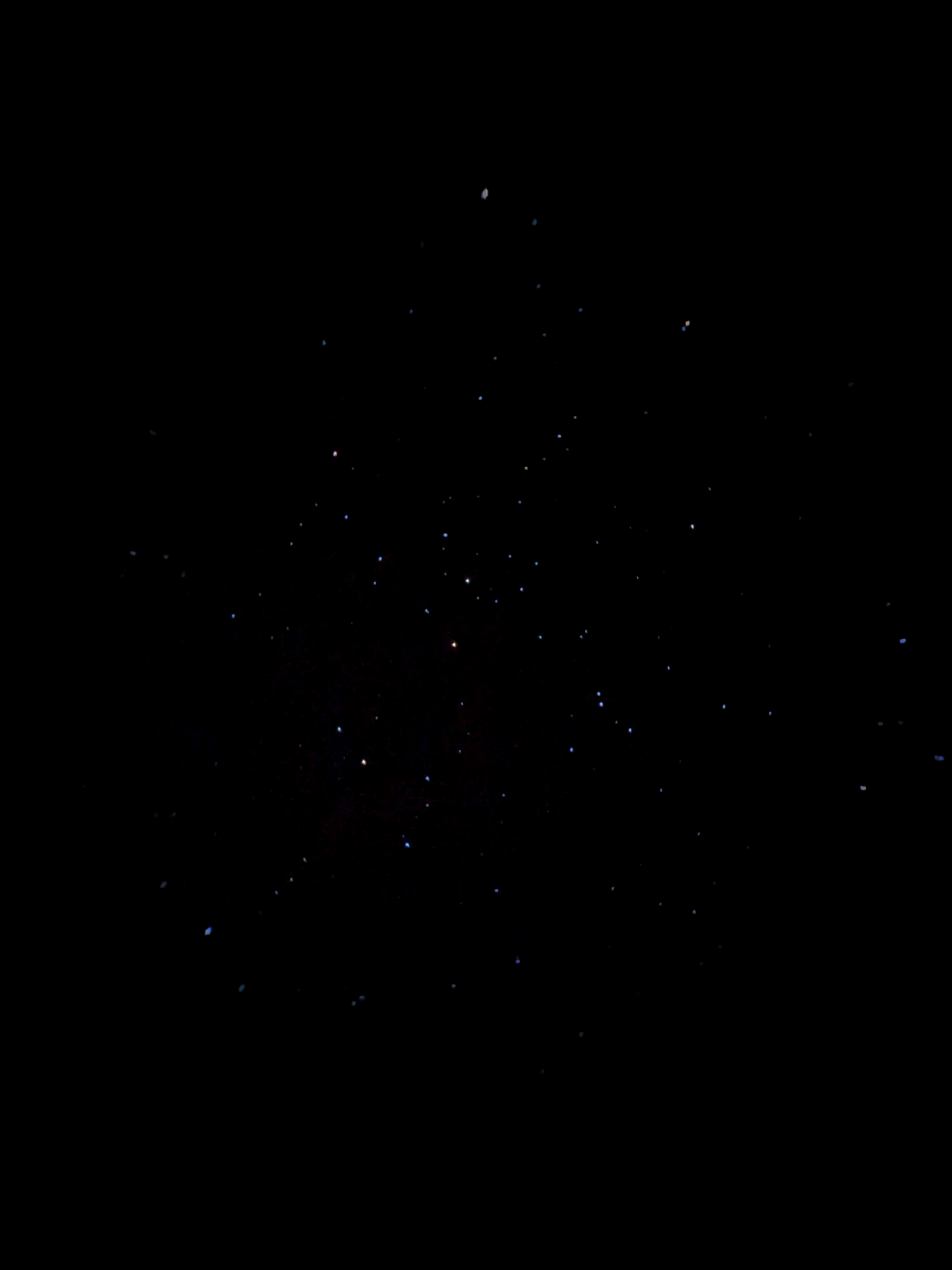
Open cluster M41 taken from a 12-inch Dobson telescope in Viña del Mar

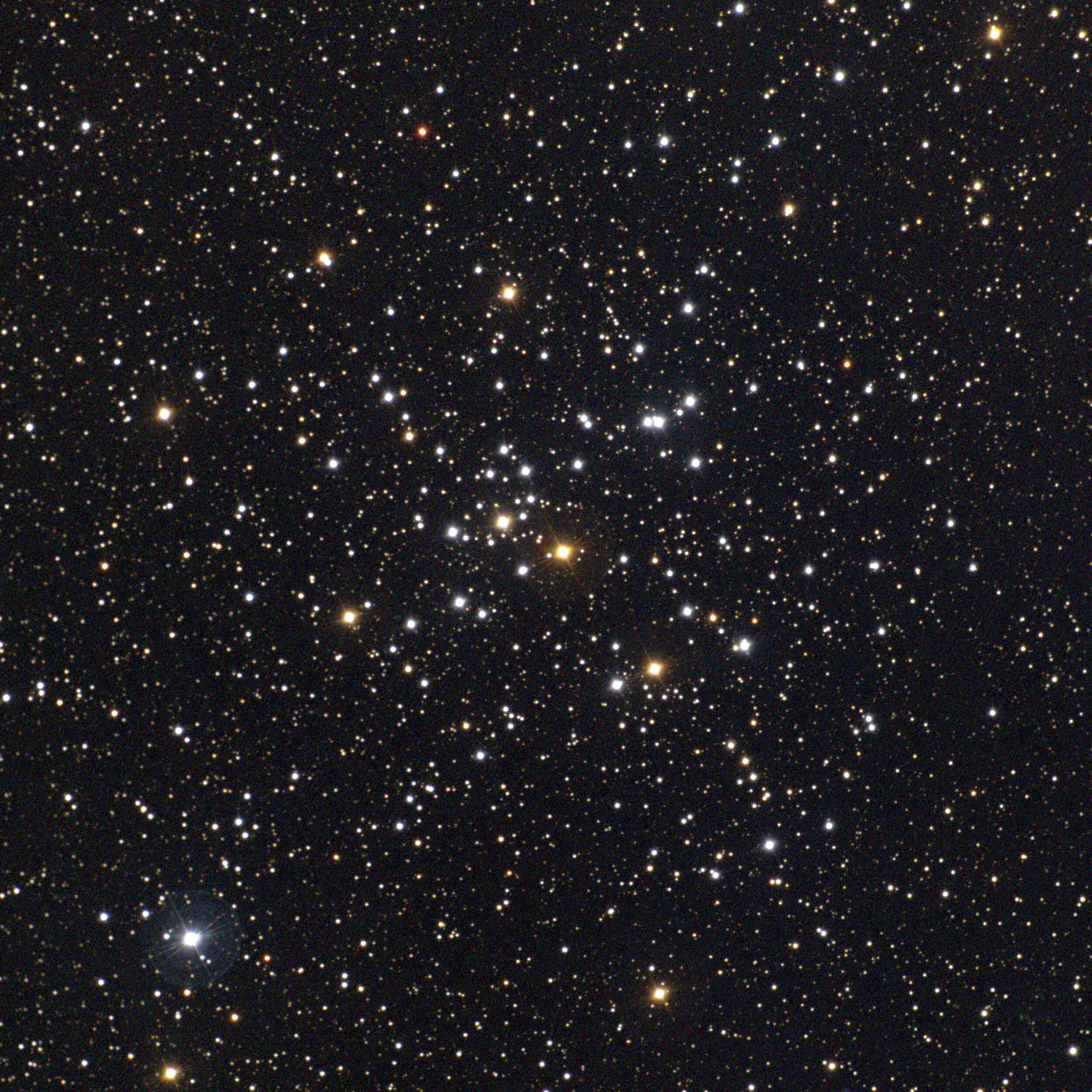
Open cluster Messier 41 in Canis Major

== See also ==
- List of Messier objects
- New General Catalogue
- Messier object
- List of open clusters
