= NGC 2360 =

Open cluster in the constellation Canis Major

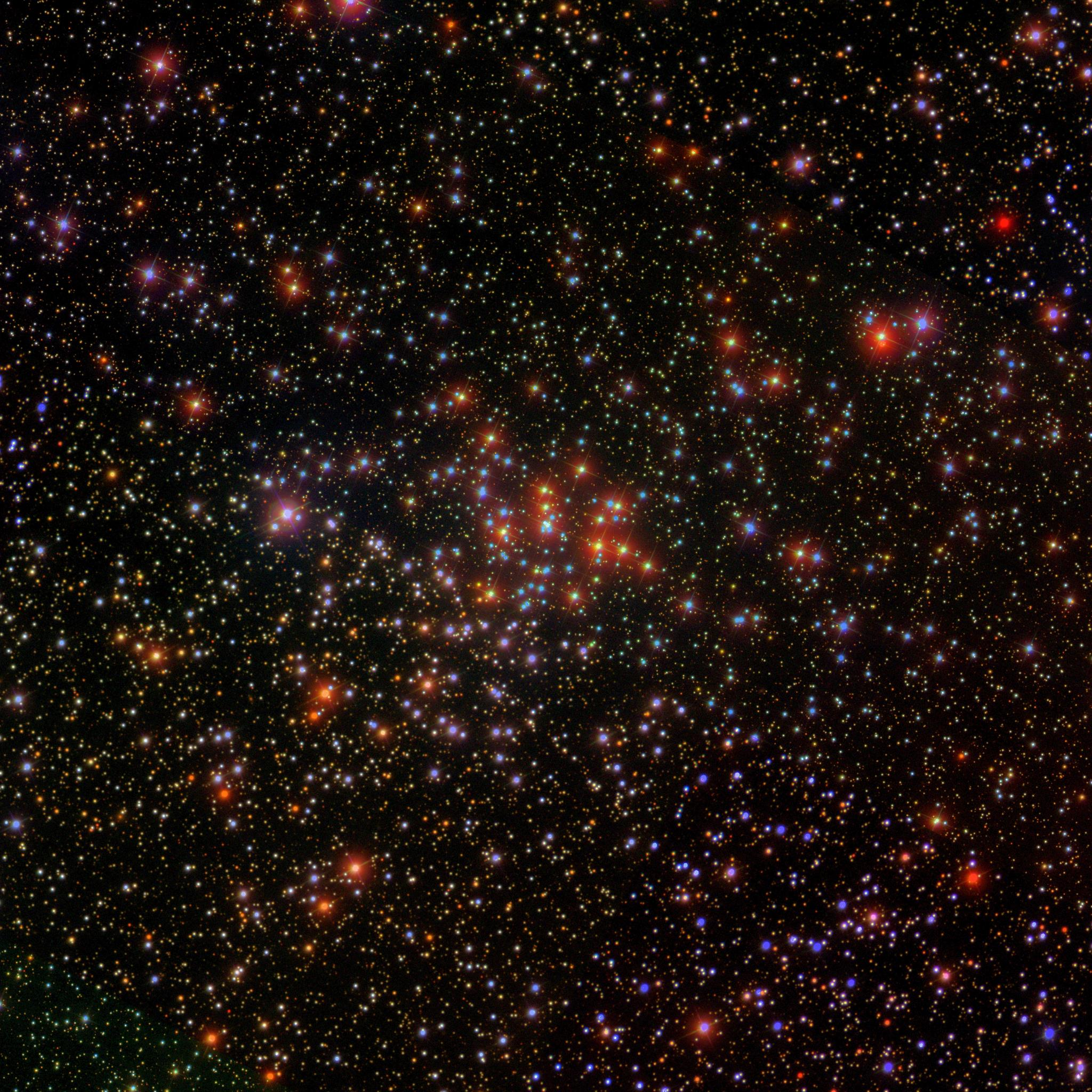
- SDSS

Observation data (J2000 epoch)
- Right ascension: 07^{h} 17^{m} 43^{s}
- Declination: −15° 38′ 29″
- Apparent magnitude (V): 7.2
- Apparent dimensions (V): 14′

Physical characteristics
- Other designations: Caroline's Cluster, Caldwell 58, Cr 134, Mel 64

Associations
- Constellation: Canis Major

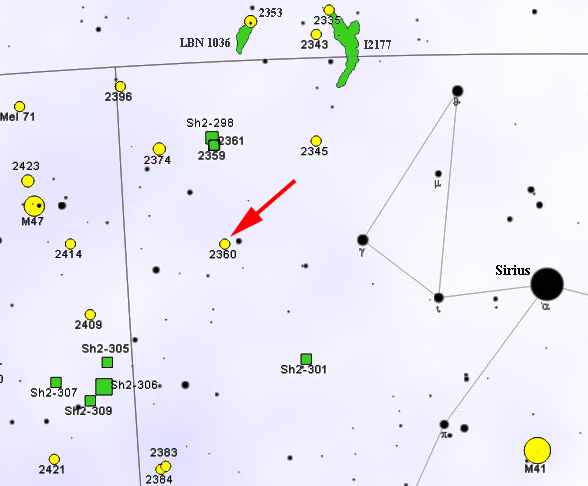
Map showing the location of NGC 2360

NGC 2360 is an open cluster of stars in the constellation of Canis Major. Alternatively, it is known as Caroline's Cluster or Caldwell 58. It was discovered on 26 February 1783 by Caroline Herschel, who described it as a "beautiful cluster of pretty compressed stars near 1/2 degree in diameter". Her notes were overlooked until her brother William included the cluster in his 1786 catalogue of 1000 clusters and nebulae and acknowledged her as the discoverer. The cluster lies 3.5 degrees east of Gamma Canis Majoris and less than one degree northwest of the eclipsing binary star R Canis Majoris; it has a combined apparent magnitude of 7.2. It is 13 arc minutes in diameter. By the western edge of the cluster is the unrelated star, 5.5-magnitude HD 56405.

American astronomer Olin J. Eggen surveyed the cluster in 1968, concluding that the brightest star in the field, magnitude-8.96 HD 56847, is likely to lie in the field and not a true member of the cluster. He also identified one or possibly two blue stragglers. These are unexpectedly hot and luminous stars that appear younger than surrounding stars, and have likely developed by sucking matter off companion stars. Four are now recognised to be in the cluster. By analysing the masses of the smallest stars that have evolved into red giants—namely, stars of 1.8 or 1.9 solar masses—Swiss astronomers Jean-Claude Mermilliod and Michel Mayor were able to date the age of the cluster at 2.2 billion years. The cluster has a diameter of around 15 light-years and is located 3700 light-years from Earth.

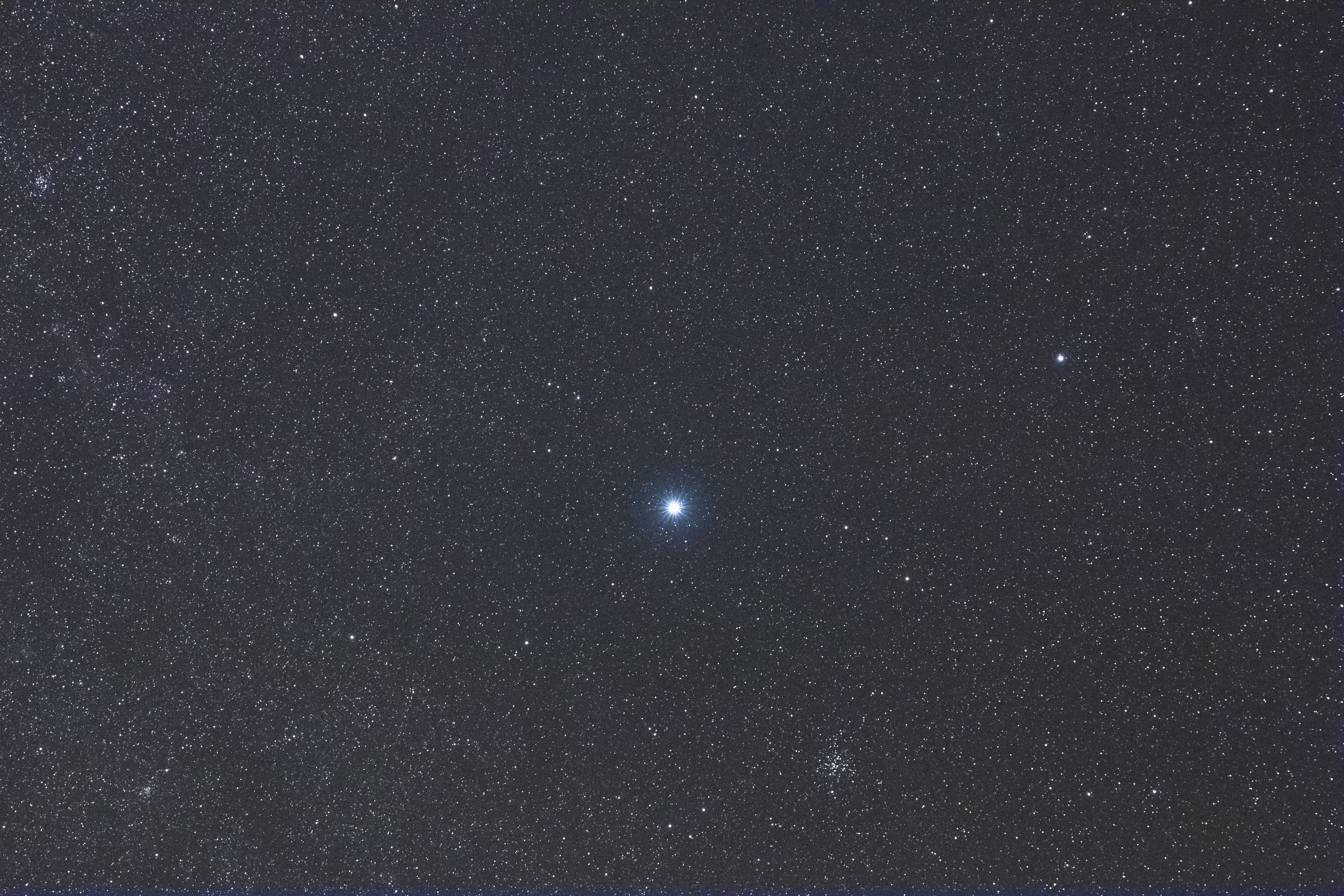
Sirius and M41 (lower right), M50 (upper left), and NGC 2360 (lower left)
