= Giovanni Battista Hodierna =

Italian astronomer

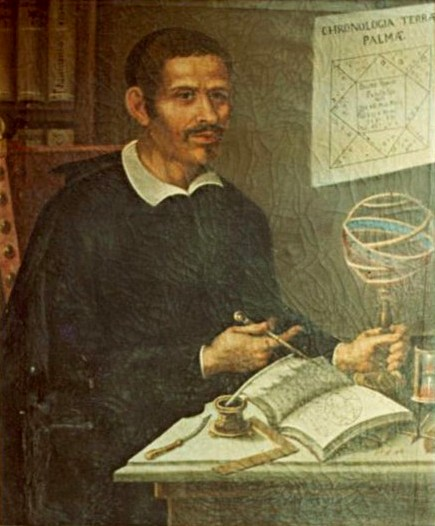
- Born: 13 April 1597; Ragusa, Kingdom of Sicily
- Died: 6 April 1660; Palma di Montechiaro, Kingdom of Sicily
- Occupations: Entomologist, astronomer, Catholic priest
- Notable work: De systemate orbis cometici, deque admirandis coeli characteribus
- Movement: Scientific Revolution

Signature
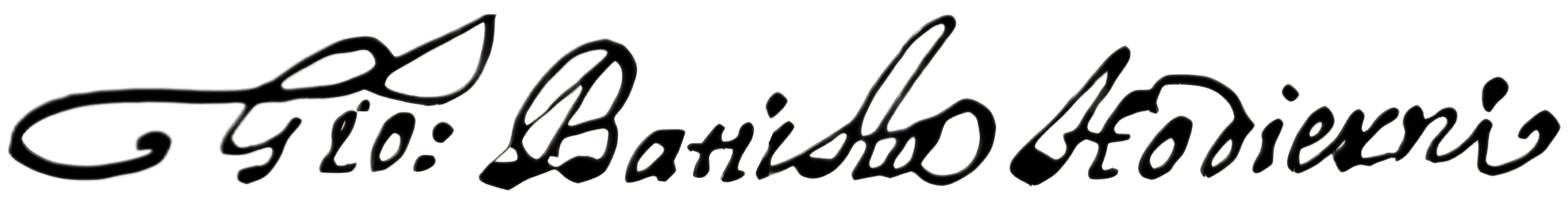

Giovanni Battista Hodierna, also spelled as Odierna (13 April 1597 – 6 April 1660) was an Italian astronomer at the court of Giulio Tomasi, Duke of Palma (Palma di Montechiaro). He compiled a catalogue of comets and other celestial objects containing some 40 entries, including at least 19 real and verifiable nebulous objects that might be confused with comets.

== Biography ==
Hodierna was born in Ragusa, Sicily and died in Palma di Montechiaro. While serving as a Roman Catholic priest in Ragusa, he also practised astronomy.

In 1654 he published a book entitled De systemate orbis cometici, deque admirandis coeli characteribus that contained a catalogue of celestial objects and a list of double stars. The work anticipated Messier's catalogue and the double star catalogues by Christian Mayer and William Herschel, but had little impact. Messier seems not to have known of it.

Hodierna was prolific in publication, and his interests spanned many disciplines. In addition to his astronomical observations, he utilized optic microscopes to study insects, publishing on the multifaceted eye of flies and that in bee colonies only the queen is oviparous.

== Works ==
- Archimede redivivo colla stadera del momento, dove non solamente si insegna il modo di scoprire le frodi nella falsificazione dell'oro e dell'argento; ma si notifica l'uso delli pesi e delle misure civili presso diverse nazioni del mondo e di questo regno di Sicilia, Decio Cirillo publisher, Palermo, 1644.
- Protei cælestis vertigines seu Saturni systema, Nicolo Bua, publisher, Panormita (1657).
- La stella nuova e peregrina comparsa l'anno 1600 sul petto del cigno, scoverta nuovamente, Ignazio di Lazzari, Rome (1659).
- De systemate orbis cometici; deque admirandis coeli characteribus, Nicolo Bua, publisher, Panormita (1654).

== See also ==
- List of Roman Catholic scientist-clerics
