= D Carinae =

The Bayer designations d Carinae and D Carinae are distinct.

- for d Carinae, see V343 Carinae
- for D Carinae, see HR 3159
