= Beta Canis Majoris =

Star in the constellation Canis Major

- Location of β Canis Majoris (circled)

Observation data Epoch J2000 Equinox ICRS
- Constellation: Canis Major
- Right ascension: 06^{h} 22^{m} 41.98535^{s}
- Declination: −17° 57′ 21.3073″
- Apparent magnitude (V): 1.985 (1.97 – 2.01)

Characteristics
- Spectral type: B1 II-III
- U−B color index: −0.99
- B−V color index: −0.235
- Variable type: β Cep

Astrometry
Radial velocity (R_{v})	+33.7 km/s
Proper motion (μ)	RA: −3.23 mas/yr Dec.: −0.78 mas/yr
Parallax (π)	5.6±0.3 mas
Distance	580 ± 30 ly (179 ± 10 pc)
Absolute magnitude (M_{V})	−3.93±0.04

Details
Mass	13.2±1.5 M_{☉}
Radius	10.5±0.5 R_{☉}
Luminosity	25,700+3,800 −3,300 L_{☉}
Surface gravity (log g)	3.52±0.02 cgs
Temperature	25,180±1,120 K
Metallicity [Fe/H]	0.04±0.10 dex
Rotation	13.6±1.2 days
Rotational velocity (v sin i)	31±5 km/s
Age	14.6±2.6 Myr

Other designations
- Mirzam, Murzim, Mirza, β Canis Majoris, 2 Canis Majoris, BD−17°1467, FK5 243, GC 8223, HD 44743, HIP 30324, HR 2294, SAO 151428, CCDM 06227-1757

Database references
SIMBAD	data

Beta Canis Majoris is a star in the southern constellation of Canis Major, the "Great Dog". Its name is a Bayer designation; it has the proper name Mirzam, pronounced /ˈmɜːrzəm/. Visible to the naked eye, this is a variable star that ranges in apparent visual magnitude from 1.97 to 2.01 over a period of six hours. Based on asteroseismic and interferometric observations, it is located at a distance of about 580 light-years (179 pc) from the Earth. The star is drifting further away from the Sun with a line of sight velocity of +34 km/s. In the modern constellation it lies at the position of the dog's front leg.

== Nomenclature ==
Beta Canis Majoris is the star's Bayer designation, which is Latinized from β Canis Majoris and abbreviated Beta CMa or β CMa. The traditional names Mirzam, Al-Murzim or Murzim, derive from the Arabic (مرزم) for "The Announcer" or "The Herald", and probably refer to its position, because it rises before Sirius in the night sky. In 2016, the International Astronomical Union organized a Working Group on Star Names (WGSN) to catalog and standardize proper names for stars. The WGSN's first bulletin of July 2016 included a table of the first two batches of names approved by the WGSN; which included Mirzam for this star.

In Chinese, 軍市 (Jūn Shì), meaning 'Market for Soldiers', refers to an asterism consisting of β Canis Majoris, Nu3 Canis Majoris, 15 Canis Majoris, Pi Canis Majoris, Omicron1 Canis Majoris and Xi1 Canis Majoris. Consequently, β Canis Majoris itself is known as 軍市一 (Jūn Shì yī, English: the First Star of Market for Soldiers). From this Chinese name arose the name Kuen She.

The Dunhuang Star Chart noted β Canis Majoris as Yeji "Pheasant Cock", though was located about 10 degrees too far north of its correct position.

Beta Canis Majoris was called Oupo by the people of the Tuamotus.

== Properties ==
Pulsation cycles
Frequency (day^{−1})	Amplitude (km s^{−1})
3.9793	2.7
3.9995	2.6
4.1832	0.7

Mirzam is a Beta Cephei variable that varies in apparent magnitude between +1.97 and +2.01 over a six-hour period, a change in brightness that is too small to be discerned with the naked eye. It exhibits this variation in luminosity because of periodic pulsations in its outer envelope, which follow a complex pattern with three different cycles, all about six hours in length. The two dominant pulsation frequencies have a combined beat period of roughly 50 days. The strongest pulsation mode is a radial first overtone, while the second is non-radial.

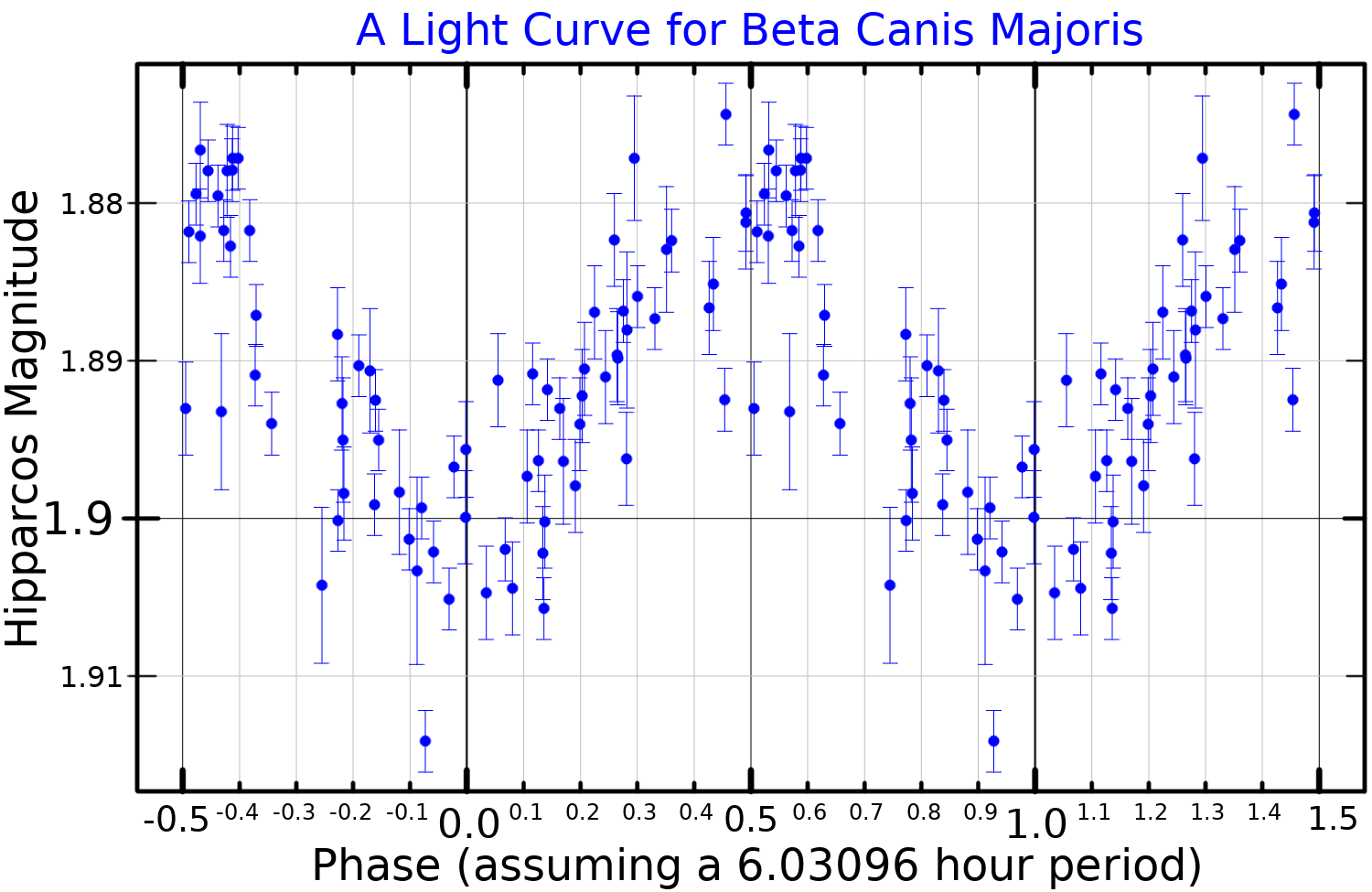
A light curve for Beta Canis Majoris, plotted from Hipparcos data

This star has a mass of about 13 times the mass of the Sun with 10.5 times the Sun's radius. The effective temperature of the star's outer envelope is about 24,700 K, which is much higher than the Sun's at 5,778 K. The energy emitted at the high temperature of the former is what gives this star a blue-white hue characteristic of a B-type star. The estimated age of Mirzam is 15 million years, which is long enough for a star of this mass to have evolved into a giant star. The stellar classification of B1 II-III indicates that the spectrum matches a star part way between a giant star and a bright giant. This star has a rotation period of 13.6 days and is inclined 57.6 ° as seen from Earth. Mirzam has sufficient mass to explode as a supernova.

Beta Canis Majoris is located near the far end of the Local Bubble, a cavity in the local interstellar medium through which the Sun is traveling. It is located within the Mirzam Tunnel, a region of less dense concentration between the stars and HII regions surrounding the Ori OB1 and Vel OB2 associations. Beta Canis Majoris was the brightest star in the night sky around four million years ago, peaking with an apparent magnitude of −3.65, or more than seven times as bright as Sirius today.

== In culture ==
Mirzam appears on the flag of Brazil, symbolising the state of Amapá.

Murzim (AK-95) was a United States Navy Crater class cargo ship named after one of the star's alternative traditional names.
