= USS Murzim =

US Navy Crater-class cargo ship in service 1943–1947

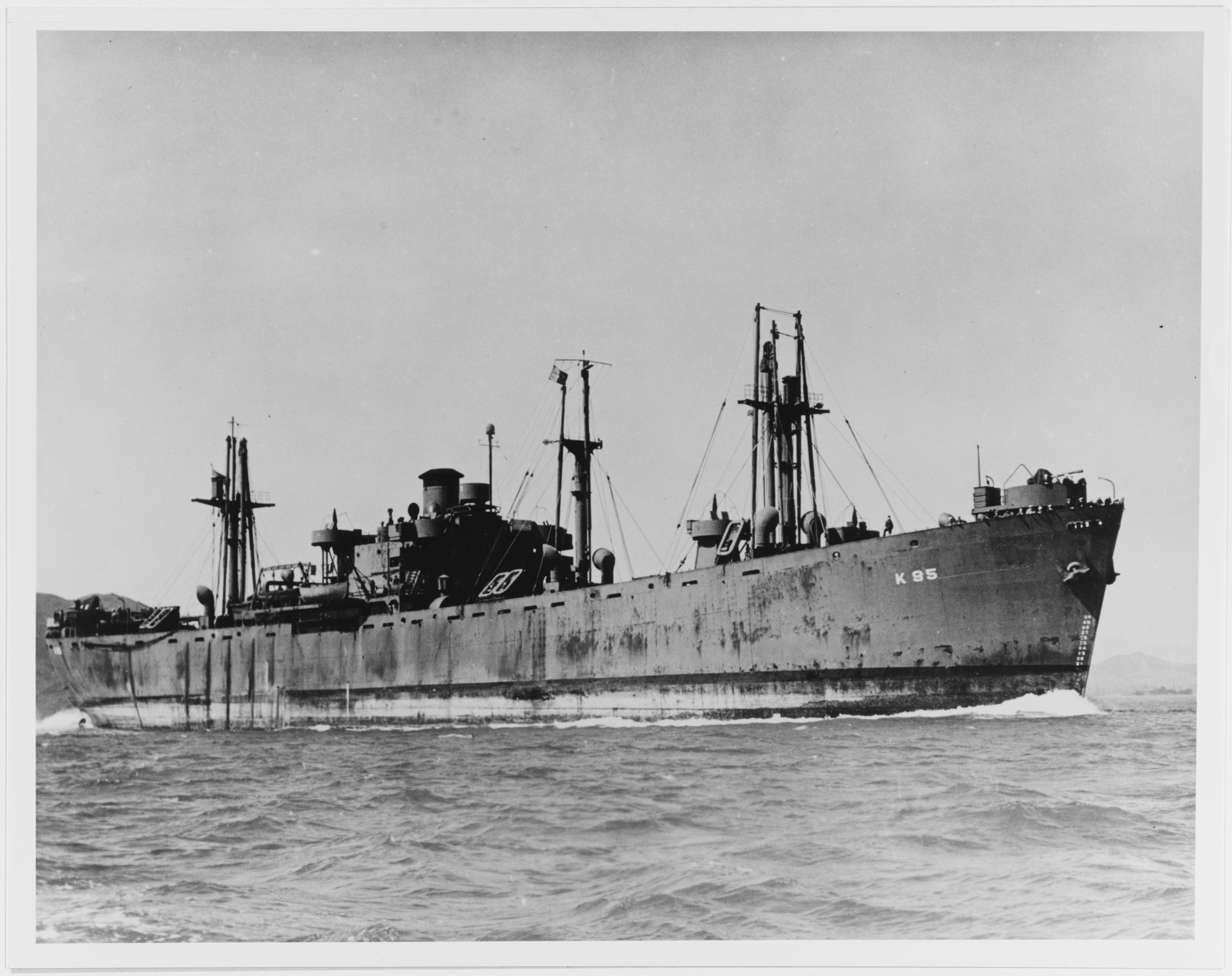
- USS Murzim (AK-95)

History

United States
- Name: Brigham Young; Murzim
- Namesake: Brigham Young; Murzim
- Ordered: as a Type EC2-S-C1 hull, MCE hull 633
- Builder: California Shipbuilding Corporation, Terminal Island, Los Angeles, California
- Cost: $1,254,162
- Yard number: 58
- Way number: 13
- Laid down: 10 July 1942
- Launched: 17 August 1942
- Sponsored by: Mrs. Albert E. Bowen
- Acquired: 8 April 1943
- Commissioned: 14 May 1943
- Decommissioned: 7 June 1946
- Renamed: Murzim, 17 March 1943
- Stricken: 23 June 1947
- Identification: Hull symbol: AK-94; Code letters: NJGS
- Honors and awards: 1 × battle star
- Fate: Returned to MARCOM, laid up in the National Defense Reserve Fleet, Suisun Bay, California, 5 August 1947; Sold for scrapping, 19 March 1973, withdrawn from fleet, 27 July 1973

General characteristics
- Class & type: Crater-class cargo ship
- Type: Type EC2-S-C1
- Displacement: 4,023 long tons (4,088 t) (standard); 14,550 long tons (14,780 t) (full load)
- Length: 441 ft 6 in (134.57 m)
- Beam: 56 ft 11 in (17.35 m)
- Draft: 28 ft 4 in (8.64 m)
- Installed power: 2 × Oil fired 450 °F (232 °C) boilers, operating at 220 psi (1,500 kPa) , (manufactured by Vogt); 2,500 shp (1,900 kW)
- Propulsion: 1 × Vertical triple-expansion reciprocating steam engine, (manufactured by Vogt); 1 × screw propeller
- Speed: 12.5 kn (23.2 km/h; 14.4 mph)
- Capacity: 7,800 t (7,700 long tons) DWT; 444,206 cu ft (12,578.5 m^{3}) (non-refrigerated)
- Complement: 206
- Armament: 1 × 5 in (127 mm)/38 caliber dual-purpose (DP) gun; 1 × 3 in (76 mm)/50 caliber DP gun; 2 × 40 mm (1.57 in) Bofors anti-aircraft (AA) gun mounts; 6 × 20 mm (0.79 in) Oerlikon cannon AA gun mounts

USS Murzim (AK-95) was a Crater-class cargo ship commissioned by the US Navy for service in World War II. She was named after Murzim, the star in constellation Canis Major. Murzim was manned by United States Coast Guard personnel and was responsible for delivering troops, goods and equipment to locations in the Asiatic-Pacific Theater.

In light of the Mount Hood tragedy, which involved the complete explosion of another ammunition ship, USS Mount Hood, it became clear that those on Murzim and other ammo ships were running the risk of nearly instantaneous death by catastrophic explosion at every moment of their stint in the Pacific Theater. Nevertheless, the crew worked even under the threat of air attack warnings, transferring their cargo to other fighting ships.

== Construction ==
Murzim was laid down 10 July 1942, under a United States Maritime Commission (MARCOM) contract, MC hull 633, as Liberty ship SS Brigham Young by California Shipbuilding Corporation, Terminal Island, Los Angeles, California; and launched 17 August 1942; sponsored by Mrs. Albert E. Bowen; renamed Murzim 17 March 1943; acquired by the Navy under bareboat charter from the MARCOM on 8 April 1943; converted for use as a naval cargo ship by the Los Angeles Shipbuilding & Drydock Company, Los Angeles, California; and commissioned 14 May 1943.

== Service history ==
For almost two months Murzim operated along the west coast of the United States under the 11th Naval District; thence, after loading general cargo, she departed from San Francisco on 8 July 1943, and arrived at New Caledonia on 5 August. She then began cargo shuttle runs among American bases in the South Pacific and during the next year, she delivered supplies from ports in Australia, New Zealand, and New Caledonia to the New Hebrides, the Fiji Islands, and the Solomon Islands. She carried out several voyages between Nouméa and Guadalcanal, and in the spring of 1944 she extended her runs northward along the Solomon chain to Bougainville, New Georgia, Green Island, and the Russells. In mid-June she sailed from the Solomons via New Guinea to the Admiralties where she discharged cargo at Manus. After steaming to Australia for a cargo of ammunition, she returned to New Guinea 24 August.

For almost two months, Murzim supplied antiaircraft ammunition to ships at Hollandia preparing for the invasion of the Philippines. After filling her holds with ammunition from Brisbane and Sydney Australia, she sailed without escort for the Philippines on 24 October. Arriving in Leyte Gulf on 29 October, she began duty as an ammo station ship. During the next three months she supplied ships from cruisers to LSTs with a variety of ammunition which ranged from 6 in (152 mm) to 20 mm (0.79 in). Despite numerous air alerts, her crew carried out the dangerous business of transferring ammunition to ships alongside. During an enemy air attack on 27 November, her 20 mm guns splashed a Japanese plane attacking the cargo ship from starboard.

Between 27 January and 4 February 1945, Murzim steamed in convoy to Manus where she replenished her holds with ammunition. Thence, after joining a convoy at Hollandia, she returned to Leyte on 22 March, and resumed ammo station duty in Leyte Gulf. During the closing weeks of the war against Japan, she delivered cargo to Manus and cruised to the Philippines with additional supplies of ammunition.

== End-of-war decommission ==
Following the Japanese surrender, Murzim was authorized for use in atomic tests in the Marshalls, and was ordered to transfer to joint Task Force 1, 25 February 1946. However, she was assigned to the 14th Naval District for inactivation 11 March, and she decommissioned at Pearl Harbor 7 June. She remained at Pearl Harbor until March 1947, when she was towed to San Francisco. Her name was struck from the Navy Directory 23 June. Murzim was transferred to MARCOM 5 August 1947, and entered the National Defense Reserve Fleet, Suisun Bay.

On 19 March 1973, she was sold to Nicolai Joffe Corporation, for $168,113, to be scrapped. She was withdrawn from the fleet 27 July 1973.

== Awards ==
Murzim received one battle star for World War II service.

== Bibliography ==
- "Murzim". Dictionary of American Naval Fighting Ships. Naval History and Heritage Command. 12 August 2015. This article incorporates text from this source, which is in the public domain.
- "California Shipbuilding, Los Angeles CA". ShipbuildingHistory.com. 13 October 2010.
- "USS MURZIM (AK-95)". NavSource. 6 September 2013.
- "MURZIM (AK-95)". United States Department of Transportation. Archived from the original on 12 December 2019.
- "BRIGHAM YOUNG". United States Department of Transportation. Archived from the original on 12 December 2019.
- "SS Brigham Young".
