= FN Canis Majoris =

Star in Canis Major constellation

- Image of FN Canis Majoris

Observation data Epoch J2000.0 Equinox ICRS
- Constellation: Canis Major
- Right ascension: 07^{h} 06^{m} 40.76672^{s}
- Declination: −11° 17′ 38.4396″
- Apparent magnitude (V): 5.41 (5.69 + 7.04)

Characteristics
- Spectral type: B0 III/IV or B2 Ia/ab
- B−V color index: 0.033±0.004

Astrometry
Radial velocity (R_{v})	+31.0±4.2 km/s
Proper motion (μ)	RA: −3.14±0.72 mas/yr Dec.: +3.32±0.55 mas/yr
Parallax (π)	1.07±0.61 mas
Distance	approx. 3,000 ly (approx. 900 pc)

Details
Mass	19.23±1.85, 24.0±0.1, 35.5±4.6 M_{☉}
Luminosity (bolometric)	122,079, 690,000 L_{☉}
Surface gravity (log g)	3.59±0.11 cgs
Temperature	26,850, 33,600±1,840 K
Rotational velocity (v sin i)	100±9 km/s
Age	6.0±0.1 Myr

Other designations
- FN CMa, BD−11°1790, GC 9389, HD 53974, HIP 34301, HR 2678, SAO 152394, WDS J07067-1118

Database references
SIMBAD	data

FN Canis Majoris is a binary star system in the southern constellation Canis Major, near the northern constellation border with Monoceros. It is dimly visible to the naked eye with a combined apparent visual magnitude of 5.41. The system is located at a distance of approximately 3,000 light years from the Sun based on parallax, and is drifting further away with a radial velocity of +31 km/s. It is a runaway star associated with the Sh 2-296 nebula in the CMa OB1 association, and has a conspicuous bow-shock feature.

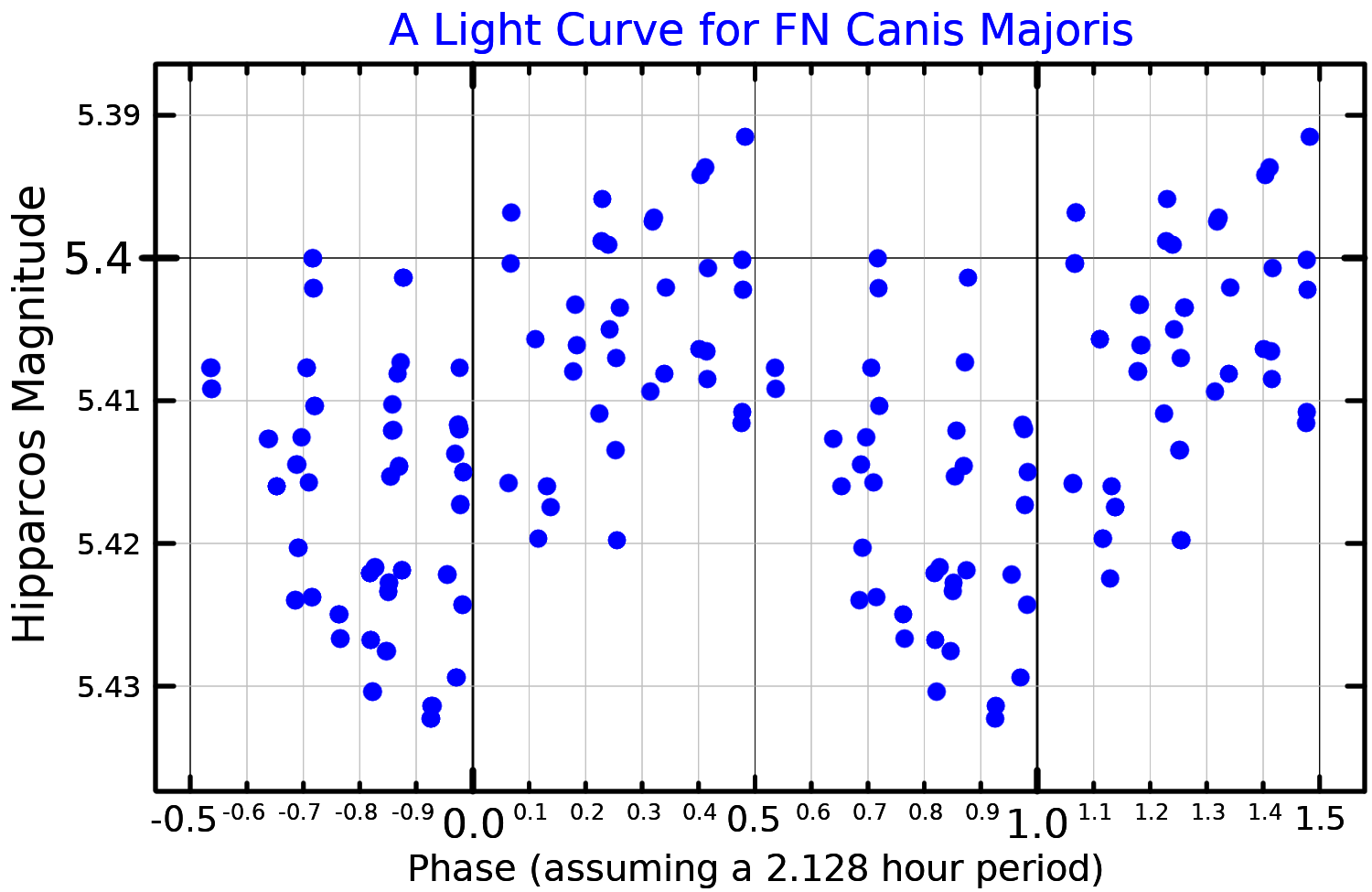
A light curve for FN Canis Majoris from Hipparcos data. Adapted from Rivinius et al. (2011)

The brighter component is a visual magnitude 5.69 B-type star that has been assigned various stellar classification from B0 III/IV to B2 Ia/ab, suggesting it is an evolved state. In 1967, Graham Hill announced his discovery that the star, then known as HD 53974, is a variable star. It was given its variable star designation, FN Canis Majoris, in 1970. In the past it was classified as a Beta Cephei type variable star with an apparent magnitude that was measured varying between +5.38 and +5.42 over a period of 36.7 hours, but is no longer considered to be one. This is a massive star with estimates ranging from 19 to 36 times the mass of the Sun, and luminosity estimates of 122,079 to 690,000 times the Sun's luminosity. The magnitude 7.04 companion is located at an angular separation of 0.60″ from the primary at a position angle of 111°, as of 2003.
