= 53 Piscium =

B-type subgiant star in the constellation Pisces

Observation data Epoch J2000.0 Equinox J2000.0 (ICRS)
- Constellation: Pisces
- Right ascension: 00^{h} 36^{m} 47.31100^{s}
- Declination: 15° 13′ 54.1903″
- Apparent magnitude (V): 5.87–5.88

Characteristics
- Evolutionary stage: main sequence
- Spectral type: B2.5V
- U−B color index: −0.67
- B−V color index: −0.15
- Variable type: β Cep

Astrometry
Radial velocity (R_{v})	−8.0±0.9 km/s
Proper motion (μ)	RA: +3.918 mas/yr Dec.: −9.890 mas/yr
Parallax (π)	3.5167±0.0782 mas
Distance	930 ± 20 ly (284 ± 6 pc)

Details
Mass	5.4±0.9 M_{☉}
Radius	3.3±1.0 R_{☉}
Luminosity	794 L_{☉}
Surface gravity (log g)	4.16±0.20 cgs
Temperature	17,300 K
Rotational velocity (v sin i)	33±17 km/s

Other designations
- AG Piscium, HD 3379, HIP 2903, HR 155, SAO 91995, BD+14°76

Database references
SIMBAD	data

53 Piscium, abbreviated as 53 Psc, is a star in the zodiac constellation of Pisces. With an apparent magnitude of about 5.9, it is just barely visible to the naked eye. parallax measurements made by the Hipparcos spacecraft place the star at a distance of about 930 light-years (284 parsecs) away.

The spectral type of 53 Piscium is B2.5V, meaning it is a B-type main-sequence star. It is 5.4 times more massive than the Sun, and has a luminosity of almost 800 L_{☉}. Its surface temperature is over 17,000 K, typical of a B-type star.

53 Piscium is a Beta Cephei variable, varying by 0.01 magnitudes just under every two hours. For that reason it has been given the AG Piscium. It has also been found to have some variability in common with slowly pulsating B stars.
