= 2 Vulpeculae =

Star in the constellation Vulpecula

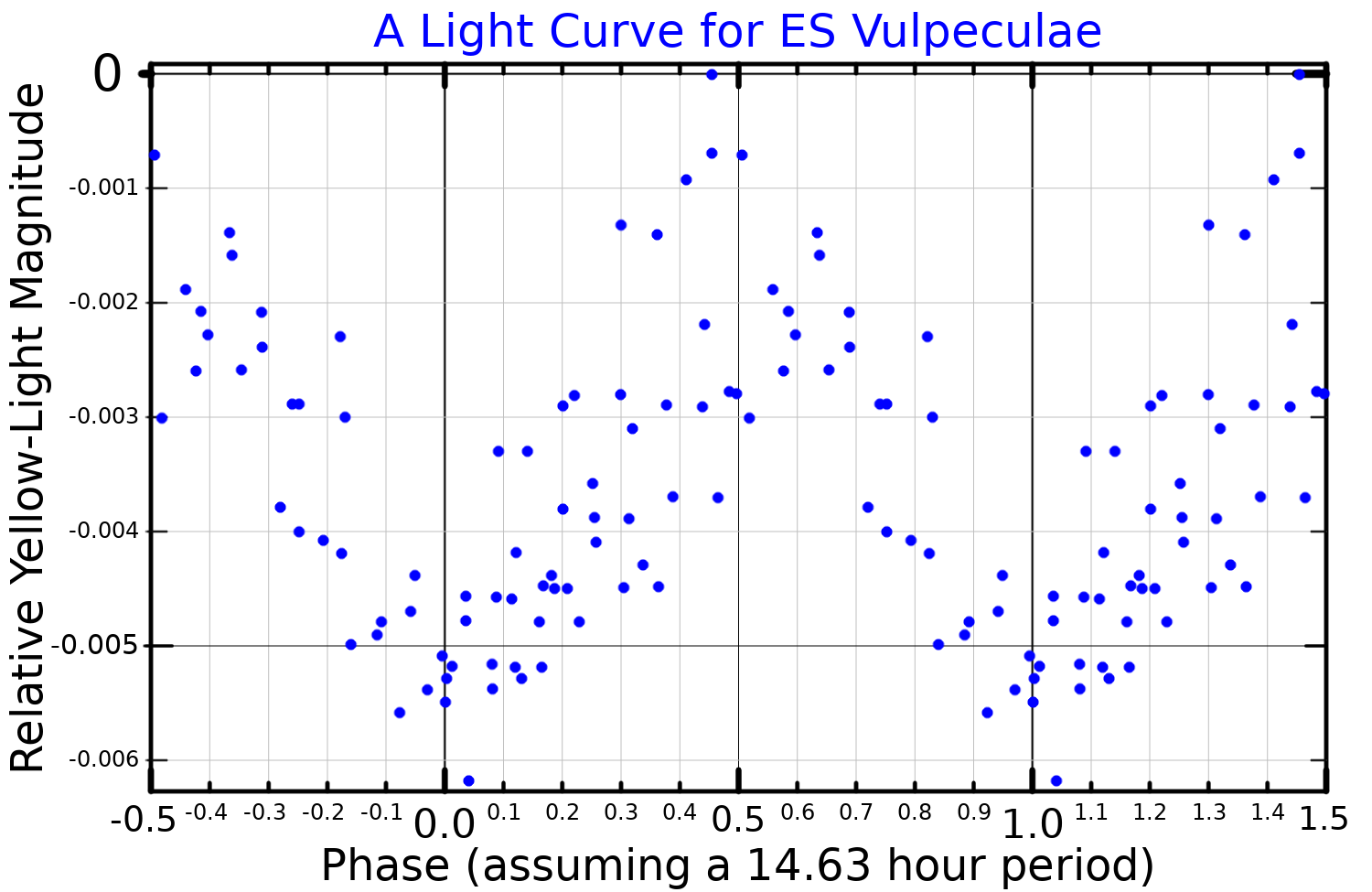
- A light curve for ES Vulpeculae, adapted from Lynds (1959)

Observation data Epoch J2000.0 Equinox ICRS
- Constellation: Vulpecula
- 2 Vul A
- Right ascension: 19^{h} 17^{m} 43.6354^{s}
- Declination: +23° 01′ 31.942″
- Apparent magnitude (V): 5.43
- 2 Vul B
- Right ascension: 19^{h} 17^{m} 43.7343^{s}
- Declination: +23° 01′ 30.860″

Characteristics
- Spectral type: B1 IV
- B−V color index: 0.020±0.003
- Variable type: β Cep

Astrometry

2 Vul A
Radial velocity (R_{v})	+1.0±4.2 km/s
Proper motion (μ)	RA: +0.956±0.041 mas/yr Dec.: −6.636±0.087 mas/yr
Parallax (π)	1.8212±0.0880 mas
Distance	1,790 ± 90 ly (550 ± 30 pc)
Absolute magnitude (M_{V})	−2.35

2 Vul B
Proper motion (μ)	RA: −0.170±0.038 mas/yr Dec.: −5.324±0.073 mas/yr
Parallax (π)	1.7131±0.0757 mas
Distance	1,900 ± 80 ly (580 ± 30 pc)

Details
Mass	12.5±0.6 M_{☉}
Luminosity (bolometric)	21,922 L_{☉}
Temperature	26,850 K
Metallicity [Fe/H]	−0.06±0.10 dex
Rotational velocity (v sin i)	270 km/s
Age	12.6±0.7 Myr

Other designations
- 2 Vul, ES Vul, BD+22°3648, HD 180968, HIP 94827, HR 7318, SAO 87036, WDS 19177+2302

Database references
SIMBAD	data

2 Vulpeculae is a binary star system in the northern constellation of Vulpecula, located around 1,800 light years away from the Sun. It is visible to the naked eye as a faint, blue-white hued star with an apparent visual magnitude of 5.43.

2 Vulpeculae is a double-lined spectroscopic binary; as of 2002, the pair had an angular separation of 1.72″ along a position angle of 127.2°.

The primary component of the binary is a rapidly rotating Be star with a stellar classification of B1 IV. It is a variable star with an amplitude of 0.06 magnitude and a period of 0.6096 days, tentatively classified as Beta Cephei variable. The variability was discovered in 1959, and it has been assigned the variable star designation ES Vulpeculae.
