= V372 Carinae =

Star in the constellation Carina

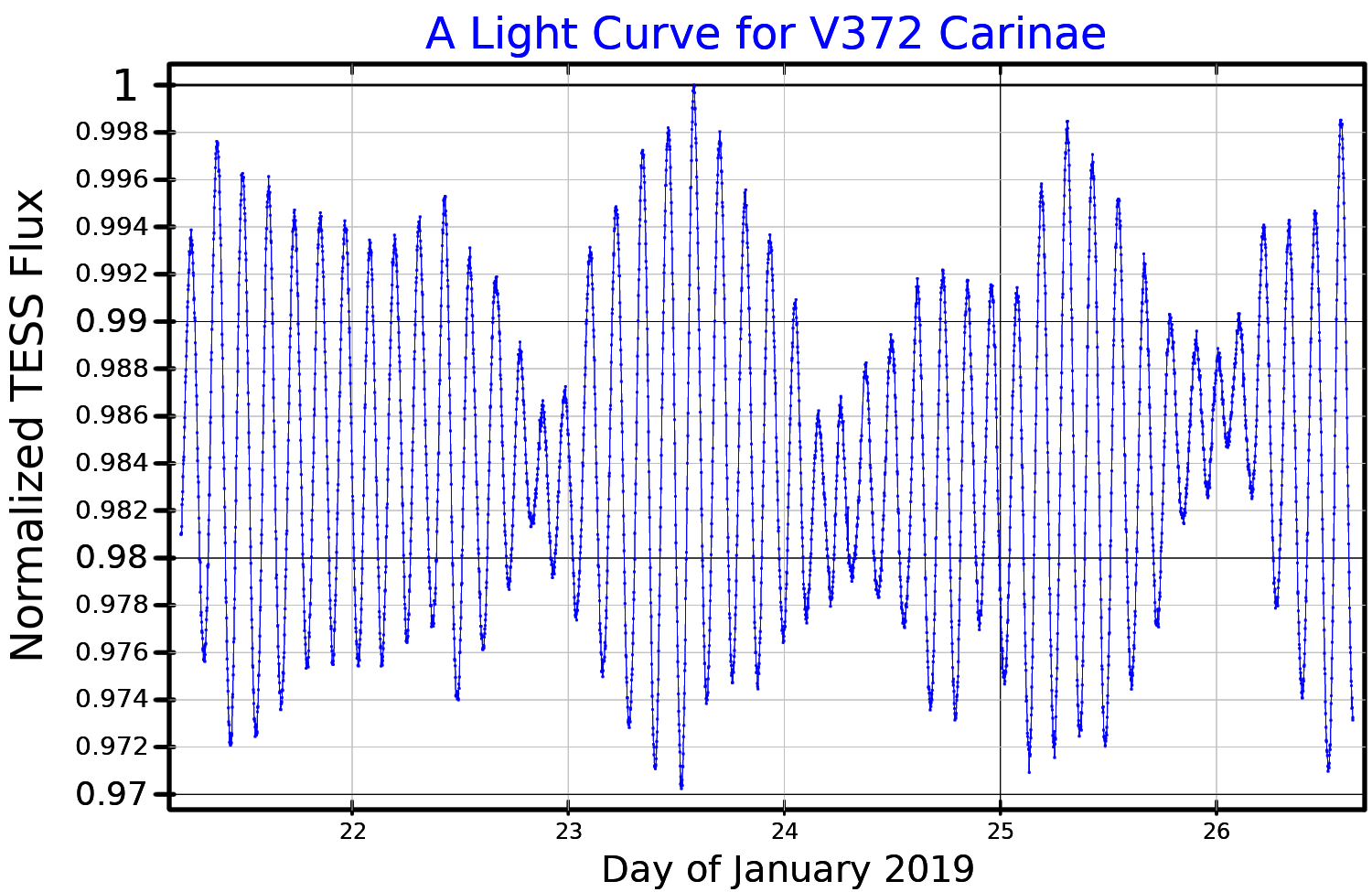
- A light curve for V372 Carinae, plotted from TESS data

Observation data Epoch J2000 Equinox ICRS
- Constellation: Carina
- Right ascension: 07^{h} 52^{m} 29.74164^{s}
- Declination: −54° 22′ 01.7889″
- Apparent magnitude (V): 5.70

Characteristics
- Evolutionary stage: main sequence
- Spectral type: B2V
- B−V color index: −0.151±0.004
- Variable type: Beta Cephei

Astrometry
Radial velocity (R_{v})	+18.0±4.3 km/s
Proper motion (μ)	RA: −4.642 mas/yr Dec.: +8.605 mas/yr
Parallax (π)	2.4079±0.0633 mas
Distance	1,350 ± 40 ly (420 ± 10 pc)
Absolute magnitude (M_{V})	−2.35

Details
Mass	8.3 M_{☉}
Radius	6.97 R_{☉}
Luminosity	4,236 L_{☉}
Surface gravity (log g)	3.65 cgs
Temperature	21,429 K
Rotational velocity (v sin i)	155 km/s
Age	15.8±2.2 Myr

Other designations
- V372 Car, CD−54°1966, HD 64722, HIP 38438, HR 3088, SAO 235579

Database references
SIMBAD	data

V372 Carinae is a single star in the southern constellation of Carina. Located around 1,350 light-years distant. It shines with a luminosity approximately 4,236 times that of the Sun and has a surface temperature of 21,429 K. It is a Beta Cephei variable. A magnitude 5.7 star, it will be faintly visible on moonless nights to the naked eye of a person located far from city lights.

In 1977, Mikołaj Jerzykiewicz and Christiaan Sterken announced their discovery that the star is variable. It was given its variable-star designation, V372 Carinae, in 1981. The brightness of V372 Carinae varies by up to three hundredths of a magnitude with a fairly regular period of 2.8 hours.
