= Chi Centauri =

Star in the constellation Centaurus

χ Centauri
- Location of χ Centauri (circled in red)

Observation data Epoch J2000.0 Equinox ICRS
- Constellation: Centaurus
- Right ascension: 14^{h} 06^{m} 02.768^{s}
- Declination: −41° 10′ 46.68″
- Apparent magnitude (V): +4.353±0.007

Characteristics
- Evolutionary stage: main sequence
- Spectral type: B2 V
- U−B color index: −0.774±0.013
- B−V color index: −0.195±0.006
- Variable type: β Cep

Astrometry
Radial velocity (R_{v})	+12 km/s
Proper motion (μ)	RA: −23.764 mas/yr Dec.: −20.041 mas/yr
Parallax (π)	6.4882±0.2164 mas
Distance	500 ± 20 ly (154 ± 5 pc)
Absolute magnitude (M_{V})	−1.50±0.14

Details
Mass	7.1±0.2 M_{☉}
Radius	3.5±0.3 R_{☉}
Luminosity	2,090+310 −270 L_{☉}
Surface gravity (log g)	4.22±0.05 cgs
Temperature	20,800±300 K
Rotational velocity (v sin i)	18±1 km/s
Age	12+4 −5 Myr

Other designations
- χ Cen, CD−40°8405, GC 19017, HD 122980, HIP 68862, HR 5285, SAO 224673

Database references
SIMBAD	data

Chi Centauri is a blue-white star in the southern constellation of Centaurus. Its name is a Bayer designation that is Latinized from χ Centauri, and abbreviated Chi Cen or χ Cen. This star is visible to the naked eye with an apparent visual magnitude that varies around +4.35. Based on parallax measurements, it is located at a distance of approximately 500 light years from the Earth. The star is drifting further away with a line of sight velocity component of +12 km/s.

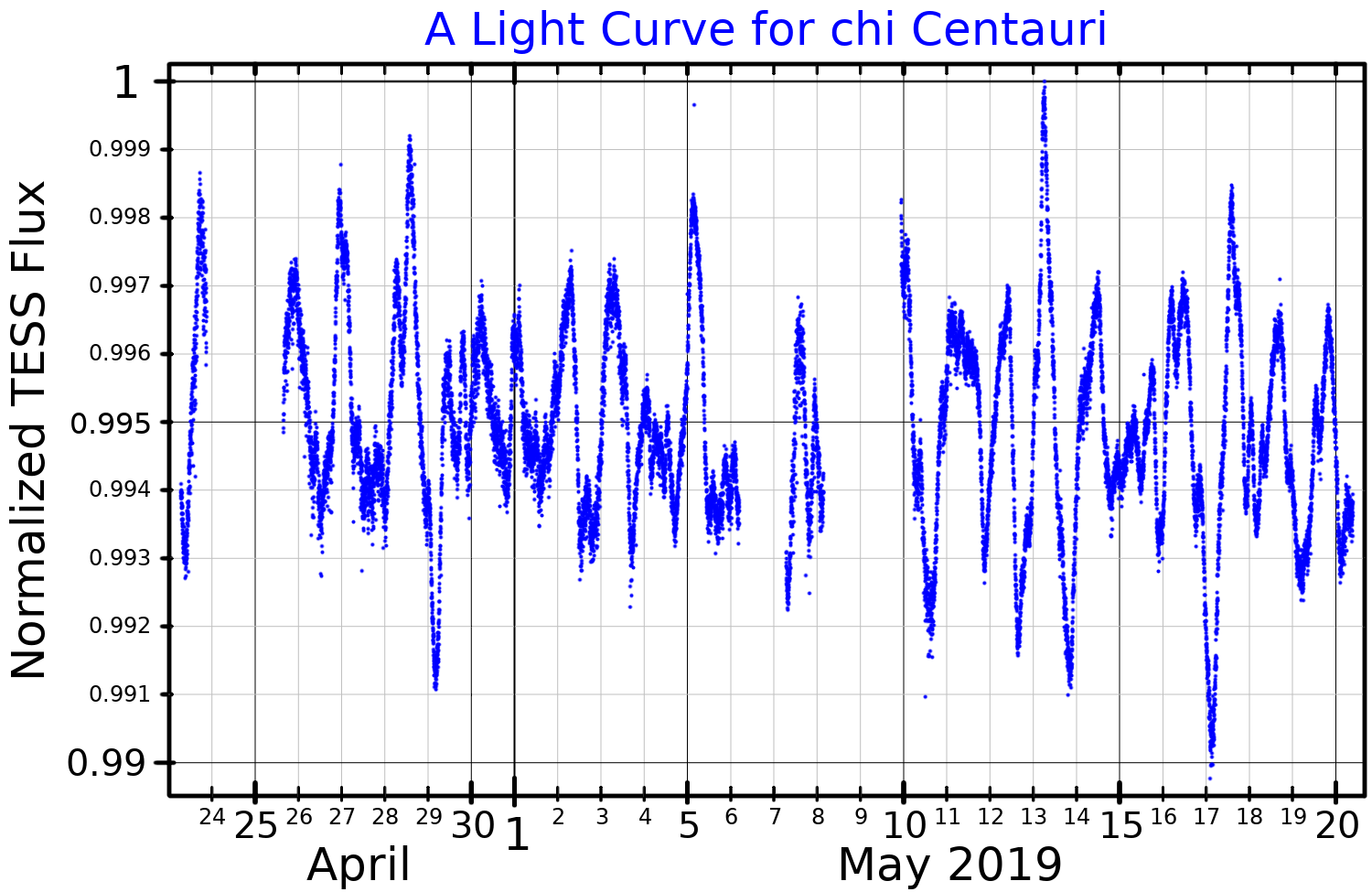
A light curve for Chi Centauri, plotted from TESS data.

χ Centauri has a stellar classification of B2 V, presenting as a young B-type main-sequence star. It is classified as a Beta Cephei type variable star and its brightness varies by 0.02 magnitudes with a period of 50.40 minutes. At the age of around 12 million years, it has 7.1 times the mass of the Sun and 3.5 times the Sun's radius. This star is radiating 2,090 times the luminosity of the Sun from its photosphere at an effective temperature of 20,800 K.

This star is a proper motion member of the Upper Centaurus–Lupus sub-group in the Scorpius–Centaurus OB association, the nearest such co-moving association of massive stars to the Sun.
