= Omega1 Cygni =

B-type subgiant star in the constellation Cygnus

Omega^{1} Cygni
- Location of ω^{1} Cygni (circled in red)

Observation data Epoch J2000.0 Equinox J2000.0 (ICRS)
- Constellation: Cygnus
- Right ascension: 20^{h} 30^{m} 03.541^{s}
- Declination: +48° 57′ 05.641″
- Apparent magnitude (V): +4.93 to 4.96

Characteristics
- Spectral type: B2.5 IV
- U−B color index: −0.68
- B−V color index: −0.09
- Variable type: β Cep (λ Eri)

Astrometry
Radial velocity (R_{v})	−21.9±2.0 km/s
Proper motion (μ)	RA: +10.058 mas/yr Dec.: +6.873 mas/yr
Parallax (π)	2.5459±0.0810 mas
Distance	1,280 ± 40 ly (390 ± 10 pc)
Absolute magnitude (M_{V})	−2.65

Details
Mass	8.1±0.2 M_{☉}
Radius	4.55 (Note: Calculated, using the Stefan-Boltzmann law and the star's effective temperature and luminosity, with respect to the solar nominal effective temperature of 5,772 K: $$\sqrt{\biggl(\frac{5,772}{16,982}\biggr)^4 \cdot 1.549} = 4.55\ R_\odot.$$) R_{☉}
Luminosity	1,549 L_{☉}
Surface gravity (log g)	2.312 cgs
Temperature	16,982 K
Metallicity [Fe/H]	0.0 dex
Rotational velocity (v sin i)	145 km/s
Age	33.2±4.5 Myr

Other designations
- ω^{1} Cyg, 45 Cygni, BD+48°3142, FK5 3641, HD 195556, HIP 101138, HR 7844, SAO 49712

Database references
SIMBAD	data

Omega^{1} Cygni is a solitary star in the northern constellation of Cygnus. Its name is a Bayer designation that is Latinized from ω^{1} Cygni and abbreviated Omega^{1} Cyg or ω^{1} Cyg. This star is visible to the naked eye with an apparent visual magnitude of 4.94. Based upon an annual parallax shift of 2.55 mas, it is estimated to lie at a distance of approximately 1,280 light years from the Sun. Relative to its neighbors, this star has a peculiar velocity of 25.7±2.2 km/s.

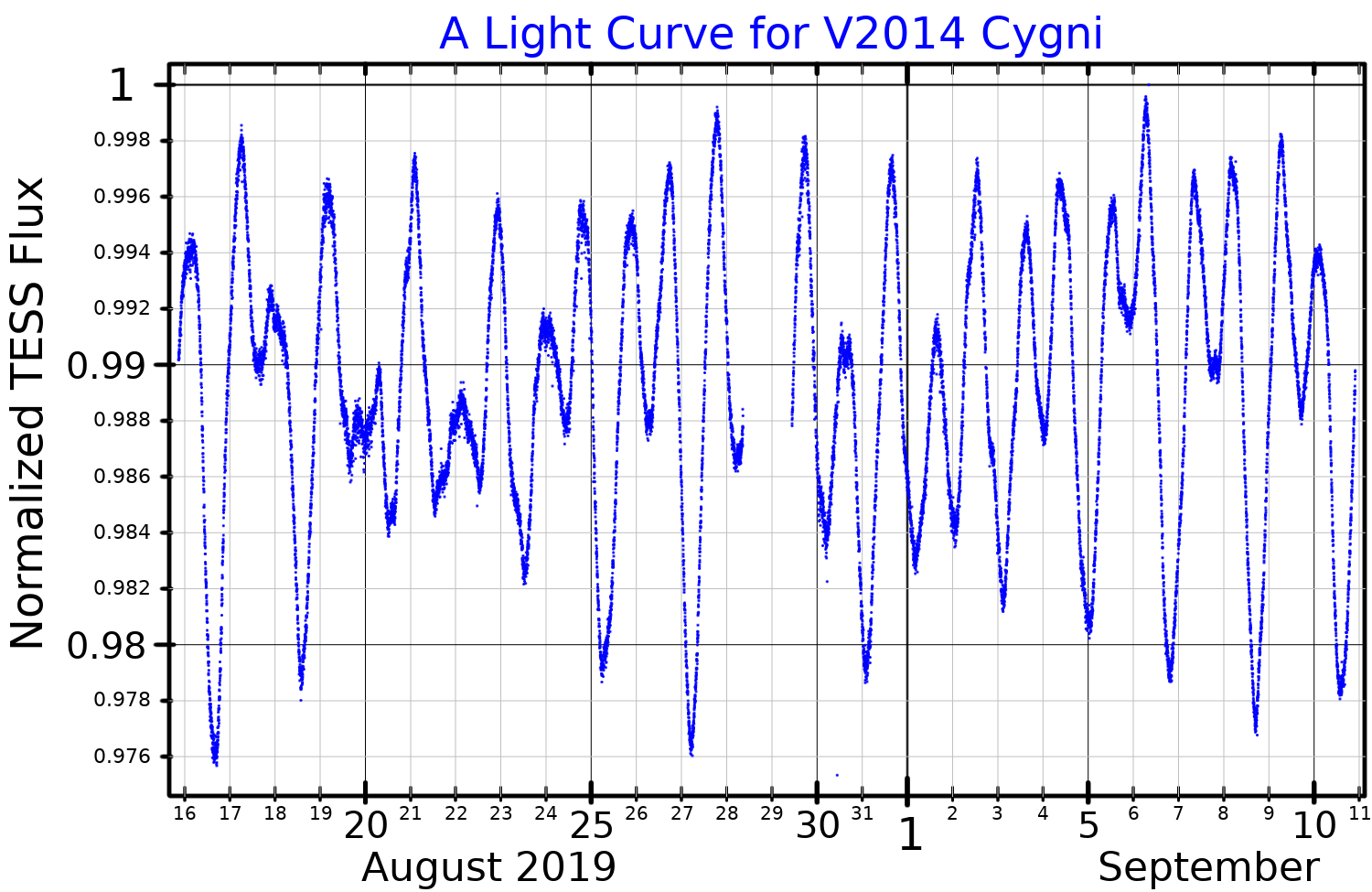
A light curve for V2014 Cygni, plotted from TESS data

This is a somewhat evolved B-type subgiant star with a stellar classification of B2.5 IV. Telting and colleagues report it as a Beta Cephei variable with a high degree of confidence as they found regular pulsations in its spectrum in a high-resolution spectroscopy study published in 2006. Its brightness varies irregularly by 0.034 magnitude every 1.137 days.
