= 19 Monocerotis =

Star in the constellation Monoceros

- Location of 19 Monocerotis (circled)

Observation data Epoch J2000 Equinox ICRS
- Constellation: Monoceros
- Right ascension: 07^{h} 02^{m} 54.77667^{s}
- Declination: −04° 14′ 21.2377″
- Apparent magnitude (V): 5.00

Characteristics
- Spectral type: B2Vn(e)or B1V
- U−B color index: −0.93
- B−V color index: −0.20
- Variable type: β Cep

Astrometry
Radial velocity (R_{v})	+24.80 km/s
Proper motion (μ)	RA: −5.05 mas/yr Dec.: +2.24 mas/yr
Parallax (π)	2.68±0.22 mas
Distance	1,220 ± 100 ly (370 ± 30 pc)
Absolute magnitude (M_{V})	−2.85

Details
Mass	12.3 M_{☉}
Radius	9±3 R_{☉}
Luminosity	4,817 L_{☉}
Surface gravity (log g)	3.662 cgs
Temperature	25,400 K
Rotational velocity (v sin i)	274±3 km/s

Other designations
- 19 Mon, V637 Mon, BD−04°1788, FK5 2547, GC 9293, HD 52918, HIP 33971, HR 2648, SAO 134106

Database references
SIMBAD	data

19 Monocerotis is a single, variable star in the equatorial constellation of Monoceros, located approximately 1,220 light years away from the Sun based on parallax. It has the variable star designation V637 Monocerotis, while 19 Monocerotis is the Flamsteed designation. This object is visible to the naked eye as a faint, blue-white hued star with a baseline apparent visual magnitude of 5.00. It is receding from the Earth with a heliocentric radial velocity of +25 km/s.

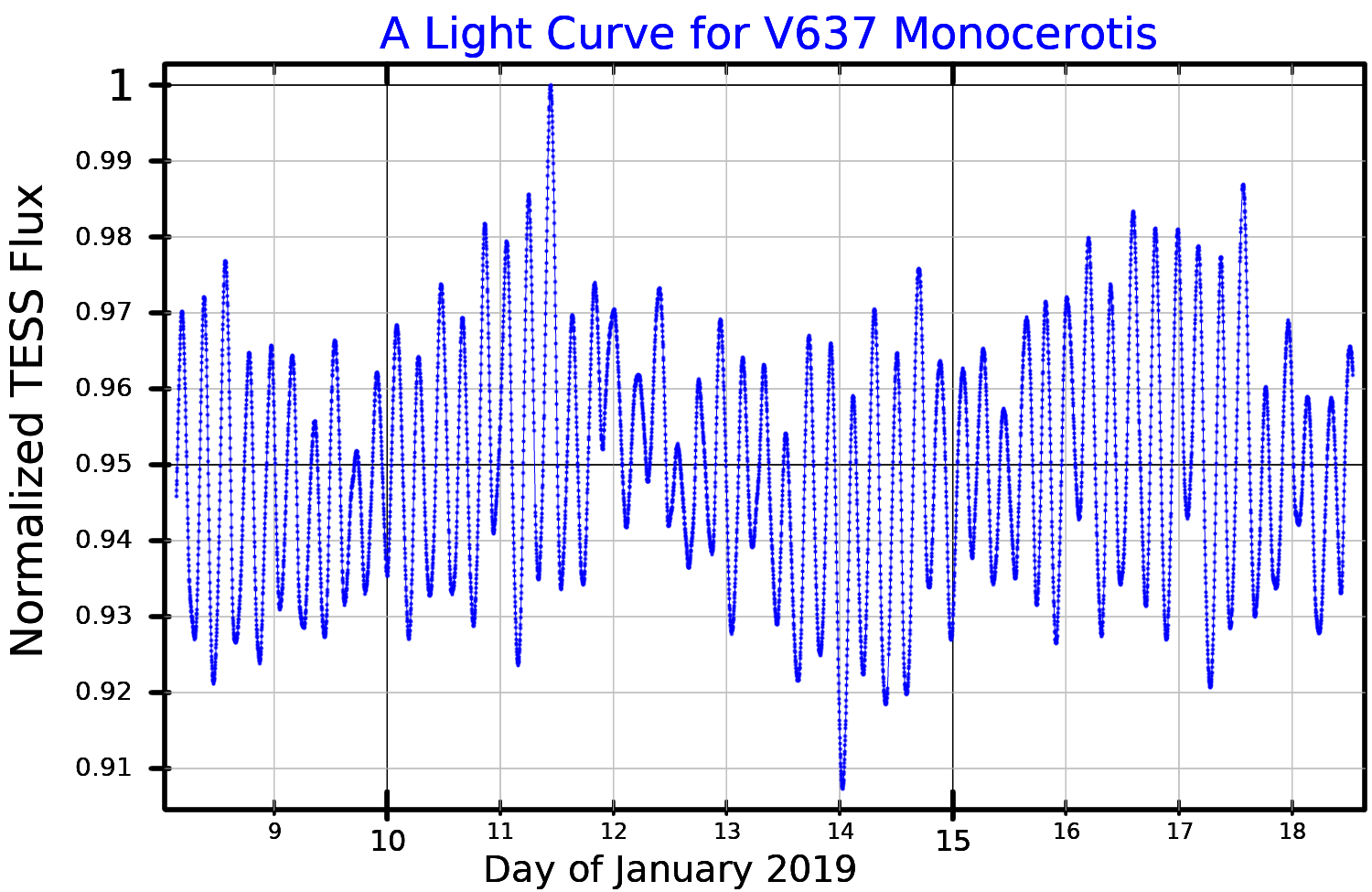
A light curve for V637 Monocerotis, plotted from TESS data

This massive, B-type main-sequence star has a stellar classification of B1 V. It is a Beta Cephei variable, ranging from 5.01 to 4.96 magnitude with a period of 0.19 days. Closer examination shows there are three frequencies present, consisting of 5.22994, 0.17017, and 4.88956 cycles per day. At one point it was thought to be a marginal Be star, but this was not confirmed. The star is spinning rapidly with a projected rotational velocity of 274 km/s. It has 12.3 times the mass of the Sun and is radiating 4,817 times the Sun's luminosity from its photosphere at an effective temperature of 25,400 K.
