= 16 Lacertae =

Triple star system in the constellation Lacerta

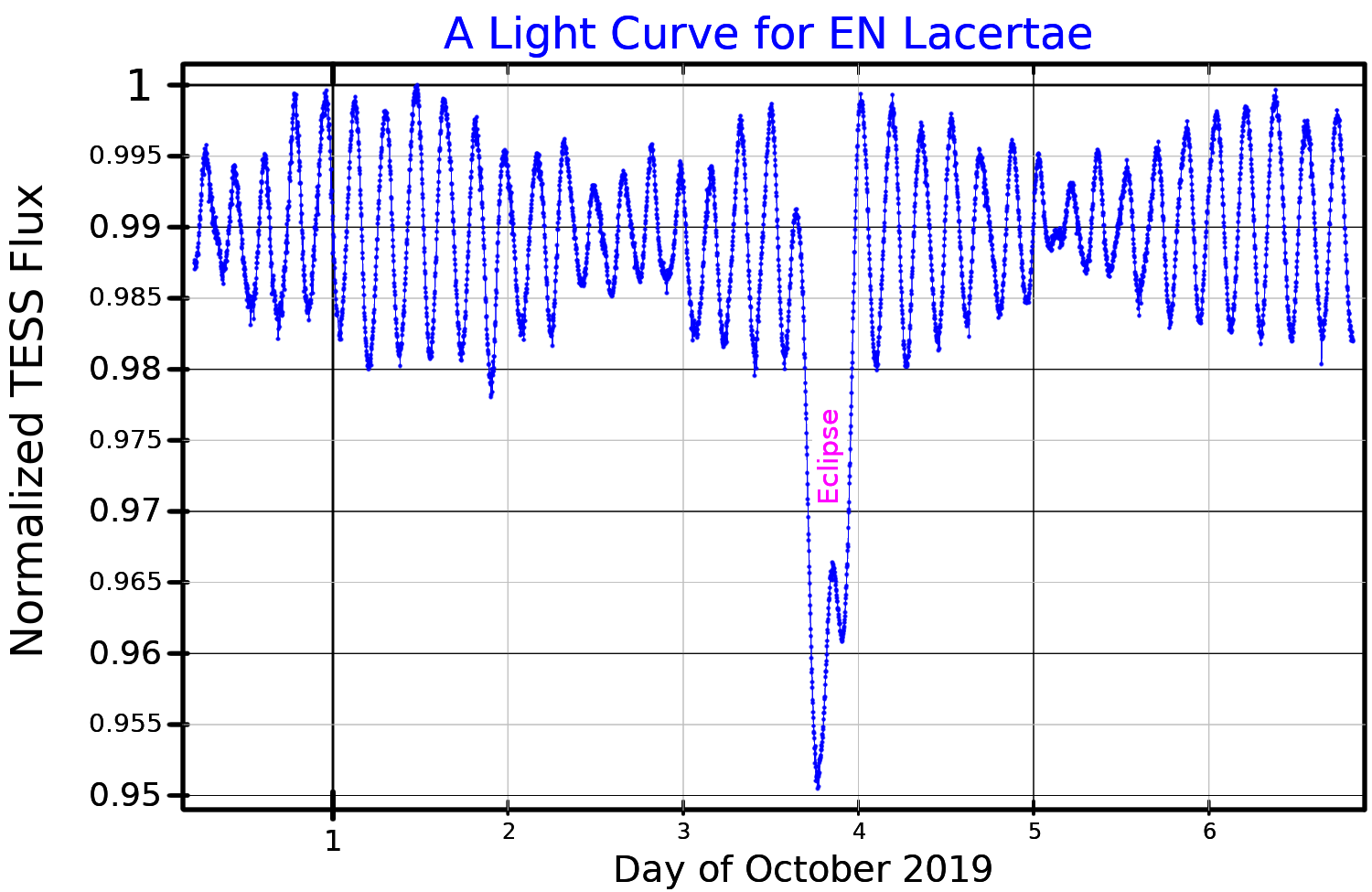
- A light curve for EN Lacertae, plotted from TESS data

Observation data Epoch J2000.0 Equinox ICRS
- Constellation: Lacerta
- Right ascension: 22^{h} 56^{m} 23.62929^{s}
- Declination: +41° 36′ 13.9482″
- Apparent magnitude (V): 5.587±0.015

Characteristics
- Spectral type: B2 IV + F6–7 + F0
- Variable type: β Cep + Algol

Astrometry
Radial velocity (R_{v})	−12.45±0.04 km/s
Proper motion (μ)	RA: −1.188 mas/yr Dec.: −4.290 mas/yr
Parallax (π)	2.0692±0.0865 mas
Distance	1,580 ± 70 ly (480 ± 20 pc)
Absolute magnitude (M_{V})	−2.67±0.14

Orbit
Period (P)	12.0969 d
Eccentricity (e)	0.0539±0.0026
Periastron epoch (T)	61.4±2.1
Semi-amplitude (K_{1}) (primary)	23.85±0.05 km/s

Details

16 Lac A
Mass	9.5±0.03 M_{☉}
Radius	5.6±0.4 R_{☉}
Luminosity	7,762+1,151 −1,002 L_{☉}
Surface gravity (log g)	3.95±0.05 cgs
Temperature	23,000±200 K
Metallicity [Fe/H]	0.00±0.08 dex
Rotational velocity (v sin i)	12±1 km/s

Other designations
- 16 Lac, EN Lac, BD+40°4949, HD 216916, HIP 113281, HR 8725, SAO 52512

Database references
SIMBAD	data

16 Lacertae is a triple star system in the northern constellation of Lacerta, located about 1,580 light years from the Sun. It has the variable star designation EN Lacertae; 16 Lacertae is the Flamsteed designation. This system is visible to the naked eye as a faint blue-white hued star with a maximum apparent visual magnitude of +5.587. It is moving closer to the Earth with a heliocentric radial velocity of –12 km/s.

The binary nature of the brighter component was discovered in 1910 by astronomer Oliver J. Lee at Yerkes Observatory. The first orbital elements were published by Otto Struve and Nicholay T. Bobrovnikov in 1925. This is a single-lined spectroscopic binary with an orbital period of 12.1 days and a small eccentricity of 0.05. It forms an eclipsing binary variable, although only the eclipse of the primary component has been detected. This component is a Beta Cephei variable star with three dominant pulsation modes having frequencies of around six per day. It has a stellar classification of B2 IV, matching a B-type subgiant star with 9.5 times the mass of the Sun and 5.6 times the Sun's radius.

The unseen secondary is an F-type star of class F6–7. The tertiary component is a magnitude 11.4 star with a class of F0. As of 2008, it was located at an angular separation of 27.6″ from the primary.
