= Beta Cephei variable =

Type of variable star

Beta Cephei variables, also known as Beta Canis Majoris stars, are variable stars that exhibit small rapid variations in their brightness due to pulsations of the stars' surfaces, thought due to the unusual properties of iron at temperatures of 200,000 K in their interiors. These stars are usually hot blue-white stars of spectral class B and should not be confused with Cepheid variables, which are named after Delta Cephei and are luminous supergiant stars.

== Properties ==
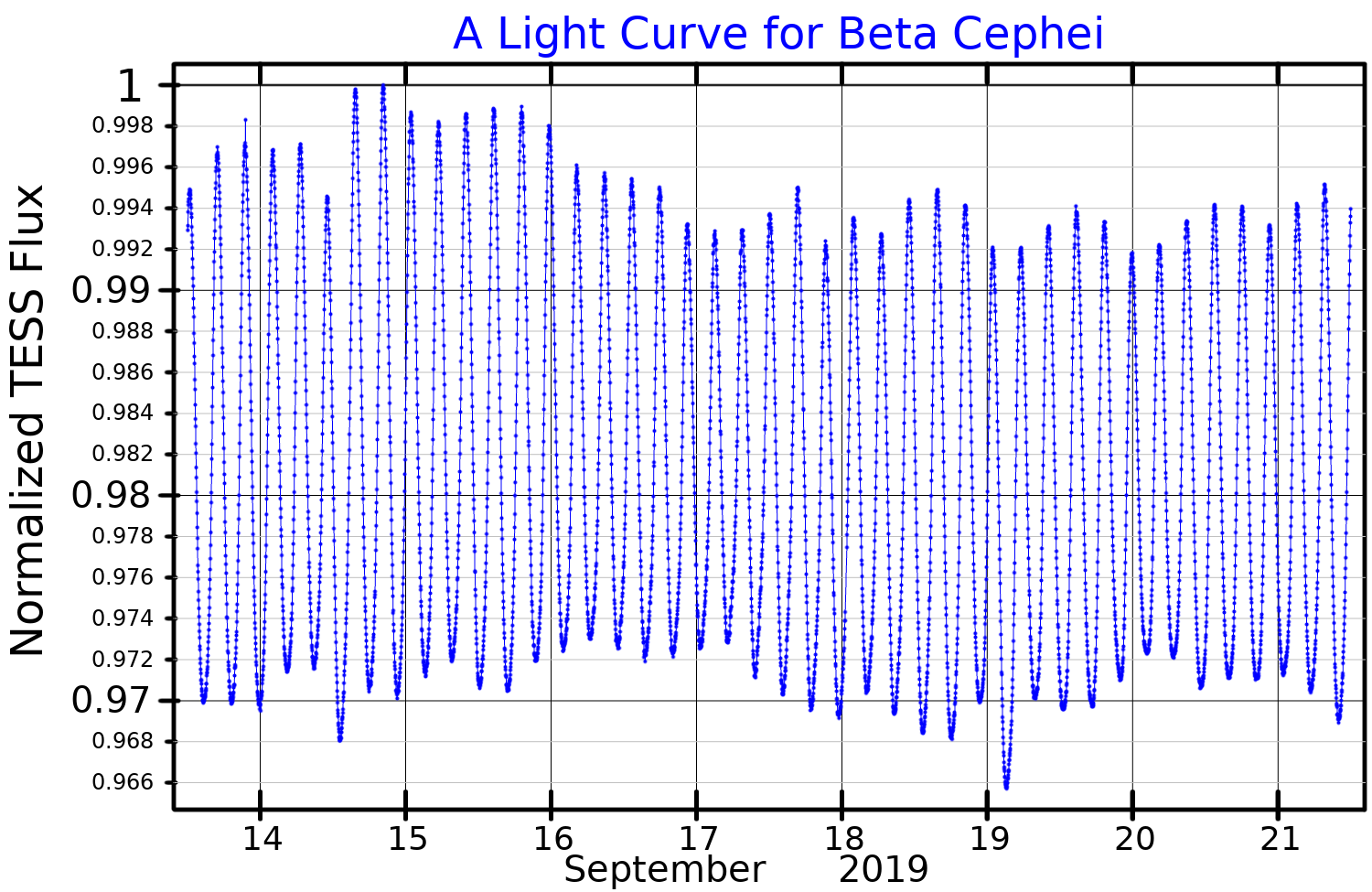
A light curve for Beta Cephei, plotted from TESS data

Beta Cephei variables are somewhat evolved stars of masses between about 7 and 20 M_{$_\odot$} (that is, 7–20 times as massive as the Sun). Among their number are some of the brightest stars in the sky, such as Beta Crucis and Beta Centauri; Spica is also classified as a Beta Cephei variable but mysteriously stopped pulsating in 1970. Typically, they change in brightness by 0.01 to 0.3 magnitudes with periods of 0.1 to 0.3 days (2.4–7.2 hours). The prototype of these variable stars, Beta Cephei, shows variation in apparent magnitude from +3.16 to +3.27 with a period of 4.57 hours. The point of maximum brightness occurs when the star is smallest and hottest. Their variation in brightness is much greater—up to 1 magnitude—in ultraviolet wavelengths. A small number of stars have been identified with periods shorter than one hour, corresponding to 1/4 of the fundamental radial pulsation period and 3/8 of the fundamental period. They also have relatively low amplitudes and a very narrow range of spectral types B2-3 IV-V. They are known as the short period group and the GCVS acronym BCEPS.

The pulsations of Beta Cephei variables are driven by the kappa mechanism and p-mode pulsations. At a depth within the star where the temperature reaches 200,000 K, there is an abundance of iron. Iron at these temperatures will increase (rather than decrease) in opacity, resulting in the buildup of energy within the layer. This results in increased pressure that pushes the layer back out again, the cycle repeating itself in a matter of hours. This is known as the Fe bump or Z bump (Z standing for the star's metallicity). The similar slowly pulsating B stars show g-mode pulsations driven by the same iron opacity changes, but in less massive stars and with longer periods.

== History of observations ==
American astronomer Edwin Brant Frost discovered the variation in radial velocity of Beta Cephei in 1902, initially concluding it was a spectroscopic binary. Paul Guthnick was the first to detect a variation in brightness, in 1913. Beta Canis Majoris and Sigma Scorpii were found to be variable not long afterwards, Vesto Slipher noted in 1904 that Sigma Scorpii's radial velocity was variable, and R.D. Levee and Otto Struve concluded this was due to the star's pulsations in 1952 and 1955 respectively. These variables were often called Beta Canis Majoris variables because Beta Canis Majoris was the most closely studied example in the first half of the 20th century, though its location in the southern sky meant that its lowness in the sky hampered observations. However, Beta Cephei was the first member of the class to be discovered and so they are generally called Beta Cephei variables—despite the similarity of name (and risk of confusion) with Cepheid variables.

Cecilia Payne-Gaposchkin and Sergei Gaposchkin catalogued 17 probable members of the class in their 1938 Variable Stars, though classified them with Delta Scuti variables. 16 Lacertae was another star extensively studied before 1952. The number known jumped from 18 to 41 in 1966. Otto Struve studied these stars extensively in the 1950s, however research declined after his death.

Christiaan L. Sterken and Mikolaj Jerzykiewicz classed 59 stars as definite and 79 more as suspected Beta Cephei variables in 1993. Stankov listed 93 members of the class in a 2005 catalogue, plus 77 candidates and 61 poor or rejected stars. Six stars, namely Iota Herculis, 53 Piscium, Nu Eridani, Gamma Pegasi, HD 13745 (V354 Persei) and 53 Arietis had been found to exhibit both Beta Cephei and SPB variability.

In 2021 β Cru became the first star of any kind to have its pulsation modes identified using polarimetric asteroseismology.

=== List of Beta Cephei variables ===
Designation (name)	Constellation	Discovery	Maximum Apparent magnitude (m_{V})	Minimum Apparent magnitude (m_{V})	Period (hours)	Spectral class	Comment
β CMa (Mirzam)	Canis Major	1909 (William Wallace Campbell)	1^{m}.93	2^{m}.00	6.031	B1II-III	Pulsations of 6.03, 6.00, and 4.74 hours.
ξ^{1} CMa	Canis Major		4^{m}.33	4^{m}.36	5.030	B0.5IV	
15 CMa	Canis Major		4^{m}.79	4^{m}.84	4.429	B1III-IV	
V376 Car	Carina		4^{m}.91	4^{m}.96	0.4992	B2IV-V	BCEPS star
V372 Car	Carina		5^{m}.70		2.78	B2III	
β Cen (Hadar)	Centaurus		0^{m}.61		3.768	B1II	
ε Cen	Centaurus		2^{m}.29	2^{m}.31	4.070	B1V	
κ Cen	Centaurus		3^{m}.13	3^{m}.14	2.288	B2IV	
χ Cen	Centaurus		4^{m}.40		0.84	B2V	BCEPS star
β Cep (Alfirk)	Cepheus	1902 (Edwin Brant Frost)	3^{m}.16	3^{m}.27	4.572	B2IIIe	Prototype
δ Cet	Cetus		4^{m}.05	4^{m}.1	3.867	B2IV	
β Cru (Mimosa)	Crux		1^{m}.23	1^{m}.31	4.589	B0.5IV	
δ Cru (Imai)	Crux		2^{m}.78	2^{m}.84	3.625	B2IV	
ω^{1} Cyg	Cygnus		4^{m}.94			B2.5IV	confirmed on hi res spectroscopy.
ν Eri	Eridanus		3^{m}.87	4^{m}.01	4.164	B2III	Multiperiodic; also a slowly pulsating B star
12 Lac	Lacerta		5^{m}.16	5^{m}.28	4.634	B1.5III	Also a slowly pulsating B star
16 Lac	Lacerta		5^{m}.30 (B)	5^{m}.52 (B)	4.109	B2IV	
α Lup (Uridim)	Lupus	1956 (Bernard Pagel)	2^{m}.29	2^{m}.34	6.235	B1.5III	
δ Lup	Lupus		3^{m}.20	3^{m}.24	3.972	B2IV	
ε Lup	Lupus		3^{m}.36	3^{m}.38	2.316	B2IV + B3V	Triple star system; primary is a spectroscopic binary
ι Lup	Lupus		3^{m}.54	3^{m}.3.55		B2.5IV	not recorded as BCEP since 1997
τ^{1} Lup	Lupus		4^{m}.54	4^{m}.58	4.257	B2IV	
19 Mon	Monoceros		4^{m}.96	5^{m}.01	4.589	B1IV-Vea	
α Mus	Musca		2^{m}.68	2^{m}.73	2.167	B2IV-V	initially questionable, confirmed on hi res spectroscopy.
θ Oph	Ophiuchus		3^{m}.25	3^{m}.31	3.373	B2IV	
η Ori	Orion		3^{m}.31	3^{m}.35	7.247	B0.5Vea + B3V	Quadruple star; also an Algol variable; component Ab is the pulsating star
γ Peg (Algenib)	Pegasus	1953 (D. Harold McNamara)	2^{m}.78	2^{m}.89	3.643	B2IV	Also a slowly pulsating B star
ε Per (Áldu)	Perseus		2^{m}.88	3^{m}.00	3.847	B0.5V	
PT Pup	Puppis		5^{m}.72	5^{m}.74	3.908	B2III	
λ Sco (Shaula)	Scorpius		1^{m}.59	1^{m}.65	5.129	B1.5IV + PMS + B2IV	Triple system; also an Algol variable
κ Sco	Scorpius		2^{m}.41	2^{m}.42	4.795	B1.5III	
σ Sco (Alniyat)	Scorpius	1904 (Vesto Slipher)	2^{m}.86	2^{m}.94	5.923	B1III	Quadruple system
Spica	Virgo		0^{m}.85	1^{m}.05	6.520	B1IV	Brightness variations stopped in 1970
BW Vul	Vulpecula		6^{m}.44	6^{m}.68	4.8	B2IIIv	Beta Cephei variable with largest change in radial velocity

=== List of former, excluded or candidate Beta Cephei variables ===
Designation (name)	Constellation	Discovery	Maximum Apparent magnitude (m_{V})	Minimum Apparent magnitude (m_{V})	Period (hours)	Spectral class	Comment
ι CMa	Canis Major		4^{m}.36	4^{m}.40	33.6	B3Ib/II	Not considered a β Cep variable
FN CMa	Canis Major		5^{m}.38	5^{m}.42	36.7	B0.5IV	No longer considered a β Cep variable
χ Car	Carina		3^{m}.46		2.42	B2IV	Not considered a β Cep variable
V343 Car	Carina		4^{m}.30		57.11	B1.5III	Not considered a β Cep variable
ζ Cha	Chamaeleon		5^{m}.06	5^{m}.17	25.91	B5V	considered as a SBP as of 2011
λ Cru	Crux		4^{m}.60	4^{m}.64	9.482	B4Vne	Not considered a β Cep variable
θ^{2} Cru	Crux		4^{m}.70	4^{m}.74	2.134	B2IV	Not considered a β Cep variable
25 Cyg	Cygnus		5^{m}.09	5^{m}.21	5.04	B3IVe	γ Cas variable, not considered a β Cep variable
ι Her (Tianbang)	Hercules		2^{m}.93			B3IV	No longer classed as Beta Cephei type
η Hya	Hydra		4^{m}.27	4^{m}.33	~4	B3V	No longer classed as Beta Cephei type
NW Pup	Puppis		5^{m}.04	5^{m}.18	3.00	B3Vea	Also a rotating ellipsoidal variable, not considered a β Cep variable
α Pyx	Pyxis		3^{m}.67	3^{m}.70		B1.5III	Candidate β Cephei variable
Merope	Taurus		4^{m}.17	4^{m}.19		B6IVe	B(e) star, not Beta Cephei type
IS Vel	Vela		5^{m}.23		2.592	B1IVn	Candidate β Cephei variable
HR 3440 (HW Vel)	Vela		5^{m}.46	5^{m}.52	6.275	B6V	Candidate β Cephei variable
2 Vul	Vulpecula		5^{m}.36	5^{m}.48	14.63	O8IV-B0.5IVeV	B(e) star, not Beta Cephei type
