= 12 Lacertae =

Star in the constellation Lacerta

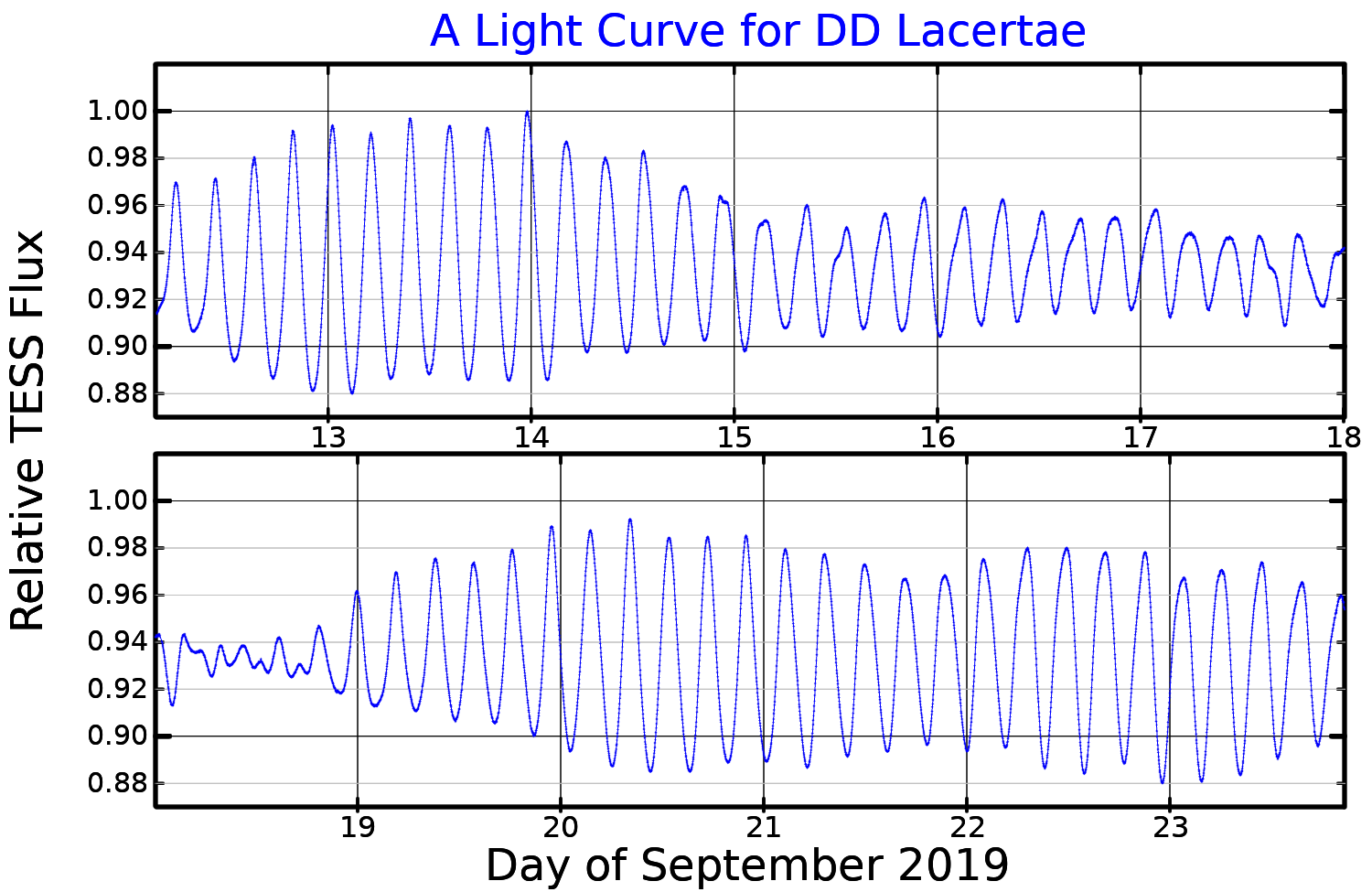
- A light curve for DD Lacertae, plotted from TESS data

Observation data Epoch J2000 Equinox J2000
- Constellation: Lacerta
- Right ascension: 22^{h} 41^{m} 28.64951^{s}
- Declination: +40° 13′ 31.6097″
- Apparent magnitude (V): 5.228

Characteristics
- Spectral type: B1.5III
- B−V color index: −0.142
- Variable type: β Cep

Astrometry
| Radial velocity (R_{v}) | −12.5±2.2 km/s |
| Proper motion (μ) | RA: −2.005±0.150 mas/yr Dec.: −4.512±0.117 mas/yr |
| Parallax (π) | 2.5877±0.1327 mas |
| Distance | 1,260 ± 60 ly (390 ± 20 pc) |
| Absolute magnitude (M_{V}) | −3.02 |

Details
| Mass | 9.5±0.3 M_{☉} |
| Radius | 8.4 R_{☉} |
| Luminosity (bolometric) | 8,877 L_{☉} |
| Surface gravity (log g) | 3.817±0.047 cgs |
| Temperature | 23,809±450 K |
| Metallicity [Fe/H] | −0.41 dex |
| Rotational velocity (v sin i) | 44±6 km/s |
| Age | 21.8±3.1 Myr |

Other designations
- 12 Lac, DD Lac, BD+39°4912, GC 31670, HD 214993, HIP 112031, HR 8640, SAO 72627, WDS J22415+4014A

Database references
| SIMBAD | data |

12 Lacertae is a wide binary star system in the northern constellation of Lacerta, located roughly 1,260 light years away from the Sun based on parallax. It is visible to the naked eye as a dim, blue-white hued point of light with a baseline apparent visual magnitude of 5.23. The system is drifting closer to the Earth with a mean heliocentric radial velocity of –12.5. It is a probable member of the I Lacertae OB association (Lac OB1).

The primary component is a Beta Cephei variable with a stellar classification of B1.5III, matching a B-type star with the luminosity class of a giant star. It has been known to be variable for more than a century and has been extensively studied. The variable radial velocity of the star was discovered by W. S. Adams in 1912, and the light variations were established by 1919. The pulsational nature of the variability was shown by P. Ledoux in 1951, which led to one of the first world-wide observing campaigns with the star as its target. Dutch mathematician F. J. M. Barning analyzed the resulting data in 1963 and found four separate cycles of variation. By 1994, six periods had been confirmed.

The variable star designation of the primary is DD Lacertae, while 12 Lacertae is the Flamsteed designation. In general terms it varies in magnitude from 5.16 down to 5.28 with a period of 4.63 hours. As many as eleven different frequencies have been detected, with the dominant cycle showing a frequency of 5.179034 cycles per day. Three of the frequencies form an equally-spaced triplet with cycles of 5.179, 5.334, and 5.490 per day, although this alignment appears to be a coincidence. It is a hybrid pulsator, showing mixed behaviors of a Beta Cephei variable and a slowly pulsating B-type star.

The primary is a massive star, having 9.5 times the mass of the Sun and an age of only 22 million years old. It has about 8.4 times the girth of the Sun. The averaged quadratic field strength of the surface magnetic field is (2,352.3±1,604.9)×10^{−4} T. It is radiating 8,877 times the luminosity of the Sun from its photosphere at an effective temperature of 23,809 K. The estimated rotational velocity of the primary at the equator is 52±5 km/s; about 10% of its break-up velocity. However, seismic models suggest the core region is rotating much more rapidly with a rotational velocity of up to 100 km/s, and thus the star is undergoing differential rotation.

The companion is an A-type main-sequence star with a stellar classification of A3V and visual magnitude 9.2. As of 2008, it had an angular separation of 69″ from the primary. There is a faint infrared nebulosity at a separation of 0.6 light-years from the pair that is most likely a bow shock.
