= BW Vulpeculae =

Star in the constellation Vulpecula

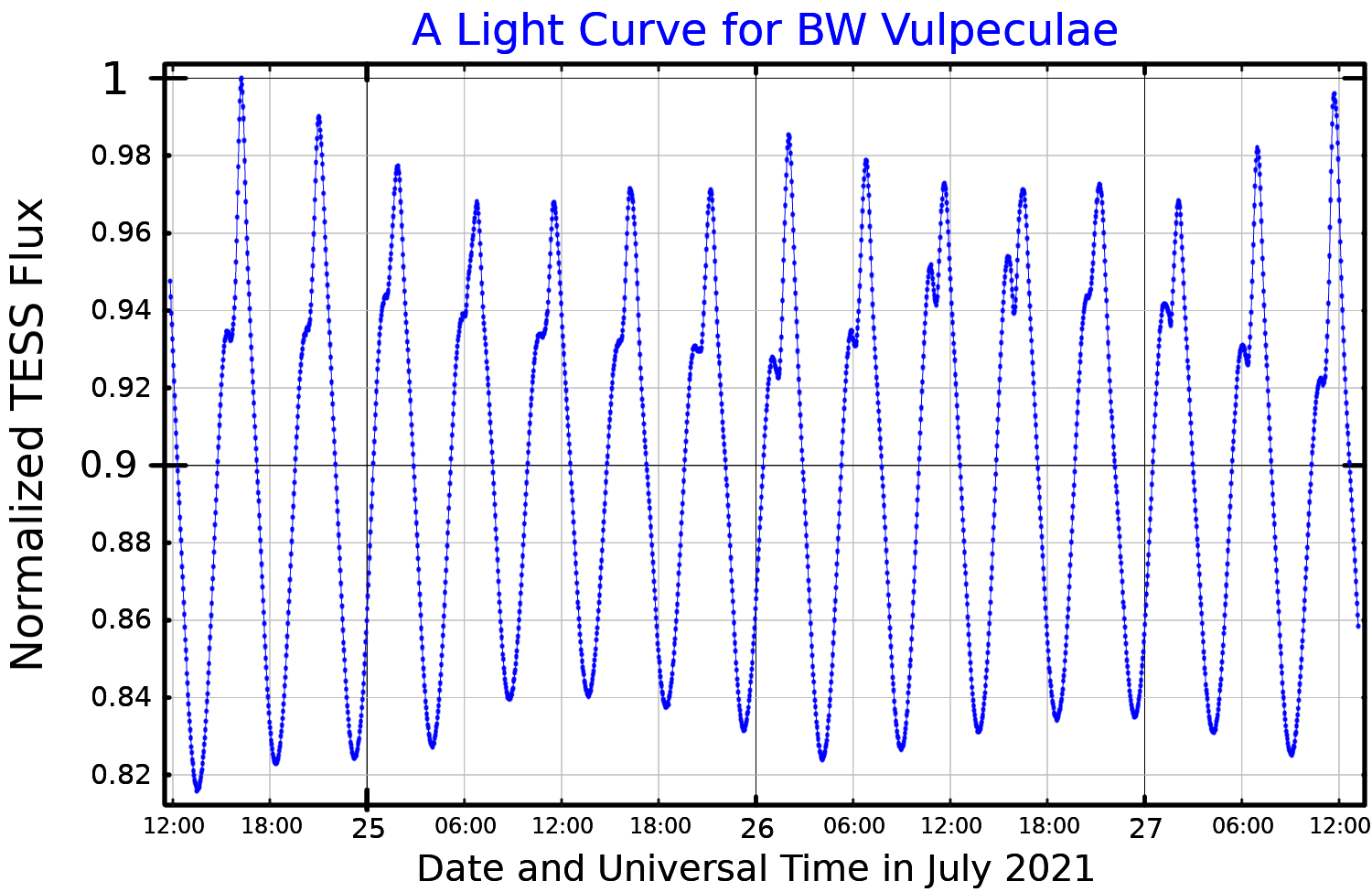
- A light curve for BW Vulpeculae, plotted from TESS data

Observation data Epoch J2000 Equinox J2000
- Constellation: Vulpecula
- Right ascension: 20^{h} 54^{m} 22.39491^{s}
- Declination: +28° 31′ 19.1827″
- Apparent magnitude (V): 6.44 – 6.68

Characteristics
- Spectral type: B2 IIIv
- U−B color index: −0.147±0.011
- Variable type: β Cep

Astrometry
Radial velocity (R_{v})	−6.1±3.0 km/s
Proper motion (μ)	RA: +0.437 mas/yr Dec.: −4.981 mas/yr
Parallax (π)	1.1494±0.0652 mas
Distance	2,800 ± 200 ly (870 ± 50 pc)
Absolute magnitude (M_{V})	−2.47

Details
Mass	6.8±0.1 or 11−14 M_{☉}
Luminosity	515.14 L_{☉}
Surface gravity (log g)	3.71 cgs
Temperature	23,014+919 −883 K
Metallicity [Fe/H]	0.07±0.12 dex
Rotational velocity (v sin i)	24±6 km/s
Age	3.4±2.5 Myr

Other designations
- AAVSO 2050+28, BW Vul, BD+27° 3909, HD 199140, HIP 103191, HR 8007, SAO 89265

Database references
SIMBAD	data

BW Vulpeculae or BW Vul, is a variable star in the northern constellation of Vulpecula. It is near the lower limit of visibility to the naked eye with a typical apparent visual magnitude of about 6.5. Based on an annual parallax shift of 1.15 mas, the distance to BW Vul is about 2,800 light years. It is moving closer to the Earth with a baseline heliocentric radial velocity of around −6 km/s.

This is a B-type giant star with a stellar classification of B2 IIIv, where the 'v' suffix indicates variability in spectral features. Various authors have printed mass estimates ranging from 11 to 14 times the mass of the Sun, although Tetzlaff et al. (2011) gives a mass of just 6.8 M_{☉}. It is about 3.4 million years old and is spinning with a projected rotational velocity of 24 km/s. The star is typically radiating 515 times the Sun's luminosity from its photosphere at an effective temperature of 23,014 K.

The variability of this star was announced in 1937, at the 58th Meeting of the American Astronomical Society by Canadian astronomer, Robert Methven Petrie. It is a Beta Cephei variable that ranges between magnitudes 6.44 and 6.68 over a period of 4.8 hours. For unknown reasons, the periodicity of the star has undergone sudden changes, followed by long periods of stability. BW Vul is one of the most extreme β Cephei stars in terms of variability of light and radial velocity. This is hypothesized as being due to the star's relatively high metallicity, meaning the abundance of elements other than hydrogen and helium. A distinctive feature of its radial velocity cycle is a unique "standstill" feature, which is caused by a shockwave generated by infall of material from a previous cycle.
