= V376 Carinae =

Star in the constellation Carina

- Location of V376 Carinae (circled in red)

Observation data Epoch J2000 Equinox ICRS
- Constellation: Carina
- Right ascension: 08^{h} 56^{m} 58.41666^{s}
- Declination: −59° 13′ 45.6032″
- Apparent magnitude (V): 4.69 (4.87 + 6.58)

Characteristics
- Spectral type: B2V + B9.5V
- B−V color index: −0.182±0.004

Astrometry
| Radial velocity (R_{v}) | +26.8±2.8 km/s |
| Proper motion (μ) | RA: −8.409±0.406 mas/yr Dec.: +8.421±0.322 mas/yr |
| Parallax (π) | 5.0495±0.1667 mas |
| Distance | 650 ± 20 ly (198 ± 7 pc) |
| Absolute magnitude (M_{V}) | −1.64 |

Details

A
| Mass | 7.8±0.1 M_{☉} |
| Luminosity (bolometric) | 2,998 L_{☉} |
| Temperature | 21,150 K |
| Age | 12.5±1.6 Myr |

Other designations
- b^{1} Car, V376 Carinae, CD−58°2347, FK5 1233, GC 12405, HD 77002, HIP 43937, HR 3582, SAO 236436, CCDM J08570-5914, WDS J08570-5914

Database references
| SIMBAD | data |

V376 Carinae is a binary star system in the southern constellation of Carina. It has the Bayer designation b^{1} Carinae; V376 Carinae is the variable star designation. The system is visible to the naked eye as a faint point of light with a combined apparent magnitude of +4.69. The distance to this system from the Sun is approximately 650 light years based on parallax. It is drifting further away with a radial velocity of +27 km/s.

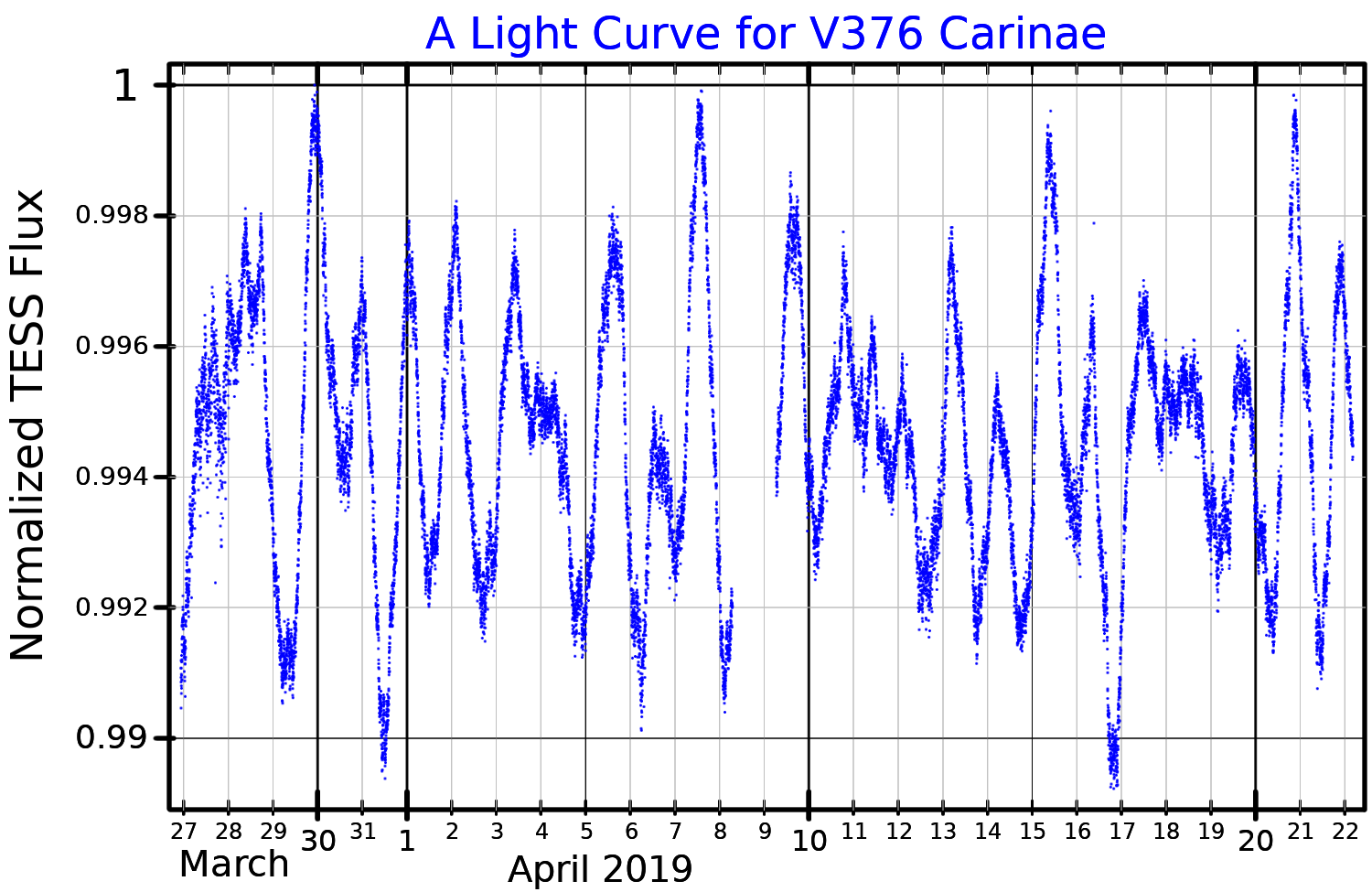
A light curve for V376 Carinae, plotted from TESS data

The magnitude 4.87 primary, designated component A, is a B-type main-sequence star with a stellar classification of B2V. During a search for Beta Cephei variables in the southern sky, it was initially classed as a very short period variable. However, this variability was not confirmed by subsequent observations. Samus et al. (2017) now suspect it is a constant star that was assigned a variable designation in haste. It has an estimated age of 12.5 million years with 7.8 times the mass of the Sun. The star is radiating nearly three thousand times the Sun's luminosity from its photosphere at an effective temperature of 21,150 K.

The companion star, component B, was discovered by Scottish astronomer James Dunlop in 1836. It has a class of B9.5V with an apparent magnitude of +6.58. As of 2010, the secondary had an angular separation of 40.1″ from the primary along a position angle of 76°.
