= HR 3159 =

Star in the constellation Carina

- Location of HR 3159 (circled in red)

Observation data Epoch J2000.00 Equinox ICRS
- Constellation: Carina
- Right ascension: 08^{h} 00^{m} 19.96579^{s}
- Declination: −63° 34′ 02.8274″
- Apparent magnitude (V): 4.81

Characteristics
- Evolutionary stage: main sequence
- Spectral type: B4V
- B−V color index: −0.173±0.007

Astrometry
Radial velocity (R_{v})	+22.1±2.8 km/s
Proper motion (μ)	RA: −1.762 mas/yr Dec.: +19.905 mas/yr
Parallax (π)	6.9936±0.0826 mas
Distance	466 ± 6 ly (143 ± 2 pc)
Absolute magnitude (M_{V})	−1.11

Details
Mass	6.3±0.1 M_{☉}
Radius	3.77±0.27 R_{☉}
Luminosity	912 L_{☉}
Surface gravity (log g)	4.03±0.05 cgs
Temperature	16,983 K
Metallicity [Fe/H]	−0.09±0.06 dex
Rotational velocity (v sin i)	43 km/s
Age	17.2±1.3 or 176 Myr

Other designations
- D Car, CPD−63°866, FK5 2624, GC 10893, HD 66591, HIP 39138, HR 3159, SAO 250069

Database references
SIMBAD	data

HR 3159 is a single star in the southern constellation of Carina, positioned near the southern constellation border with Volans. It has the Bayer designation D Carinae; HR 3159 is the Bright Star Catalogue designation. This object has a blue-white hue and is visible to the naked eye with an apparent visual magnitude of +4.81. It is located at a distance of approximately 466 light years from the Sun based on parallax, and is drifting further away with a radial velocity of 22 km/s.

This object is a B-type main-sequence star with a stellar classification of B4V, which indicates it is undergoing core hydrogen fusion. The star has a radius of nearly four times the radius of the Sun, and over six times the Sun's mass. Age estimates range from 17 up to 176 million years old, and it is spinning with a projected rotational velocity of 43 km/s. It is radiating 912 times the luminosity of the Sun from its photosphere at an effective temperature of 16,983 K.
