= V343 Carinae =

Star in the constellation Carina

- Location of V343 Carinae (circled in red)

Observation data Epoch J2000 Equinox J2000
- Constellation: Carina
- Right ascension: 08^{h} 40^{m} 37.02758^{s}
- Declination: −59° 45′ 39.6067″
- Apparent magnitude (V): 4.31

Characteristics
- Spectral type: B1.5III
- B−V color index: −0.117±0.005
- Variable type: Constant

Astrometry
| Radial velocity (R_{v}) | +12.9±0.7 km/s |
| Proper motion (μ) | RA: −6.63 mas/yr Dec.: +5.32 mas/yr |
| Parallax (π) | 2.26±0.11 mas |
| Distance | 1,440 ± 70 ly (440 ± 20 pc) |
| Absolute magnitude (M_{V}) | −3.91 |

Details
| Mass | 12.5±0.6 M_{☉} |
| Luminosity | 6,322.92 L_{☉} |
| Temperature | 27,600±3,630 K |
| Age | 15.7±0.1 Myr |

Other designations
- d Car, V343 Car, CPD−59°1080, FK5 2685, GC 11964, HD 74375, HIP 42568, HR 3457, SAO 236181, CCDM J08406-5946, WDS J08406-5946A

Database references
| SIMBAD | data |

V343 Carinae is a blue-white star or star system in the southern constellation of Carina. It has the Bayer designation d Carinae, while V343 Carinae is a variable star designation. The star is visible to the naked eye with an apparent visual magnitude of 4.31. The distance to this object is approximately 1,440 light years based on parallax. It is drifting further away with a radial velocity of +13 km/s.

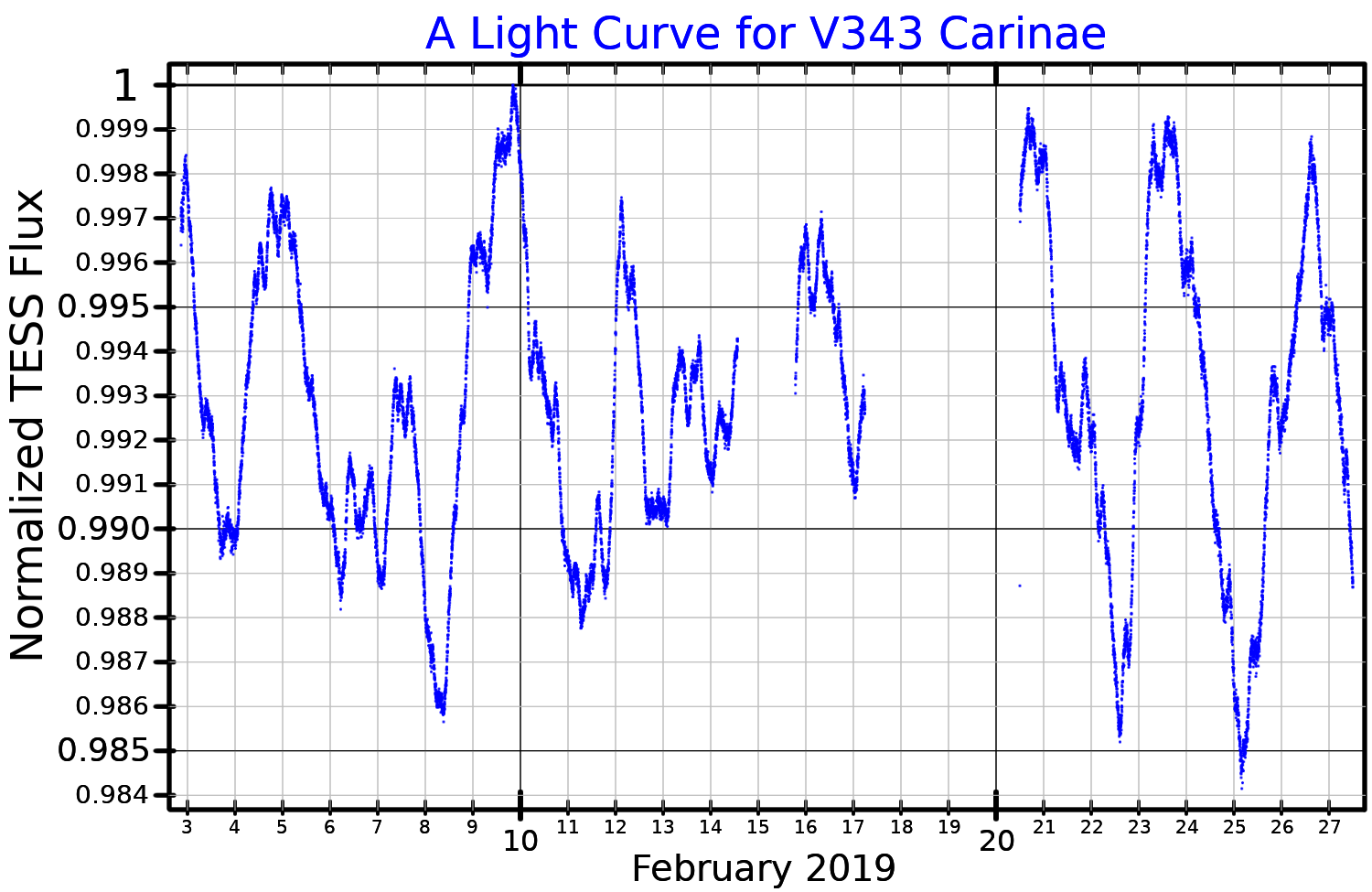
A light curve for V343 Carinae, plotted from TESS data

This star was originally thought to be a Beta Cephei variable and a suspected eclipsing binary with an orbital period of 133.92 days. It is now considered as probably constant. Measurements indicate that at most it is a microvariable star with an amplitude of 0.0041 in visual magnitude and a period of 0.42029 cycles per day. Eggleton and Tokovinin (2008) catalogued this as a single star, albeit with some uncertainty. However, Chini et al. (2012) listed it as a single-lined spectroscopic binary system.

The visible component of V343 Carinae has a stellar classification of B1.5III, matching a massive blue giant. It has 12.5 times the mass of the Sun and is an estimated 16 million years old. The star is radiating 6,323 times the Sun's luminosity from its photosphere at an effective temperature of 27,600 K. It has a visual magnitude 13.3 companion at an angular separation of 16.4″ along a position angle of 339°, as of 2010.
