= 15 Canis Majoris =

Variable star in the constellation Canis Major

- Location of 15 Canis Majoris (circled in red)

Observation data Epoch J2000.0 Equinox ICRS
- Constellation: Canis Major
- Right ascension: 06^{h} 53^{m} 32.907^{s}
- Declination: −20° 13′ 27.32″
- Apparent magnitude (V): +4.79 – 4.84

Characteristics
- Spectral type: B1IV
- U−B color index: −0.96
- B−V color index: −0.212±0.013
- Variable type: β Cep

Astrometry
Radial velocity (R_{v})	28.00 km/s
Proper motion (μ)	RA: −5.46±0.16 mas/yr Dec.: +3.58±0.17 mas/yr
Parallax (π)	2.68±0.24 mas
Distance	1,200 ± 100 ly (370 ± 30 pc)
Absolute magnitude (M_{V})	−3.02

Details
Mass	12.8±1.2 M_{☉}
Radius	6.8±1.2 R_{☉}
Luminosity	20,000+12,000 −7,400 L_{☉}
Surface gravity (log g)	3.89±0.20 cgs
Temperature	26,100±1,200 K
Rotational velocity (v sin i)	20±12 km/s

Other designations
- 15 CMa, EY CMa, BD−20°1616, FK5 2532, GC 9034, HD 50707, HIP 33092, HR 2571, SAO 172520

Database references
SIMBAD	data

15 Canis Majoris is a variable star in the southern constellation of Canis Major, located roughly 1,200 light years away from the Sun. It has the variable star designation EY Canis Majoris; 15 Canis Majoris is the Flamsteed designation. The star is visible to the naked eye as a faint, blue-white hued star with an apparent visual magnitude of +4.8. It is moving away from the Earth with a heliocentric radial velocity of 28 km/s.

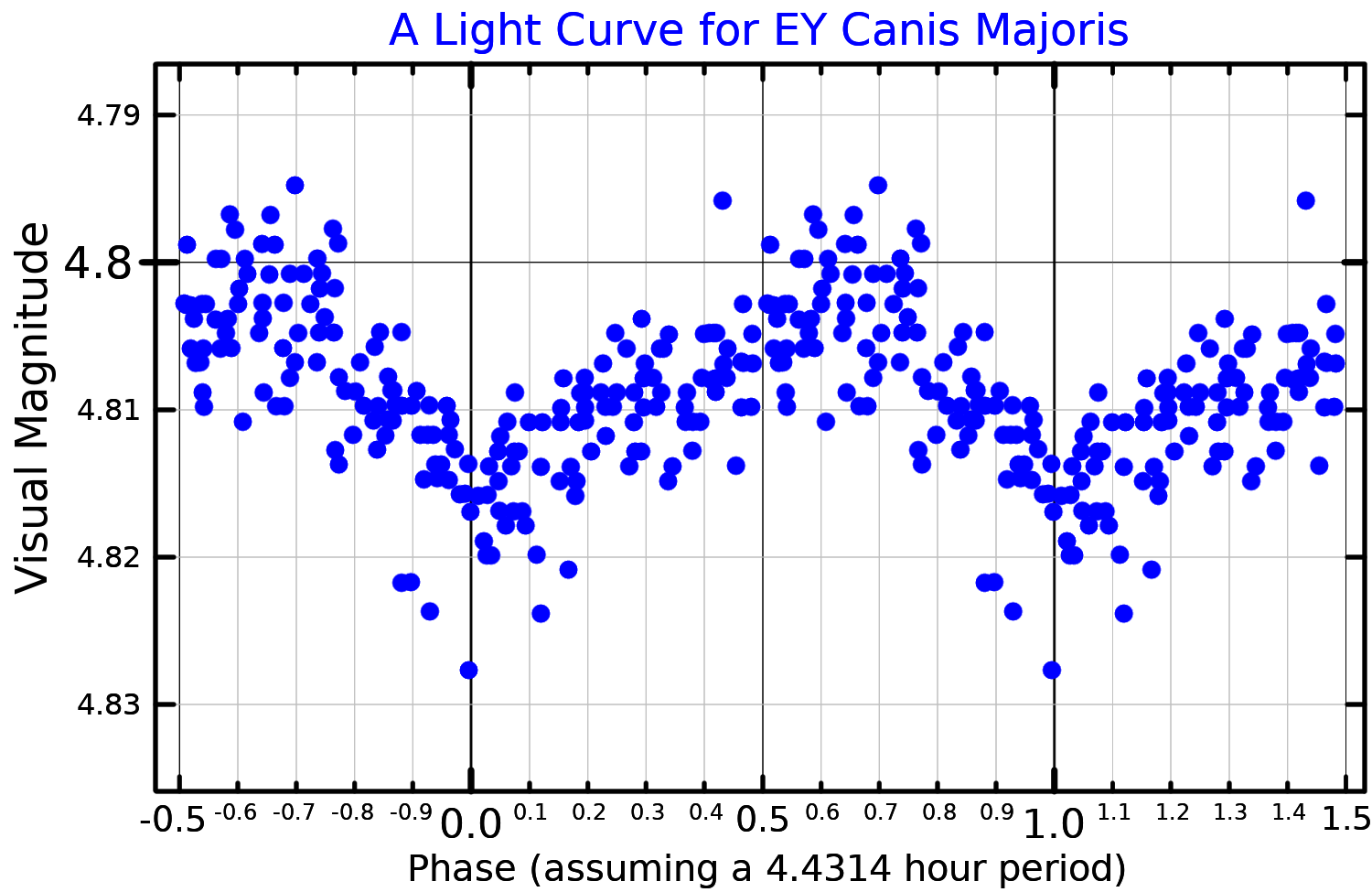
A visual band light curve for EY Canis Majoris (1992)

This is a B-type star with a stellar classification of B1 IV. Merle F. Walker discovered that 15 Canis Majoris is a variable star in 1955, and he published that discovery in 1956. It is classified as a Beta Cephei type variable star and its brightness varies from magnitude +4.79 down to +4.84 with a period of 4.430 h. The star has 12.8 times the mass of the Sun and 6.8 times the Sun's radius. It is radiating 20,000 times the luminosity of the Sun from its photosphere at an effective temperature of 26,100 K.
