= EZ Canis Majoris =

Binary star system in the constellation Canis Major

- Location of EZ CMa (circled)

Observation data Epoch J2000.0 Equinox J2000.0 (ICRS)
- Constellation: Canis Major
- Right ascension: 06^{h} 54^{m} 13.04410^{s}
- Declination: −23° 55′ 42.0150″
- Apparent magnitude (V): 6.91 6.71 to 6.95

Characteristics
- Evolutionary stage: Wolf–Rayet
- Spectral type: WN4-s
- U−B color index: −0.89
- B−V color index: −0.28
- Variable type: UGZ?

Astrometry
Proper motion (μ)	RA: −4.431±0.057 mas/yr Dec.: 2.884±0.092 mas/yr
Parallax (π)	0.4119±0.0503 mas
Distance	4,900 ly (1,500 pc)
Absolute magnitude (M_{V})	−5.33

Orbit
Period (P)	3.63 d
Semi-major axis (a)	0.13 au
Eccentricity (e)	0.10
Inclination (i)	74°

Details

WR
Mass	23 M_{☉}
Radius	3.25 R_{☉}
Luminosity (bolometric)	620,000 L_{☉}
Temperature	89,100 K

companion
Mass	1.5 M_{☉}

Other designations
- EZ CMa, ALS 98, CD−23°4553, CEL 1426, Collinder 121 4, CPD−23°1588, GC 9061, HD 50896, Hen 3-20, HIP 33165, HR 2583, LBN 1052, MR 6, PPM 251223, SAO 172546, SH 2-308, TYC 6522-3270-1, WR 6

Database references
SIMBAD	data

EZ Canis Majoris (abbreviated to EZ CMa, also designated as WR 6) is binary system in the constellation of Canis Major. The primary is a Wolf–Rayet star and it is one of the ten brightest Wolf-Rayet stars, brighter than apparent magnitude 7.

== Binary system ==
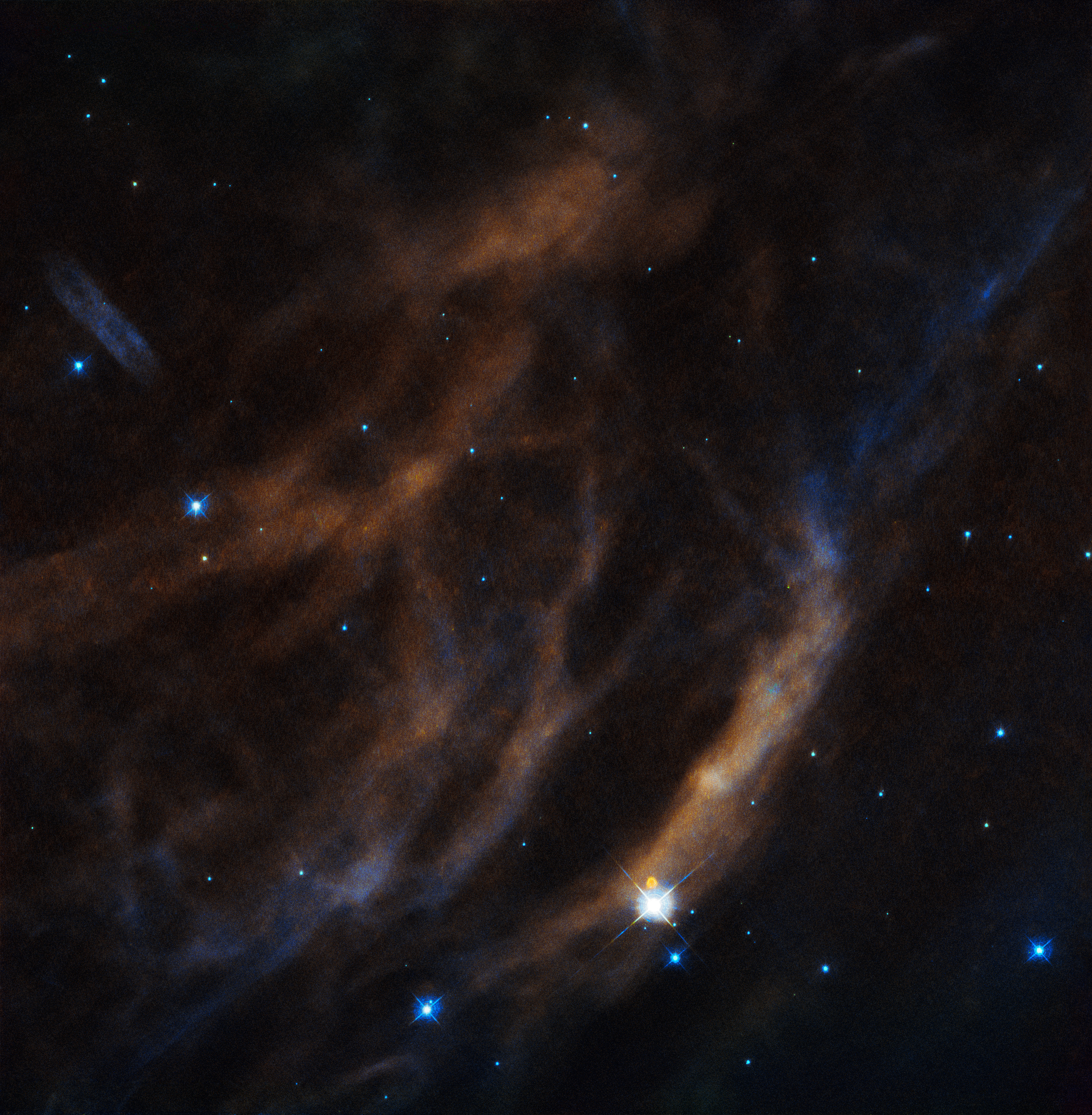
Detail of one edge of the bubble blown by EZ CMa. EZ CMa is off frame to the left (east).

L. W. Ross announced his discovery that the star's brightness varies, in 1961. EZ CMa has an apparent visual magnitude which varies between 6.71 and 6.95 over a period of 3.766 days, along with changes in the spectrum. It has been proposed that it could be a binary star, with a neutron star as companion that would complete an orbit around the Wolf-Rayet with that period, being the cause of those variations. The General Catalogue of Variable Stars lists it as a possible cataclysmic variable on this basis. It has been argued that the companion does not exist and spectral variations are caused by activity on the star's surface.

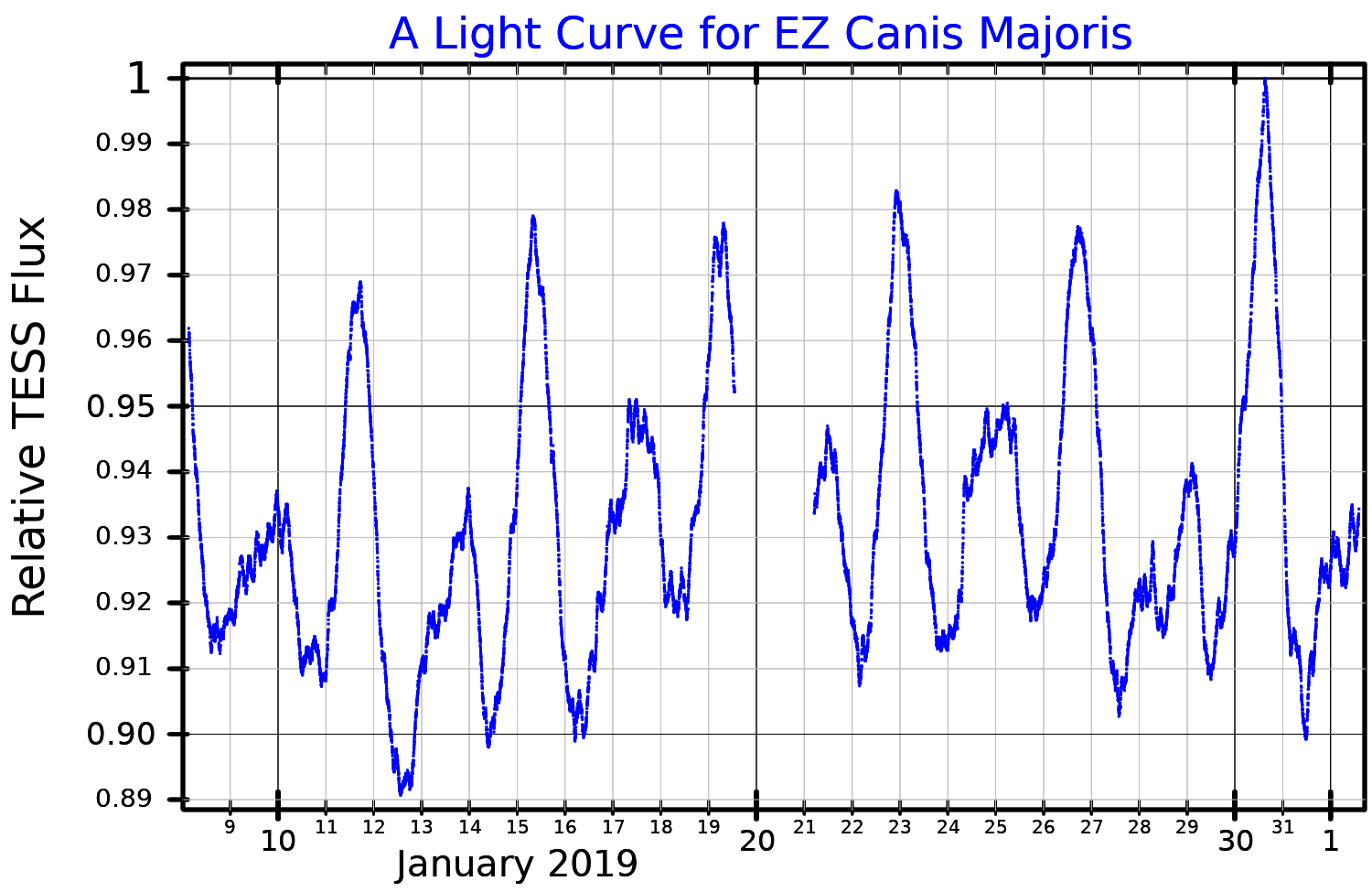
A light curve for EZ Canis Majoris, plotted from TESS data

Observations of the light variations over a four-month period from late 2015 to early 2016 confirmed the clear 3.76 d variations. This was interpreted as a 3.66 d orbital period with rapid apsidal precession completing a full rotation in about 100 days. The orbit is inclined at around 60–74 degrees and there are two eclipses during each orbit.

== Wolf Rayet star and nebula ==
The spectral type of WN4 indicates an extremely hot star, and this leads to a very high luminosity, mostly emitted as ultraviolet radiation. The spectrum shows a star entirely devoid of hydrogen at the surface.

EZ CMa is surrounded by a faint bubble nebula, a small H_{II} region blown by stellar winds up to 1,700 km/s and ionised by the intense UV radiation. This is catalogued as Sharpless Sh2-308, or just S308. It is likely to be a member of the very scattered open cluster Collinder 121, found around the orange supergiant ο^{1} CMa.
