= Omicron Canis Majoris =

The Bayer designation Omicron Canis Majoris (ο CMa / ο Canis Majoris) is shared by two stars, in the constellation Canis Major:

- ο^{1} Canis Majoris
- ο^{2} Canis Majoris

They are separated by 2.06° on the sky.

ο^{1} Canis Majoris was member of asterism 軍市 (Jūn Shì), Market for Soldiers, Well mansion. ο^{2} Canis Majoris was not any member of asterism.
