= Sigma Canis Majoris =

Variable star in the constellation Canis Major

σ Canis Majoris
- Location of σ Canis Majoris (circled)

Observation data Epoch J2000 Equinox ICRS
- Constellation: Canis Major
- Right ascension: 07^{h} 01^{m} 43.14804^{s}
- Declination: −27° 56′ 05.3892″
- Apparent magnitude (V): 3.43 to 3.51

Characteristics
- Evolutionary stage: Supergiant
- Spectral type: K5 Ib
- U−B color index: +1.88
- B−V color index: +1.73
- Variable type: LC

Astrometry
Radial velocity (R_{v})	+22.11 km/s
Proper motion (μ)	RA: −5.714 mas/yr Dec.: +4.890 mas/yr
Parallax (π)	2.5085±0.1590 mas
Distance	1,290+76 −80 ly (395.6+23.2 −24.4 pc)
Absolute magnitude (M_{V})	−5.14

Details
Mass	5.61+0.51 −0.49 M_{☉} 8.4±1.0, 9.1±2.0 M_{☉}
Radius	297 R_{☉}
Luminosity	15,800 L_{☉}
Surface gravity (log g)	0.32 cgs
Temperature	3,792±125 K
Metallicity [Fe/H]	+0.16 dex
Age	83.2 Myr

Other designations
- Nganurganity, Unurgunite, σ CMa, 22 CMa, CD−27°3544, FK5 1183, HD 52877, HIP 33856, HR 2646, SAO 172797, ADS 5719

Database references
SIMBAD	data

Sigma Canis Majoris is a variable star in the southern constellation of Canis Major. It has the proper name Nganurganity [ˈŋanuɾˌɡ̊aniɟ̊] (historically written Unurgunite /ˌʌnərˈɡʌnaɪt/); Sigma Canis Majoris is its Bayer designation. This star is located at a distance of approximately 1,290 light-years (400 parsecs) from the Sun. It has an apparent visual magnitude varying between 3.43 and 3.51, which is bright enough to be seen with the naked eye. The star is drifting further away with a line of sight velocity of +22 km/s.

== Nomenclature ==
σ Canis Majoris (Latinised to Sigma Canis Majoris, abbreviated Sigma CMa, σ CMa) is the system's Bayer designation.

The star is identified with the nganurganity [ˈŋanuɾˌɡ̊aniɟ̊] "Jacky lizard" in the culture of the Boorong, a clan of the indigenous Maligundidj people of northwestern Victoria in Australia, who saw it as an ancestral figure who fights the Moon, flanked by his wives (the stars Delta and Epsilon Canis Majoris). The name was transcribed by settler William Stanbridge as "Unurgunite" in the 1850s. (Initial ng-, which does not occur in English, was typically ignored in transcription of that era.)

In 2016, the International Astronomical Union organized a Working Group on Star Names (WGSN) to catalog and standardize proper names for stars. The WGSN approved the name Unurgunite for σ Canis Majoris on 5 September 2017 and it is now so included in the List of IAU-approved Star Names. The spelling was later corrected to "Nganurganity". (Other historical corruptions of star names, such as Betelgeuse, are accepted as correct forms.)

== Properties ==
Sigma Canis Majoris is a supergiant star with a stellar classification of K5 Ib. This is a type of star that is in the late stages of its evolution, having consumed the hydrogen at its core and ballooned out to 290 times the Sun's radius. At 1.38 astronomical units, this radius is 38% larger than the average distance of the Earth from the Sun. It is currently radiating more than 15,800 times the luminosity of the Sun from its outer envelope at an effective temperature of around 3,800 K. This temperature gives it the cool orange-red hue of a late K-type star.

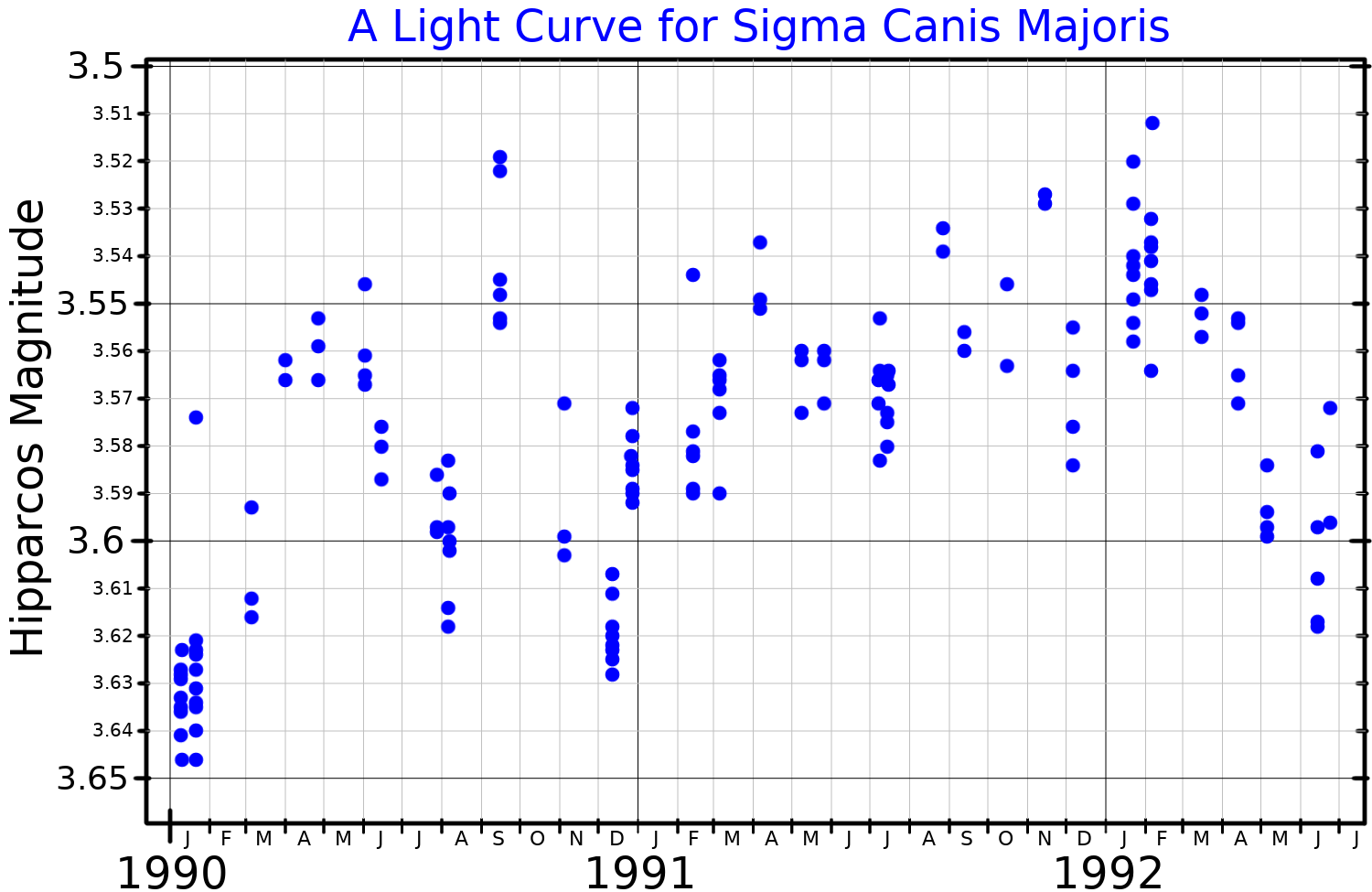
A light curve for Sigma Canis Majoris, plotted from Hipparcos data

Sigma Canis Majoris was noted as a likely variable star in a list of bright southern stars studied at the Cape Observatory. The variability was confirmed in 1963, and it was formally catalogued as a variable star. It is classified as an irregular variable star and its brightness varies from magnitude +3.43 to +3.51. The magnetic field of this star has a strength below 1 G. It is suspected of being a member of the Collinder 121 stellar association of co-moving stars, but this is disputed.

Sigma Canis Majoris is listed as a potential type II supernova progenitor. Instruments are capable of measuring the pre-supernova neutrino flux that could act as an alert that the supernova explosion was starting.
