= Collinder 121 =

Open cluster

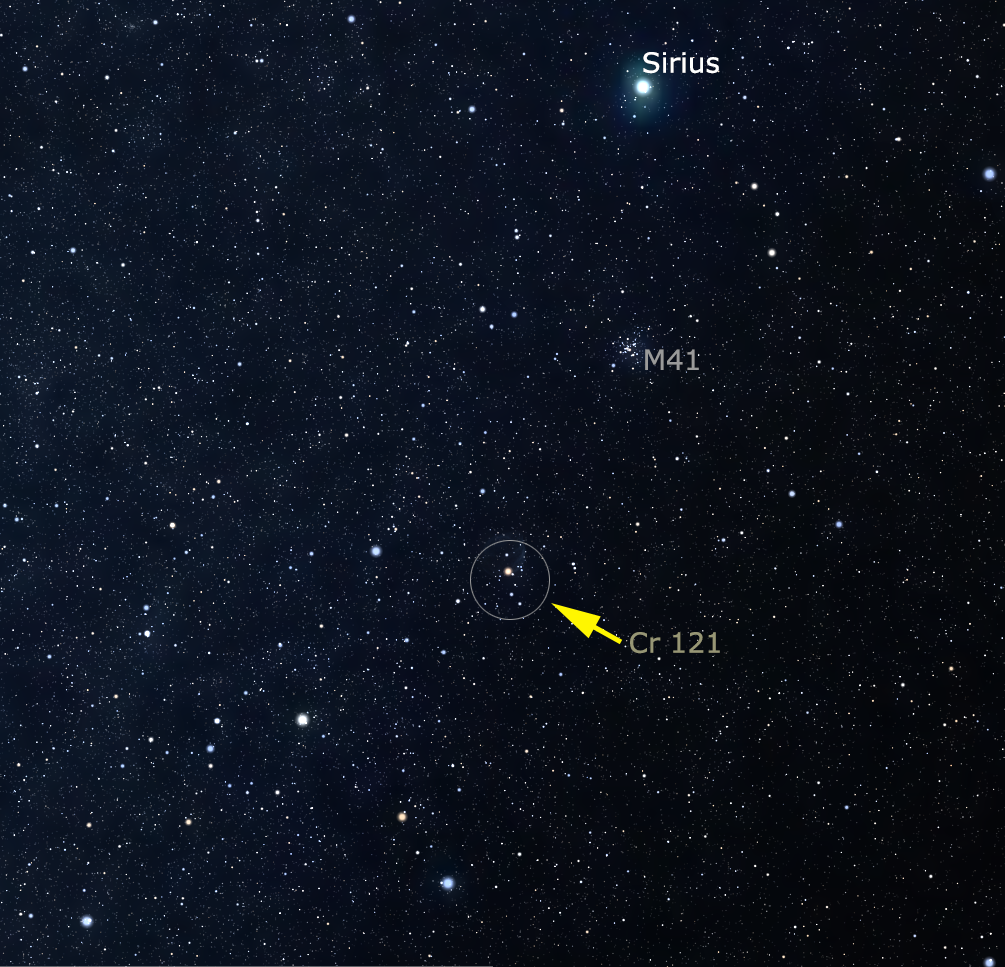
- Location of Cr 121 in Canis Major

Observation data (J2000 epoch)
- Right ascension: 06^{h} 56^{m} 20.0^{s}
- Declination: −24° 43′ 48″
- Distance: 3.59 ± 0.72 kly (1.10 ± 0.22 kpc)
- Apparent magnitude (V): 2.6
- Apparent dimensions (V): 50′

Physical characteristics
- Estimated age: 12.0 Myr
- Other designations: Cr 121, OCl 619.0

Associations
- Constellation: Canis Major

Collinder 121 (Cr 121) is a loose open cluster/stellar association of stars in the constellation Canis Major, the "greater dog". It is located at a distance of 3,590 ± 720 ly (1.10 ± 0.22 kpc) from the Sun. This cluster was catalogued by Swedish astronomer Per Collinder in 1931 as entry 121 in his paper titled, On structural properties of open galactic clusters and their spatial distribution. During his study, he found 18–20 stars within an angular area of 60′ × 40′. Of these, eight are members of the Henry Draper Catalog. About 2° to the north is the large cluster NGC 2287 (M 41).

In 1958, it was noted by M. S. Roberts that the Wolf-Rayet star WR 6 (or EZ CMa) coincides with this cluster, sparking interest in its study. The red supergiant Omicron^{1} Canis Majoris is strongly associated with this cluster. Several bright B-type stars with similar space motions are positioned near this supergiant, presumably forming the core of the association. In 1967, the membership list was extended by 28 stars within a 10° radius. O. J. Eggen in 1981 suggested that Cr121 is linked to an OB association of stars 10° to the north, known as CMa OB1.

The results from the Hipparcos satellite drastically changed the membership list, finding 105 stars that formed an OB association rather than a compact cluster. However, a 2003 study of lower mass stars in the vicinity lent weight to the original cluster proposal. Instead, this cluster is believed to be coincident with a foreground association designated CMa OB2. As of 2023, data from the Gaia space observatory shows a major association of OB stars is centered at a distance of 803 pc. Thus, Cr 121 and CMa OB2 may be the same extended cluster.

EZ Canis Majoris may be a former member and is now a runaway star.

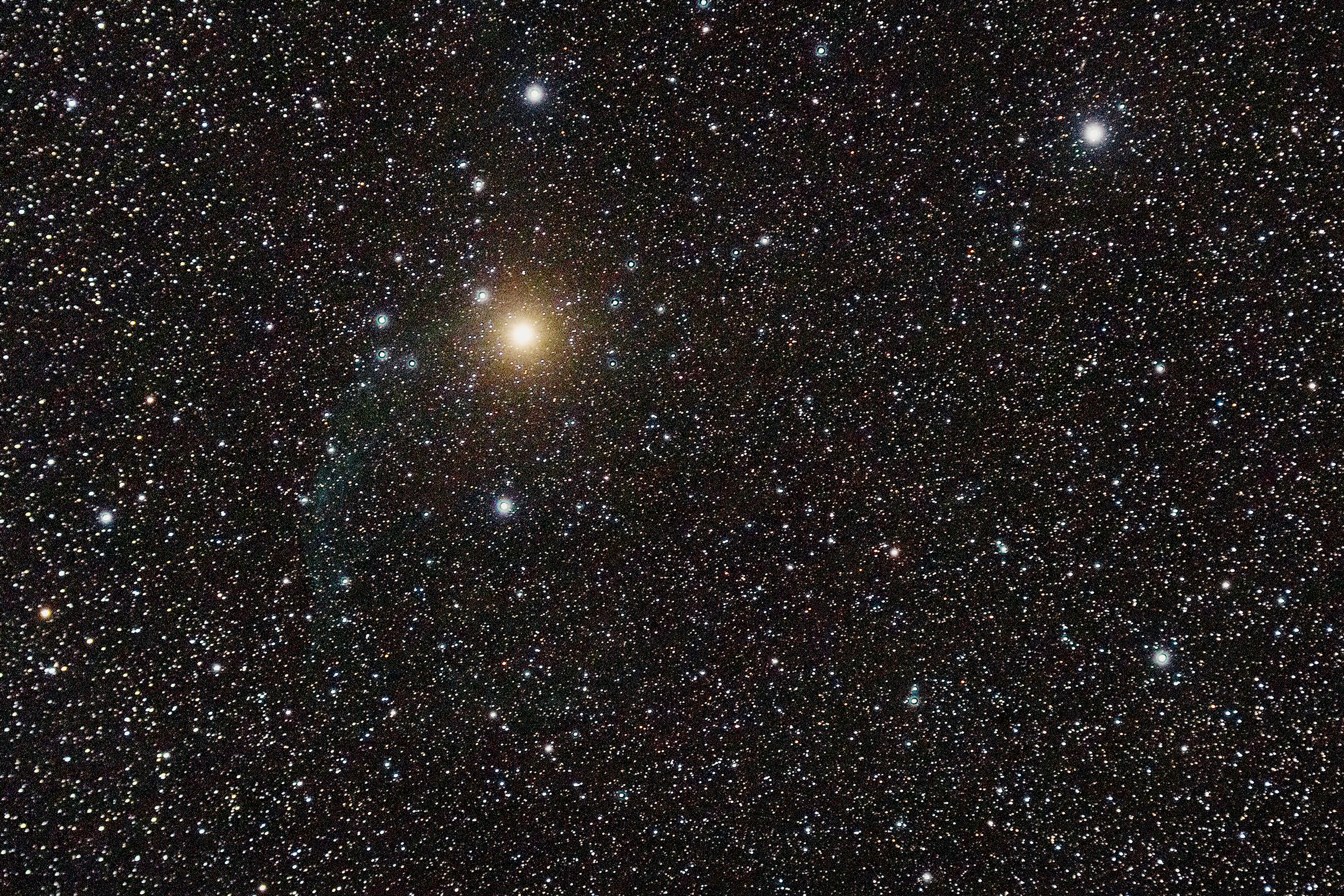
A view of the cluster with south up. The brightest star is Omicron^{1} Canis Majoris; EZ Canis Majoris is below it.

== See also ==
- Sigma Canis Majoris – a disputed member
