= Omicron1 Canis Majoris =

Variable star in the constellation Canis Major

ο^{1} Canis Majoris
- Location of ο^{1} CMa (circled)

Observation data Epoch J2000 Equinox ICRS
- Constellation: Canis Major
- Right ascension: 06^{h} 54^{m} 07.9523^{s}
- Declination: −24° 11′ 03.160″
- Apparent magnitude (V): 3.87 (3.78 to 3.99)

Characteristics
- Evolutionary stage: Red supergiant
- Spectral type: K2.5 Iab
- U−B color index: +1.99
- B−V color index: +1.73
- Variable type: Slow irregular variable (Lc)

Astrometry
Radial velocity (R_{v})	+36.3 km/s
Proper motion (μ)	RA: −3.771 mas/yr Dec.: 4.503 mas/yr
Parallax (π)	1.2869±0.1209 mas
Distance	2,673±241 ly (820±74 pc)
Absolute magnitude (M_{V})	−4.69

Details
Mass	7.83±2.0 M_{☉} 14.38±2.88 M_{☉} 18 M_{☉}
Radius	390 R_{☉}
Luminosity	37,414 L_{☉}
Temperature	4,015 K
Metallicity [Fe/H]	−0.11 dex
Rotational velocity (v sin i)	12.31 km/s
Age	18 Myr

Other designations
- 16 Canis Majoris, CD−24°4567, GC 9059, HD 50877, HIP 33152, HR 2580, SAO 172542

Database references
SIMBAD	data

Omicron^{1} Canis Majoris is a red supergiant star in the constellation Canis Major. Its name is a Bayer designation that is Latinized from ο^{1} Canis Majoris, and abbreviated Omicron^{1} CMa or ο^{1} CMa. This is a variable star that ranges in apparent visual magnitude from 3.78 to 3.99, which is bright enough to be viewed with the naked eye. It is located at a distance of approximately 2,700 light years, and is drifting further away with a line of sight velocity of +36 km/s.

== Name ==
Johann Bayer gave two adjacent stars the Bayer designation of ο Canis Majoris in 1603, but without distinguishing between the stars. John Flamsteed gave the two omicron stars his own numbered designations of 16 and 24 Canis Majoris in the early 18th century. Friedrich Wilhelm Argelander labelled the stars as ο^{1} and ο^{2} in his atlas Uranometria Nova. Nicolas Louis de Lacaille labelled it c Canis Majoris, but this was not upheld by subsequent cartographers. Its Henry Draper Catalogue designation is HD 50877. The two Omicron stars marked the centre of the Great Dog's body on Bayer's 1603 Uranometria.

== Distance ==
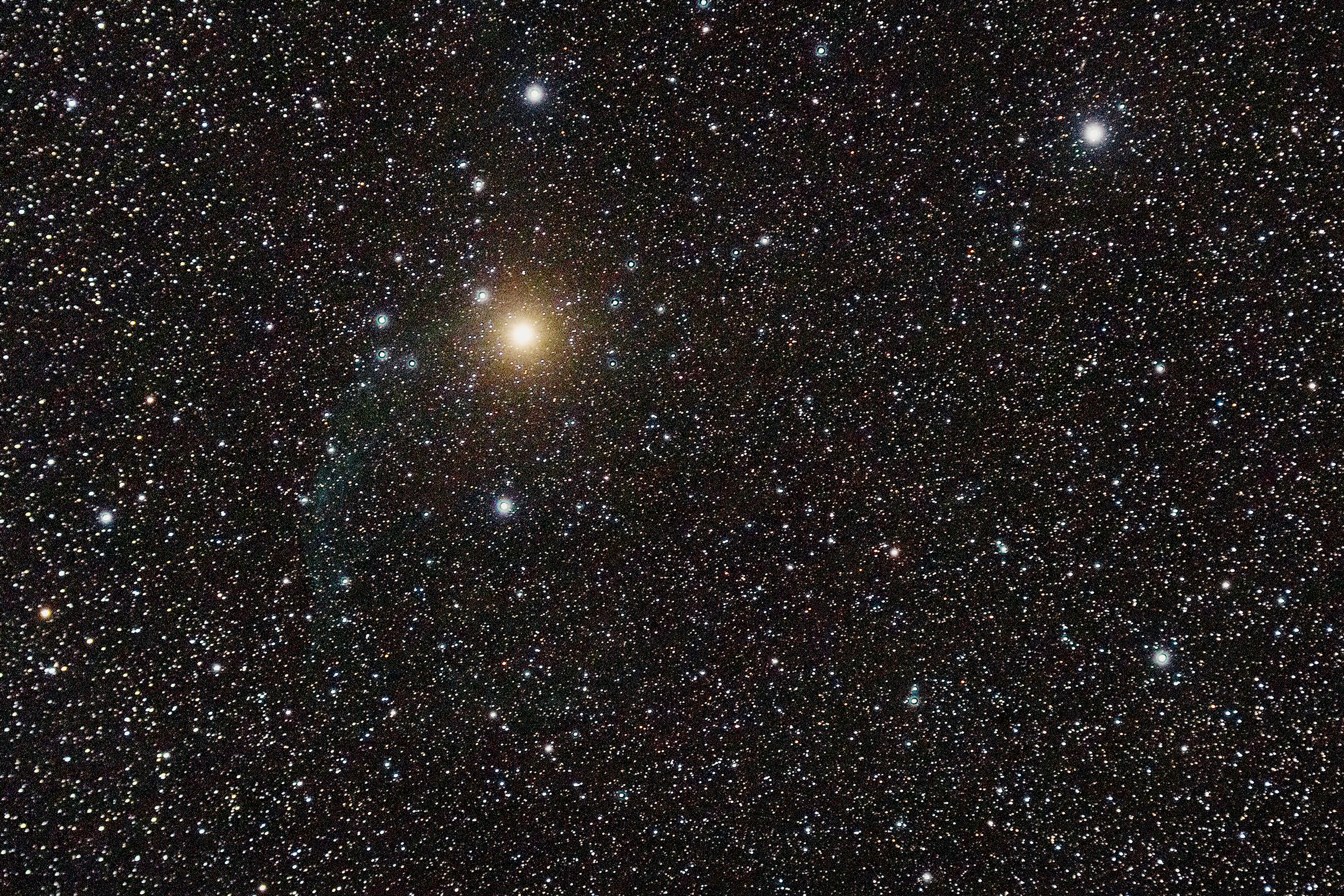
Omicron^{1} Canis Majoris is the brightest star in this image; EZ Canis Majoris is below it (south is up)

The distance to ο^{1} Canis Majoris is uncertain. It is strongly associated with the Collinder 121 stellar association, located around 3,500 light years (1,085 parsecs) distant. Its original Hipparcos parallax placed it at 610 pc, similar to the distance of EZ Canis Majoris, another member of Cr 121. ο^{1} CMa appears to be interacting with the nebula around EZ CMa, implying the two are at the same distance. However, the revised Hipparcos parallax is only 0.22 mas, with a large margin of error of 0.43 mas, so the distance is not well-defined but likely to be large. The distance to EZ CMa is now thought to be around 1,500 pc. Conversely, though only separated by 2 degrees from the blue supergiant ο^{2} Canis Majoris, the two appear to be unrelated.

Bailer-Jones et al. (2021) estimate a distance of 820 parsecs, give or take 74 parsecs to Omicron^{1} Canis Majoris, using a method that use its parallax from Gaia EDR3, its color and apparent magnitude.

== Description ==
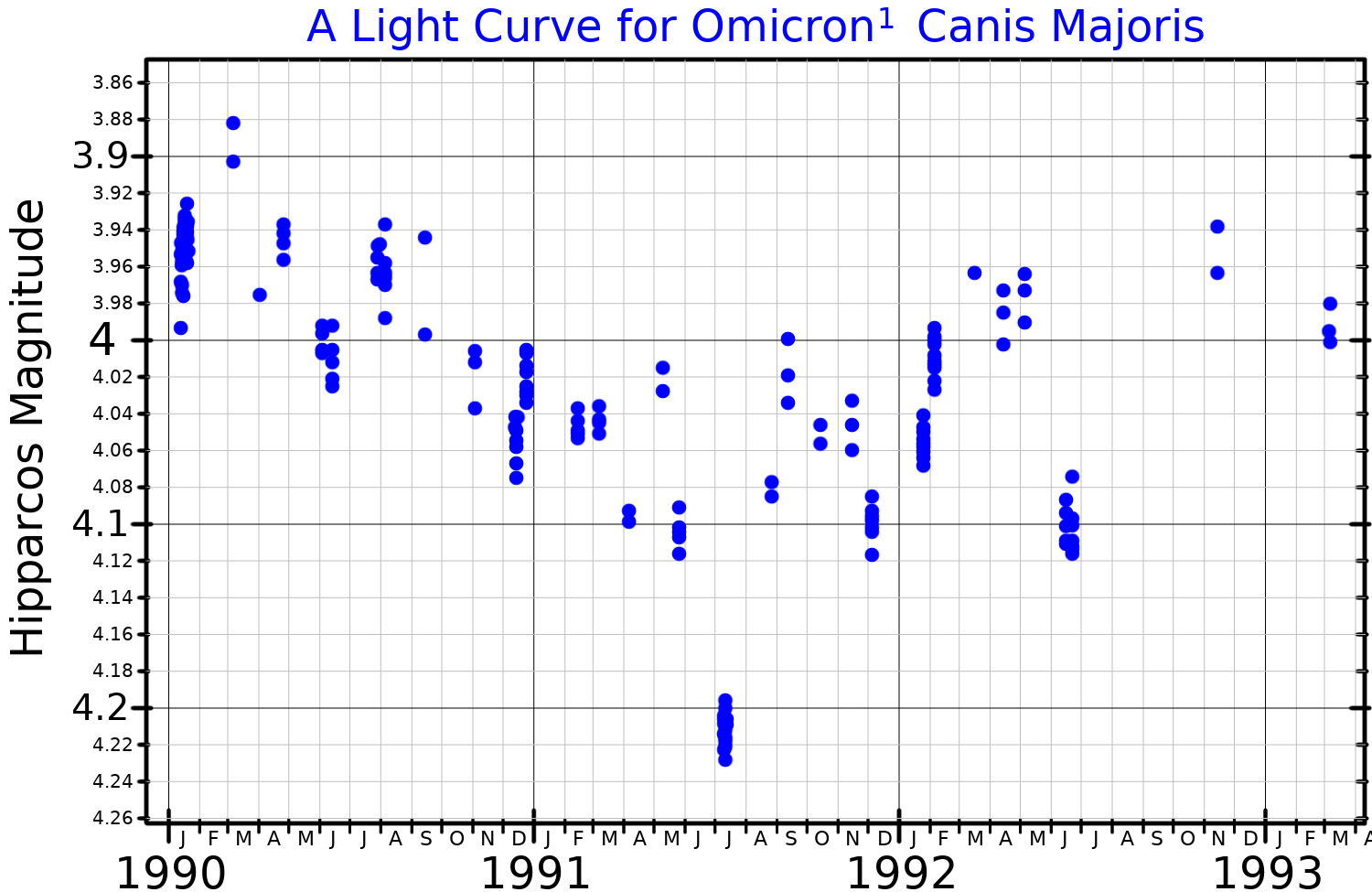
A light curve for Omicron^{1} Canis Majoris, plotted from Hipparcos data

The star itself is an orange K-type supergiant of spectral type K2.5 Iab and is an irregular variable star, varying between apparent magnitudes 3.78 and 3.99. A cool star, its surface temperature is around 4,000 K. Around 8 times as massive as the Sun with around 390 times its diameter, it shines with 37,000 times its luminosity. Interstellar dust only obscures it slightly, and its apparent magnitude is 0.16 fainter than it would be if unobscured. Thought to be around 18 million years old, ο^{1} Canis Majoris is undergoing nuclear fusion of helium in its core to generate energy and will one day explode as a type II supernova.
