= Sh 2-308 =

Emission nebula or WR* in Canis major

Emission nebula

Observation data: J2000.0 epoch
- Class: 3 2 2
- Right ascension: 06^{h} 54^{m} 13^{s}
- Declination: −23° 55′ 42″
- Distance: 4530 ly
- Apparent magnitude (V): 7.0
- Apparent dimensions (V): 35′ × 35′
- Constellation: Canis Major

Physical characteristics
- Radius: 30 ly
- Designations: Sh-308, RCW 11, LBN 1052

Sh 2-308, also designated as Sharpless 308, RCW 11, or LBN 1052, and commonly known as the Dolphin-Head Nebula, is an H II region located near the center of the constellation Canis Major, composed of ionised hydrogen. It is about 8 degrees south of Sirius, the brightest star in the night sky. The nebula is bubble-like and surrounds a Wolf–Rayet star named EZ Canis Majoris. This star is in the brief, pre-supernova phase of its stellar evolution. The nebula is about 4,530 light-years (1,389 parsecs) away from Earth, but some sources indicate that both the star and the nebula are up to 5,870 ly (1,800 pc) away. Yet others indicate the nebula is as close as 1,875 ly (575 pc) from Earth.

== Central star ==
Sh 2-308 surrounds the Wolf–Rayet star EZ Canis Majoris, also designated EZ CMa or WR 6. Its apparent magnitude varies from 6.71 to 6.95. Its spectral type indicates that the star is very hot and luminous. The spectrum shows that it is devoid of hydrogen at the surface. EZ Canis Majoris is expected eventually to explode in a supernova, therefore subsuming the nebula.

== Formation ==
The nebula was formed about 70,000 years ago by the star EZ Canis Majoris throwing off its outer hydrogen layers, revealing inner layers of heavier elements. Fast stellar winds, blowing at 1,700 km/s (3.8 million mph) from this star, create the bubble-shaped nebula as they sweep up slower moving material from an earlier phase of the star's evolution. The hydrogen composing the nebula is ionised by intense ultraviolet radiation. The nebula is approximately 60 light-years across at its widest point.

== Observation ==
The most favorable period for observing the nebula in the night sky is between the months of December and April. Its southern declination makes it easier to observe from the Southern Hemisphere, though it is easily visible from most of the Northern Hemisphere as well. It appears as a faint cloud in photographs taken with high-power amateur instruments, with the help of special filters.

== Gallery ==
Dolphin Head Nebula – SH 2-308. Take and Processed by Luis "Maxx" Marín

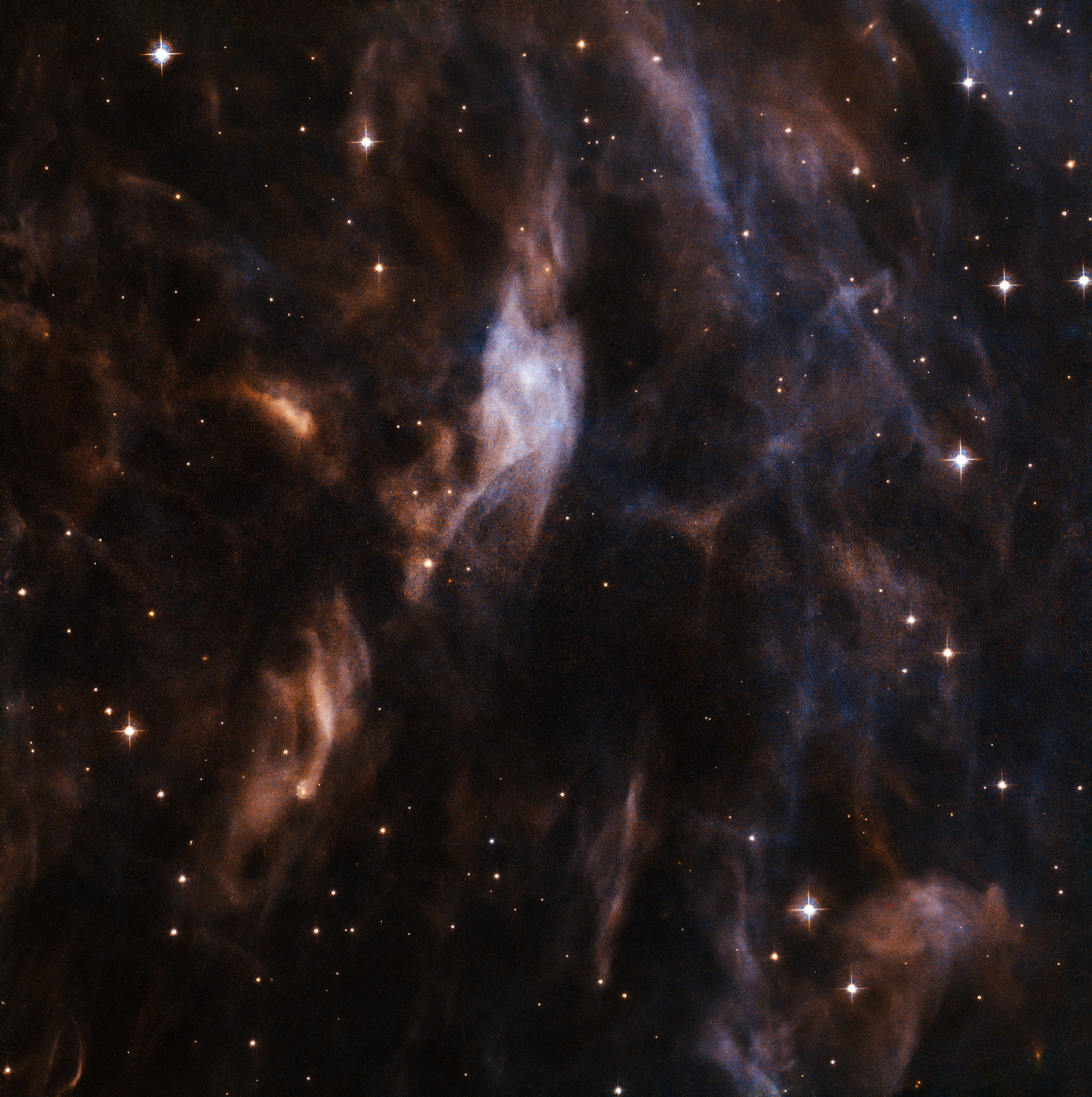
A portion of Sh 2-308 to the west of EZ Canis Majoris

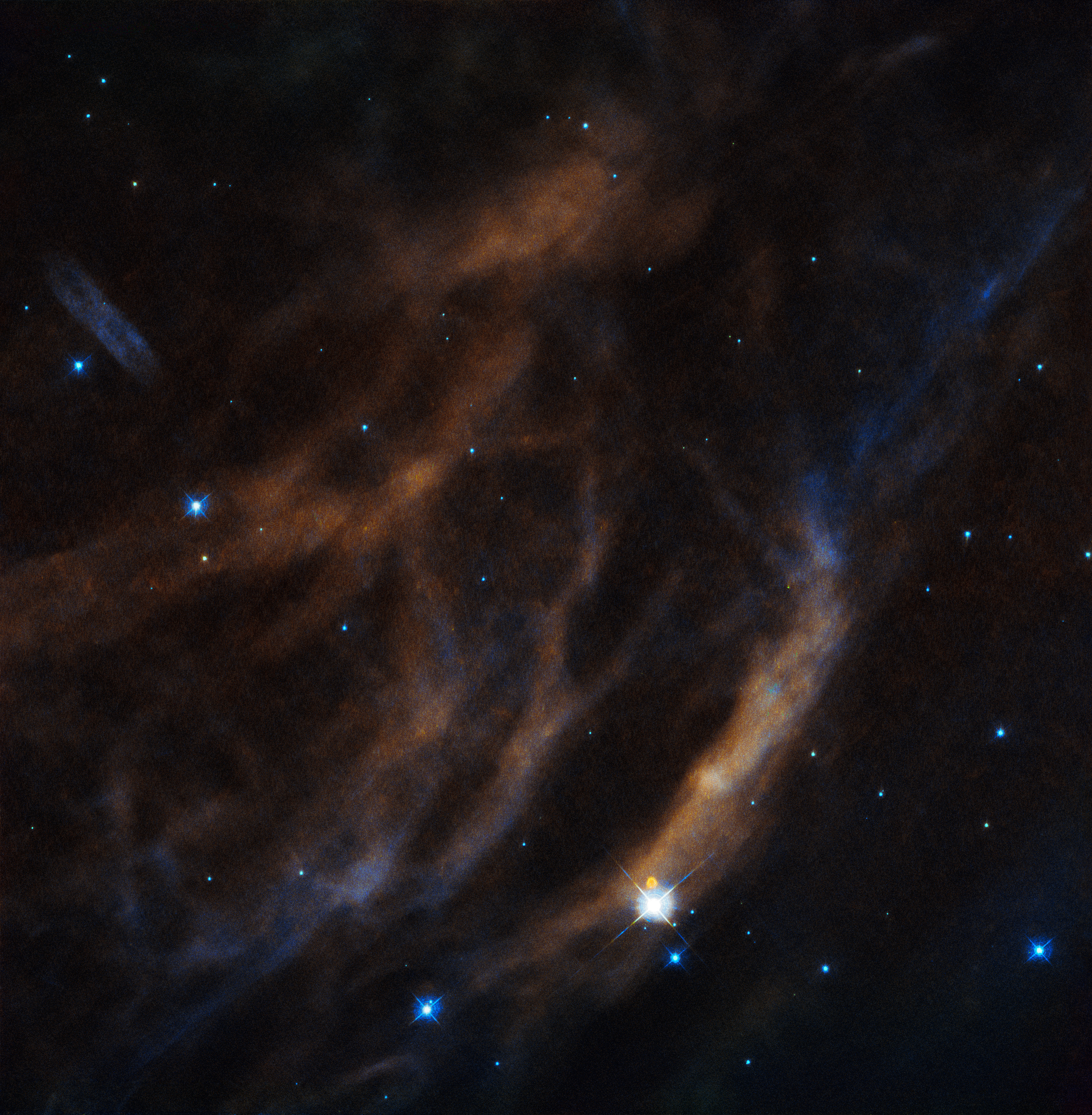
A small portion of Sh 2-308 imaged by the Hubble Space Telescope (up is north-west)

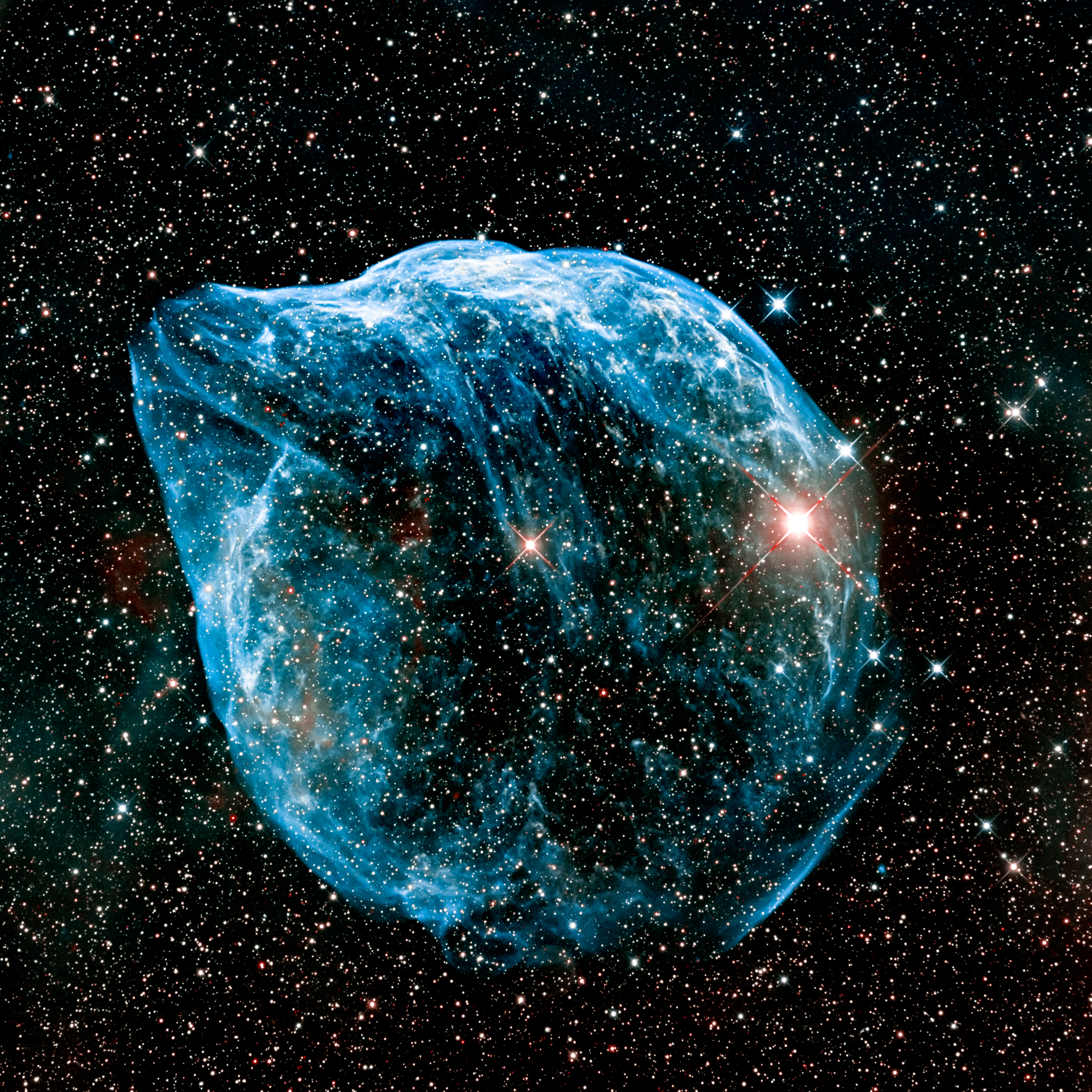
Dolphin Head Nebula – SH 2-308. Processed by Jim DeLillo via TelescopeLive One-Click Imaging

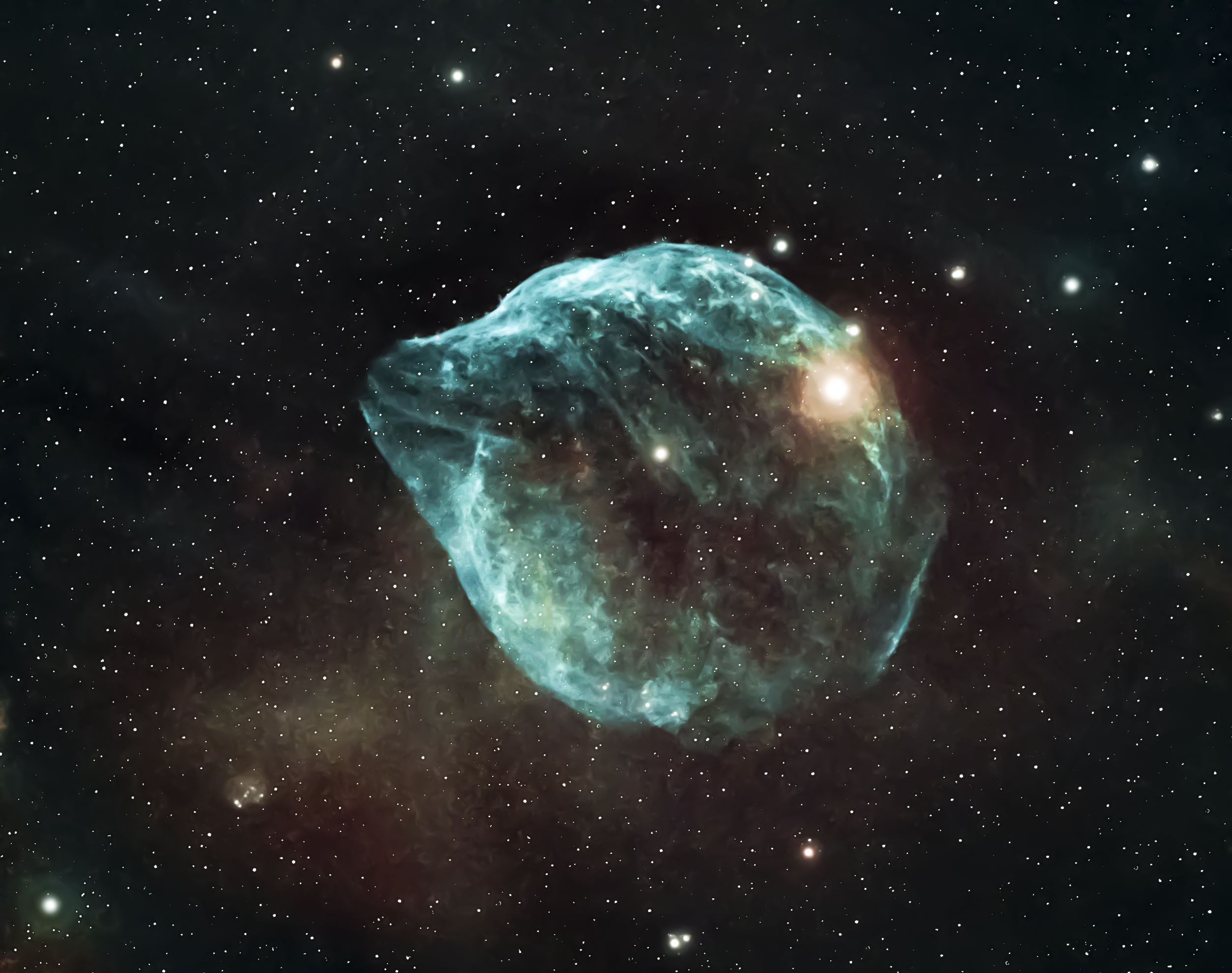

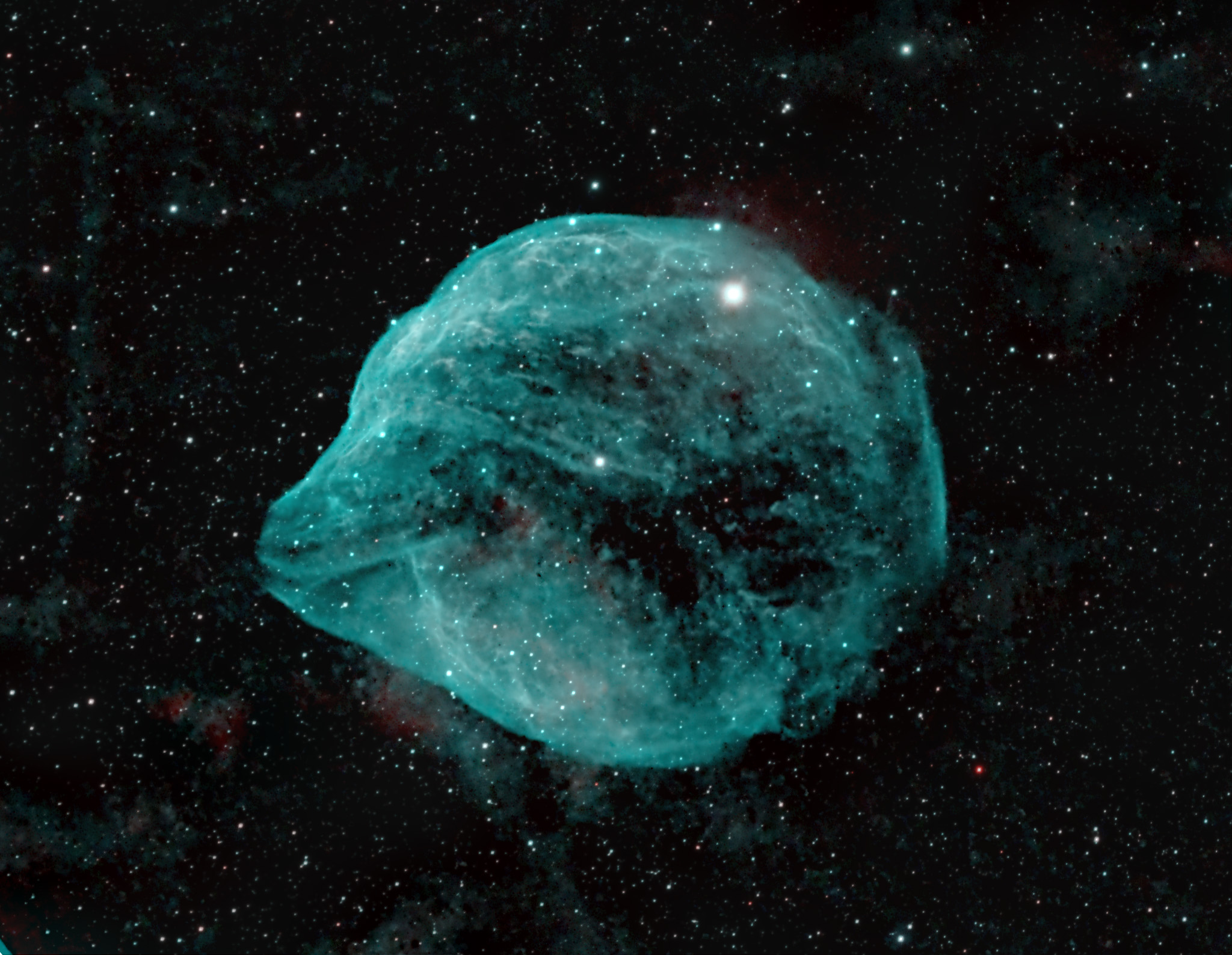

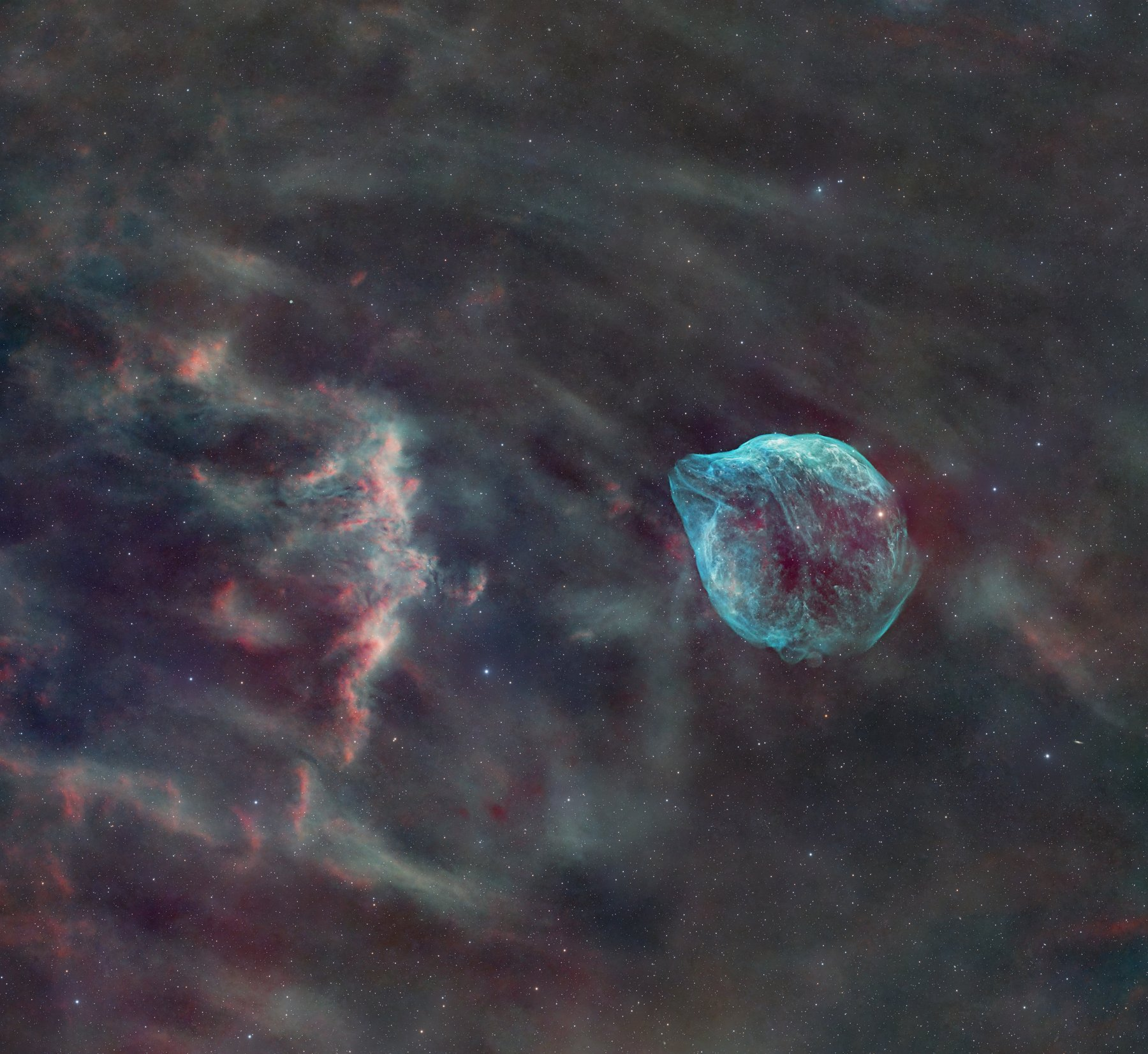
Dolphin Head Nebula and his companion hydrogen cloud.
