= Puppis in Chinese astronomy =

According to traditional Chinese uranography, the modern constellation Puppis is located within the southern quadrant of the sky, which is symbolized as the Vermilion Bird of the South (南方朱雀, Nán Fāng Zhū Què).

The name of the western constellation in modern Chinese is 船尾座 (chuán wěi zuò), meaning "behind of the ship constellation".

== Stars ==
The map of Chinese constellation in constellation Puppis area consists of:

Four Symbols	Mansion (Chinese name)	Romanization	Translation	Asterisms (Chinese name)	Romanization	Translation	Western star name	Proper Name	Chinese star name	Romanization	Translation
Vermilion Bird of the South (南方朱雀)	井	Jǐng	Well	弧矢	Húshǐ	Bow and Arrow					
Vermilion Bird of the South (南方朱雀)	井	Jǐng	Well	弧矢	Húshǐ	Bow and Arrow	HD 63032		弧矢三	Húshǐsān	3rd star
Vermilion Bird of the South (南方朱雀)	井	Jǐng	Well	弧矢	Húshǐ	Bow and Arrow	χ Pup		弧矢四	Húshǐsì	4th star
Vermilion Bird of the South (南方朱雀)	井	Jǐng	Well	弧矢	Húshǐ	Bow and Arrow	ο Pup		弧矢五	Húshǐwu	5th star
Vermilion Bird of the South (南方朱雀)	井	Jǐng	Well	弧矢	Húshǐ	Bow and Arrow	k^{1} Pup and k^{2} Pup		弧矢六	Húshǐliù	6th star
Vermilion Bird of the South (南方朱雀)	井	Jǐng	Well	弧矢	Húshǐ	Bow and Arrow	π Pup				
Vermilion Bird of the South (南方朱雀)	井	Jǐng	Well	弧矢	Húshǐ	Bow and Arrow	π Pup		弧矢九	Húshǐjiǔ	9th star
Vermilion Bird of the South (南方朱雀)	井	Jǐng	Well	弧矢	Húshǐ	Bow and Arrow	π Pup		天节北星	Tiānjiéběixīng	Star in the north of Celestial Tally constellation
Vermilion Bird of the South (南方朱雀)	井	Jǐng	Well	弧矢	Húshǐ	Bow and Arrow	2 Pup		弧矢增八	Húshǐzēngbā	8th additional star
Vermilion Bird of the South (南方朱雀)	井	Jǐng	Well	弧矢	Húshǐ	Bow and Arrow	4 Pup		弧矢增九	Húshǐzēngjiǔ	9th additional star
Vermilion Bird of the South (南方朱雀)	井	Jǐng	Well	弧矢	Húshǐ	Bow and Arrow	5 Pup		弧矢增十	Húshǐzēngshí	10th additional star
Vermilion Bird of the South (南方朱雀)	井	Jǐng	Well	弧矢	Húshǐ	Bow and Arrow	10 Pup		弧矢增十一	Húshǐzēngshíyī	11th additional star
Vermilion Bird of the South (南方朱雀)	井	Jǐng	Well	弧矢	Húshǐ	Bow and Arrow	6 Pup		弧矢增十二	Húshǐzēngshíèr	12th additional star
Vermilion Bird of the South (南方朱雀)	井	Jǐng	Well	弧矢	Húshǐ	Bow and Arrow	16 Pup		弧矢增十三	Húshǐzēngshísān	13th additional star
Vermilion Bird of the South (南方朱雀)	井	Jǐng	Well	弧矢	Húshǐ	Bow and Arrow	14 Pup		弧矢增十四	Húshǐzēngshísì	14th additional star
Vermilion Bird of the South (南方朱雀)	井	Jǐng	Well	弧矢	Húshǐ	Bow and Arrow	11 Pup		弧矢增十五	Húshǐzēngshíwǔ	15th additional star
Vermilion Bird of the South (南方朱雀)	井	Jǐng	Well	弧矢	Húshǐ	Bow and Arrow	12 Pup		弧矢增十六	Húshǐzēngshíliù	16th additional star
Vermilion Bird of the South (南方朱雀)	井	Jǐng	Well	弧矢	Húshǐ	Bow and Arrow	ξ Pup	Azmidi (for component Aa)	弧矢增十七	Húshǐzēngshíqī	17th additional star
Vermilion Bird of the South (南方朱雀)	井	Jǐng	Well	弧矢	Húshǐ	Bow and Arrow	HD 62412		弧矢增十八	Húshǐzēngshíbā	18th additional star
Vermilion Bird of the South (南方朱雀)	井	Jǐng	Well	弧矢	Húshǐ	Bow and Arrow	3 Pup		弧矢增十九	Húshǐzēngshíjiǔ	19th additional star
Vermilion Bird of the South (南方朱雀)	井	Jǐng	Well	弧矢	Húshǐ	Bow and Arrow	HD 61831		弧矢增二十	Húshǐzēngèrshí	20th additional star
Vermilion Bird of the South (南方朱雀)	井	Jǐng	Well	弧矢	Húshǐ	Bow and Arrow	QZ Pup		弧矢增二十一	Húshǐzēngèrshíyī	21st additional star
Vermilion Bird of the South (南方朱雀)	井	Jǐng	Well	弧矢	Húshǐ	Bow and Arrow	ζ Pup	Naos	弧矢增二十二	Húshǐzēngèrshíèr	22nd additional star
Vermilion Bird of the South (南方朱雀)	井	Jǐng	Well	弧矢	Húshǐ	Bow and Arrow	HD 64440		弧矢增二十三	Húshǐzēngèrshísān	23rd additional star
Vermilion Bird of the South (南方朱雀)	井	Jǐng	Well	弧矢	Húshǐ	Bow and Arrow	σ Pup		弧矢增二十四	Húshǐzēngèrshísì	24th additional star
Vermilion Bird of the South (南方朱雀)	井	Jǐng	Well	弧矢	Húshǐ	Bow and Arrow	HD 60666		弧矢增二十七	Húshǐzēngèrshíqī	27th additional star
Vermilion Bird of the South (南方朱雀)	井	Jǐng	Well	弧矢	Húshǐ	Bow and Arrow	HD 60686		弧矢增二十八	Húshǐzēngèrshíbā	28th additional star
Vermilion Bird of the South (南方朱雀)	井	Jǐng	Well	弧矢	Húshǐ	Bow and Arrow	HD 63112		弧矢增二十九	Húshǐzēngèrshíjiǔ	29th additional star
Vermilion Bird of the South (南方朱雀)	井	Jǐng	Well	弧矢	Húshǐ	Bow and Arrow	HD 63215		弧矢增三十	Húshǐzēngsānshí	30th additional star
Vermilion Bird of the South (南方朱雀)	井	Jǐng	Well	弧矢	Húshǐ	Bow and Arrow	12 Pup		弧矢增三十一	Húshǐzēngsānshíyī	31st additional star
Vermilion Bird of the South (南方朱雀)	井	Jǐng	Well	弧矢	Húshǐ	Bow and Arrow	ρ Pup	Tureis	弧矢增三十二	Húshǐzēngsānshíèr	32nd additional star
Vermilion Bird of the South (南方朱雀)	井	Jǐng	Well	老人	Lǎorén	Old Man					
Vermilion Bird of the South (南方朱雀)	井	Jǐng	Well	老人	Lǎorén	Old Man	τ Pup		老人增一	Lǎorénzēngyī	1st additional star
Vermilion Bird of the South (南方朱雀)	井	Jǐng	Well	老人	Lǎorén	Old Man	ν Pup	Pipit	老人增二	Lǎorénzēngèr	2nd additional star
Vermilion Bird of the South (南方朱雀)	鬼	Guǐ	Ghost	外廚	Wàichú	Outer Kitchen					
Vermilion Bird of the South (南方朱雀)	鬼	Guǐ	Ghost	外廚	Wàichú	Outer Kitchen	21 Pup		外廚增十一	Wàichúzēngshíyī	11th additional star
Vermilion Bird of the South (南方朱雀)	鬼	Guǐ	Ghost	外廚	Wàichú	Outer Kitchen	19 Pup		外廚增十二	Wàichúzēngshíèr	12th additional star
Vermilion Bird of the South (南方朱雀)	鬼	Guǐ	Ghost	外廚	Wàichú	Outer Kitchen	20 Pup		外廚增十三	Wàichúzēngshísān	13th additional star
Vermilion Bird of the South (南方朱雀)	鬼	Guǐ	Ghost	外廚	Wàichú	Outer Kitchen	18 Pup		外廚增十四	Wàichúzēngshísì	14th additional star
Vermilion Bird of the South (南方朱雀)	鬼	Guǐ	Ghost	外廚	Wàichú	Outer Kitchen	22 Pup		外廚增十七	Wàichúzēngshíqī	17th additional star

== See also ==
- Chinese astronomy
- Traditional Chinese star names
- Chinese constellations
