= Canis Major in Chinese astronomy =

According to traditional Chinese uranography, the modern constellation Canis Major is located within the southern quadrant of the sky, which is symbolized as the Vermilion Bird of the South (南方朱雀, Nán Fāng Zhū Què).

The name of the western constellation in modern Chinese is 大犬座 (dà quǎn zuò), meaning "the giant dog constellation".

== Stars ==
Four Symbols	Mansion (Chinese name)	Romanization	Translation	Asterisms (Chinese name)	Romanization	Translation	Western star name	Proper Name	Chinese star name	Romanization	Translation
Vermilion Bird of the South (南方朱雀)	井	Jǐng	Well	軍市	Jūnshì	Market for Soldiers					
Vermilion Bird of the South (南方朱雀)	井	Jǐng	Well	軍市	Jūnshì	Market for Soldiers	β CMa	Mirzam	軍市一	Jūnshìyī	1st star
Vermilion Bird of the South (南方朱雀)	井	Jǐng	Well	軍市	Jūnshì	Market for Soldiers	ν^{3} CMa		軍市二	Jūnshìèr	2nd star
Vermilion Bird of the South (南方朱雀)	井	Jǐng	Well	軍市	Jūnshì	Market for Soldiers	15 CMa		軍市三	Jūnshìsān	3rd star
Vermilion Bird of the South (南方朱雀)	井	Jǐng	Well	軍市	Jūnshì	Market for Soldiers	π CMa		軍市四	Jūnshìsì	4th star
Vermilion Bird of the South (南方朱雀)	井	Jǐng	Well	軍市	Jūnshì	Market for Soldiers	ο^{1} CMa		軍市五	Jūnshìwu	5th star
Vermilion Bird of the South (南方朱雀)	井	Jǐng	Well	軍市	Jūnshì	Market for Soldiers	ξ^{1} CMa		軍市六	Jūnshìliù	6th star
Vermilion Bird of the South (南方朱雀)	井	Jǐng	Well	軍市	Jūnshì	Market for Soldiers	ν^{1} CMa		軍市增一	Jūnshìzēngyī	1st additional star
Vermilion Bird of the South (南方朱雀)	井	Jǐng	Well	軍市	Jūnshì	Market for Soldiers	ξ^{2} CMa		軍市增二	Jūnshìzēngèr	2nd additional star
Vermilion Bird of the South (南方朱雀)	井	Jǐng	Well	軍市	Jūnshì	Market for Soldiers	12 CMa		軍市增三	Jūnshìzēngsān	3rd additional star
Vermilion Bird of the South (南方朱雀)	井	Jǐng	Well	軍市	Jūnshì	Market for Soldiers	ο^{2} CMa		軍市增五	Jūnshìzēngwǔ	5th additional star
Vermilion Bird of the South (南方朱雀)	井	Jǐng	Well	野雞	Yějī	Wild Cockerel	ν^{2} CMa		野雞	Yějī	(One star of)
Vermilion Bird of the South (南方朱雀)	井	Jǐng	Well	孫	Sūn	Grandson					
Vermilion Bird of the South (南方朱雀)	井	Jǐng	Well	孫	Sūn	Grandson	ζ CMa	Furud	孫增一	Sūnzēngyī	1st additional star
Vermilion Bird of the South (南方朱雀)	井	Jǐng	Well	孫	Sūn	Grandson	λ CMa		孫增二	Sūnzēngèr	2nd additional star
Vermilion Bird of the South (南方朱雀)	井	Jǐng	Well	天狼	Tiānláng	Celestial Wolf					
Vermilion Bird of the South (南方朱雀)	井	Jǐng	Well	天狼	Tiānláng	Celestial Wolf	α CMa	Sirius			
Vermilion Bird of the South (南方朱雀)	井	Jǐng	Well	天狼	Tiānláng	Celestial Wolf	α CMa	Sirius	天狼	Tiānláng	(One star of)
Vermilion Bird of the South (南方朱雀)	井	Jǐng	Well	天狼	Tiānláng	Celestial Wolf	α CMa	Sirius	狼星	Lángxīng	Wolf star
Vermilion Bird of the South (南方朱雀)	井	Jǐng	Well	天狼	Tiānláng	Celestial Wolf	α CMa	Sirius	天狼星	Tiānlángxīng	Star of Celestial Wolf
Vermilion Bird of the South (南方朱雀)	井	Jǐng	Well	天狼	Tiānláng	Celestial Wolf	α CMa	Sirius	賊星	Zéixīng	Thief star, the meteor
Vermilion Bird of the South (南方朱雀)	井	Jǐng	Well	天狼	Tiānláng	Celestial Wolf	11 CMa		天狼增一	Tiānlángzēngyī	1st additional star
Vermilion Bird of the South (南方朱雀)	井	Jǐng	Well	天狼	Tiānláng	Celestial Wolf	θ CMa		天狼增二	Tiānlángzēngèr	2nd additional star
Vermilion Bird of the South (南方朱雀)	井	Jǐng	Well	天狼	Tiānláng	Celestial Wolf	μ CMa		天狼增三	Tiānlángzēngsān	3rd additional star
Vermilion Bird of the South (南方朱雀)	井	Jǐng	Well	天狼	Tiānláng	Celestial Wolf	γ CMa	Muliphein	天狼增四	Tiānlángzēngsì	4th additional star
Vermilion Bird of the South (南方朱雀)	井	Jǐng	Well	天狼	Tiānláng	Celestial Wolf	ι CMa		天狼增五	Tiānlángzēngwǔ	5th additional star
Vermilion Bird of the South (南方朱雀)	井	Jǐng	Well	弧矢	Húshǐ	Bow and Arrow					
Vermilion Bird of the South (南方朱雀)	井	Jǐng	Well	弧矢	Húshǐ	Bow and Arrow	δ CMa	Wezen			
Vermilion Bird of the South (南方朱雀)	井	Jǐng	Well	弧矢	Húshǐ	Bow and Arrow	δ CMa	Wezen	弧矢一	Húshǐyī	1st star
Vermilion Bird of the South (南方朱雀)	井	Jǐng	Well	弧矢	Húshǐ	Bow and Arrow	δ CMa	Wezen	矢中星	Shǐzhōngxīng	Arrow in the center of the star
Vermilion Bird of the South (南方朱雀)	井	Jǐng	Well	弧矢	Húshǐ	Bow and Arrow	δ CMa	Wezen	矢星	Shǐxīng	Star of the arrow
Vermilion Bird of the South (南方朱雀)	井	Jǐng	Well	弧矢	Húshǐ	Bow and Arrow	δ CMa	Wezen	天园东北星	Tiānyuándōngběixīng	Star in the northeast of Celestial Orchard constellation
Vermilion Bird of the South (南方朱雀)	井	Jǐng	Well	弧矢	Húshǐ	Bow and Arrow	η CMa	Aludra			
Vermilion Bird of the South (南方朱雀)	井	Jǐng	Well	弧矢	Húshǐ	Bow and Arrow	η CMa	Aludra	弧矢二	Húshǐèr	2nd star
Vermilion Bird of the South (南方朱雀)	井	Jǐng	Well	弧矢	Húshǐ	Bow and Arrow	η CMa	Aludra	矢后星	Shǐhòuxīng	Arrow in front of the star
Vermilion Bird of the South (南方朱雀)	井	Jǐng	Well	弧矢	Húshǐ	Bow and Arrow	ε CMa	Adhara (for component A)			
Vermilion Bird of the South (南方朱雀)	井	Jǐng	Well	弧矢	Húshǐ	Bow and Arrow	ε CMa	Adhara (for component A)	弧矢七	Húshǐqī	7th star
Vermilion Bird of the South (南方朱雀)	井	Jǐng	Well	弧矢	Húshǐ	Bow and Arrow	ε CMa	Adhara (for component A)	弧矢西第二星	Húshǐxīdìèrxīng	Second western star
Vermilion Bird of the South (南方朱雀)	井	Jǐng	Well	弧矢	Húshǐ	Bow and Arrow	κ CMa		弧矢八	Húshǐbā	8th star
Vermilion Bird of the South (南方朱雀)	井	Jǐng	Well	弧矢	Húshǐ	Bow and Arrow	10 CMa		弧矢增一	Húshǐzēngyī	1st additional star
Vermilion Bird of the South (南方朱雀)	井	Jǐng	Well	弧矢	Húshǐ	Bow and Arrow	σ CMa	Nganurganity	弧矢增二	Húshǐzēngèr	2nd additional star
Vermilion Bird of the South (南方朱雀)	井	Jǐng	Well	弧矢	Húshǐ	Bow and Arrow	ω CMa		弧矢增三	Húshǐzēngsān	3rd additional star
Vermilion Bird of the South (南方朱雀)	井	Jǐng	Well	弧矢	Húshǐ	Bow and Arrow	27 CMa		弧矢增四	Húshǐzēngsì	4th additional star
Vermilion Bird of the South (南方朱雀)	井	Jǐng	Well	弧矢	Húshǐ	Bow and Arrow	26 CMa		弧矢增五	Húshǐzēngwǔ	5th additional star
Vermilion Bird of the South (南方朱雀)	井	Jǐng	Well	弧矢	Húshǐ	Bow and Arrow	τ CMa		弧矢增六	Húshǐzēngliù	6th additional star
Vermilion Bird of the South (南方朱雀)	井	Jǐng	Well	弧矢	Húshǐ	Bow and Arrow	UW CMa		弧矢增七	Húshǐzēngqī	7th additional star
Vermilion Bird of the South (南方朱雀)	井	Jǐng	Well	弧矢	Húshǐ	Bow and Arrow	FV CMa		弧矢增二十五	Húshǐzēngèrshíwǔ	25th additional star
Vermilion Bird of the South (南方朱雀)	井	Jǐng	Well	弧矢	Húshǐ	Bow and Arrow	LZ CMa		弧矢增二十六	Húshǐzēngèrshíliù	26th additional star

== See also ==
- Chinese astronomy
- Traditional Chinese star names
- Chinese constellations
