= Eta Canis Majoris =

Blue supergiant star in the constellation Canis Major

η Canis Majoris
- Location of η Canis Majoris (circled)

Observation data Epoch J2000 Equinox ICRS
- Constellation: Canis Major
- Right ascension: 07^{h} 24^{m} 05.70228^{s}
- Declination: −29° 18′ 11.1798″
- Apparent magnitude (V): 2.38 – 2.48

Characteristics
- Evolutionary stage: Blue supergiant, likely a post-red supergiant
- Spectral type: B5 Ia
- U−B color index: −0.708
- B−V color index: −0.087
- Variable type: α Cyg

Astrometry
Radial velocity (R_{v})	41.1 km/s
Proper motion (μ)	RA: −4.14 mas/yr Dec.: 5.81 mas/yr
Parallax (π)	1.64±0.40 mas
Distance	approx. 2,000 ly (approx. 600 pc)
Absolute magnitude (M_{V})	−7.0

Details
Mass	5.5 or 9.5 M_{☉}
Radius	54 R_{☉}
Luminosity	163,800+4,200 −15,900 L_{☉}
Surface gravity (log g)	1.95+0.02 −0.03 cgs
Temperature	15,800+100 −400 K
Rotational velocity (v sin i)	51.5±5.0 km/s
Age	8.3 Myr

Other designations
- Aludra, η Canis Majoris, 31 Canis Majoris, CD−29°4328, FK5 283, HD 58350, HIP 35904, HR 2827, SAO 173651

Database references
SIMBAD	data

Eta Canis Majoris is a blue supergiant star in the constellation of Canis Major. It has the proper name Aludra, pronounced /əˈluːdrə, əˈljuːdrə/; Eta Canis Majoris is its Bayer designation. This star has an apparent visual magnitude that varies between 2.38 and 2.48, which makes it the fifth-brightest in the constellation. Parallax measurements from the Hipparcos mission estimate a large distance of 2,000 light-years. It is drifting further away from the Sun with a line of sight velocity of 41 km/s.

== Nomenclature ==
η Canis Majoris, Latinised to Eta Canis Majoris, is the star's Bayer designation, abbreviated Eta CMa or η CMa.

The traditional name Aludra originates from the Arabic: العذراء al-adhraa, 'the virgin'. This star, along with Epsilon Canis Majoris (Adhara), Delta Canis Majoris (Wezen) and Omicron^{2} Canis Majoris (Thanih al Adzari), were Al 'Adhārā (العذاري), 'the Virgins'. In 2016, the International Astronomical Union organized a Working Group on Star Names (WGSN) to catalog and standardize proper names for stars. The WGSN's first bulletin of July 2016 included a table of the first two batches of names approved by the WGSN; which included Aludra for this star.

In Chinese, 弧矢 (Hú Shǐ), meaning Bow and Arrow, refers to an asterism consisting of Eta Canis Majoris, Delta Canis Majoris, HD 63032, HD 65456, Omicron Puppis, k Puppis, Epsilon Canis Majoris, Kappa Canis Majoris and Pi Puppis. Consequently, Eta Canis Majoris itself is known as 弧矢二 (Hú Shǐ èr, English: the Second Star of Bow and Arrow).

== Properties ==
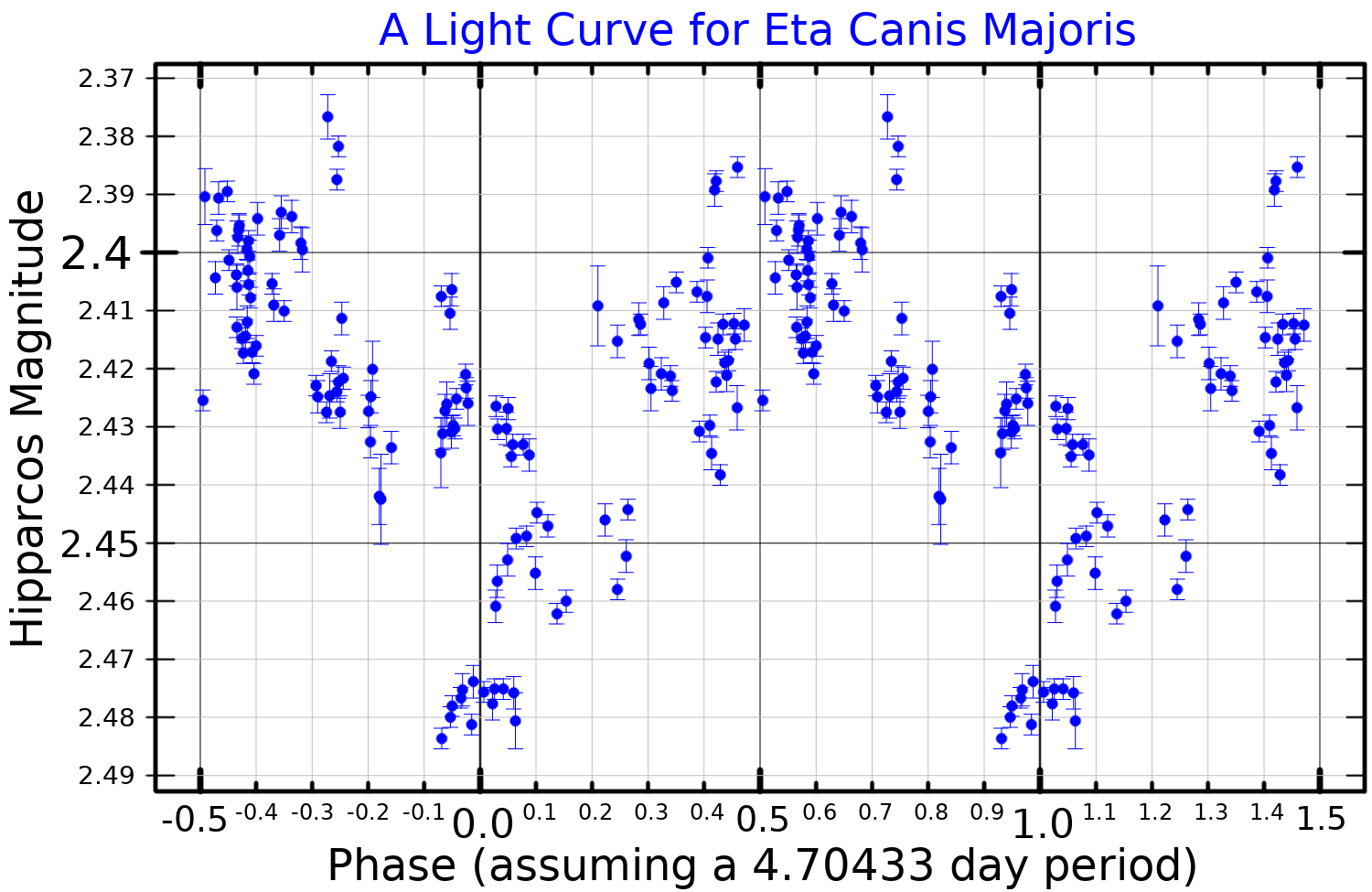
A light curve for Eta Canis Majoris, plotted from Hipparcos data

Eta Canis Majoris is a blue supergiant star with a spectral type of B5Ia. It has been the standard for this spectral class in the Morgan–Keenan system, and since 1943, the spectrum of this star has served as one of the stable anchor points by which other stars are classified.

This is likely a post-red supergiant, a star which left its red supergiant phase and is near the end of its life. As a consequence, Aludra has lost significant part of its mass. It formed with a mass of 22 M_{☉} and now has either 5.5 or 9.5 M_{☉}, depending on the estimate. The present day mass loss rate is estimated at (0.12±0.01)×10^{−6} M_{☉}·yr^{−1}, or one solar mass every 8.3 million years.

Aludra shines brightly in the skies in spite of a large distance from Earth due to being intrinsically many times brighter than the Sun. It has a luminosity over 100,000 times and a radius around 54 times that of the Sun. The star has only existed for a fraction of the time the Sun has, less than 10 million years, yet is already in the final stages of its life.

The star is classified as an Alpha Cygni-type variable star and its brightness varies from magnitude +2.38 to +2.48 over a period of 4.7 days.

== Namesakes ==
Both USS Aludra (AF-55), an Alstede-class stores ship, and USS Aludra (AK-72), a Crater-class cargo ship, were U.S. Navy vessels named after the star.
