= Pi Puppis =

Second-brightest star in the constellation of Puppis

π Puppis
- Location of π Puppis (circled)

Observation data Epoch J2000 Equinox ICRS
- Constellation: Puppis
- Right ascension: 07^{h} 17^{m} 08.55678^{s}
- Declination: −37° 05′ 50.8962″
- Apparent magnitude (V): 2.69 – 2.76

Characteristics
- Spectral type: K3 Ib
- U−B color index: +1.238
- B−V color index: +1.608
- Variable type: SRd

Astrometry
Radial velocity (R_{v})	+15.8 km/s
Proper motion (μ)	RA: −10.05 mas/yr Dec.: +6.47 mas/yr
Parallax (π)	4.04±0.33 mas
Distance	810 ± 70 ly (250 ± 20 pc)
Absolute magnitude (M_{V})	−4.5

Details
Mass	11.7±0.2 M_{☉}
Radius	235 R_{☉}
Luminosity	11,378 L_{☉}
Surface gravity (log g)	0.13 cgs
Temperature	3,990–4,055 K
Age	20.0±3.9 Myr

Other designations
- π Pup, CPD−36°1211, FK5 278, GC 9706, HD 56855, HIP 35264, HR 2773, SAO 197795, PPM 283747, CCDM J07171-3706A, WDS J07171-3706A

Database references
SIMBAD	data

Pi Puppis, Latinized from π Puppis, is the second-brightest star in the southern constellation of Puppis. It is sometimes called by the unofficial name Ahadi. It has an apparent visual magnitude of about 2.7, so it can be viewed with the naked eye at night. Parallax measurements yield an estimated distance of roughly 810 light-years (250 parsecs) from the Earth. This is a double star with a magnitude 6.86 companion at an angular separation of 0.72 arcsecond and a position angle of 148° from the brighter primary.

== Description ==
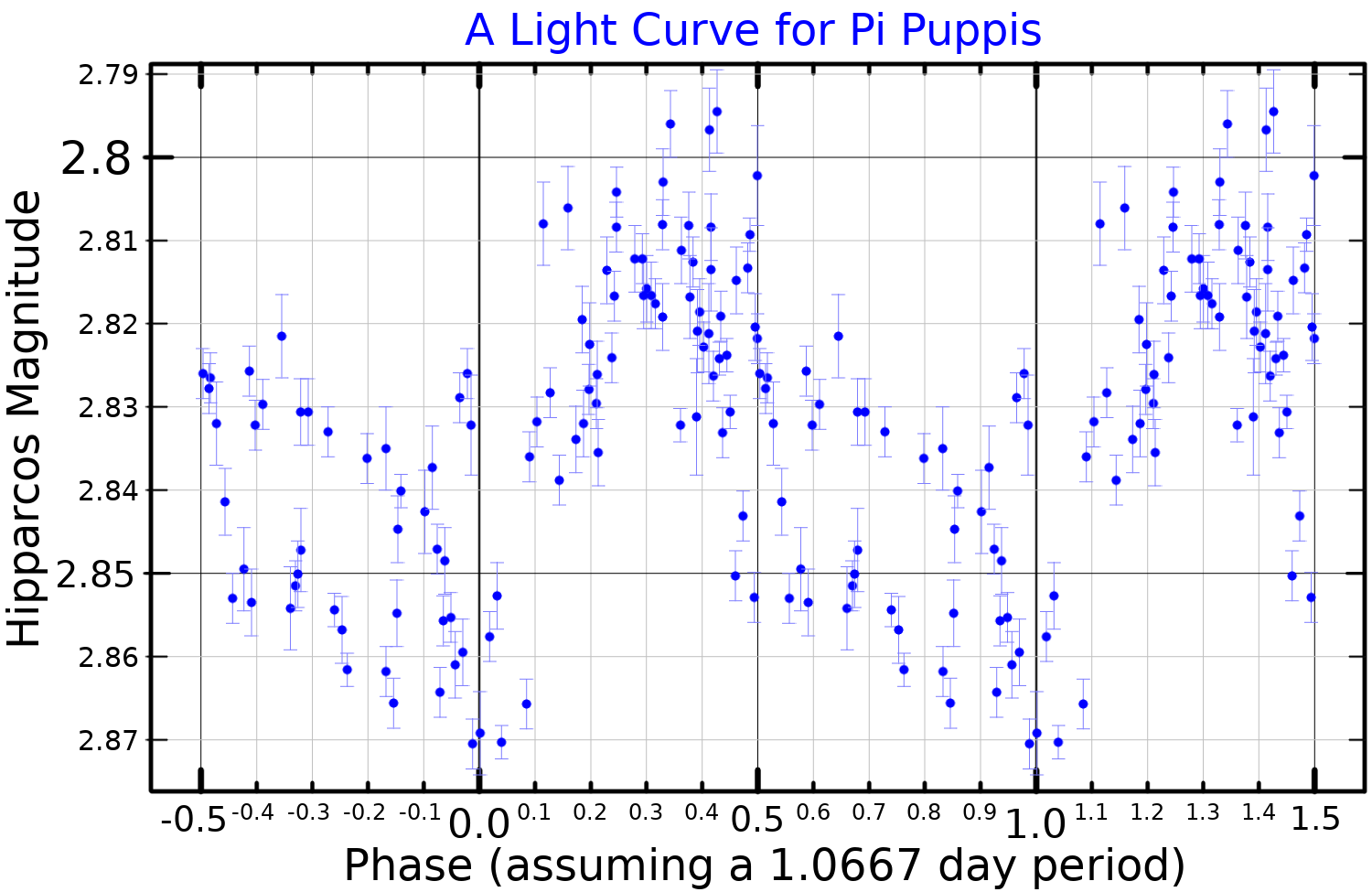
A light curve for Pi Puppis, plotted from Hipparcos data, folded with the period derived by Koen and Eyer (2002)

The spectrum of Pi Puppis matches a stellar classification of K3 Ib. The Ib luminosity class indicates this a lower luminosity supergiant star that has consumed the hydrogen fuel at its core, evolved away from the main sequence, and expanded to about 235 times the Sun's radius. The effective temperature of the star's outer envelope is approximately 4,000 K, which gives it the orange hue of a K-type star. With a mass 11.7 times that of the Sun, this is a short-lived star with an estimated age of 20 million years.

It is a semiregular variable star that varies in apparent magnitude from a high of 2.70 down to 2.85. Pi Puppis is the brightest star in the open cluster Collinder 135.

== Nomenclature ==
This star does not seem to have had a traditional proper name, but some 21st-century sources use the name Ahadi, which is derived from Arabic for "having much promise". This name appears in the SIMBAD database and at least one academic paper.

In Chinese, 弧矢 (Hú Shǐ), meaning Bow and Arrow, refers to an asterism consisting of π Puppis, δ Canis Majoris, η Canis Majoris, HD 63032, HD 65456, ο Puppis, k Puppis, ε Canis Majoris and κ Canis Majoris. Consequently, π Puppis itself is known as 弧矢九 (Hú Shǐ jiǔ, English: the Ninth Star of Bow and Arrow).

== Observation ==
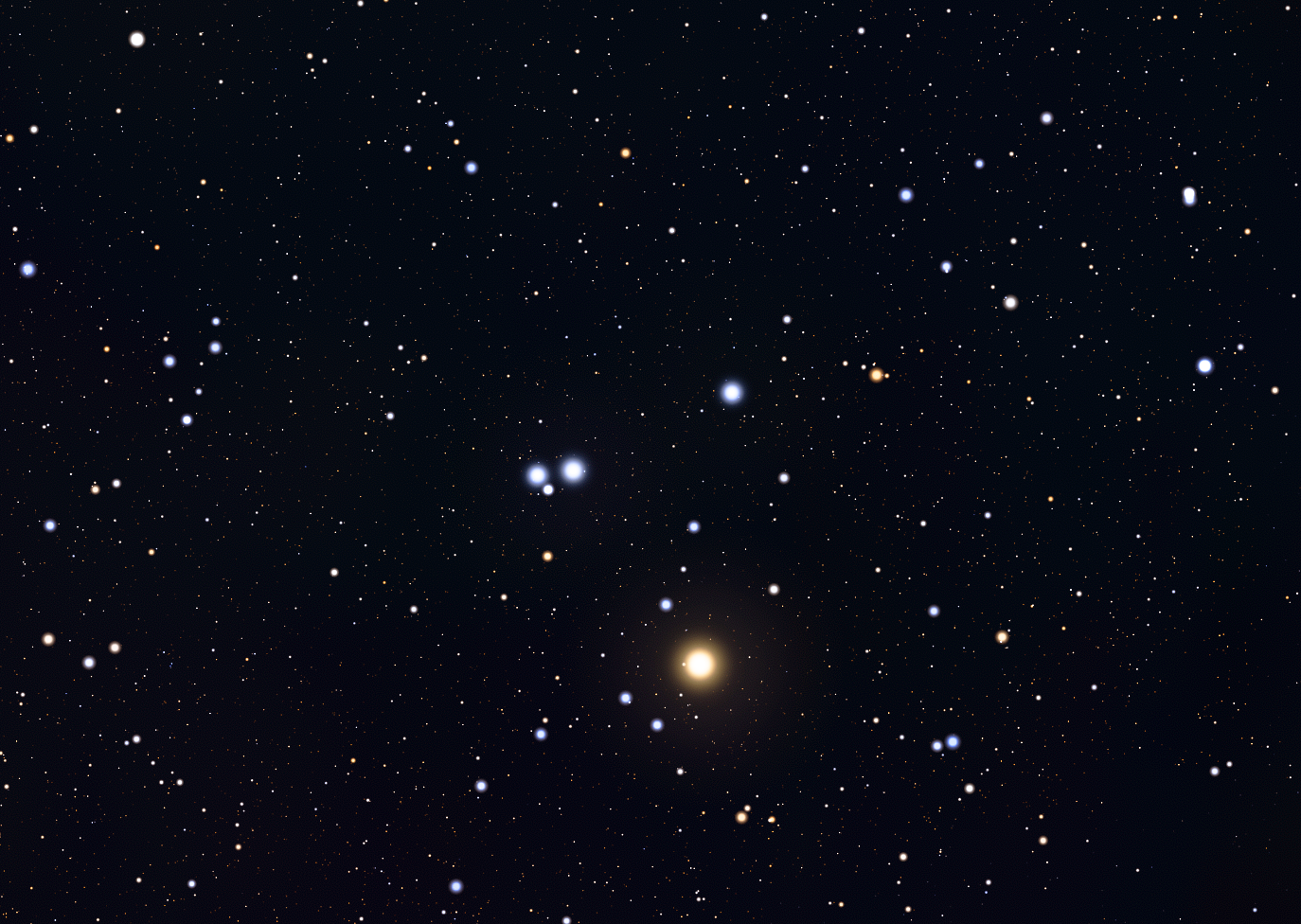
Collinder 135

Pi Puppis is a semiregular variable star with an apparent magnitude of 2.733. It appears slightly orange in color with a B-V color index of +1.608, similar to that of the famous Mira. It is typically the second brightest star in Puppis, only behind the blue supergiant Naos, and the brightest star in the open cluster Collinder 135.

About every five years, the Pi Puppids, a meteor shower associated with the comet 26P/Grigg–Skjellerup, appears near the star in late April. The Pi Puppids are a variable meteor shower, with varying maximums each year.
