= X Puppis =

The Bayer designations X Puppis and x Puppis are distinct and refer to three different stars in the constellation Puppis:

- X Puppis, a δ Cephei variable
- X Puppis, (HR 2548, 38 G. Puppis) an F-type main-sequence star
- x Puppis, (HR 2518, HD 49591, 31 G. Puppis), a B-type main-sequence star

== See also ==
- Xi Puppis
- χ Puppis
