= Omicron Puppis =

Variable Star in the constellation Puppis

- Location of ο Puppis (circled)

Observation data Epoch J2000.0 Equinox J2000.0 (ICRS)
- Constellation: Puppis
- Right ascension: 07^{h} 48^{m} 05.16839^{s}
- Declination: −25° 56′ 13.8123″
- Apparent magnitude (V): +4.48

Characteristics
- Spectral type: B1 IVnne
- U−B color index: −1.02
- B−V color index: −0.09
- Variable type: LERI

Astrometry
Radial velocity (R_{v})	+15.0 km/s
Proper motion (μ)	RA: −10.09 mas/yr Dec.: +4.26 mas/yr
Parallax (π)	2.30±0.23 mas
Distance	1,400 ± 100 ly (430 ± 40 pc)
Absolute magnitude (M_{V})	−3.77

Orbit
Period (P)	28.903±0.004 d
Eccentricity (e)	0
Periastron epoch (T)	2456012.93 ± 0.04
Semi-amplitude (K_{2}) (secondary)	159.7±11.7 km/s

Details
Mass	15.5±0.8 M_{☉}
Radius	13.5 R_{☉}
Luminosity (bolometric)	59,279 L_{☉}
Surface gravity (log g)	2.90 cgs
Temperature	26,000 K
Rotational velocity (v sin i)	315 km/s
Age	11.1±0.5 Myr

Other designations
- ο Pup, CPD−25°2882, HD 63462, HIP 38070, HR 3045, SAO 174558, WDS J07481-2556A

Database references
SIMBAD	data

Omicron Puppis (ο Puppis) is candidate binary star system in the southern constellation of Puppis. It is visible to the naked eye, having a combined apparent visual magnitude of +4.48. Based upon an annual parallax shift of 2.30 mas as seen from Earth, it is located roughly 1,400 light years from the Sun.

This is a suspected close spectroscopic binary system. The spectrum varies with a periodicity of 28.9 days, and a helium emission component shows a radial velocity variation that matches the period. The properties indicate it may be a φ Per-like system with a Be star primary and a hot subdwarf companion of type sdO. If this is the case, then the pair have a circular orbit with a period that matches the variability. The close-orbiting pair may have undergone interaction in the past, leaving the subdwarf stripped down and the primary star spinning rapidly.

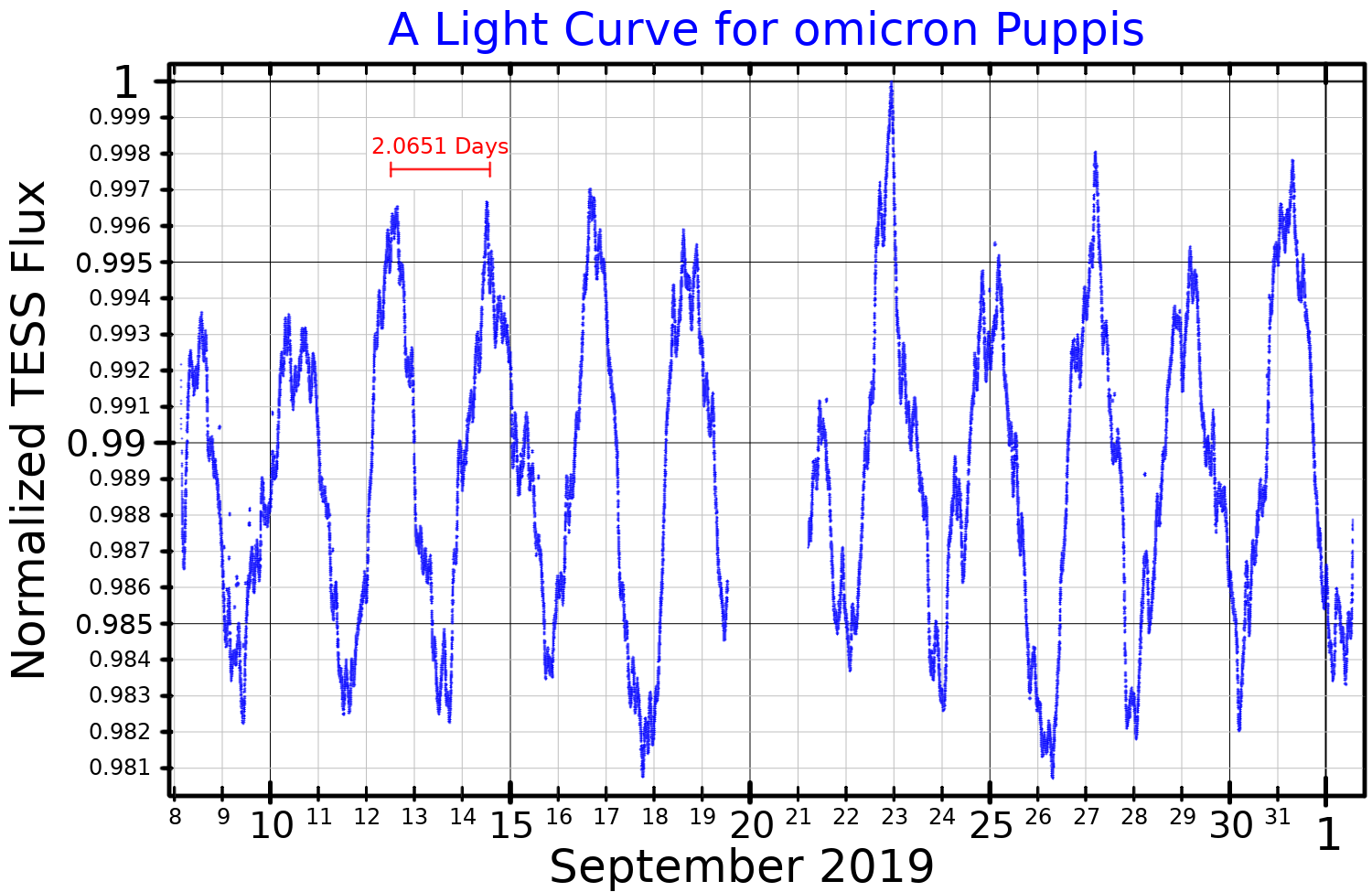
A light curve for Omicron Puppis, plotted from TESS data. The 2.0651 day period is shown in red.

ο Puppis is slightly variable. The General Catalogue of Variable Stars lists it as a possible Be star with a magnitude range of 4.43 - 4.46. The International Variable Star Index classifies it as a Lambda Eridani variable.

== Naming ==
The correct Bayer designation for ο Puppis has been debated. Lacaille assigned one Greek letter sequence for the bright stars of Argo Navis. These Lacaille designations are now shared across the three modern constellations of Carina, Puppis, and Vela so that (except for omicron) each Greek letter is found in only one of the three. However, ο (omicron) is now commonly used for two stars, one each in Vela and Puppis. In the Coelum Australe Stelliferum itself, this star is labelled (Latin) o Argus in puppi (Pouppe du Navire in the French edition), while ο Velorum is labelled ο (omicron) Argus (du Navire in the French edition). Some later authors state the reverse, that Lacaille actually assigned omicron to ο Puppis and Latin lower case 'o' to ο Velorum. Modern catalogs and atlases generally use omicron for both stars.

In Chinese, 弧矢 (Hú Shǐ), meaning Bow and Arrow, refers to an asterism consisting of ο Puppis, δ Canis Majoris, η Canis Majoris, HD 63032, HD 65456, k Puppis, ε Canis Majoris, κ Canis Majoris and π Puppis. Consequently, ο Puppis itself is known as 弧矢五 (Hú Shǐ wǔ, English: the Fifth Star of Bow and Arrow.)
