= Epsilon Canis Majoris =

Star in the constellation Canis Major

ε Canis Majoris
- Location of ε Canis Majoris (circled)

Observation data Epoch J2000 Equinox ICRS
- Constellation: Canis Major
- ε CMa A
- Right ascension: 06^{h} 58^{m} 37.54876^{s}
- Declination: −28° 58′ 19.5102″
- Apparent magnitude (V): 1.50
- ε CMa B
- Right ascension: 06^{h} 58^{m} 37.73467^{s}
- Declination: −28° 58′ 26.8595″
- Apparent magnitude (V): +7.5

Characteristics

ε CMa A
- Evolutionary stage: Blue giant, main sequence or stellar merger product
- Spectral type: B2 II or B2 III-II
- U−B color index: −0.93
- B−V color index: −0.21

ε CMa B
- Evolutionary stage: main sequence

Astrometry

ε CMa A
Radial velocity (R_{v})	+27.3±0.4 km/s
Proper motion (μ)	RA: +3.24 mas/yr Dec.: +1.33 mas/yr
Parallax (π)	8.05±0.14 mas
Distance	405 ± 7 ly (124 ± 2 pc)
Absolute magnitude (M_{V})	−3.97±0.04

ε CMa B
Radial velocity (R_{v})	+28.46±2.20 km/s
Proper motion (μ)	RA: +1.802 mas/yr Dec.: −0.610 mas/yr
Parallax (π)	7.6159±0.0223 mas
Distance	428 ± 1 ly (131.3 ± 0.4 pc)

Position (relative to A)
Component	B
Epoch of observation	2008
Angular distance	7.90″
Position angle	162°

Details

ε CMa A
Mass	13.1±2.3 M_{☉}
Radius	10.7±0.7 R_{☉}
Luminosity	19,900±1,600 L_{☉}
Surface gravity (log g)	3.50±0.05 cgs
Temperature	22,500±300 K
Rotation	5 days
Rotational velocity (v sin i)	25 km/s
Age	17.5 – 19 Myr

ε CMa B
Mass	1.52 M_{☉}
Radius	1.54 R_{☉}
Luminosity	6.13 L_{☉}
Surface gravity (log g)	4.15 cgs
Temperature	7,315 K

Other designations
- Adhara, Adharaz, Undara, ε CMa, 21 CMa, CD−28°3666, FK5 268, GC 9188, HD 52089, HIP 33579, HR 2618, SAO 172676, ADS 5654, WDS J06586-2858

Database references
SIMBAD	data
- B

Epsilon Canis Majoris is a binary star system and the second-brightest star in the constellation of Canis Major. Its name is a Bayer designation that is Latinised from ε Canis Majoris, and abbreviated Epsilon CMa or ε CMa. This is the 22nd-brightest star in the night sky with an apparent magnitude of 1.50. About 4.7 million years ago, it was the brightest star in the night sky, with an apparent magnitude of −3.99. Based upon parallax measurements obtained during the Hipparcos and the Gaia mission, it is about 405–428 light-years distant.

The two components are designated ε Canis Majoris A, officially named Adhara /əˈdɛərə/ – the traditional name of the system, and B.

== Nomenclature ==
ε Canis Majoris (Latinised to Epsilon Canis Majoris) is the binary system's Bayer designation. The designations of the two components as ε Canis Majoris A and B derive from the convention used by the Washington Multiplicity Catalog (WMC) for multiple star systems, and adopted by the International Astronomical Union (IAU).

ε Canis Majoris bore the traditional name Adhara (sometimes spelled Adara, Adard, Udara or Udra), derived from the Arabic word عذارى 'aðāra', "virgins". In 2016, the International Astronomical Union organized a Working Group on Star Names (WGSN) to catalogue and standardize proper names for stars. The WGSN decided to attribute proper names to individual stars rather than entire star systems. It approved the name Adhara for the star ε Canis Majoris A on 21 August 2016 and it is now so included in the List of IAU-approved Star Names.

In the 17th-century catalogue of stars in the Calendarium of Al Achsasi al Mouakket, this star was designated Aoul al Adzari (أول العذاري awwal al-adhara), which was translated into Latin as Prima Virginum, meaning First of the Virgins. Along with δ Canis Majoris (Wezen), η Canis Majoris (Aludra) and ο^{2} Canis Majoris (Thanih al Adzari), these stars were Al ʽAdhārā (العذاري), 'the Virgins'.

In Chinese, 弧矢 (Hú Shǐ), meaning Bow and Arrow, refers to an asterism consisting of ε Canis Majoris, δ Canis Majoris, η Canis Majoris, κ Canis Majoris, ο Puppis, π Puppis, χ Puppis, c Puppis and k Puppis. Consequently, ε Canis Majoris itself is known as 弧矢七 (Hú Shǐ qī, English: the Seventh Star of Bow and Arrow).

== Physical properties ==
ε Canis Majoris is a binary star. The primary, ε Canis Majoris A, has an apparent magnitude of +1.5 and belongs to the spectral classification B2. Its color is blue or blueish-white, due to the surface temperature of 22,200 K. It emits a total radiation equal to 38,700 times that of the Sun. This star is the brightest source of extreme ultraviolet in the night sky. It is the strongest source of photons capable of ionizing hydrogen atoms in interstellar gas near the Sun, and is very important in determining the ionization state of the Local Interstellar Cloud. Its rotation period is estimated to be about 5 days.

The exact evolutionary status of ε CMa A is uncertain. Spectroscopically it has been given the class B2 II, with the luminosity class of II indicating that is a bright giant, more luminous than a typical giant (luminosity class III). However, it appears less luminous than expected for this luminosity class, and is more likely of class B2 III-II. Two studies suggest ε CMa is still in the late main sequence (TAMS), rather than being a giant. One of these even suggested it could be the final product of a stellar merger. ε CMa A has sufficient mass to explode as a supernova.

The +7.5-magnitude (the absolute magnitude amounts to +1.9) companion star, ε Canis Majoris B, is 7.5″ away with a position angle of 161° of the main star. Despite the relatively large angular distance the components can only be resolved in large telescopes, since the primary is approximately 250 times brighter than its companion.

A few million years ago, ε Canis Majoris was much closer to the Sun than it is at present, causing it to be a much brighter star in the night sky. About 4.4 million years ago, Adhara was 9.3 parsecs (30 ly) from the Sun, and was the brightest star in the night sky with a magnitude of −4.13. (Note: The apparent magnitude was calculated via the equation $m_v\ =\ M_v - 5 + 5 log(d)$, where $m_v$ is the apparent magnitude, $M_v$ is the absolute magnitude and $d$ is the distance in parsecs. Values for M_{v} and d of −3.97 and 9.3 pc were used.) No other star has attained this brightness since, nor will any other star attain this brightness for at least five million years.

== In culture ==
USS Adhara (AK-71) was a U.S. Navy Crater-class cargo ship named after the star.

ε Canis Majoris appears on the national flag of Brazil, symbolising the state of Tocantins.
