= Kappa Canis Majoris =

Star in the constellation Canis Major

- Location of κ Canis Majoris (circled)

Observation data Epoch J2000.0 Equinox J2000.0 (ICRS)
- Constellation: Canis Major
- Right ascension: 06^{h} 49^{m} 50.45933^{s}
- Declination: −32° 30′ 30.5225″
- Apparent magnitude (V): +3.87

Characteristics
- Spectral type: B1.5 Ve
- U−B color index: −0.97
- B−V color index: −0.20
- Variable type: γ Cas

Astrometry
| Radial velocity (R_{v}) | +14.0±4.1 km/s |
| Proper motion (μ) | RA: −8.84 mas/yr Dec.: +3.73 mas/yr |
| Parallax (π) | 4.95±0.12 mas |
| Distance | 660 ± 20 ly (202 ± 5 pc) |
| Absolute magnitude (M_{V}) | −3.03 |

Details
| Mass | 12.2±0.3 M_{☉} |
| Radius | 5.9 R_{☉} |
| Luminosity (bolometric) | 18,876 L_{☉} |
| Surface gravity (log g) | 4.07 cgs |
| Temperature | 24,600 K |
| Rotational velocity (v sin i) | 290±6 km/s |
| Age | 13.3±1.2 Myr |

Other designations
- κ CMa, 13 Canis Majoris, CD−32°3404, FK5 1180, GC 8946, HD 50013, HIP 32759, HR 2538, SAO 197258

Database references
| SIMBAD | data |

Kappa Canis Majoris is a solitary, blue-white hued star in the constellation Canis Major. Its name is a Bayer designation that is Latinized from κ Canis Majoris, and abbreviated Kappa CMa or κ CMa. This star is visible to the naked eye with an apparent visual magnitude of +3.87. Based upon an annual parallax shift of 7.70 mas as seen from Earth, this star is located about 660 light years from the Sun. It is receding from the Sun with a line of sight velocity of +14 km/s.

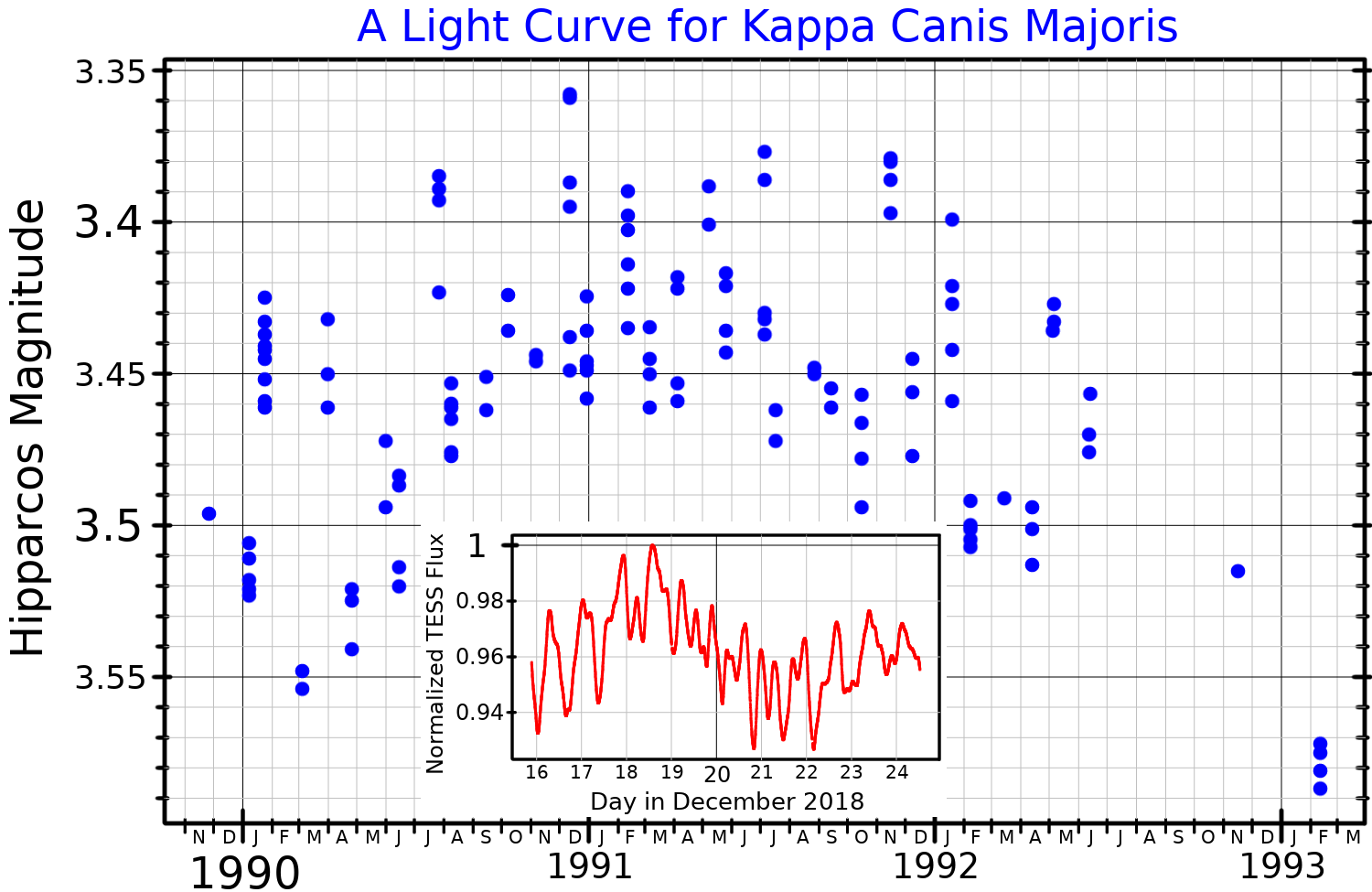
A light curve for Kappa Canis Majoris. The main plot, from Hipparcos data, shows the long-term variability and the inset plot, from TESS data, shows the short-term variability.

This is a massive B-type main-sequence star with a stellar classification of B1.5 Ve, although Hiltner et al. (1969) classified it as B1.5 IVe suggesting it is a subgiant star. The 'e' suffix indicates it is a rapidly rotating Be star with a circumstellar decretion disk of heated gas. The radius of the emitting disk is about 0.20±0.06 AU, or about 3.7 times the radius of the star. It is classified as a Gamma Cassiopeiae type variable star and its brightness varies from magnitude +3.4 to +3.97. The star became 50% brighter between 1963 and 1978, increasing from magnitude 3.96 or so to 3.52.

This star is about 13.3 million years old and spinning with a projected rotational velocity of 290 km/s. It has 6 times the radius of the Sun and 12 times the Sun's mass. The star is emitting 18,876 times the luminosity of the Sun from its photosphere at an effective temperature of 24,600 K.

== Naming ==
In Chinese, 弧矢 (Hú Shǐ), meaning Bow and Arrow, refers to an asterism consisting of κ Canis Majoris, δ Canis Majoris, η Canis Majoris, HD 63032, HD 65456, ο Puppis, k Puppis, ε Canis Majoris and π Puppis. Consequently, κ Canis Majoris itself is known as 弧矢八 (Hú Shǐ bā, English: the Eighth Star of Bow and Arrow.)
