= O Puppis =

The Bayer designations O Puppis and o Puppis are distinct and refer to two different stars in the constellation Puppis:

- O Puppis (HD 65685, HR 3121) a red giant star with an apparent magnitude of 5.17
- o Puppis (HD 63462, HR 3045, Omicron Puppis), a B-type main-sequence star which designation was misinterpreted as Omicron Puppis
