= NGC 2546 =

Open cluster in the constellation Puppis

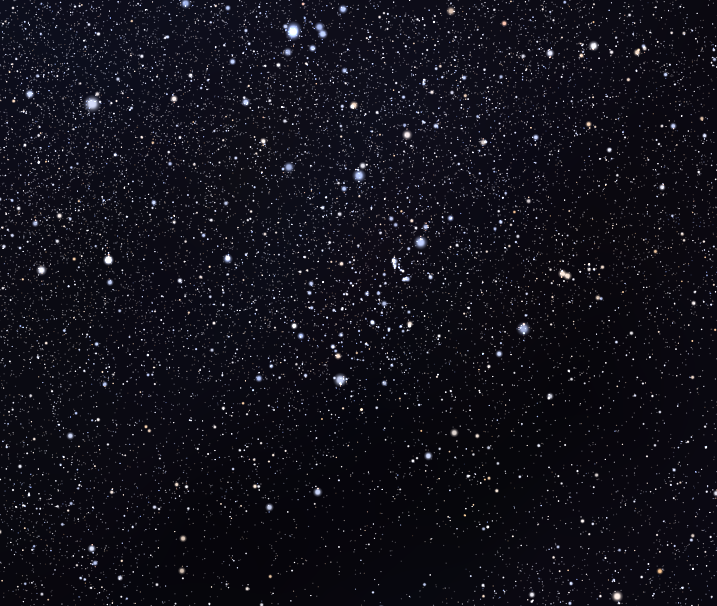
- NGC 2546 (taken from Stellarium)

Observation data (J2000.0 epoch)
- Right ascension: 08^{h} 12^{m} 19.7^{s}
- Declination: −37° 39′ 40″
- Distance: A: 3,100 ly (950 pc); B: 4,700 ly (1,450 pc)
- Apparent magnitude (V): 6.3
- Apparent dimensions (V): 41′

Physical characteristics
- Radius: 36 ly
- Other designations: NGC 2546, Cr 178, Dunlop 563, Lacaille II.4

Associations
- Constellation: Puppis

NGC 2546, also known as the Heart and Dagger Cluster or Wounded Heart Cluster, is a pair of independent but overlapping open clusters located in the southern constellation of Puppis. This grouping was discovered by French astronomer Abbe Lacaille in 1751-1752 from South Africa. NGC 2546 is just visible to the naked eye as a fuzzy patch; the brightest component has an apparent visual magnitude of 6.44. The brighter members are readily resolved with a pair of 10×50 binoculars.

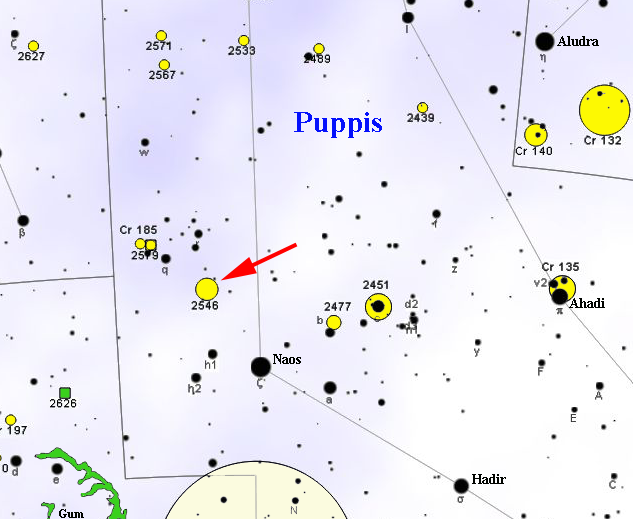
Map showing the location of NGC 2546

Prior to 2020, this cluster had been poorly studied. It was considered rather poor in stars but extensive with a Trumpler class of III 1m. The distribution was found to be elongated in a north–south direction with an angular size of 50′ x 25′. The cluster has an estimated 85 members brighter than visual magnitude 14.5. The age of the cluster was thought to be 3×10^{7} years. Three Ap stars were detected. Cluster member AS Puppis is a candidate mass-losing AGB star.

A 2020 study by A. J. Alejo and associates demonstrated that two physically distinct stellar groups occupy the region of NGC 2546. Membership in the two clusters could be distinguished by multiple parameters, with the radial velocity, spectral type, and reddening from extinction being the most significant. The more populated cluster, designated NGC 2546A, is located at a distance of 3,100 ly (950 pc) and is about 180 Myr old with a half-member radius of 26 ly (8 pc). The second cluster, NGC 2546B, lies 4,700 ly (1,450 pc) from the Sun and is less than 10 million years old with a half-member radius of 5.2 ly (1.6 pc). The angular separation between the center of two clusters is 17′.
