= Markeb =

Markeb (a variant form of Markab) is the proper name for some stars.

- Markeb, the IAU-approved proper name of the star Kappa Velorum, in the constellation of Vela
- Markeb, a traditional name sometimes used for the star k Puppis, in the constellation of Puppis
