= C71 =

C71 may refer to:

- Honda C71, C76, C72, C77 Dream, motorcycle different models
- Brain tumor ICD-10 code
- Ruy Lopez, chess openings ECO code
- Caldwell 71 (NGC 2477), an open cluster in the constellation Puppis

C-71 may refer to:

- C-71 (Michigan county highway)
- C-71 Executive, an aircraft
