= HD 63399 =

Star in the constellation Puppis

Observation data Epoch J2000 Equinox ICRS
- Constellation: Puppis
- Right ascension: 07^{h} 47^{m} 14.59403^{s}
- Declination: −36° 04′ 24.9619″
- Apparent magnitude (V): 6.45±0.01

Characteristics
- Evolutionary stage: red giant branch
- Spectral type: K1 III
- U−B color index: +1.13
- B−V color index: +1.12

Astrometry
Radial velocity (R_{v})	28.5±0.2 km/s
Proper motion (μ)	RA: −35.000 mas/yr Dec.: +26.931 mas/yr
Parallax (π)	7.3283±0.0162 mas
Distance	445.1 ± 1.0 ly (136.5 ± 0.3 pc)
Absolute magnitude (M_{V})	+0.78

Details
Mass	1.29 or 1.7^{+1.3}_{−0.8} M_{☉}
Radius	10.79 R_{☉}
Luminosity	54.8±0.3 L_{☉}
Surface gravity (log g)	2.47 cgs
Temperature	4,761±77 K
Metallicity [Fe/H]	−0.06 dex

Other designations
- CD−35°3874, CPD−35°1579, GC 10510, HD 63399, HIP 37996, SAO 198437

Database references
SIMBAD	data

HD 63399 is an orange hued star located in the southern constellation Puppis. It has an apparent magnitude of 6.45, placing it near the limit for naked eye visibility. Based on parallax measurements from Gaia DR3, the object is estimated to be 445 light years distant. It appears to be receding with a spectroscopic radial velocity of 28.5 km/s. At its current distance, HD 63399 is diminished by 0.29 magnitudes due to interstellar dust.

HD 63399 is a red giant star that is currently on the red giant branch, fusing hydrogen in a shell around its core. It has a stellar classification of K1 III. At present it has a mass ranging from 1.3 to 1.7 times the mass of the Sun, depending on the study. HD 63399 has expanded to 10.8 times its girth and now radiates 54.8 times the luminosity of the Sun from its swollen photosphere at an effective temperature of 4,761 K. The star has an iron abundance 13% below solar levels, making it slightly metal deficient.
