= HD 71334 =

Star in the constellation of Puppis

Observation data Epoch J2000 Equinox J2000
- Constellation: Puppis
- Right ascension: 08^{h} 25^{m} 49.51557^{s}
- Declination: −29° 55′ 50.1338″
- Apparent magnitude (V): 7.8

Characteristics
- Evolutionary stage: main sequence
- Spectral type: G2.5V

Astrometry
Proper motion (μ)	RA: +139.242 mas/yr Dec.: −292.471 mas/yr
Parallax (π)	25.4904±0.0174 mas
Distance	127.95 ± 0.09 ly (39.23 ± 0.03 pc)
Absolute magnitude (M_{V})	4.94

Details
Mass	0.94 M_{☉}
Radius	1.045 R_{☉}
Luminosity	0.993 L_{☉}
Surface gravity (log g)	4.374 cgs
Temperature	5,701 K
Metallicity [Fe/H]	−0.075 dex
Rotational velocity (v sin i)	1.60±0.11 km/s
Age	8.1 Gyr

Other designations
- HD 71334, HIP 41317, CD−29°6145, GJ 306.1, GJ 9263

Database references
SIMBAD	data

HD 71334 is a Sun-like star 128 light years (39 parsecs) from the Sun. HD 71334 is a G-type star and an older solar analog. It is older than the sun at 8.1 billion years, compared to the sun at 4.6 billion years old. At 8.1 billion years old, HD 71334 has passed its stable burning stage. HD 71334 has a lower metallicity that the Sun. HD 71334 is found in the constellations of Puppis. Puppis is one of the 88 modern constellations recognized by the International Astronomical Union. HD 71334 has a brightness of 7.8.

== Sun comparison ==
Chart compares the sun to HD 71334.

Identifier	J2000 Coordinates		Distance (ly)	Stellar Class	Temperature (K)	Metallicity (dex)	Age (Gyr)	Notes
Identifier	Right ascension	Declination	Distance (ly)	Stellar Class	Temperature (K)	Metallicity (dex)	Age (Gyr)	Notes
Sun	—	—	0.00	G2V	5,778	+0.00	4.6	
HD 71334	08^{h} 25^{m} 49.5^{s}	−29° 55′ 50″	124	G2.5V	5,701	−0.075	8.1	

== See also ==
- List of nearest stars
