= Wesen =

Wesen may refer to:

- An alternate spelling of Wezen, the traditional name for the star Delta Canis Majoris
- A supernatural being (non-human) from the fantasy-horror TV series Grimm
- The German word for "essence", used with reference to Christianity in Ludwig Feuerbach's The Essence of Christianity (German: Das Wesen des Christentums)
