= Markab =

Markab may refer to:

== Stars ==
- Alpha Pegasi
- Tau Pegasi
- k Puppis, erroneously
- Kappa Velorum

== Other uses ==
- Markab (horse), a Thoroughbred racehorse
- Markab (village), a place in Sudan
- Margat, a castle in Syria
- Markab, a fictional civilization in Babylon 5

== See also ==
- Marcab Confederacy, a galactic civilization according to Scientology
- Markeb (disambiguation)
