= HD 64440 =

Star in the constellation Puppis

- Location of HD 64440 (circled)

Observation data Epoch J2000 Equinox ICRS
- Constellation: Puppis
- Right ascension: 07^{h} 52^{m} 13.03173^{s}
- Declination: −40° 34′ 32.8318″
- Apparent magnitude (V): 3.71 (4.2 + 5.0)

Characteristics
- Spectral type: K1II+A0.5
- U−B color index: +0.75
- B−V color index: +1.05

Astrometry
Radial velocity (R_{v})	+24.00 km/s
Proper motion (μ)	RA: -18.00 mas/yr Dec.: +5.01 mas/yr
Parallax (π)	8.46±0.40 mas
Distance	390 ± 20 ly (118 ± 6 pc)
Absolute magnitude (M_{V})	-1.44

Orbit
Period (P)	6.13+0.031 −0.033 yr
Semi-major axis (a)	0.058+0.001 −0.003″
Eccentricity (e)	0.667+0.017 −0.018
Inclination (i)	79.683+2.798 −4.02°
Longitude of the node (Ω)	95.118+2.565 −2.183°
Periastron epoch (T)	1981.442+0.074 −0.084
Argument of periastron (ω) (secondary)	157.473+5.584 −3.427°

Details

A
Mass	6.058+0.15 −0.125 M_{☉}
Radius	30.75±1.64 R_{☉}
Luminosity	405±35 L_{☉}
Surface gravity (log g)	2.078±0.178 cgs
Temperature	4,670±72 K
Metallicity [Fe/H]	−0.048±0.052 dex
Rotational velocity (v sin i)	2.3 km/s

B
Mass	2.381+0.375 −0.334 M_{☉}

Other designations
- a Puppis, CD−40°3579, FK5 301, GC 10655, HD 64440, HIP 38414, HR 3080, WDS J07522-4035AB

Database references
SIMBAD	data

HD 64440, also known as a Puppis, is a binary star in the constellation Puppis. At a moderate brightness of 3.71, it is visible to the naked eye. Parallax measurements give a distance of 108 parsecs (350 light-years).

This is a spectroscopic binary of the single-lined type, meaning the spectral lines of only a component can be seen in the spectrum. The primary has a spectral type of K1.5II, which at first would make it a bright giant star, but this classification is unsupported by its relatively small absolute magnitude. The secondary is an early A-type star. They orbit with a period of about 6.13 years and have a high eccentricity of 0.667.
