= NGC 2354 =

Open cluster in the constellation Canis Major

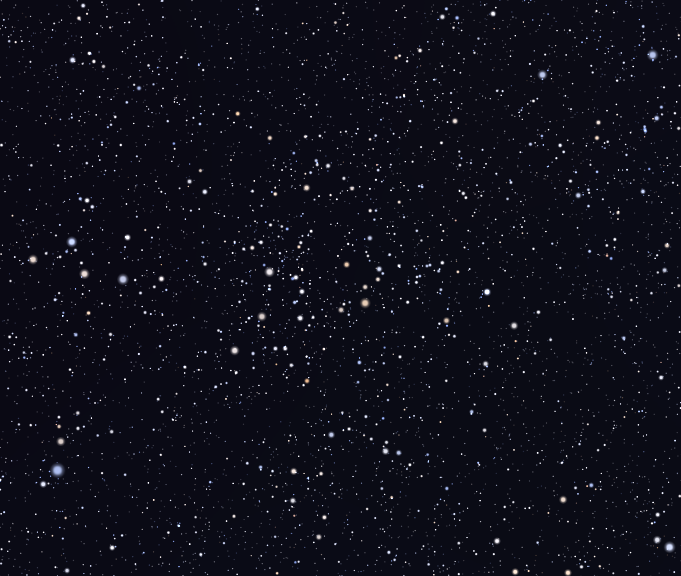
- NGC 2354 (taken from Stellarium)

Observation data (J2000 epoch)
- Right ascension: 07^{h} 14^{m} 10^{s}
- Declination: –25° 41.4′
- Apparent magnitude (V): 6.5
- Apparent dimensions (V): 18′

Physical characteristics
- Other designations: Cr 131

Associations
- Constellation: Canis Major

NGC 2354 is an open cluster of stars in the constellation of Canis Major. It lies 2 degrees southwest from NGC 2362 and northeast of Delta Canis Majoris. About 15 member stars are visible through binoculars.
