= 20 Puppis =

Star in the constellation Puppis

- Location of 20 Puppis (circled)

Observation data Epoch J2000 Equinox ICRS
- Constellation: Puppis
- Right ascension: 08^{h} 13^{m} 19.96710^{s}
- Declination: −15° 47′ 17.6008″
- Apparent magnitude (V): 4.99

Characteristics
- Spectral type: G4 Ib-II
- U−B color index: +0.78
- B−V color index: +1.07

Astrometry
Radial velocity (R_{v})	+16.80 km/s
Proper motion (μ)	RA: −12.718 mas/yr Dec.: −4.270 mas/yr
Parallax (π)	3.2906±0.1404 mas
Distance	990 ± 40 ly (300 ± 10 pc)
Absolute magnitude (M_{V})	−2.12

Details
Mass	5.2±0.2 M_{☉}
Radius	47.60+1.55 −1.16 R_{☉}
Luminosity	1,087.12±53.98 L_{☉}
Surface gravity (log g)	0.80 cgs
Temperature	4,804+59 −77 K
Metallicity [Fe/H]	−0.18 dex
Rotational velocity (v sin i)	6.9 km/s
Age	90 Myr

Other designations
- 20 Pup, BD−15°2324, FK5 311, GC 11184, HD 68752, HIP 40259, HR 3229, SAO 153993, GSC 05996-02764

Database references
SIMBAD	data

20 Puppis is a solitary star in the southern constellation of Puppis. It is visible to the naked eye as a faint, yellow-hued star with an apparent visual magnitude of 4.99. The star lies approximately 990 light years away from the Sun based on parallax. It is receding from the Earth with a heliocentric radial velocity of +16.8 km/s.

This object has a stellar classification of G4 Ib-II, matching a G-type star with a luminosity class part way between a bright giant and a supergiant star. It is just 90 million years old with around five times the mass of the Sun. The star has expanded to 48 times the Sun's radius and is radiating 1,087 times as much luminosity as the Sun from its enlarged photosphere at an effective temperature of 4,804 K.
