= 19 Puppis =

Binary star in the constellation Puppis

- Location of 19 Puppis (circled)

Observation data Epoch J2000 Equinox ICRS
- Constellation: Puppis
- Right ascension: 08^{h} 11^{m} 16.30585^{s}
- Declination: −12° 55′ 37.1952″
- Apparent magnitude (V): 4.72

Characteristics
- Spectral type: G9III-IIIb
- U−B color index: +0.76
- B−V color index: +0.96

Astrometry
Radial velocity (R_{v})	+36.07 km/s
Proper motion (μ)	RA: −25.79 mas/yr Dec.: +8.09 mas/yr
Parallax (π)	18.46±0.21 mas
Distance	177 ± 2 ly (54.2 ± 0.6 pc)
Absolute magnitude (M_{V})	1.05

Details
Mass	1.05 M_{☉}
Radius	8.9 R_{☉}
Luminosity	43.31 L_{☉}
Surface gravity (log g)	2.56 cgs
Temperature	4,750 K
Metallicity [Fe/H]	+0.06 dex
Rotational velocity (v sin i)	2.0 km/s
Age	0.955+0.220 −0.185 Gyr

Other designations
- 19 Pup, BD−12°2385, GC 11134, HD 68290, HIP 40084, HR 3211, SAO 153942, CCDM J08112-1256AB, WDS J08113-1256AB, GSC 05434-03731, NGC 2542

Database references
SIMBAD	data

19 Puppis is a binary star system in the southern constellation of Puppis, near the northern border with Hydra and Monoceros. It is visible to the naked eye as a faint, yellow-hued star with an apparent visual magnitude of 4.72. The system is located approximately 177 light years away from the system based on parallax. It is receding from the Earth with a heliocentric radial velocity of +36 km/s, having come to within 31 light-years some 1.4 million years ago.

The primary, component A, is an aging giant star with a stellar classification of G9III-IIIb. It is a red clump giant, which indicates it is on the horizontal branch and is generating energy through helium fusion at its core. The star is about one billion years old with 1.05 times the mass of the Sun and 8.9 times the Sun's radius. It is radiating 43 times the luminosity of the Sun from its enlarged photosphere at an effective temperature of 4,750 K.

The secondary member, component B, is a magnitude 11.2 star at an angular separation of 2.1″ from the primary. Four visual companions have been reported. These are component C, at magnitude 13.2 and separation 30.7", D, at magnitude 8.9 and separation 57.8", E, at magnitude 9.37 and separation 70.1", and F, at magnitude 10.74 and separation 114.1".
