= 11 Puppis =

Star in the constellation Puppis

- Location of 11 Puppis (circled)

Observation data Epoch J2000 Equinox ICRS
- Constellation: Puppis
- Right ascension: 07^{h} 56^{m} 51.53900^{s}
- Declination: −22° 52′ 48.4340″
- Apparent magnitude (V): 4.20

Characteristics
- Spectral type: F7/8 II
- U−B color index: +0.44
- B−V color index: +0.72

Astrometry
Radial velocity (R_{v})	+13.30 km/s
Proper motion (μ)	RA: −30.42 mas/yr Dec.: +11.49 mas/yr
Parallax (π)	6.25±0.23 mas
Distance	520 ± 20 ly (160 ± 6 pc)
Absolute magnitude (M_{V})	−1.82

Details
Mass	2.7 M_{☉}
Luminosity	515 L_{☉}
Surface gravity (log g)	1.99 cgs
Temperature	5,868 K
Metallicity [Fe/H]	+0.09 dex
Rotational velocity (v sin i)	13.8 km/s

Other designations
- j Pup, 11 Pup, BD−22°2087, CD−22°5403, FK5 2615, GC 10756, HD 65228, HIP 38835, HR 3102, SAO 174852, GSC 06553-03890

Database references
SIMBAD	data

11 Puppis is a single star in the southern constellation of Puppis, located approximately 522 light years away based on parallax. It has the Bayer designation j Puppis; 11 Puppis is the Flamsteed designation. This object is visible to the naked eye as a faint, yellow-white star with an apparent visual magnitude of 4.20. It is moving further from the Earth with a heliocentric radial velocity of +13.3 km/s.

This is an evolved bright giant star with a stellar classification of F7/8 II. The spectrum displays a deficit of carbon, an excesses of nitrogen, and a high abundance of lithium. The first two anomalies suggest the giant has passed through a deep convection stage that would have also exhausted the lithium supply, indicating the current lithium abundance is of recent production. The star has 2.7 times the mass of the Sun and is radiating 515 times the Sun's luminosity from its enlarged photosphere at an effective temperature of 5,868 K.
