= HD 61831 =

Star in the constellation Puppis

- Location of HD 61831 (circled)

Observation data Epoch J2000 Equinox ICRS
- Constellation: Puppis
- Right ascension: 07^{h} 39^{m} 27.33834^{s}
- Declination: −38° 18′ 28.8786″
- Apparent magnitude (V): 4.84

Characteristics
- Spectral type: B2.5V
- U−B color index: −0.66
- B−V color index: −0.19

Astrometry
Radial velocity (R_{v})	+26.40 km/s
Proper motion (μ)	RA: −21.11 mas/yr Dec.: +15.81 mas/yr
Parallax (π)	5.87±0.16 mas
Distance	560 ± 20 ly (170 ± 5 pc)
Absolute magnitude (M_{V})	−1.51

Details
Mass	6.5 M_{☉}
Luminosity	1,300 L_{☉}
Temperature	16,849 K
Metallicity [Fe/H]	0.00 dex
Rotational velocity (v sin i)	138 km/s

Other designations
- d^{1} Puppis, CD−38°3531, GC 10311, GSC 07644-02700, HIP 37297, HR 2961, HD 61831, SAO 198253

Database references
SIMBAD	data

HD 61831 (d^{1} Puppis) is a class B2.5V (blue dwarf) star in the constellation Puppis. Its apparent magnitude is 4.84 and it is approximately 556 light years away based on parallax.
