= USS Adhara =

Cargo ship of the United States Navy

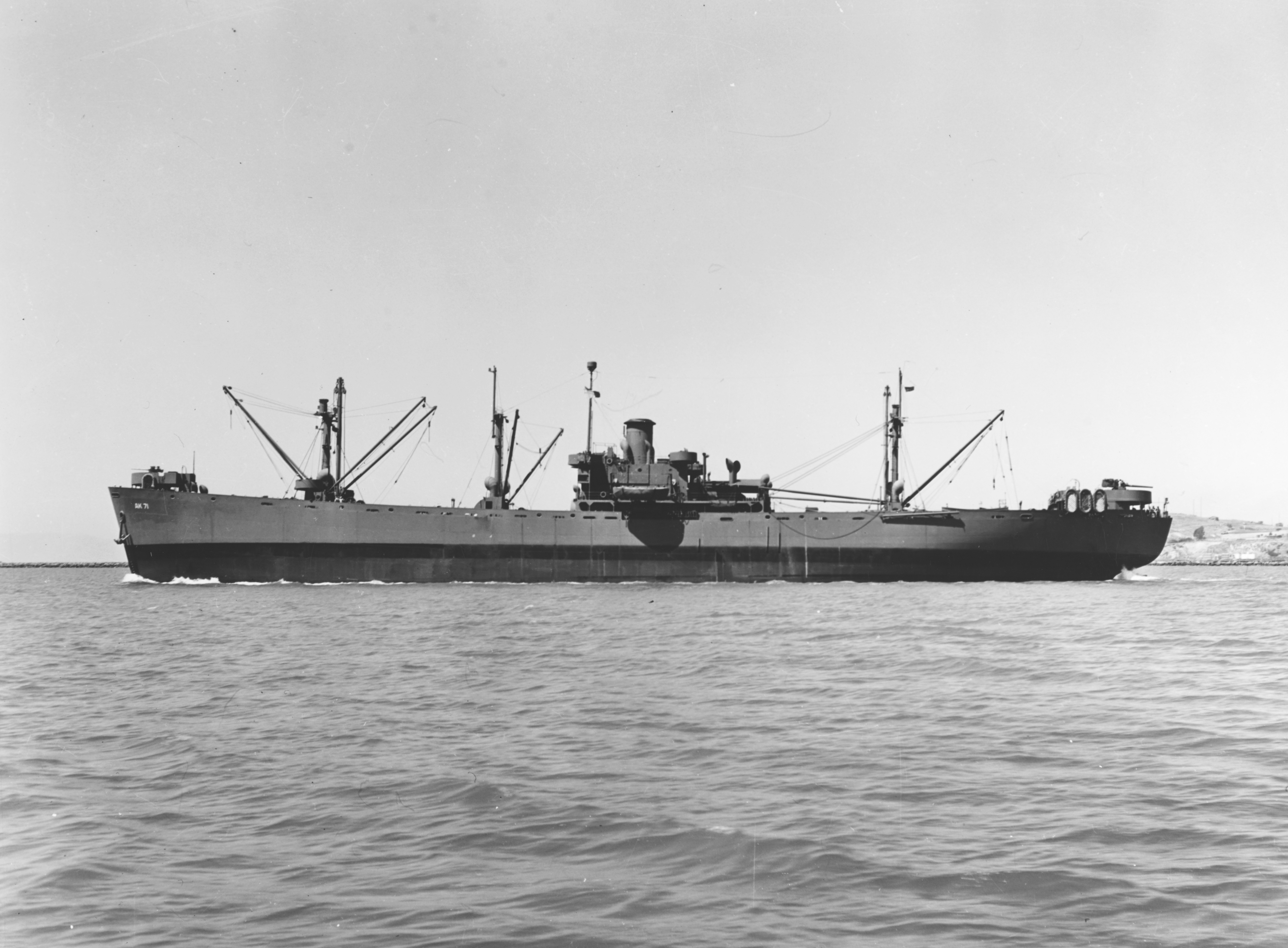
- USS Adhara (AK-71) off the Mare Island Navy Yard, 20 August 1943

History

United States
- Name: G. H. Corliss
- Namesake: George Henry Corliss
- Owner: War Shipping Administration (WSA)
- Operator: J.H. Winchester & Co., Inc.
- Ordered: as a Type EC2-S-C1 hull, MCE hull 425
- Builder: Permanente Metals Corporation, Richmond, California
- Cost: $1,142,406
- Yard number: 425
- Way number: 8
- Laid down: 16 September 1942
- Launched: 27 October 1942
- Sponsored by: Ginny Sims
- Identification: Call sign: KHUT
- Fate: Transferred to US Navy, 6 November 1942

United States
- Name: Adhara
- Namesake: The star Adhara
- Acquired: 6 November 1942
- Commissioned: 16 November 1942
- Decommissioned: 7 December 1945
- Stricken: 3 January 1946
- Identification: Hull symbol: AK-71; Code letters: NXUS
- Fate: Sold for scrapping, 26 October 1971
- Notes: Name reverted to G. H. Corliss when laid up in Reserve Fleet

General characteristics
- Class & type: Crater-class cargo ship
- Type: Type EC2-S-C1
- Displacement: 4,023 long tons (4,088 t) (standard); 14,550 long tons (14,780 t) (full load)
- Length: 441 ft 6 in (134.57 m)
- Beam: 56 ft 11 in (17.35 m)
- Draft: 28 ft 4 in (8.64 m)
- Installed power: 2 × Oil fired 450 °F (232 °C) boilers, operating at 220 psi (1,500 kPa) , (manufactured by Babcock & Wilcox); 2,500 shp (1,900 kW)
- Propulsion: 1 × Vertical triple-expansion reciprocating steam engine, (manufactured by Willamette Shipbuilding); 1 × screw propeller
- Speed: 12.5 kn (23.2 km/h; 14.4 mph)
- Capacity: 7,800 t (7,700 long tons) DWT; 444,206 cu ft (12,578.5 m^{3}) (non-refrigerated)
- Complement: 205
- Armament: 1 × 5 in (127 mm)/38 caliber dual-purpose (DP) gun; 1 × 3 in (76 mm)/50 caliber DP gun; 2 × 40 mm (1.57 in) Bofors anti-aircraft (AA) gun mounts; 6 × 20 mm (0.79 in) Oerlikon cannon AA gun mounts

USS Adhara (AK-71) was a Crater-class cargo ship in the service of the US Navy in the Pacific theater in World War II. Named after the star Adhara in the constellation Canis Major, it was the only ship of the Navy to bear this name.

== Construction ==
Adhara was laid down 16 September 1942 as liberty ship SS G. H. Corliss under a Maritime Commission (MARCOM) contract, MC hull 425, by Permanente Metals Corporation, Yard No. 2, Richmond, California; launched on 27 October 1942; sponsored by Miss Ginny Simms, the lead vocalist for Kay Kyser's orchestra; acquired by the Navy on 6 November 1942; renamed Adhara (AK-71); and commissioned on 16 November 1942.

== Service history ==
Adhara sailed from San Francisco, on 27 November bound for the South Pacific. For the next eight months, she served as a member of Service Squadron (ServRon) 8 transporting cargo and passengers between the ports of Tutuila, Samoa; Efate, New Hebrides; Espiritu Santo; Guadalcanal; Tulagi; Nouméa, New Caledonia; and Wellington, New Zealand.

While at Guadalcanal on 7 April 1943, Adhara was among several ships subjected to a Japanese air attack. Five bombs exploded close aboard Adhara and punctured her hull in three places. The ship received jury patching at Espiritu Santo and then steamed to Australia for repairs.

After emerging from dry dock at Wellington, Adhara got underway for the west coast of the United States and on 10 July entered the Mare Island Navy Yard, Vallejo, California. When again ready for action, she sailed on 6 September for the South Pacific. Upon arrival at Nouméa, the cargo ship rejoined ServRon 8 and once more served as an inter-island transport. Her labors took her to the Treasury Islands; the Russell Islands; Emirau, Green Islands; and to various ports in New Guinea, New Hebrides, New Georgia, the Admiralty Islands, Guam, Tinian, Saipan, and Eniwetok. The ship served at Okinawa from 8 to 27 May during the fighting for that island.

== Decommissioning ==
Following Japan's capitulation in mid-August, Adhara arrived at Seattle, Washington, on 30 August and remained in availability there through 27 September. She then got underway for the east coast of the United States. The ship paused in the Norfolk Naval Shipyard to have her naval equipment removed and then continued on to Baltimore, Maryland, where she arrived on 21 November. Adhara was decommissioned on 7 December 1945, and returned to MARCOM on 11 December 1945. Her name was struck from the Navy list on 3 January 1946.

== Final disposition ==
Adhara was laid up in the National Defense Reserve Fleet, James River Group, Virginia.

The ship resumed her former name, G. H. Corliss, and carried it until she was sold for scrap on 26 October 1971, to Hierros Ardes, S.A., a Spanish firm, for $71,520. They took delivery of the vessel almost a month later, on 23 November 1971.

== Awards ==
Adhara won two battle stars for her World War II service.

== Bibliography ==
- "Adhara (AK-71)". Dictionary of American Naval Fighting Ships. Naval History and Heritage Command. 30 August 2016. This article incorporates text from this source, which is in the public domain.
- "Kaiser Permanente No. 2, Richmond CA". ShipbuildingHistory.com. 13 October 2010.
- Priolo, Gary P. (12 March 2021). "USS Adhara (AK-71)". NavSource.
- "G. H. CORLISS". United States Department of Transportation.
- "SS G.H.Corliss".
