= Collinder 135 =

Open cluster in Puppis

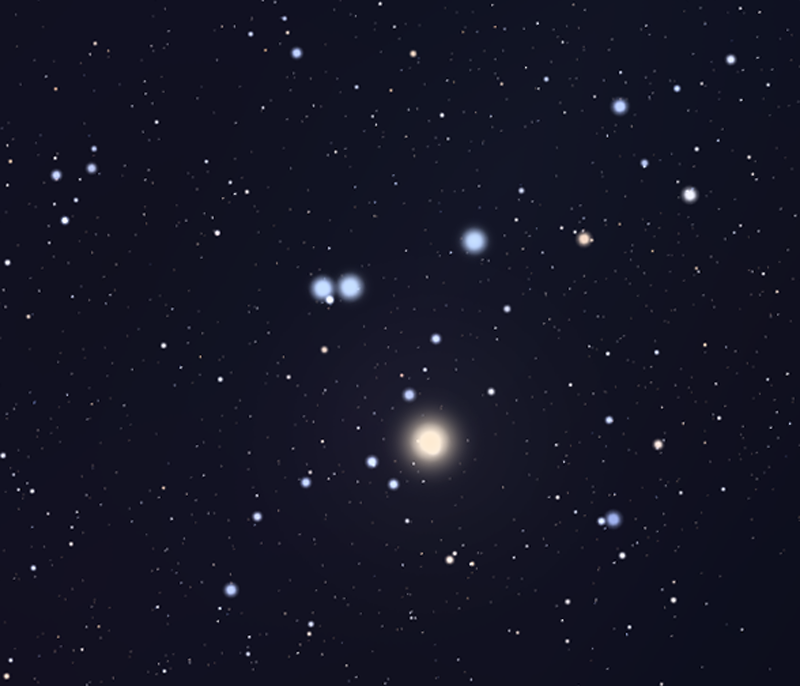
- Simulated image of the Pi Puppis Cluster

Observation data (2000.0 epoch)
- Right ascension: 07^{h} 08^{m}
- Declination: −37° 10′
- Distance: 975 ± 36 ly (299 ± 11 pc)
- Apparent magnitude (V): 2.1
- Apparent dimensions (V): 50'

Physical characteristics
- Estimated age: 36 ± 5 Myr
- Other designations: Pi Puppis Cluster, Cr 135, C 0715-367

Associations
- Constellation: Puppis

Collinder 135, known sometimes as the Pi Puppis Cluster, is an open cluster in the constellation Puppis.

It consists of six stars brighter than 6th magnitude, and a widespread population of fainter stars. It lies in the southern celestial hemisphere near a rich star field. The main component is the star Pi Puppis, which gives to the cluster its common name; it is an orange supergiant with a visual magnitude of 2.71. Two of the 5th magnitude stars are all variables: NV Puppis is a Gamma Cassiopeiae variable, while NW Puppis is a Beta Cephei variable.
