= 11 Canis Majoris =

Star in the constellation Canis Major

Observation data Epoch J2000 Equinox J2000
- Constellation: Canis Major
- Right ascension: 06^{h} 46^{m} 51.09272^{s}
- Declination: −14° 25′ 33.5042″
- Apparent magnitude (V): 5.28

Characteristics
- Spectral type: B8/9III
- B−V color index: −0.024±0.004

Astrometry
Radial velocity (R_{v})	+15.0±4.2 km/s
Proper motion (μ)	RA: −2.853±0.344 mas/yr Dec.: +8.514±0.363 mas/yr
Parallax (π)	3.2263±0.1847 mas
Distance	1,010 ± 60 ly (310 ± 20 pc)
Absolute magnitude (M_{V})	−1.63

Details
Mass	3.9 M_{☉}
Radius	8.8 R_{☉}
Luminosity	465 L_{☉}
Surface gravity (log g)	3.85 cgs
Temperature	13,274 K
Metallicity [Fe/H]	+0.39 dex
Rotational velocity (v sin i)	130 km/s

Other designations
- 11 CMa, BD−14°1584, GC 8879, HD 49229, HIP 32492, HR 2504, SAO 151919

Database references
SIMBAD	data

11 Canis Majoris is a single star in the southern constellation of Canis Major, the eleventh entry in John Flamsteed's catalogue of stars in that constellation. It has a blue-white hue and is visible to the naked eye with an apparent visual magnitude of 5.28. The distance to this star is approximately 1,010 light years from the Sun based on parallax, and it is drifting further away with a radial velocity of around +15 km/s. It has an absolute magnitude of −1.63.

This star has a stellar classification of B8/9III, matching a B-type star that is in the giant stage. It has a high rate of spin with a projected rotational velocity of 130 km/s. The star is radiating 465 times the luminosity of the Sun from its photosphere at an effective temperature of 13,274 K.
