= NGC 2451 =

Open cluster in the constellation Puppis

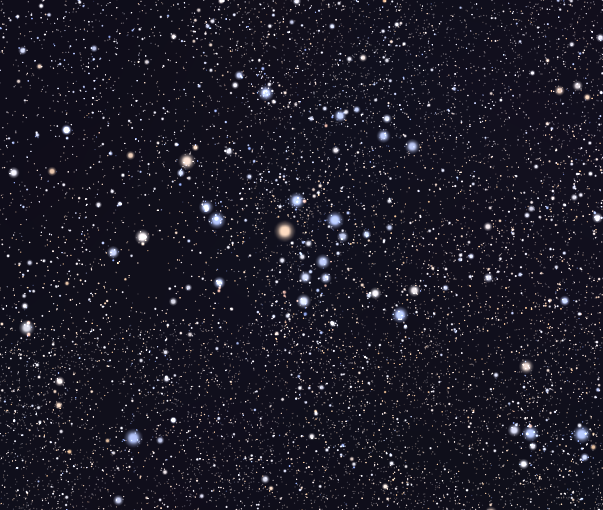
- NGC 2451 (taken from Stellarium)

Observation data (J2000 epoch)
- Right ascension: 07^{h} 45^{m} 24.0^{s}
- Declination: −37° 57′ 00″
- Distance: 600 ly (NGC 2451A), 1,200 ly (NGC 2451B)
- Apparent magnitude (V): 2.8
- Apparent dimensions (V): 50′

Physical characteristics
- Other designations: Cr 161

Associations
- Constellation: Puppis

NGC 2451, also known as the Stinging Scorpion, is an open cluster of stars in the constellation Puppis, probably discovered by Giovanni Battista Hodierna before 1654 and John Herschel in 1835. In 1994, it was postulated that this was actually two open clusters that lie along the same line of sight. This was confirmed in 1996. The respective clusters are labeled NGC 2451 A and NGC 2451 B, and they are located at distances of 600 and 1,200 light-years, respectively.
