= Tau Puppis =

Orange-hued giant star in the southern constellation of Puppis

- Location of τ Puppis (circled)

Observation data Epoch J2000 Equinox ICRS
- Constellation: Puppis
- Right ascension: 06^{h} 49^{m} 56.16846^{s}
- Declination: −50° 36′ 52.4437″
- Apparent magnitude (V): +2.95

Characteristics
- Spectral type: K1 III
- U−B color index: +1.195
- B−V color index: +1.20

Astrometry
Radial velocity (R_{v})	+36.4 km/s
Proper motion (μ)	RA: +34.36 mas/yr Dec.: −69.11 mas/yr
Parallax (π)	18.7577±0.3475 mas
Distance	174 ± 3 ly (53.3 ± 1.0 pc)
Absolute magnitude (M_{V})	−0.80

Orbit
Period (P)	1,066.0±4.0 d
Semi-major axis (a)	7.15±0.25 mas
Eccentricity (e)	0.088±0.045
Inclination (i)	80.20 ± 6.10°
Longitude of the node (Ω)	2.90 ± 6.20°
Periastron epoch (T)	2,420,992.8±94.5 HJD
Argument of periastron (ω) (secondary)	64.00°

Details
Mass	3.19 M_{☉}
Radius	27 R_{☉}
Temperature	4,489±33 K
Rotational velocity (v sin i)	2.2 km/s
Age	540 Myr

Other designations
- Tau Pup, τ Pup, CPD−50°1070, FK5 263, HD 50310, HIP 32768, HR 2553, SAO 234735, PPM 335509

Database references
SIMBAD	data

Tau Puppis, Latinized from τ Puppis, is a star in the southern constellation of Puppis, near the southern constellation boundary with Carina. It is visible to the naked eye with an apparent visual magnitude of +2.95 and is located at a distance of about 182 light-years (56 parsecs) from Earth. The variable radial velocity of this system was detected by H. D. Curtis and H. K. Palmer in 1908, based on observations made at the D. O. Mills Observatory. It is a spectroscopic binary star system, with the presence of the secondary component being revealed by the shifts of absorption lines in the spectrum resulting from the Doppler effect. The two components orbit each other with a period of 1,066.0 days (2.9 years) and a low eccentricity of 0.090.

The primary component of this system has a stellar classification of K1 III. A luminosity class 'III' indicates this has expanded into a giant star after exhausting the supply of hydrogen at its core and evolving away from the main sequence of stars like the Sun. The interferometry-measured angular diameter of this star, after correcting for limb darkening, is 4.49 ± 0.07 mas, which, at its estimated distance, equates to a physical radius of about 27 times the radius of the Sun. It appears to be rotating slowly, with a projected rotational velocity of 2.2 km s^{−1}. This gives a lower bound on the azimuthal velocity of rotation along the star's equator. Tau Puppis is radiating energy from its outer envelope at an effective temperature of around 4,500 K, giving it the orange hue of a cool, K-type star.

This star had the traditional Arabic name Bulqayn or Balqīn (بلقني), the meaning of which is unknown. It was described along with the neighboring bright star Suhayl (Canopus).
