= NGC 2477 =

Open cluster in the constellation Puppis

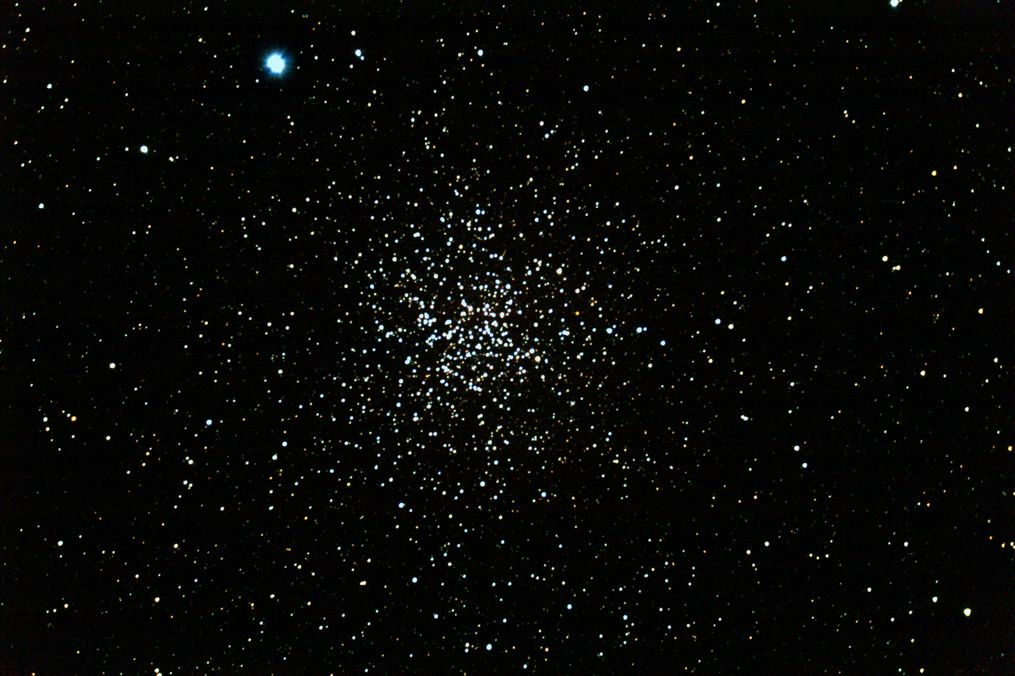
- Open cluster NGC 2477 in Puppis

Observation data (J2000 epoch)
- Right ascension: 07^{h} 52^{m} 09.8^{s}
- Declination: −38° 32′ 00″
- Distance: ~ 3600 ly (~ 1100 pc)
- Apparent magnitude (V): 5.8
- Apparent dimensions (V): 20′

Physical characteristics
- Other designations: Caldwell 71, Cr 165

Associations
- Constellation: Puppis

NGC 2477 is an open cluster of stars in the constellation of Puppis. Alternatively, it is known as Caldwell 71 or the Termite Hole Cluster. It was discovered by Abbé Lacaille in 1751. This cluster contains about 300 stars, and its age has been estimated at 1.0 billion years.

== Visual appearance ==
NGC 2477 is a visually stunning cluster, almost as extensive in the sky as the full moon. It has been called "one of the top open clusters in the sky", like a highly resolved globular cluster without the dense center characteristic of globular clusters. Burnham notes that several observers have remarked on its richness, and that, although it is smaller than M46 (also an open cluster in Puppis), it is richer and more compact.

== Distance ==
Burnham cites several published distances, ranging from 700 parsecs (2,300 ly) to 1,900 parsecs (6,200 ly), where "ly" is the abbreviation for light year.
