= Nu Puppis =

Star in the constellation Puppis

- Location of ν Puppis (circled)

Observation data Epoch J2000 Equinox ICRS
- Constellation: Puppis
- Right ascension: 06^{h} 37^{m} 45.67135^{s}
- Declination: −43° 11′ 45.3602″
- Apparent magnitude (V): 3.173

Characteristics
- Spectral type: B8 III
- U−B color index: −0.397
- B−V color index: −0.113

Astrometry
Radial velocity (R_{v})	+30.9 km/s
Proper motion (μ)	RA: −0.44 mas/yr Dec.: −3.87 mas/yr
Parallax (π)	8.78±0.26 mas
Distance	370 ± 10 ly (114 ± 3 pc)
Absolute magnitude (M_{V})	−2.11

Details
Mass	5.8 M_{☉}
Radius	6.8 (equatorial); 5.8 (polar) R_{☉}
Luminosity	800 L_{☉}
Surface gravity (log g)	2.9 (equatorial); 3.4 (polar) cgs
Temperature	10,000 (equatorial); 13,060 (polar) K
Rotational velocity (v sin i)	225 km/s
Age	234 Myr

Other designations
- Pipit, ν Pup, CPD−43°946, HD 47670, HIP 31685, HR 2451, SAO 218071

Database references
SIMBAD	data

Nu Puppis (ν Puppis), also named Pipit, is a solitary, blue-hued star in the southern constellation of Puppis. It is the fifth-brightest star in Puppis, with an apparent visual magnitude of 3.17. Based upon an annual parallax shift of 8.78 mas as seen from Earth, it is located about 370 light years from the Sun. The system made its closest approach about 3.6 million years ago when it underwent perihelion passage at a distance of roughly 27 light years.

The star has a stellar classification of B8 III, matching a B-type giant. Absorption lines in the spectrum are displaying central quasi-emission peaks, indicating this is a Be shell star with a circumstellar disk of heated gas that is being seen edge-on. ν Puppis is a candidate variable star showing an amplitude of 0.0117 magnitude with a frequency of 0.15292 per day. It is spinning rapidly with a projected rotational velocity of 225 km/s. This rotation is giving the star an oblate shape, with the equator being 17% larger than the poles. Similarly, the effective temperature and surface gravity vary across latitudes. The star's equatorial radius, temperature and surface gravity are estimated at 6.8 R_{☉}, 10,000 K and 2.9 cgs, while the polar radius, temperature and surface gravity are 5.8 R_{☉}, 13,000 K and 3.4 cgs.

Nu Puppis is located within 1° of the precession circle of the southern celestial pole. From around 13300 BCE, it would have been the nearest bright star to the SCP and thus the south pole star, succeeding Sigma Puppis. The SCP would make the closest approach to this star around 12330 BCE and then gradually move towards Eta Columbae, which would succeed Nu Puppis as the south pole star at around 11650 BCE.

Among the Kendayan people of West Kalimantan province, Indonesia, this star is known as Pipit. This name refers to a bird which is called the "rice thief"; pipit is also an English name for a bird, but the Kendayan word may refer to a sparrow or white-rumped munia. The IAU Working Group on Star Names approved the name Pipit for this star on 25 August 2024 and it is now so entered in the IAU Catalog of Star Names.
