= Omicron2 Canis Majoris =

Variable star in constellation Canis Major

ο^{2} Canis Majoris
- Location of ο^{2} CMa (circled)

Observation data Epoch J2000 Equinox ICRS
- Constellation: Canis Major
- Right ascension: 07^{h} 03^{m} 01.47134^{s}
- Declination: −23° 49′ 59.8583″
- Apparent magnitude (V): +2.93 to +3.08

Characteristics
- Spectral type: B3 Ia
- U−B color index: −0.778
- B−V color index: −0.107
- Variable type: α Cyg

Astrometry
Radial velocity (R_{v})	53.88±4.04 km/s
Proper motion (μ)	RA: −1.335 mas/yr Dec.: +3.803 mas/yr
Parallax (π)	0.8715±0.3319 mas
Distance	3,700 ± 820 ly (1,135±250 pc)
Absolute magnitude (M_{V})	−7.3

Details
Mass	24 M_{☉}
Radius	65 R_{☉}
Luminosity	220,000 L_{☉}
Surface gravity (log g)	2.15 cgs
Temperature	15,400 K
Rotational velocity (v sin i)	35 km/s
Age	7.4±1.0 Myr

Other designations
- ο^{2} Canis Majoris, 24 Canis Majoris, CD−23°4797, FK5 270, HD 53138, HIP 33977, HR 2653, SAO 172839

Database references
SIMBAD	data

Omicron^{2} Canis Majoris is a massive variable star in the constellation Canis Major. Its name is a Bayer designation that is Latinized from ο^{2} Canis Majoris, and abbreviated Omicron^{2} CMa or ο^{2} CMa. This star has an apparent visual magnitude around 3, making it visible to the naked eye and the sixth-to-seventh brightest star of the constellation, tied with Zeta Canis Majoris. Based upon a distance modulus of 10.2, it is about 3,600 light-years from Earth. It is drifting further away with a line of sight velocity of +55 km/s. Since 1943, the spectrum of this star has served as one of the stable anchor points by which other stars are classified.

== Characteristics ==
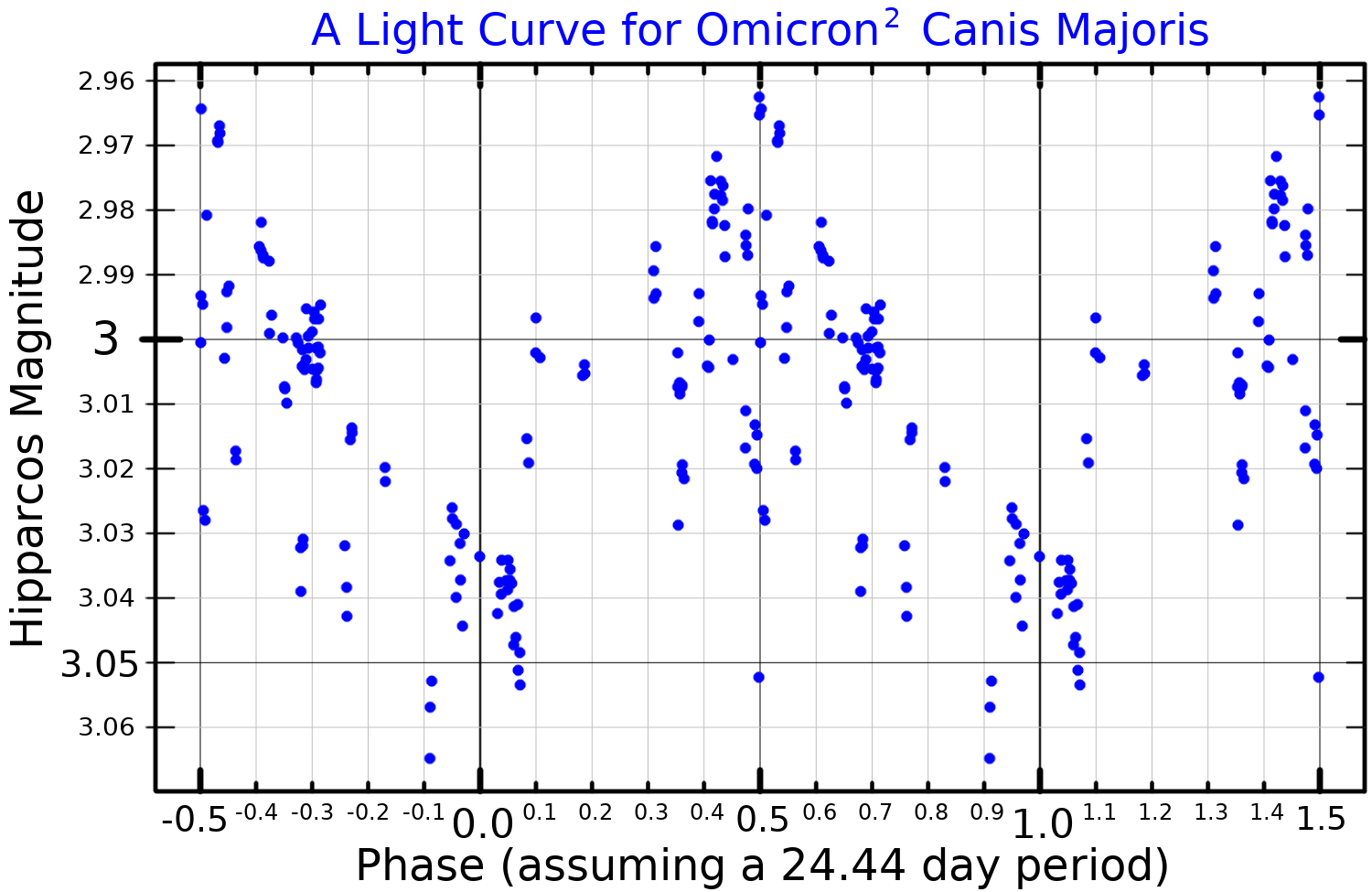
A light curve for Omicron^{2} Canis Majoris, plotted from Hipparcos data

This is a massive supergiant star with a stellar classification of B3 Ia, indicating that, at the age of around 7 million years, it has exhausted the supply of hydrogen at its core and is now undergoing nuclear fusion of helium to generate energy. It has about 24 times the mass of the Sun and 65 times the Sun's radius. In all likelihood, it will end its life as a Type II supernova.

Omicron^{2} Canis Majoris is one of the most luminous stars known, as it radiates about 220,000 times as much luminosity as the Sun from its outer envelope at a temperature of 15,400 K. At this heat, the star is glowing with the blue-white hue of a B-type star. This star is classified as an Alpha Cygni-type variable star that undergoes periodic non-radial pulsations, which cause its brightness to cycle from magnitude +2.93 to +3.08 over a 24.44 day interval. It is losing mass from its stellar wind at the rate of around 2×10^{−9} times the mass of the Sun per year, or the equivalent of the Sun's mass every 500 million years.

While this star lies in the field of view of the open cluster named Collinder 121, it is unlikely to be a member. In fact, its optical neighbor, the orange supergiant ο^{1} Canis Majoris has a much higher likelihood of 23.1% based upon its proper motion being a closer match to the motion of the cluster. Although they are located near each other on the celestial sphere, ο^{1} CMa and ο^{2} CMa are not gravitationally bound to each other as they appear to lie many light years apart.

== Name ==
In the catalogue of stars in the Calendarium of Al Achsasi Al Mouakket, this star was designated Thanih al Adzari (ثاني ألعذاري - thaanii al-aðārii), which was translated into Latin as Secunda Virginum, meaning the second virgin. This star, along with ε CMa (Adhara), δ CMa (Wezen) and η CMa (Aludra), were Al ʽAdhārā (ألعذاري), the Virgins.
