= HD 63032 =

Binary star system in the constellation Puppis

c Puppis
- Location of c Puppis (circled in red)

Observation data Epoch J2000 Equinox ICRS
- Constellation: Puppis
- Right ascension: 07^{h} 45^{m} 15.29613^{s}
- Declination: −37° 58′ 06.9069″
- Apparent magnitude (V): 3.61

Characteristics
- Spectral type: K2.5Ib-IIa（K5IIa） + B9V
- Apparent magnitude (U): 7.06
- Apparent magnitude (B): 5.34
- Apparent magnitude (R): 2.26
- Apparent magnitude (I): 1.26
- Apparent magnitude (J): 0.68
- Apparent magnitude (H): -0.075 ± 0.220
- Apparent magnitude (K): -0.47
- U−B color index: 1.72
- B−V color index: 1.73

Astrometry
Radial velocity (R_{v})	16.83 ± 0.14 km/s
Proper motion (μ)	RA: −10.54 mas/yr Dec.: 5.584 mas/yr
Parallax (π)	2.9460±0.1482 mas
Distance	1,114+66.9 −34.2 ly (341.7+20.5 −19.5 pc)

Details

A
Mass	12.1±1.2 M_{☉}
Radius	274±14 – 301 R_{☉}
Luminosity	15,152 L_{☉}
Temperature	3,781 K
Age	15.8±0.4 Myr

B
Radius	2.0±0.3 R_{☉}
Temperature	10,200 ± 300 K

Other designations
- CD−37 3863, CPD−37 1558, HD 63032, HIP 37819, HR 3017, SAO 198398

Database references
SIMBAD	data

c Puppis, also known as HD 63032 and HR 3017, is a binary star in the constellation Puppis. Its apparent magnitude is of 3.61, making it the eight-brightest star in Puppis. The system is the brightest member of the open cluster NGC 2451, over two magnitudes brighter than every other star in the cluster. As the turnoff point of the cluster is currently around B7, the parameters of the system fit with cluster membership.

The primary component of the system is a red supergiant or bright giant of spectral classification K2.5Ib-IIa. It is twelve times more massive than the Sun, and is estimated 16 million years old. At this evolutionary stage, it has expanded to 280 times the size of the Sun and is 15,000 more luminous. Its surface has cooled to an effective temperature of 3,781 K, giving it a red-orange hue. The secondary component is a late B-type star, about two times the size of the Sun. c Puppis was first discovered to be a binary in 1982, by D. Groote and D. Reimers, based on observations with the International Ultraviolet Explorer.
