= Chi Puppis =

Star in the constellation Puppis

χ Puppis
- Location of χ Puppis (circled)

Observation data Epoch J2000 Equinox ICRS
- Constellation: Puppis
- Right ascension: 07^{h} 57^{m} 40.10678^{s}
- Declination: −30° 20′ 04.4491″
- Apparent magnitude (V): 4.79

Characteristics
- Spectral type: A5 II or A7 III or A2 Vv
- U−B color index: +0.16
- B−V color index: +0.151±0.012

Astrometry
Radial velocity (R_{v})	+30.0±0.5 km/s
Proper motion (μ)	RA: −8.643 mas/yr Dec.: +6.055 mas/yr
Parallax (π)	1.7957±0.1890 mas
Distance	approx. 1,800 ly (approx. 560 pc)
Absolute magnitude (M_{V})	−3.07

Details
Radius	30.39+1.53 −1.70 R_{☉}
Luminosity	3,116±374 L_{☉}
Surface gravity (log g)	2.17 cgs
Temperature	7,823+229 −190 K
Rotational velocity (v sin i)	39.2±0.3 km/s

Other designations
- chi Pup, NSV 3830, CD−29°5236, FK5 1210, GC 10774, HD 65456, HIP 38901, HR 3113, SAO 198636, GSC 07120-02422

Database references
SIMBAD	data

χ Puppis, Latinised as Chi Puppis, is a single star in the southern constellation of Puppis. It has a white hue and is faintly visible to the eye at night with an apparent visual magnitude of 4.79. The star is located at a distance of approximately 1,800 light years from the Sun based on parallax, and is drifting further away with a radial velocity of +30 km/s. O. J. Eggen listed this star as a member of the Hyades Stream based on its space motion.

There has been some disagreement as to the stellar classification of Chi Puppis. In 1962, W. Buscombe classified it as A2Vvar, matching a variable A-type main-sequence star. However, P. S. Conti in 1965 considered that to be a misclassification on the basis of its B-V color index. He considers it of later type A5. In their study of the nearby open cluster NGC 2483, M. P. Fitzgerald and A. F. J. Moffat used the same class, A2Vv. In 1979, Nancy Houk assigned it to class A7 III, indicating it may be an A-type giant star. Finally, R. O. Gray and associates found a class of A5 II, matching a bright giant.

In his star atlas Neue Uranometrie, Friedrich Wilhelm Argelander labelled this star as χ Argo. It was probably labelled as χ by Bayer in the original Uranometria, although Bayer's chart is somewhat fanciful. Nicolas-Louis de Lacaille changed Bayer's designations in Argo Navis and applied χ to the star now called χ Carinae.
