= K Puppis =

Star in the constellation Puppis

k Puppis
- Location of k Puppis (circled)

Observation data Epoch J2000.0 Equinox ICRS
- Constellation: Puppis
- k^{1} Pup
- Right ascension: 07^{h} 38^{m} 49.380^{s}
- Declination: −26° 48′ 06.49″
- Apparent magnitude (V): +4.50
- k^{2} Pup
- Right ascension: 07^{h} 38^{m} 49.869^{s}
- Declination: −26° 48′ 13.80″
- Apparent magnitude (V): +4.429

Characteristics

k^{1}
- Spectral type: B6 V

k^{2}
- Spectral type: B5 IV
- Variable type: SX Ari

Astrometry
| Parallax (π) | 9.41±0.80 mas |
| Distance | 350 ± 30 ly (106 ± 9 pc) |

k^{1}
| Absolute magnitude (M_{V}) | −1.19 |

k^{2}
| Absolute magnitude (M_{V}) | −0.94 |

Details

k^{1}
| Mass | 4.3±0.3 M_{☉} |
| Radius | 3.7+1.2 −0.6 R_{☉} |
| Luminosity | 490 L_{☉} |
| Surface gravity (log g) | 4.24±0.15 cgs |
| Temperature | 13,600±1,200 K |
| Rotational velocity (v sin i) | 114±5 km/s |

k^{2}
| Mass | 6.0±0.3 M_{☉} |
| Radius | 3.0+0.7 −0.3 R_{☉} |
| Luminosity | 1,202 L_{☉} |
| Surface gravity (log g) | 4.10±0.15 cgs |
| Temperature | 18,500±500 K |
| Rotational velocity (v sin i) | 61±5 km/s |

Other designations
- HIP 37229, CD−26 4707, NSV 3673
- k^{1}: HR 2948, HD 61555, SAO 174198
- k^{2}: HR 2949, HD 61556, SAO 174199

Database references
| SIMBAD | k Puppis |
- k^{1}
- k^{2}

k Puppis (k Pup, k Puppis) is a Bayer designation given to an optical double star in the constellation Puppis, the two components being k^{1} Puppis and k^{2} Puppis.

== Bayer designation ==
Note that the Bayer designation for this star is "k" not "kappa" (κ). In Bayer's original Uranometria, k Puppis was listed as ρ (rho) Navis. When Lacaille broke apart the large constellation Argo Navis into Carina, Puppis, and Vela, he re-designated the stars with Greek letters in a single sequence across all three constellations. Additionally, Lacaille used Latin letters for many additional stars. κ (kappa) is in the constellation of Vela and so there is no kappa in Puppis. The confusion also extends to the proper name Markab which properly applies to κ Velorum (and other stars) but which has also been used for k Puppis when it is called κ Puppis.

== Description ==
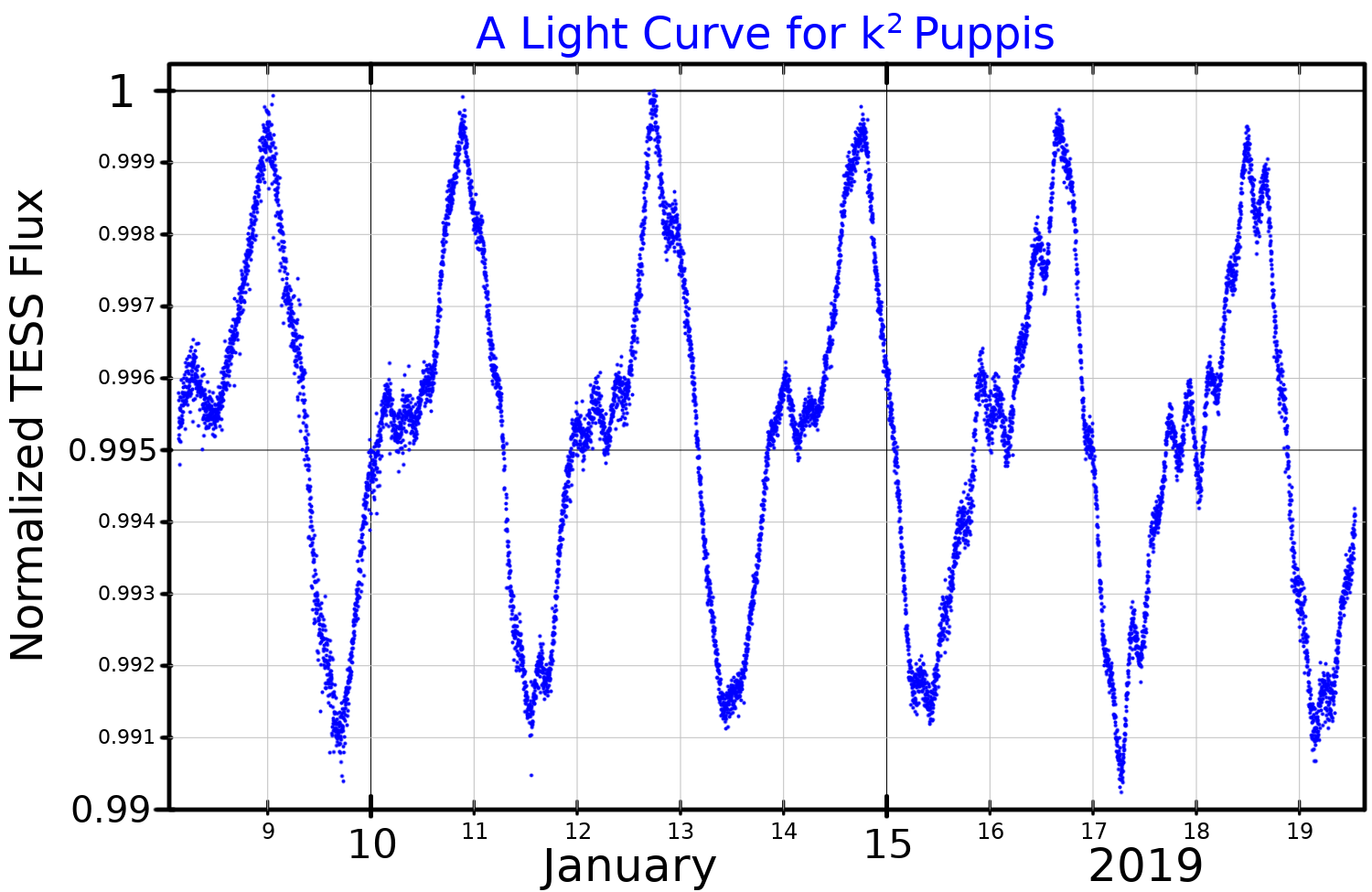
A light curve for k^{2} Puppis, plotted from TESS data

Both k^{1} Puppis and k^{2} Puppis are bright blue B-type stars of nearly equal brightness, +4.50 and +4.62, respectively. To the naked eye, the pair has a combined magnitude of +3.80. On the sky, the two stars are separated by approximately 9.9 seconds of arc along PA 318°. The optical pair can be distinguished easily with a small telescope. The component k^{1} Puppis is a binary star system in its own right, while k^{2} Puppis is a variable star. Each star within the k Puppis optical pair is between 450 and 470 light years from Earth.

k Puppis is listed in the General Catalogue of Variable Stars as a suspected variable star, but the range and type are not stated. The International Bulletin of Variable Stars has since published research showing that k^{2} Puppis is the variable component. It is an SX Arietis variable with a period of 1.9093 days which is also the rotational period of the star. The total amplitude is 0.015 apparent magnitude.

k^{2} Puppis is a chemically peculiar star with a strong magnetic field. It is classified as a He-weak star and in addition to a deficit of helium in its spectrum, it shows an overabundance of many iron peak and rare earth elements. All of its spectral lines show variability, probably due to variations in the chemical makeup of its atmosphere as it rotates.
