= Well (Chinese constellation) =

Mansion in Chinese astronomy

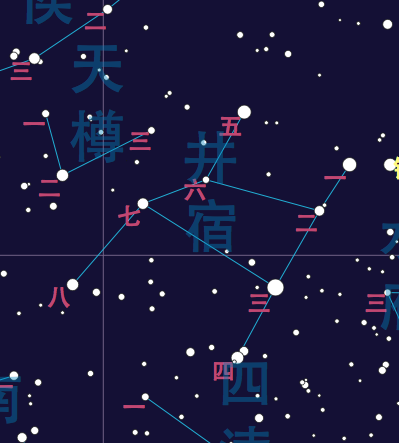
Jǐng Xiù map

The Well mansion (井宿, pinyin: Jǐng Xiù; Japanese: chichiri-boshi) is one of the Twenty-eight mansions of the Chinese constellations. It is part of the southern mansions associated with the Vermilion Bird, one of the Four Symbols of Chinese astronomy. The Well mansion is located in the constellation Gemini in Western astronomy and includes: Mu Geminorum (Tejat Posterior) - 井宿 (Jǐng Xiù yī), the first star of Well, Nu Geminorum - 井宿二(Jǐng Xiù èr), Xi Geminorum - 井宿三 (Jǐng Xiù sān), Epsilon Geminorum (Mebsuta) - 井宿四 (Jǐng Xiù sì), Zeta Geminorum (Mekbuda) - 井宿五 (Jǐng Xiù wǔ), Lambda Geminorum - 井宿六 (Jǐng Xiù liù), Kappa Geminorum - 井宿七 (Jǐng Xiù qī), Iota Geminorum - 井宿八 (Jǐng Xiù bā)

== Asterisms ==
English name	Chinese name	European constellation	Number of stars
Well	井	Gemini	8
Battle Axe	鉞	Gemini	1
South River	南河	Canis Minor	3
North River	北河	Gemini	3
Celestial Wine Cup	天樽	Gemini	3
Five Feudal Kings	五諸侯	Gemini	5
Accumulated Water	積水	Auriga	1
Pile of Firewood	積薪	Gemini	1
Irrigation Official	水府	Orion	4
Water Level	水位	Canis Minor/Cancer	4
Four Channels	四瀆	Monoceros/Gemini	4
Market for Soldiers	軍市	Canis Major	6
Wild Cockerel	野雞	Canis Major	1
Grandfather	丈人	Columba	2
Son	子	Columba	2
Grandson	孫	Columba	2
Palace Gate	闕丘	Monoceros	2
Celestial Wolf	天狼	Canis Major	1
Bow and Arrow	弧矢	Canis Major/Puppis	9
Old Man	老人	Carina	1
