= Puppis =

Constellation in the southern celestial hemisphere

- Constellation
- List of stars in Puppis
- Abbreviation: Pup
- Genitive: Puppis
- Pronunciation: /ˈpʌpɪs/, genitive the same
- Symbolism: the Poop Deck
- Right ascension: 7.5^{h}
- Declination: −30°
- Quadrant: SQ2
- Area: 673 sq. deg. (20th)
- Main stars: 9
- Bayer/Flamsteed stars: 76
- Stars brighter than 3.00^{m}: 1
- Stars within 10.00 pc (32.62 ly): 7
- Brightest star: ζ Pup (Naos) (2.25^{m})
- Nearest star: 2MASS J0729−3954
- Messier objects: 3
- Meteor showers: Pi Puppids; Zeta Puppids; Puppid-Velids
- Bordering constellations: Monoceros; Pyxis; Vela; Carina; Pictor; Columba; Canis Major; Hydra
- Visible at latitudes between +40° and −90°. Best visible at 21:00 (9 p.m.) during the month of February.

Puppis ("stern") is a constellation in the southern sky. It was originally part of the traditional constellation of Argo Navis (Argo is the ship of Jason and the Argonauts), which was divided into three parts, the other two being Carina (the keel and hull) and Vela (the sails). Puppis is the largest of the three constellations in square degrees. It is one of the 88 modern constellations recognized by the International Astronomical Union.

== History ==
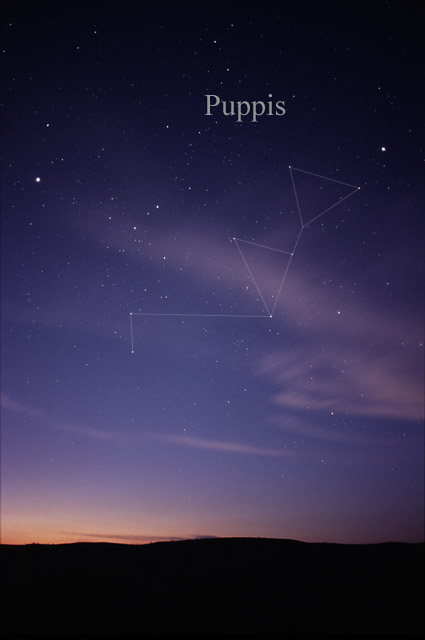
The constellation Puppis as it can be seen by the naked eye

The constellation of Argo Navis is recorded in Greek texts, derived from ancient Egypt around 1000 BC. According to Plutarch, its equivalent in Egyptian astronomy was the "Boat of Osiris".

As Argo Navis was roughly 28% larger than the next largest constellation, Hydra, it was sub-divided into three sections in 1752 by the French astronomer Nicolas Louis de Lacaille, including Puppis, which he referred to as "Argûs in puppi". Despite the division, Lacaille kept a single set of Bayer designations for the whole constellation, Argo. Therefore, Carina has the α, β, and ε, Vela has γ and δ, Puppis has ζ, and so on. In 1844, John Herschel proposed complete dividing Argo Navis in accordance with Lacaille's divisions. However, the constellation continued to be used into the 20th century, and officially received a three-letter designation alongside its divisions in 1922. Puppis, along with Carina and Vela, was included in the list of modern IAU constellations in 1930.

== Features ==
=== Named stars ===
Multiple stars in Puppis have received proper names that have been formally adopted by the International Astronomical Union. Two exceptions are Ahadi and Bulqayn, which are not catalogued by the IAU.

Designation	Name	Origin	Meaning
ζ Puppis	Naos	Greek	ship
ν Puppis	Pipit	Kendayan	pipit
ξ Puppis	Azmidi	Greek	little shield
π Puppis	Ahadi	Arabic	having much promise
ρ Puppis	Tureis	Arabic	little shield
τ Puppis	Bulqayn	Arabic	unknown
HD 48265	Nosaxa	Mocoví	springtime
HD 61005	Moth	English	moth
WASP-121	Dilmun	Sumerian	historical civilisation
WASP-161	Tislit	Amazigh	a lake in the Atlas Mountains

The brightest star in the constellation, Zeta Puppis, is a massive supergiant that is one of the hottest and intrinsically brightest stars visible to the naked eye. It is a runaway star and a rapid rotator.

The second brightest member is Pi Puppis, a double star that is the brightest member of the Collinder 135 open cluster. The primary component is a K-type giant.

RS Puppis is a particularly luminous cepheid variable star that is embedded in a reflection nebula. The star has a six-week long regular cycle of brightness variation. The pulses from this variation produces light echoes off the surrounding nebula, providing an accurate distance estimate of 6,500 light years.

=== Planetary systems ===
Several extrasolar planet systems have been found around stars in the constellation Puppis, including:

- On July 1, 2003, a planet was found orbiting the star HD 70642. This planetary system is much like Jupiter with a wide, circular orbit and a long-period.
- On May 17, 2006, HD 69830 was discovered to have three Neptune-mass planets, the first multi-planetary system without any Jupiter-like or Saturn-like planets. The star also hosts an asteroid belt at the region between middle planet to outer planet.
- On June 21, 2007, the first extrasolar planet found in the open cluster NGC 2423, was discovered around the red giant star NGC 2423-3. The planet is at least 10.6 times the mass of Jupiter and orbits at 2.1 AU distance.
- On September 22, 2008, two Jupiter-like planets were discovered around HD 60532. HD 60532 b has a minimum mass of 1.03 M_{J} and orbits at 0.759 AU and takes 201.3 days to complete the orbit. HD 60532 c has a minimum mass of 2.46 M_{J} and orbits at 1.58 AU and takes 604 days to complete the orbit.
- In 2023, Astronomers detected two ice giant type exoplanets (both with a mass of tens of earths) having a collision event around the 300 million year old star designated as 2MASS J08152329-3859234.

=== Deep-sky objects ===
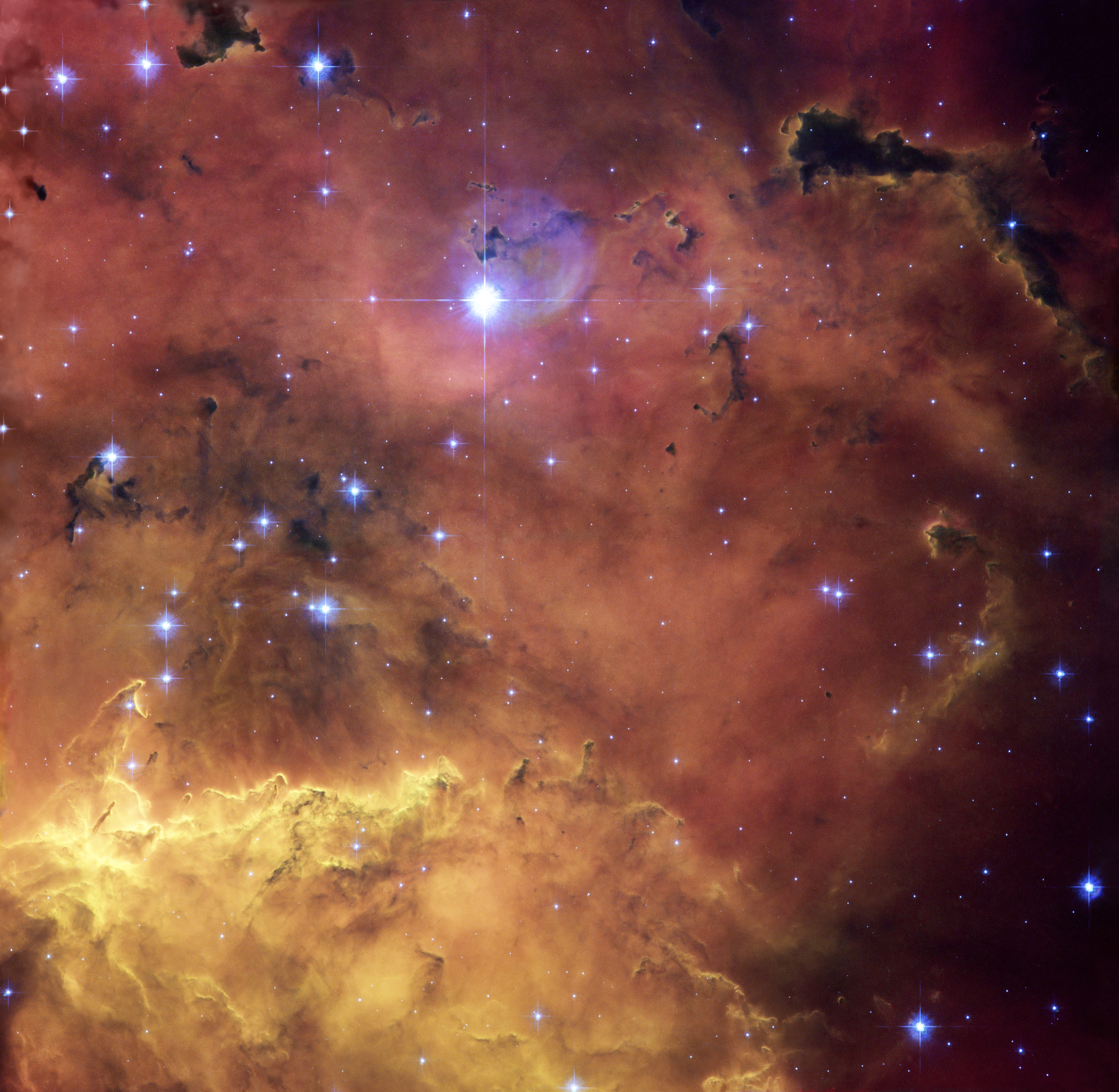
The NGC 2467 star-forming region

As the Milky Way runs through Puppis, there are many open clusters in the constellation. Fortunately, absorption out to the rim is low in this direction, making this one of the brightest stretches of the galaxy. M46 and M47 are two open clusters in the same binocular field. M47 can be seen with the naked eye under dark skies, and its brightest stars are 6th magnitude. Messier 93 (M93) is another open cluster somewhat to the south. NGC 2451 is a very bright open cluster containing the star c Puppis, and the nearby NGC 2477 is a good target for small telescopes. The star Pi Puppis is the main component of a bright group of stars known as Collinder 135.

M46 is a circular open cluster with an overall magnitude of 6.1 at a distance of approximately 5400 light-years from Earth. The planetary nebula NGC 2438 is superimposed; it is approximately 2900 light-years from Earth. M46 is classified as a Shapley class f and a Trumpler class III 2 m cluster. This means that it is a rich cluster that appears distinct from the star field, despite not being at its center. The cluster's stars, numbering between 50 and 100, have a moderate range in brightness.

The largest emission nebula in the sky, the Gum Nebula, extends 36° across the southeast constellation boundary with Vela. Rather than an H II region, this is an old supernova remnant that now spans a thousand light years. Puppis A is a 3,700 year old supernova remnant that spans 100 light years. It is a source of X-ray emission.

== See also ==
- Puppis in Chinese astronomy

Puppis stars within ~10 pc
Designation	Distance	Mass	Class
CD-44 3045 A	26.2 ly	0.269 M_{☉}	M3
CD-44 3045 B	26.2 ly	0.266 M_{☉}	M3
SCR J0740-4257	26.0 ly	0.16 M_{☉}	M4.5 V
LAWD 25	29.8 ly	6.2 M_{☉}	DZA6.6
LP 783-2	29.9 ly	0.1 M_{☉}	M6.5 V
L 674-15	26.5 ly	0.268 M_{☉}	M3.5 V
UPM J0815-2344	32.3 ly	0.258 M_{☉}	?

== Sources ==
- Levy, David H. (2005), Deep Sky Objects, Prometheus Books, ISBN 1-59102-361-0
- Ian Ridpath and Wil Tirion (2017). Stars and Planets Guide, Collins, London. ISBN 978-0-00-823927-5. Princeton University Press, Princeton. ISBN 978-0-691-17788-5.
- Richard Hinckley Allen, Star Names, Their Lore and Legend, New York, Dover.
