= List of stars in Puppis =

This is the list of notable stars in the constellation Puppis, sorted by decreasing brightness.

This constellation's Bayer designations (Greek-letter star names) were given while it was still considered part of the constellation of Argo Navis. After Argo Navis was broken up into Carina, Vela, and Puppis, these Greek-letter designations were kept, so that Puppis does not have a full complement of Greek-letter designations. For example, since Argo Navis's alpha star went to Carina, there is no Alpha Puppis.

Name	B	F	G.	Var	HD	HIP	RA	Dec	vis. mag.	abs. mag.	Dist. (ly)	Sp. class	Notes
ζ Pup	ζ		248		66811	39429	08^{h} 03^{m} 35.07^{s}	−40° 00′ 11.5″	2.21	−5.95	1399	O5Iaf	Naos, Suhail Hadar, Muliphein; α Cyg variable
π Pup	π		82		56855	35264	07^{h} 17^{m} 08.56^{s}	−37° 05′ 51.0″	2.71	−4.92	1094	K3Ib	Ahadi
ρ Pup	ρ	15	253		67523	39757	08^{h} 07^{m} 32.70^{s}	−24° 18′ 16.0″	2.83	1.41	63	F2mF5IIp	Tureis; δ Sct variable; Fm star
τ Pup	τ		39		50310	32768	06^{h} 49^{m} 56.14^{s}	−50° 36′ 51.8″	2.94	−0.80	183	K0III...	Bulqayn
ν Pup	ν		20		47670	31685	06^{h} 37^{m} 45.67^{s}	−43° 11′ 45.3″	3.17	−2.39	423	B8III SB	Pipit
σ Pup	σ		99		59717	36377	07^{h} 29^{m} 13.88^{s}	−43° 18′ 06.8″	3.25	−0.51	184	K5III SB	
ξ Pup	ξ	7	191		63700	38170	07^{h} 49^{m} 17.66^{s}	−24° 51′ 35.2″	3.34	−4.74	1347	G6Ia	Azmidi, Asmidiske, Azmidiske
c Pup	c		175		63032	37819	07^{h} 45^{m} 15.30^{s}	−37° 58′ 07.0″	3.62	−4.52	1387	K4III	
HD 64440	a		213		64440	38414	07^{h} 52^{m} 13.05^{s}	−40° 34′ 32.9″	3.71	−1.41	345	G5III...	
3 Pup	l	3	157		62623	37677	07^{h} 43^{m} 48.47^{s}	−28° 57′ 17.4″	3.94	−5.30	2280	A2Iab	B[e] star
HD 63922	P		199		63922	38164	07^{h} 49^{m} 14.30^{s}	−46° 22′ 23.6″	4.10	−4.80	1964	B0III	
11 Pup	j	11	222		65228	38835	07^{h} 56^{m} 51.56^{s}	−22° 52′ 48.5″	4.20	−1.74	502	F7/F8II	
HD 64760	J		218		64760	38518	07^{h} 53^{m} 18.16^{s}	−48° 06′ 10.6″	4.22	−4.65	1940	B0.5Ib	
ο Pup	ο		183		63462	38070	07^{h} 48^{m} 05.17^{s}	−25° 56′ 13.8″	4.40	−5.00	2470	B1IV:nne	Be star
16 Pup		16	256		67797	39906	08^{h} 09^{m} 01.64^{s}	−19° 14′ 42.0″	4.40	−1.41	472	B5V	
L_{2} Puppis	L_{2}		73		56096	34922	07^{h} 13^{m} 32.23^{s}	−44° 38′ 25.9″	5.10	0.50	198	M5e	
HD 69142	h^{2}		279		69142	40326	08^{h} 14^{m} 02.89^{s}	−40° 20′ 51.8″	4.42	−0.47	310	K1II/III	
NS Pup	h^{1}		267	NS	68553	40091	08^{h} 11^{m} 21.50^{s}	−39° 37′ 06.8″	4.44	−4.36	1874	K4.5Ib	Irregular (Ld) variable
HD 70060	q		289		70060	40706	08^{h} 18^{m} 33.39^{s}	−36° 39′ 34.3″	4.44	2.16	93	A4m...	
HD 60532			108		60532	36795	07^{h} 34^{m} 03.18^{s}	−22° 17′ 45.8″	4.46	2.41	84	F6V	has two planets (b & c)
V Pup			233	V	65818	38957	07^{h} 58^{m} 14.44^{s}	−49° 14′ 41.7″	4.47	−3.29	1164	B1Vp + B2	β Lyr eclipsing variable
QW Pup	I		71	QW	55892	34834	07^{h} 12^{m} 33.74^{s}	−46° 45′ 34.4″	4.49	2.86	69	F0IV	γ Dor variable
QZ Pup	b		214	QZ	64503	38455	07^{h} 52^{m} 38.65^{s}	−38° 51′ 46.2″	4.49	−1.98	640	B2V	Ellipsoidal variable
k^{1} Pup	k^{1}		133		61555	37229	07^{h} 38^{m} 49.88^{s}	−26° 48′ 14.0″	4.50	−1.92	454	B6V	component of the k Puppis system
HD 61330	f		127		61330	37096	07^{h} 37^{m} 22.12^{s}	−34° 58′ 06.9″	4.53	−0.67	358	B8IV/V	
HD 65810			232		65810	39095	07^{h} 59^{m} 52.06^{s}	−18° 23′ 56.9″	4.61	0.29	238	A1V	
k^{2} Pup	k^{2}		134		61556		07^{h} 38^{m} 49.80^{s}	−26° 48′ 13.0″	4.62	−1.81	462	B5IV	component of the k Puppis system
1 Pup		1	155		62576	37648	07^{h} 43^{m} 32.40^{s}	−28° 24′ 39.4″	4.63	−2.75	976	M1 III	
HD 64740			216		64740	38500	07^{h} 53^{m} 03.64^{s}	−49° 36′ 47.1″	4.63	−2.09	720	B1.5Vp	
NV Pup	υ^{1}		83	NV	57150	35363	07^{h} 18^{m} 18.40^{s}	−36° 44′ 02.3″	4.65	−2.42	847	B2V+...	γ Cas variable
HD 59890			100		59890	36514	07^{h} 30^{m} 42.61^{s}	−30° 57′ 44.2″	4.65	−4.00	1753	G2Ib...	
HD 60863	p		119		60863	36917	07^{h} 35^{m} 22.94^{s}	−28° 22′ 09.4″	4.65	0.46	225	B8V	
PU Pup	m		128	PU	61429	37173	07^{h} 38^{m} 18.05^{s}	−25° 21′ 53.2″	4.69	−1.45	551	B8IV	β Lyr variable
Q Pup	Q		196		63744	38089	07^{h} 48^{m} 20.25^{s}	−47° 04′ 39.1″	4.69	0.48	227	K0III	
19 Pup		19	263		68290	40084	08^{h} 11^{m} 16.32^{s}	−12° 55′ 37.3″	4.72	0.95	185	K0III	
HD 68601			268		68601	40096	08^{h} 11^{m} 25.90^{s}	−42° 59′ 14.2″	4.73	−6.04	4657	A7Ib	
HD 56456			78		56456	35020	07^{h} 14^{m} 38.14^{s}	−48° 16′ 18.9″	4.75	−0.43	354	B8/B9V	
χ Pup	χ		225		65456	38901	07^{h} 57^{m} 40.11^{s}	−30° 20′ 04.5″	4.76	−3.47	1442	A7III	
MX Pup	r		274	MX	68980	40274	08^{h} 13^{m} 29.52^{s}	−35° 53′ 58.4″	4.78	−2.61	979	B2ne	γ Cas variable
KQ Pup			107	KQ	60414	36773	07^{h} 33^{m} 47.97^{s}	−14° 31′ 26.0″	4.82	−5.25	3361	M2Iab+B0Ve	Irregular (Lc) variable
A Pup	A		67		54893	34495	07^{h} 08^{m} 51.08^{s}	−39° 39′ 20.4″	4.83	−1.98	751	B3IV/V	
HD 70555	w		294		70555	40945	08^{h} 21^{m} 23.03^{s}	−33° 03′ 15.7″	4.83	−2.22	838	K2/K3III	
HD 61831	d^{1}		143		61831	37297	07^{h} 39^{m} 27.35^{s}	−38° 18′ 29.0″	4.84	−1.39	574	B3V	
HD 59612			97		59612	36431	07^{h} 29^{m} 51.41^{s}	−23° 01′ 27.5″	4.85	−5.13	3228	A6Ib/II	
OU Pup	L_{1}		72	OU	56022	34899	07^{h} 13^{m} 13.37^{s}	−45° 10′ 57.1″	4.87	1.14	181	Ap	α^{2} CVn variable
H Pup	H		61		53811	34059	07^{h} 03^{m} 53.66^{s}	−49° 35′ 03.3″	4.92	1.07	192	A4IV	
HD 51799			47		51799	33357	06^{h} 56^{m} 15.99^{s}	−48° 43′ 16.2″	4.94	−2.62	1062	M1III	
HD 61772			140		61772	37379	07^{h} 40^{m} 23.21^{s}	−15° 15′ 49.9″	4.98	−1.60	676	K3III	
HD 50235			37		50235	32855	06^{h} 50^{m} 52.35^{s}	−34° 22′ 02.4″	4.99	−2.23	906	K2/K3III	
20 Pup		20	269		68752	40259	08^{h} 13^{m} 19.98^{s}	−15° 47′ 17.6″	4.99	−2.89	1230	G5Ib/II	
HR 3079			212		64379	38423	07^{h} 52^{m} 15.80^{s}	−34° 42′ 21.7″	5.01	3.73	59	F3/F5V	
HR 2770			80		56779	35226	07^{h} 16^{m} 49.42^{s}	−36° 35′ 33.5″	5.03	−2.31	959	B3V	
4 Pup		4	167		62952	37891	07^{h} 45^{m} 56.88^{s}	−14° 33′ 49.8″	5.03	0.73	236	F2V	
HR 2998			159		62644	37606	07^{h} 42^{m} 57.16^{s}	−45° 10′ 18.4″	5.04	3.13	79	G5IV	Originally called T Pup by Lacaille
HR 2462	V/Y		21		47973	31765	06^{h} 38^{m} 37.63^{s}	−48° 13′ 12.8″	5.05	−0.58	436	G8III	Called V by Lacaille, Y in later catalogues, not V or Y Pup the variables
HD 60584	n		111		60584	36817	07^{h} 34^{m} 18.67^{s}	−23° 28′ 25.2″	5.77	2.74	95	F6V	
HD 52092	t		49		52092	33558	06^{h} 58^{m} 25.11^{s}	−34° 06′ 42.2″	5.07	−1.77	760	B4IV/V	
HR 3035			185		63465	38010	07^{h} 47^{m} 25.00^{s}	−38° 30′ 40.2″	5.07	−2.83	1240	B2IV/V	
N Pup	N		228		65551	38872	07^{h} 57^{m} 18.43^{s}	−44° 06′ 35.6″	5.08	−2.90	1283	B2.5IV	
12 Pup		12	230		65699	39023	07^{h} 59^{m} 05.72^{s}	−23° 18′ 37.4″	5.09	−1.82	786	G8II	
OS Pup			276	OS	69081	40321	08^{h} 13^{m} 58.32^{s}	−36° 19′ 20.3″	5.09	−2.70	1177	B2V:	γ Cas variable
NW Pup	υ^{2}		84	NW	57219	35406	07^{h} 18^{m} 38.19^{s}	−36° 44′ 33.9″	5.11	−1.93	836	A0V	β Cep variable
HR 2719			68		55526	34670	07^{h} 10^{m} 47.50^{s}	−48° 55′ 57.3″	5.12	0.21	313	K2III	
HR 3002	W		162		62713	37664	07^{h} 43^{m} 41.83^{s}	−40° 56′ 00.0″	5.12	1.02	215	K1III	Not W Puppis the Mira variable
HR 2548	X		38		50223	32765	06^{h} 49^{m} 54.62^{s}	−46° 36′ 52.42″	5.14	3.13	82	F5.5V	Not X Pup the δ Cep variable
O Pup	O		231		65685	38917	07^{h} 57^{m} 51.73^{s}	−45° 34′ 39.9″	5.14	0.32	300	K2III	
9 Pup		9	205		64096	38382	07^{h} 51^{m} 46.34^{s}	−13° 53′ 49.9″	5.16	4.05	54	G2V	HR 3064, Gl 291
6 Pup		6	190		63697	38211	07^{h} 49^{m} 41.17^{s}	−17° 13′ 41.2″	5.17	0.72	253	K3III	
HR 3283			295		70556	40943	08^{h} 21^{m} 21.05^{s}	−36° 29′ 03.1″	5.18	−3.31	1630	B2IV-V+...	
C Pup	C		59		53704	34081	07^{h} 04^{m} 02.81^{s}	−42° 20′ 14.8″	5.20	0.27	315	Am	
HR 3037			187		63578	38020	07^{h} 47^{m} 31.51^{s}	−46° 36′ 30.6″	5.22	−3.33	1672	B1V	
HR 3140			234		65925	39061	07^{h} 59^{m} 28.43^{s}	−39° 17′ 48.6″	5.22	1.41	189	F3V	
F Pup	F		87		57240	35393	07^{h} 18^{m} 33.52^{s}	−39° 12′ 37.1″	5.24	−0.55	469	A0V	
MZ Pup			250	MZ	66888	39487	08^{h} 04^{m} 16.19^{s}	−32° 40′ 29.4″	5.25	−4.03	2345	M2II	Probably irregular (Lc) variable
HD 49591	x		31		49591	32537	06^{h} 47^{m} 21.41^{s}	−37° 55′ 46.8″	5.27	0.24	331	B8/B9V	
HR 2384			16		46273	30953	06^{h} 29^{m} 49.13^{s}	−50° 14′ 20.3″	5.28	1.71	169	F2V	
E Pup	E		70		55719	34802	07^{h} 12^{m} 15.82^{s}	−40° 29′ 55.6″	5.30	−0.32	434	A3p...	
HR 3043			188		63660	38146	07^{h} 49^{m} 01.70^{s}	−24° 54′ 44.1″	5.31	0.35	365	G1.5IIIFe-0.5	
HR 3315			302		71176	41260	08^{h} 25^{m} 03.76^{s}	−24° 02′ 46.5″	5.32	−0.64	506	K4/K5III	
HR 3183			252		67456	39734	08^{h} 07^{m} 18.05^{s}	−20° 33′ 15.6″	5.33	−2.54	1221	A3Ib/II	
171 G. Pup			171		63077	37853	07^{h} 45^{m} 35.18^{s}	−34° 10′ 35.6″	5.36	4.45	50	G0V	
HR 3114			227		65460	38846	07^{h} 56^{m} 57.81^{s}	−43° 30′ 01.5″	5.36	−2.32	1120	B2.5V	
HD 59635	y		98		59635	36363	07^{h} 29^{m} 05.71^{s}	−38° 48′ 43.6″	5.41	−0.75	556	B3V	
HR 2981			150		62226	37450	07^{h} 41^{m} 15.83^{s}	−38° 32′ 00.9″	5.41	−0.98	617	B3V	
OW Pup	z		115	OW	60606	36778	07^{h} 33^{m} 51.05^{s}	−36° 20′ 18.2″	5.42	−2.54	1273	B2Vne	γ Cas variable
HR 3085			215		64572	38497	07^{h} 53^{m} 03.51^{s}	−36° 21′ 49.6″	5.44	−1.39	756	K1IIICN...	
HR 3326			309		71459	41323	08^{h} 25^{m} 51.92^{s}	−42° 09′ 11.2″	5.45	−1.53	813	B3V	
5 Pup		5	180		63336	38048	07^{h} 47^{m} 56.78^{s}	−12° 11′ 34.4″	5.48	3.08	99	F5+...	
HR 3091			217		64802	38593	07^{h} 54^{m} 11.01^{s}	−35° 52′ 38.3″	5.48	−1.47	801	B2V	
V336 Pup			246	V336	66624	39360	08^{h} 02^{m} 44.79^{s}	−41° 18′ 35.5″	5.52	−0.35	486	Ap Si	α^{2} CVn variable
HR 3324			308		71377	41395	08^{h} 26^{m} 42.01^{s}	−12° 32′ 04.3″	5.52	0.95	268	K1/K2III	
18 Pup		18	262		68146	40035	08^{h} 10^{m} 39.98^{s}	−13° 47′ 57.7″	5.53	3.77	73	F7V	
HR 2863			93		59256	36258	07^{h} 27^{m} 59.17^{s}	−29° 09′ 21.2″	5.55	−1.03	674	B9Vsp...	
HD 53705			60		53705	34065	07^{h} 03^{m} 57.40^{s}	−43° 36′ 32.3″	5.56	4.51	53	G3V...	
HR 3279			292		70442	40944	08^{h} 21^{m} 21.22^{s}	−20° 04′ 44.4″	5.58	−0.12	450	A3V	
HR 3266			287		70002	40678	08^{h} 18^{m} 17.39^{s}	−35° 27′ 06.1″	5.59	0.08	413	K2III	
HR 2994			156		62578	37623	07^{h} 43^{m} 12.00^{s}	−36° 03′ 00.4″	5.60	−0.72	598	B5V	
HR 3052			197		63852	38200	07^{h} 49^{m} 35.43^{s}	−33° 17′ 20.2″	5.61	−1.02	691	M0III	
V390 Pup			161	V390	62747	37751	07^{h} 44^{m} 34.17^{s}	−24° 40′ 26.7″	5.62	−3.16	1863	B2II	Algol variable
HR 3068			204		64152	38375	07^{h} 51^{m} 43.05^{s}	−21° 10′ 25.5″	5.62	1.00	274	K0III	
HR 2771			81		56813	35181	07^{h} 16^{m} 15.47^{s}	−46° 46′ 28.6″	5.64	−0.99	692	K4III	
HR 2899			105		60341	36732	07^{h} 33^{m} 19.55^{s}	−19° 24′ 44.5″	5.64	0.88	292	K0III	
HR 2988			154		62412	37590	07^{h} 42^{m} 48.15^{s}	−26° 21′ 04.5″	5.64	0.59	333	K1III	
V378 Pup			122	V378	60855	36981	07^{h} 36^{m} 03.90^{s}	−14° 29′ 34.0″	5.66	−2.87	1655	B2/3V(n)	Be star
HR 3194			257		67880	39943	08^{h} 09^{m} 28.54^{s}	−16° 14′ 56.1″	5.66	−1.59	921	B4V	
HR 3308			301		71141	41242	08^{h} 24^{m} 55.20^{s}	−23° 09′ 13.7″	5.67	−0.76	631	A1III/IV	
MY Pup	y^{3}		142	MY	61715	37174	07^{h} 38^{m} 18.21^{s}	−48° 36′ 05.2″	5.68	−5.26	5015	F4Iab	δ Cep variable, Y in Lacaille
PT Pup			125	PT	61068	37036	07^{h} 36^{m} 41.04^{s}	−19° 42′ 08.5″	5.69	−2.89	1698	B2II	β Cep variable
HD 61391	y^{2}		130		61391	37043	07^{h} 36^{m} 43.93^{s}	−48° 49′ 48.6″	5.69	−0.23	497	B9V	Y in Lacaille
10 Pup		10	206		64238	38427	07^{h} 52^{m} 18.88^{s}	−14° 50′ 46.2″	5.69	−2.11	1185	F2IV/V	
HR 3281			293		70523	40990	08^{h} 21^{m} 54.66^{s}	−17° 35′ 10.7″	5.71	0.99	286	K0III	
PR Pup			77	PR	56455	35029	07^{h} 14^{m} 46.03^{s}	−46° 50′ 58.8″	5.72	0.14	425	A0p	α^{2} CVn variable
HD 61878	d^{2}		144		61878	37322	07^{h} 39^{m} 43.83^{s}	−38° 08′ 21.6″	5.73	−0.64	612	B5V	
G Pup	G		15		45572	30591	06^{h} 25^{m} 43.66^{s}	−48° 10′ 36.7″	5.76	−0.82	675	B9V	
HD 61899	d^{3}		145		61899	37329	07^{h} 39^{m} 47.88^{s}	−38° 15′ 38.4″	5.76	−1.91	1116	B3III	
HR 3242			278		69123	40344	08^{h} 14^{m} 13.29^{s}	−35° 29′ 24.3″	5.77	1.56	227	K1III	
HR 2873			96		59550	36362	07^{h} 29^{m} 04.92^{s}	−31° 27′ 22.4″	5.78	−1.95	1144	B2IV	
HR 2913			116		60666	36848	07^{h} 34^{m} 34.83^{s}	−27° 00′ 44.8″	5.78	0.87	313	K1III	
HD 61641	e		138		61641	37223	07^{h} 38^{m} 43.90^{s}	−36° 29′ 48.6″	5.78	−1.58	964	B3III	
D Pup	D		66		54475	34339	07^{h} 07^{m} 07.09^{s}	−40° 53′ 35.9″	5.80	−1.26	842	B3V	
HR 3007			164		62781	37710	07^{h} 44^{m} 09.74^{s}	−36° 03′ 45.8″	5.80	2.61	142	F0IV	
HR 2769			79		56733	35202	07^{h} 16^{m} 31.86^{s}	−38° 19′ 08.2″	5.81	−0.78	679	B4V	
QS Pup			200	QS	63949	38159	07^{h} 49^{m} 12.87^{s}	−46° 51′ 27.9″	5.82	−3.03	1918	B1.5IV	β Cep variable
HR 3160			244		66598	39380	08^{h} 03^{m} 04.17^{s}	−32° 27′ 48.9″	5.83	−0.18	518	K2/K3III	
HR 2900			106		60345	36721	07^{h} 33^{m} 09.78^{s}	−24° 42′ 38.8″	5.84	0.98	306	A3III	
M Pup	M		85		57197	35347	07^{h} 18^{m} 04.26^{s}	−43° 59′ 12.4″	5.86	−0.54	621	B8II/III	
HD 60585	n		112		60585		07^{h} 34^{m} 19.10^{s}	−23° 28′ 29.0″	5.87				
V392 Pup			176	V392	63215	37915	07^{h} 46^{m} 10.56^{s}	−37° 56′ 01.3″	5.87	−0.57	632	B5V	Be star
HR 3291			298		70761	41074	08^{h} 22^{m} 49.94^{s}	−26° 20′ 53.6″	5.88			F2Iab	
HR 3011			174		62893	37752	07^{h} 44^{m} 34.20^{s}	−37° 56′ 34.6″	5.89	−0.46	608	B8V	
HR 3071			208		64225	38267	07^{h} 50^{m} 23.88^{s}	−50° 30′ 33.7″	5.89	1.39	259	K2III	
HR 2856			91		59026	36143	07^{h} 26^{m} 42.47^{s}	−34° 08′ 26.5″	5.90	−1.47	973	B4V	
HR 3023			178		63271	37995	07^{h} 47^{m} 12.56^{s}	−22° 31′ 10.3″	5.90	−1.51	988	B1/B2V	
HR 3154			241		66358	39251	08^{h} 01^{m} 37.53^{s}	−37° 17′ 01.4″	5.90	−0.41	595	A3IV	
HR 2960			141		61774	37364	07^{h} 40^{m} 13.53^{s}	−19° 39′ 39.2″	5.92	−0.80	720	K0III	
HD 41742			2		41742	28790	06^{h} 04^{m} 40.17^{s}	−45° 04′ 46.4″	5.93	3.77	87	F6V	A component of the quadruple HD 41742/41700 star system
HR 2558			40		50445	32938	06^{h} 51^{m} 42.45^{s}	−36° 13′ 48.5″	5.94	2.23	180	A3V	
V363 Pup			69	V363	55718	34817	07^{h} 12^{m} 25.83^{s}	−36° 32′ 39.8″	5.94	−1.27	903	B4V	Slowly pulsating B variable
V397 Pup			195	V397	63786	38167	07^{h} 49^{m} 14.65^{s}	−35° 14′ 35.9″	5.94	0.11	478	B9V	Algol variable
HR 2759			76		56410	35054	07^{h} 14^{m} 57.15^{s}	−41° 25′ 35.1″	5.95	−0.19	552	B4III/IV	
					59499	36345	07^{h} 28^{m} 51.16^{s}	−31° 50′ 54.3″	5.95	−0.31	582	B3V+...	
HD 69830			285		69830	40693	08^{h} 18^{m} 23.78^{s}	−12° 37′ 47.2″	5.95	5.45	41	K0V	has three Neptune-mass planets (b, c, & d), asteroid belt
HR 3320			305		71267	41328	08^{h} 25^{m} 55.60^{s}	−14° 55′ 47.1″	5.96	0.91	333	A3m...	
V438 Pup			307	V438	71302	41250	08^{h} 24^{m} 57.22^{s}	−42° 46′ 11.5″	5.97	−3.92	3105	B3V	Algol variable
HR 2860			92		59136	36236	07^{h} 27^{m} 42.94^{s}	−22° 51′ 33.1″	5.98	−1.18	881	B5III	
HR 3137			235		65904	39014	07^{h} 59^{m} 01.81^{s}	−45° 12′ 57.1″	5.98	−1.61	1076	B4V	
V468 Pup	d^{4}		146	V468	61925	37345	07^{h} 39^{m} 57.99^{s}	−37° 34′ 45.9″	5.99	−2.10	1353	B4III	Be star
HR 3148			239		66210	39122	08^{h} 00^{m} 14.72^{s}	−48° 58′ 53.8″	6.01	0.70	377	A2V	
HR 3316			303		71196	41282	08^{h} 25^{m} 19.02^{s}	−21° 02′ 46.0″	6.01	3.36	111	F2/F3V	
HR 3020			177		63118	37823	07^{h} 45^{m} 18.05^{s}	−43° 45′ 09.2″	6.02	−1.15	886	B6IV	
HR 3101			223		65211	38732	07^{h} 55^{m} 46.60^{s}	−43° 50′ 42.2″	6.02	−1.08	856	B6V	
HR 2868			94		59438	36395	07^{h} 29^{m} 21.98^{s}	−14° 59′ 53.1″	6.05	3.39	111	F5V	
QU Pup			210	QU	64365	38370	07^{h} 51^{m} 40.36^{s}	−42° 53′ 17.6″	6.05	−2.61	1762	B2IV	β Cep variable
2 Pup A		2	166		62864	37843	07^{h} 45^{m} 29.14^{s}	−14° 41′ 25.7″	6.06	0.85	359	A6/A7	
HR 3239			275		69080	40341	08^{h} 14^{m} 11.04^{s}	−32° 08′ 26.6″	6.07	−2.35	1575	B2V	
NO Puppis			312		71487	41361	08^{h} 26^{m} 17.74^{s}	−39° 03′ 32.3″	6.07	−0.30	613	B9IV/V	
HR 2685			63		54153	34253	07^{h} 06^{m} 02.26^{s}	−38° 22′ 58.4″	6.09	−0.44	660	G0III	
HR 3111			226		65442	38845	07^{h} 56^{m} 57.81^{s}	−42° 24′ 23.5″	6.09	−0.58	703	K3III	
HR 2913			113		60646	36807	07^{h} 34^{m} 12.86^{s}	−33° 27′ 48.9″	6.11	1.39	287	A9IV	
HR 3051			194		63822	38246	07^{h} 50^{m} 05.67^{s}	−19° 31′ 24.8″	6.11	−2.69	1874	K1III	
HR 3241			277		69082	40324	08^{h} 13^{m} 58.71^{s}	−36° 20′ 26.9″	6.11	−2.18	1482	B2IV/V	
14 Pup		14	247		66834	39524	08^{h} 04^{m} 41.42^{s}	−19° 43′ 41.4″	6.12	−2.30	1575	B3III	
HR 3276			291		70302	40876	08^{h} 20^{m} 27.36^{s}	−22° 55′ 28.8″	6.12	−0.58	712	G8/K0III	
PY Pup			240	PY	66255	39153	08^{h} 00^{m} 28.97^{s}	−48° 52′ 18.4″	6.13	−2.20	1509	A0p	α^{2} CVn variable
22 Pup		22	296		70673	41067	08^{h} 22^{m} 46.87^{s}	−13° 03′ 16.8″	6.13	0.63	411	K0III	
V368 Pup			90	V368	58634	35960	07^{h} 24^{m} 47.36^{s}	−37° 17′ 28.5″	6.14	−0.50	694	A8V	δ Sct variable
T Pup			189	T	63640	38074	07^{h} 48^{m} 08.55^{s}	−40° 39′ 08.3″	6.14	−0.19	600	M2III	Classed as not variable
HR 3092			220		64876	38635	07^{h} 54^{m} 39.93^{s}	−34° 50′ 48.1″	6.14	−0.45	678	K4III	
HR 2677			62		53952	34200	07^{h} 05^{m} 32.05^{s}	−34° 46′ 40.1″	6.15	2.42	182	F2V	
HR 3177			251		67243	39617	08^{h} 05^{m} 44.89^{s}	−33° 34′ 10.0″	6.15	−3.94	3396	G1Ib	
HR 3253			282		69511	40485	08^{h} 15^{m} 58.83^{s}	−35° 54′ 11.5″	6.15	−2.67	1895	K2III	
HR 3286			297		70612	40947	08^{h} 21^{m} 24.18^{s}	−39° 37′ 14.6″	6.15	2.01	219	A4V	
HR 2475			23		48383	32007	06^{h} 41^{m} 14.17^{s}	−40° 20′ 59.5″	6.16	−1.40	1058	B4V	
HR 2976			149		62082	37465	07^{h} 41^{m} 23.53^{s}	−22° 20′ 12.3″	6.16	−0.95	860	M0/M1III	
V339 Pup			30	V339	49336	32434	06^{h} 46^{m} 12.16^{s}	−37° 46′ 31.3″	6.19	−2.05	1449	B3Vne	Be star
HR 2955			137		61642	37202	07^{h} 38^{m} 32.53^{s}	−38° 46′ 53.0″	6.20	0.79	393	G8III	
					60325	36736	07^{h} 33^{m} 22.19^{s}	−14° 20′ 17.9″	6.21	−2.12	1509	B2II	
HR 3118			229		65598	38879	07^{h} 57^{m} 20.08^{s}	−47° 53′ 26.6″	6.21	−1.24	1009	B5V	
HR 3199			260		67977	39920	08^{h} 09^{m} 10.19^{s}	−35° 27′ 18.2″	6.21	0.82	389	G8III	
HR 3251			281		69445	40476	08^{h} 15^{m} 52.57^{s}	−30° 55′ 33.3″	6.22	1.07	349	G6:III+...	
HR 2612			48		51825	33451	06^{h} 57^{m} 17.61^{s}	−35° 30′ 25.9″	6.23	3.05	141	F5V	
HR 2626			51		52362	33590	06^{h} 58^{m} 41.74^{s}	−45° 46′ 03.3″	6.23	0.66	424	A0V	
HR 3042			186		63655	38184	07^{h} 49^{m} 28.81^{s}	−13° 21′ 10.5″	6.23	−2.57	1874	B8/B9II	
HR 2594			45		51266	33139	06^{h} 54^{m} 02.31^{s}	−50° 36′ 43.7″	6.24	2.59	175	K0/K1III	
HR 2187			7		42448	29129	06^{h} 08^{m} 34.64^{s}	−44° 21′ 22.4″	6.26	−0.55	751	B8II	
					59235	36264	07^{h} 28^{m} 01.92^{s}	−26° 50′ 20.4″	6.26	−0.28	664	K4III	
HR 2604			46		51682	33394	06^{h} 56^{m} 45.70^{s}	−35° 20′ 28.9″	6.27	−0.21	644	K2III	
V376 Pup			110	V376	60559	36728	07^{h} 33^{m} 13.17^{s}	−40° 03′ 30.7″	6.27	−0.30	672	B8IV (p Si)	β Lyr variable
HR 3205			264		68242	39974	08^{h} 09^{m} 47.70^{s}	−42° 38′ 27.0″	6.27	−1.12	979	B+...	
HR 2211			9		42834	29304	06^{h} 10^{m} 39.93^{s}	−45° 16′ 55.2″	6.28	−0.26	663	A0V	
HR 2482			26		48543	32091	06^{h} 42^{m} 16.39^{s}	−38° 23′ 55.7″	6.28	1.48	298	A+...	
PX Pup			221	PX	65183	38792	07^{h} 56^{m} 22.72^{s}	−30° 17′ 04.3″	6.28	−1.59	1221	M5/M6III	Irregular variable
HR 3166			249		66812	39420	08^{h} 03^{m} 29.62^{s}	−42° 56′ 54.0″	6.28	−0.61	780	G8II	
V436 Pup			300	V436	70946	41107	08^{h} 23^{m} 16.93^{s}	−38° 17′ 09.8″	6.28	−1.88	1399	M2III	Lb variable
HR 2488			27		48797	32208	06^{h} 43^{m} 23.35^{s}	−39° 11′ 35.1″	6.30	0.17	549	A8:+...	
HR 2794			86		57299	35463	07^{h} 19^{m} 13.70^{s}	−33° 43′ 37.7″	6.31	−0.45	734	K2/K3III	
					63291	37939	07^{h} 46^{m} 33.45^{s}	−37° 46′ 21.0″	6.31	0.00	597	K3III	
QY Pup				QY	63302	38031	07^{h} 47^{m} 38.53^{s}	−15° 59′ 26.5″	6.31	−2.91	2280	K3Iab/b	Semiregular variable (SRd)
HR 3155			242		66435	39299	08^{h} 02^{m} 06.13^{s}	−37° 03′ 00.3″	6.31	−0.70	823	M3III	
NP Pup			44	NP	51208	33189	06^{h} 54^{m} 26.68^{s}	−42° 21′ 56.2″	6.32	−1.79	1364	C3II	Irregular (Lb) variable
HR 2829			89		58420	35893	07^{h} 23^{m} 58.34^{s}	−35° 50′ 16.3″	6.32	−0.33	697	B5V	
HR 3057			201		63948	38183	07^{h} 49^{m} 28.32^{s}	−44° 45′ 04.4″	6.32	1.30	329	K0III	
21 Pup		21	284		69665	40604	08^{h} 17^{m} 23.14^{s}	−16° 17′ 06.3″	6.32	−0.78	858	A1V	
OX Pup			182	OX	63401	37982	07^{h} 47^{m} 05.77^{s}	−39° 19′ 51.7″	6.33	−0.28	685	Ap Si	α^{2} CVn variable
HR 2933			126		61227	37089	07^{h} 37^{m} 16.93^{s}	−23° 46′ 31.5″	6.34	−9.14	40750	F0Ib	
					63696	38206	07^{h} 49^{m} 39.98^{s}	−14° 05′ 07.3″	6.34	−0.96	939	K5III	
HR 3074			209		64287	38355	07^{h} 51^{m} 20.34^{s}	−43° 05′ 42.9″	6.34	−2.09	1583	B2IV-V	
HD 41700			1		41700	28764	06^{h} 04^{m} 28.51^{s}	−45° 02′ 13.9″	6.35	4.22	87	F7.5V	A component of the quadruple HD 41742/41700 star system
HR 2895			104		60312	36657	07^{h} 32^{m} 22.28^{s}	−35° 57′ 40.3″	6.35	−0.43	739	B8V	
HR 3142			236		66005	39035	07^{h} 59^{m} 12.31^{s}	−49° 58′ 36.7″	6.35	−1.63	1283	B2IV-V	
					66885	39514	08^{h} 04^{m} 32.65^{s}	−25° 41′ 58.9″	6.35	−0.66	823	K5/M0III	
PQ Pup			258	PQ	67888	39866	08^{h} 08^{m} 37.65^{s}	−37° 40′ 52.5″	6.36	−2.32	1772	B3V	γ Cas variable
8 Pup		8	203		64077	38372	07^{h} 51^{m} 40.88^{s}	−12° 49′ 09.8″	6.37	2.00	244	F3IV	
HR 3143			237		66006	39038	07^{h} 59^{m} 13.57^{s}	−49° 58′ 25.6″	6.37	−0.68	838	B2IV-V	
HR 3190			255		67751	39876	08^{h} 08^{m} 43.58^{s}	−20° 21′ 47.4″	6.37	−1.87	1449	A3III	
HR 2945			131		61453	37128	07^{h} 37^{m} 45.03^{s}	−38° 00′ 38.1″	6.38	0.18	566	K4III	
HR 3027			179		63323	38037	07^{h} 47^{m} 45.21^{s}	−16° 00′ 52.1″	6.38	−2.95	2397	K5II/III	
					69002	40291	08^{h} 13^{m} 41.05^{s}	−33° 34′ 10.4″	6.38	1.07	377	K2III	
HR 2641			54		52703	33774	07^{h} 00^{m} 49.74^{s}	−33° 27′ 56.6″	6.39	0.85	418	G8II/III	
HR 3019			170		63112	37951	07^{h} 46^{m} 44.72^{s}	−12° 40′ 31.1″	6.39	−0.96	962	B9III	
					60951	36986	07^{h} 36^{m} 07.42^{s}	−22° 09′ 37.7″	6.40	−0.23	691	K1II	
HD 61589			135		61589	37289	07^{h} 39^{m} 24.20^{s}	−16° 50′ 50.1″	6.40	−0.15	667	K3III	
HR 3233			272		68862	40220	08^{h} 12^{m} 51.56^{s}	−37° 55′ 28.1″	6.40	0.22	561	A3V	
HR 2984			153		62318	37461	07^{h} 41^{m} 21.72^{s}	−44° 37′ 55.8″	6.41	−1.31	1140	B7IV/V	
HR 2563			41		50621	32918	06^{h} 51^{m} 32.56^{s}	−48° 17′ 33.8″	6.42	−0.22	695	K2/K3III	
HR 3001			160		62712	37666	07^{h} 43^{m} 42.93^{s}	−38° 12′ 06.9″	6.42	0.17	580	B8IV	
HR 3219			265		68450	40063	08^{h} 11^{m} 01.69^{s}	−37° 17′ 32.6″	6.42	−2.96	2451	B0III	
					69904	40639	08^{h} 17^{m} 46.15^{s}	−36° 04′ 03.3″	6.42	−4.18	4289	M0III + A3/5	
					61750	37375	07^{h} 40^{m} 21.02^{s}	−11° 45′ 09.1″	6.43	0.34	538	K2	
HR 3060			202		64042	38316	07^{h} 51^{m} 00.08^{s}	−24° 31′ 42.6″	6.43	0.48	505	B9.5V	
HR 3261			286		69879	40656	08^{h} 17^{m} 58.26^{s}	−30° 00′ 13.3″	6.43	0.65	466	K0III	
HR 2658			57		53253	33909	07^{h} 02^{m} 15.48^{s}	−43° 24′ 13.9″	6.44	0.95	408	A0V	
HR 3275			290		70235	40787	08^{h} 19^{m} 29.52^{s}	−34° 35′ 24.5″	6.44	−0.55	815	B8Ib/II	
HR 3317			304		71231	41306	08^{h} 25^{m} 39.37^{s}	−17° 26′ 21.9″	6.44	−0.21	698	K1III	
HR 3069			207		64181	38292	07^{h} 50^{m} 42.52^{s}	−44° 34′ 47.9″	6.45	0.27	561	G6III	
					64974	38686	07^{h} 55^{m} 13.87^{s}	−30° 55′ 03.8″	6.45	−1.54	1294	K4III	
					63399	37996	07^{h} 47^{m} 14.62^{s}	−36° 04′ 25.2″	6.46	0.87	428	K1III	
					65638	38925	07^{h} 57^{m} 54.79^{s}	−40° 47′ 03.7″	6.46	0.24	573	K0III	
HR 2579			43		50860	33015	06^{h} 52^{m} 47.14^{s}	−43° 58′ 32.2″	6.47	0.90	424	B8V	
					54179	34177	07^{h} 05^{m} 16.39^{s}	−50° 21′ 36.5″	6.47	−0.44	787	K3III	
HR 2178			4		42168	28988	06^{h} 07^{m} 01.83^{s}	−45° 05′ 29.8″	6.48	1.19	372	K1III	
HR 2204			8		42683	29185	06^{h} 09^{m} 23.43^{s}	−49° 33′ 46.8″	6.48	2.58	196	F8V	
V420 Pup				V420	67698	39834	08^{h} 08^{m} 19.36^{s}	−23° 37′ 04.0″	6.49		1299	B3III/IV	Be star
HD 63734			193		63734	38209	07^{h} 49^{m} 40.80^{s}	−19° 30′ 19.7″	6.49	0.96	417	K2III	
HR 2956			139		61672	37293	07^{h} 39^{m} 26.98^{s}	−26° 51′ 47.1″	6.50	−0.50	819	B6V	
					67408	39730	08^{h} 07^{m} 16.03^{s}	−17° 22′ 07.7″	6.50	0.05	637	K1III	
R Puppis			148	R	62058	37415	07^{h} 40^{m} 52.60^{s}	−31° 39′ 40.2″	6.56			G2Ia-0	
2 Pup B		2			62863	37842	07^{h} 45^{m} 28.74^{s}	−14° 41′ 10.0″	7.03	1.57	402	A0/A1V	
HD 70642					70642	40952	08^{h} 21^{m} 28.14^{s}	−39° 42′ 19.5″	7.18	4.89	94	G6V	has a planet (b)
HD 50499					50499	32970	06^{h} 52^{m} 02^{s}	−33° 54′ 56″	7.22		154	GIV	has a planet (b) and unconfirmed planet (c)
HD 55696					55696	34801	07^{h} 12^{m} 15.0^{s}	−38° 10′ 28″	7.9		235	G0V	has a planet (b)
HD 48265					48265	31895	06^{h} 40^{m} 01.73^{s}	−48° 32′ 31.0″	8.07	3.36	285	G5IV/V	Nosaxa, has a planet (b)
NGC 2423-3							07^{h} 37^{m} 09^{s}	−13° 54′ 24″	9.45	0.03	2500		individual star of open cluster NGC 2423, has a planet (b)
HIP 38594						38594	07^{h} 54^{m} 11.0^{s}	−25° 18′ 11″	9.7		58	M0	has two planets (b & c)
WASP-121							07^{h} 10^{m} 24.0^{s}	−39° 05′ 51″	10.4		881	F6V	has a transiting planet (b)
WASP-122							07^{h} 13^{m} 12.0^{s}	−42° 24′ 35″	11.0			G4	has a transiting planet (b)
WASP-168							06^{h} 26^{m} 59.0^{s}	−46° 49′ 17″	11.0			F9V	has a transiting planet (b)
WASP-161							08^{h} 25^{m} 21.1^{s}	−11° 30′ 03″	11.1			F6	Tislit; has a transiting planet (b)
WASP-23							06^{h} 44^{m} 31.0^{s}	−42° 45′ 43″	12.7			K1V	has a transiting planet (b)
Table legend: Name = Proper name; B = Bayer designation; F or/and G. = Flamsteed designation or Gould designation; Var = Variable-star designation; HD = Henry Draper Catalogue designation number; HIP = Hipparcos Catalogue designation number; RA = Right ascension for the Epoch/Equinox J2000.0; Dec = Declination for the Epoch/Equinox J2000.0; vis. mag. = visual magnitude (m or m_{v}), also known as apparent magnitude; abs. mag. = absolute magnitude (M_{v}); Dist. (ly) = Distance in light-years from Earth; Sp. class = Spectral class of the star in the stellar classification system; Notes = Common name(s) or alternate name(s); comments; notable properties [for example: multiple star status, range of variability if it is a variable star, exoplanets, etc.]

== See also ==
- List of stars by constellation
