= P Puppis =

The Bayer designations p Puppis and P Puppis are distinct. Due to technical limitations, both designations link here. For the star

- p Puppis, see HD 60863
- P Puppis, see HD 63922

== See also ==
- π Puppis
- ρ Puppis
- PT Puppis
- PU Puppis
