= Q Puppis =

The Bayer designations q Puppis and Q Puppis are distinct. Due to technical limitations, both designations link here. For the star

- q Puppis, see HD 70060
- Q Puppis, see HD 63744

== See also ==
- QW Puppis
- QZ Puppis
