= Turais =

Turais may refer to:

- The traditional name for the star Iota Carinae
- The traditional name for the star Rho Puppis
- Ambassador Turais, a character from Pixar's Elio
