= Y Puppis =

The Bayer designations Y Puppis (or Y Pup) and y Puppis (or y Pup) are distinct and refer to four different stars in the constellation Puppis:

- Y Puppis (HR 2462), also referred to as V Puppis by Lacaille
- y^{1} Puppis (HD 59635), usually just called y Puppis
- y^{2} Puppis (HD 61391)
- y^{3} Puppis (MY Puppis)
