= Z Puppis =

The Bayer designations Z Puppis and z Puppis are distinct and refer to two different stars in the constellation Puppis:

- Z Puppis, a variable star
- z Puppis, (OW Puppis, HD 60606, 115 G. Puppis), a γ Cas variable

== See also ==
- Zeta Puppis
