= T Puppis =

The Bayer designations T Puppis (or T Pup) and t Puppis (or t Pup) are distinct and refer to two different stars in the constellation Puppis:

- T Puppis (HD 63640, TYC 7649-108-1, HIP 38074, HR 3041, 189 G. Puppis), a non-variable star, although T Puppis is a variable star designation
- t Puppis (HR 2619, HD 52092, HIP 33558, TYC 7097-2515-1)
