= 1 Puppis =

Star in the constellation Puppis

- Location of 1 Puppis (circled)

Observation data Epoch J2000 Equinox ICRS
- Constellation: Puppis
- Right ascension: 07^{h} 43^{m} 32.38668^{s}
- Declination: −28° 24′ 39.1887″
- Apparent magnitude (V): 4.59

Characteristics
- Evolutionary stage: AGB
- Spectral type: M1III
- U−B color index: +1.94
- B−V color index: +1.63

Astrometry
| Radial velocity (R_{v}) | +32.40 km/s |
| Proper motion (μ) | RA: −13.782 mas/yr Dec.: +29.646 mas/yr |
| Parallax (π) | 4.1384±0.1143 mas |
| Distance | 790 ± 20 ly (242 ± 7 pc) |
| Absolute magnitude (M_{V}) | −2.24 |

Details
| Radius | 84 R_{☉} |
| Luminosity | 1,585 - 1,644 L_{☉} |
| Surface gravity (log g) | 0.32 cgs |
| Temperature | 3,986±170 K |
| Metallicity [Fe/H] | −0.19 dex |
| Rotational velocity (v sin i) | 1.0 km/s |

Other designations
- 1 Pup, NSV 3708, CD−28°4767, GC 10409, HD 62576, HIP 37648, HR 2993, SAO 174391, CCDM J07435-2825A, WDS J07435-2825A, GSC 06552-03227

Database references
| SIMBAD | data |

1 Puppis is a single star in the southern constellation of Puppis. It lies in the northern part of the constellation at a distance of about 790 ly, east of Aludra in Canis Major and just north of the white supergiant, 3 Puppis. This object is visible to the naked eye as a faint, red-hued star with an apparent visual magnitude of 4.59. It is moving further from the Earth with a heliocentric radial velocity of +32.4 km/s.

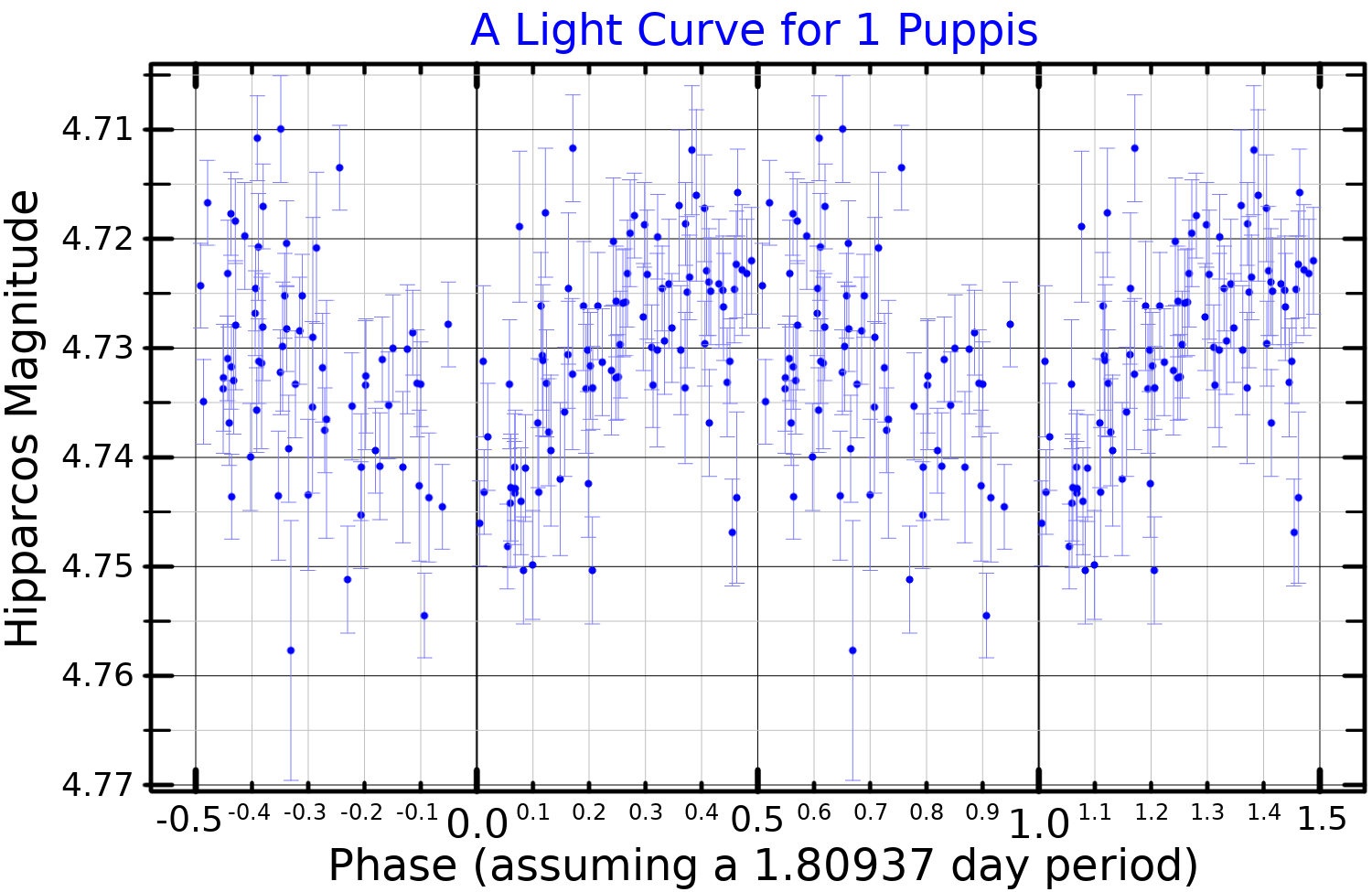
A light curve for 1 Puppis, plotted from Hipparcos data

The Hipparcos data for 1 Puppis shows low amplitude (0.007 magnitude) variability with a period of 1.8094 days. The International Variable Star Index classifies the 1 Puppis as a star with starspots that cause the brightness to change as it rotates, and which varies in visual magnitude from 4.58 to 4.63.

This is a red giant star with a stellar classification of M1 III, having exhausted the hydrogen at its core and evolved away from the main sequence. The star is radiating 1,509 times the luminosity of the Sun from its enlarged photosphere at an effective temperature of 4,111 K. It has several visual companions: component B, of magnitude 13.7 and angular separation of 26″, C, of magnitude 9.21 and separation 78.8″, and D, of magnitude 10.84 and separation from C of 1.3″. Component B is a background object. Components C and D form the binary star HD 62557 and have a similar parallax and proper motion to 1 Puppis.
