= KQ Puppis =

Triple star in the constellation Puppis

- KQ Puppis is the bright red star on the right, with Messier 47 to its left (east) and Messier 46 even further east.

Observation data Epoch J2000 Equinox ICRS
- Constellation: Puppis
- Right ascension: 07^{h} 33^{m} 47.96383^{s}
- Declination: −14° 31′ 26.0026″
- Apparent magnitude (V): +4.97 (4.82 - 5.17)

Characteristics

KQ Pup A
- Evolutionary stage: Red supergiant
- Spectral type: M2Iab
- U−B color index: +0.29
- B−V color index: +1.41
- Variable type: Slow irregular variable

KQ Pup Ba
- Evolutionary stage: Main sequence
- Spectral type: B2V

Astrometry
| Radial velocity (R_{v}) | 34.56±0.22 km/s |
| Proper motion (μ) | RA: -7 mas/yr Dec.: +4 mas/yr |
| Parallax (π) | 1.242±0.044 mas |
| Distance | 2,630+98 −91 ly (805+30 −28 pc) |

Orbit
| Primary | KQ Pup Ba |
| Name | KQ Pup Bb |
| Period (P) | 17.2596 days |
| Semi-major axis (a) | 0.3 au |
| Eccentricity (e) | ≥0.236 |
| Inclination (i) | ~90° |

Orbit
| Primary | KQ Pup A |
| Name | KQ Pup B |
| Period (P) | 9,534.2±6.7 days |
| Semi-major axis (a) | 25.26+1.15 −1.10 au |
| Eccentricity (e) | 0.61±0.01 |
| Inclination (i) | 73.91+1.14 −0.88° |
| Longitude of the node (Ω) | 323.82+1.33 −0.66° |
| Periastron epoch (T) | 60,104.20±24 MJD |
| Argument of periastron (ω) (secondary) | 184.3+2.0 −2.3° |
| Semi-amplitude (K_{1}) (primary) | 17.1 km/s |

Details

KQ Pup A
| Mass | 9.67+1.39 −1.22 M_{☉} |
| Radius | 509+19 −17 R_{☉} |
| Luminosity | 41,700+8,400 −5,400 L_{☉} |
| Temperature | 3,660±170 K |
| Age | 18.1–38.0 Myr |

KQ Pup Ba
| Mass | 7.5–11.5 M_{☉} |
| Luminosity | 8,900 L_{☉} |
| Surface gravity (log g) | 3.61 cgs |
| Temperature | 19,900 K |
| Rotational velocity (v sin i) | 190±70 km/s |
| Age | 18.1–38.0 Myr |

KQ Pup Bb
| Mass | 1.2–8.1 M_{☉} |
| Age | 18.1–38.0 Myr |

Other designations
- KQ Pup, BD−14°1971, HIP 36773, HR 2902, NGC 2422 9, SAO 153072
- KQ Pup A: HD 60414
- KQ Pup B: HD 60415

Database references
| SIMBAD | data |

KQ Puppis is a triple star system in the constellation of Puppis. With an apparent magnitude varying between 4.82 and 5.17, it is faintly visible to the naked eye under skies with little to no luminous pollution. Based on dynamical parallax measurements, it is located at a distance of 2,630 light-years (805 parsecs).

== Characteristics ==
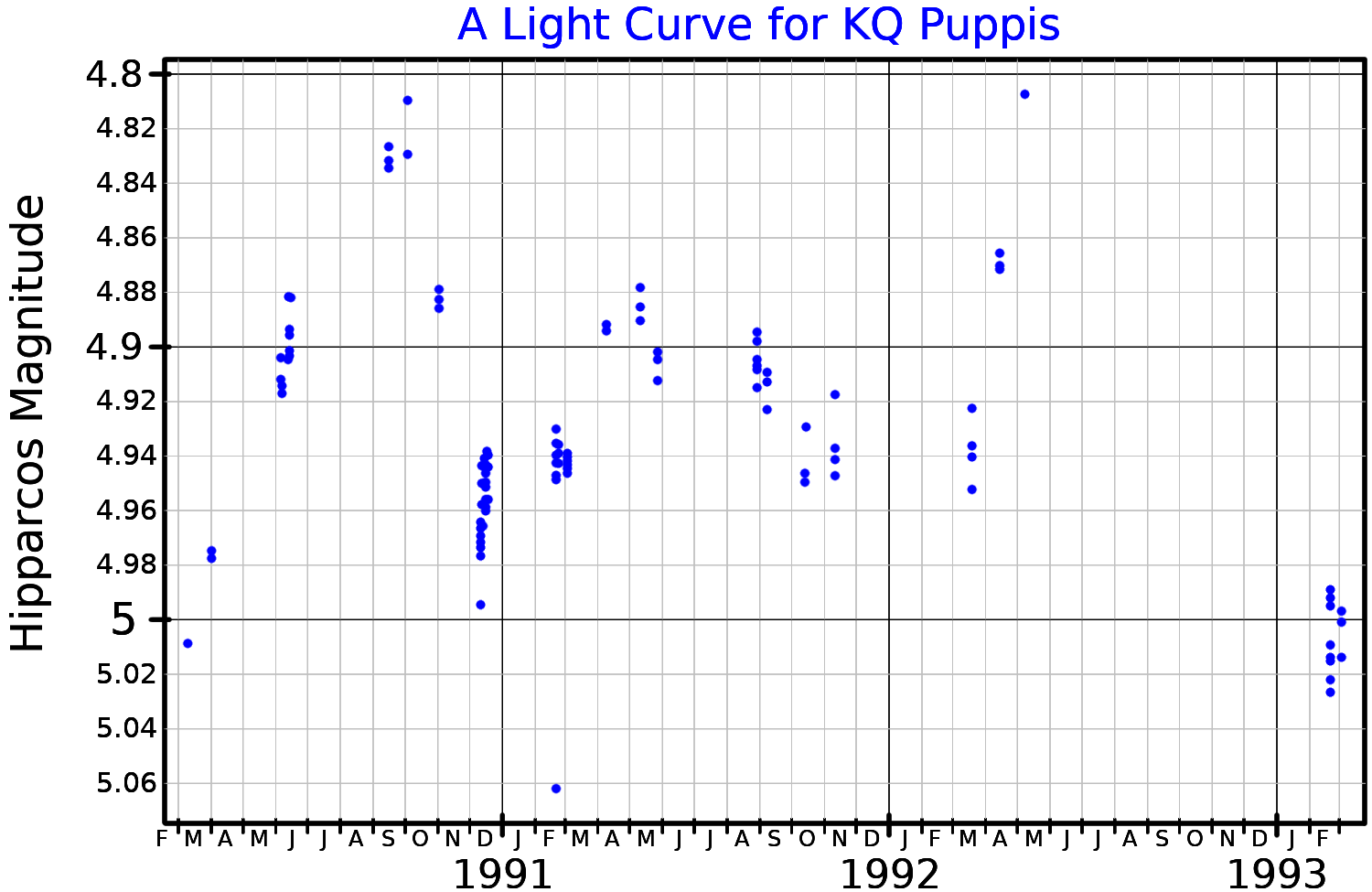
A light curve for KQ Puppis, plotted from Hipparcos data

The KQ Puppis system consists of three stars in a hierarchical configuration (i.e. a compact binary around a third component). The primary component, KQ Puppis A, is a red supergiant with around nine times the mass of the Sun, and 509 times the Sun's radius. It radiates 42,000 times the Sun's luminosity from its photosphere at an effective temperature of 3,660 K. It shows small amplitude irregular pulsations, and also some variation associated with the orbital motion.

KQ Puppis B is an eclipsing binary with an orbital period of 17.26 days and an estimated semi-major axis of 0.3 astronomical units. This inner pair orbits the red supergiant with an orbital period of 9,534 days and a semi-major axis of 25 au. KQ Puppis Ba is a rapidly-rotating B-type main-sequence star, with a mass between 7.5 and 11.5 times that of the Sun, a luminosity 8,900 times solar and a temperature around 19,900 K. KQ Puppis Bb has a mass in the range of 1.2–8.1 M_{☉}. The eccentricity of the inner orbit (≥0.236) is much higher than the expected for such a compact system, suggesting that the stellar wind of the supergiant is exciting the pair's eccentricity. No evidence of past mass transfer between the components has been found.

The red supergiant is losing mass from its strong stellar wind. Some of this mass is being transferred to the secondary (B), forming a disk of material around it. Binaries with such a characteristic are referred to as VV Cephei systems, although in this case the components do not eclipse each other. A portion of the disc does appear to be eclipsed and this is detected as a strong drop in far-ultraviolet radiation for about a third of the orbit.

KQ Puppis has been catalogued as an outlying member of the open cluster Messier 47 (NGC 2422) and would be the brightest member of that cluster. Membership is uncertain as it appears to be more distant than the other stars in the cluster.
