= F Puppis =

The Bayer designations F Puppis and f Puppis are distinct and refer to two different stars in the constellation Puppis:

- F Puppis (HD 57240)
- f Puppis (HD 61330)
