= 16 Puppis =

Star in the constellation Puppis

- Location of 16 Puppis (circled)

Observation data Epoch J2000 Equinox ICRS
- Constellation: Puppis
- Right ascension: 08^{h} 09^{m} 01.63741^{s}
- Declination: −19° 14′ 42.0521″
- Apparent magnitude (V): 4.40

Characteristics
- Spectral type: B5 V or B5 IV
- U−B color index: -0.60
- B−V color index: -0.15

Astrometry
Radial velocity (R_{v})	+19.90 km/s
Proper motion (μ)	RA: −9.87 mas/yr Dec.: −5.55 mas/yr
Parallax (π)	7.01±0.22 mas
Distance	470 ± 10 ly (143 ± 4 pc)
Absolute magnitude (M_{V})	-1.37

Details
Luminosity	836 L_{☉}
Surface gravity (log g)	3.701 cgs
Temperature	16,680 K
Rotational velocity (v sin i)	140 or 185 km/s

Other designations
- 16 Pup, BD−18°2190, FK5 2632, GC 11071, HD 67797, HIP 39906, HR 3192, SAO 153890, GSC 06004-03719

Database references
SIMBAD	data

16 Puppis is a suspected astrometric binary star system in the southern constellation of Puppis, and is located in the northernmost part of its constellation, almost due north of the bright star Rho Puppis, and east of Canis Major. It is visible to the naked eye as a faint, blue-white hued star with an apparent visual magnitude of 4.40. The star is located is approximately 465 light years away from the Sun based on parallax. It was the brightest star in Officina Typographica, an obsolete constellation.

The visible member is a B-type main-sequence star with a stellar classification of B5 V, according to N. Houk and M. Smith-Moore (1978). Earlier, Hoffleit et al. (1964) had listed a class of B5 IV, suggesting a more evolved subgiant star. It is spinning rapidly, which is creating an equatorial bulge that is 6% larger than the polar radius. The star is radiating 836 times the luminosity of the Sun from its photosphere at an effective temperature of 16,680 K.
