= HD 61772 =

Star in the constellation Puppis

- Location of HD 61772 (circled red)

Observation data Epoch J2000 Equinox ICRS
- Constellation: Puppis
- Right ascension: 07^{h} 40^{m} 23.21044^{s}
- Declination: −15° 15′ 50.1107″
- Apparent magnitude (V): 4.98

Characteristics
- Evolutionary stage: red giant branch
- Spectral type: K3II
- U−B color index: +1.79
- B−V color index: +1.56

Astrometry
Radial velocity (R_{v})	+0.10 km/s
Proper motion (μ)	RA: −2.171 mas/yr Dec.: −27.678 mas/yr
Parallax (π)	4.915±0.1044 mas
Distance	660 ± 10 ly (203 ± 4 pc)
Absolute magnitude (M_{V})	−1.65

Details
Mass	1.9 M_{☉}
Radius	61 R_{☉}
Luminosity	1,267 L_{☉}
Surface gravity (log g)	0.99 cgs
Temperature	4,018 K
Metallicity [Fe/H]	−0.13 dex
Rotational velocity (v sin i)	< 2.2 km/s
Age	1.32 Gyr

Other designations
- 140 Puppis, BD−14°2082, GC 10328, GSC 05980-01606, HIP 37379, HR 2959, HD 61772, SAO 153227

Database references
SIMBAD	data

HD 61772 is the bright red star towards lower left (south east), with Messier 46 to its northeast and Messier 47 to its northwest.

HD 61772 is a bright giant star in the constellation Puppis. Its apparent magnitude is 4.98 and it is approximately 660 light years away based on parallax.

The apparent Flamsteed designation 140 Puppis is actually a shorthand of the Gould designation 140 G. Puppis, unambiguous in this case.

The spectrum of HD 61772 match that of a K3II star, a cool bright giant. It has evolved away from the main sequence after about 1.3 billion years and is now 61 times the size of the Sun. Despite being cooler than the Sun at 4,018 K, it is over a thousand times more luminous. Evolutionary models place it near the tip of the red giant branch.
