= HD 41742 and HD 41700 =

Multiple star system in the constellation Puppis

- Location of HD 41742 (circled)

Observation data Epoch J2000.0 Equinox ICRS
- Constellation: Puppis
- HD 41742 A
- Right ascension: 06^{h} 04^{m} 40.101^{s}
- Declination: −45° 04′ 44.10″
- Apparent magnitude (V): 5.975±0.009
- HD 41742 B
- Right ascension: 06^{h} 04^{m} 39.782^{s}
- Declination: −45° 04′ 48.78″
- Apparent magnitude (V): 8.867±0.028
- HD 41700 (C)
- Right ascension: 06^{h} 04^{m} 28.439^{s}
- Declination: −45° 02′ 11.77″
- Apparent magnitude (V): 6.343±0.010

Characteristics

HD 41742 A
- Spectral type: F6V/K-MV(MS)
- B−V color index: 0.493±0.009

HD 41742 B
- Spectral type: K3V
- B−V color index: 1.014±0.076

HD 41700 (C)
- Spectral type: F7.5V
- B−V color index: 0.517±0.005

Astrometry

HD 41742 A
Radial velocity (R_{v})	27.0±2.5 (Note: Value not accounting for binary orbit) km/s
Proper motion (μ)	RA: −80.831 mas/yr Dec.: +251.617 mas/yr
Parallax (π)	35.779±0.2768 mas
Distance	91.2 ± 0.7 ly (27.9 ± 0.2 pc)
Absolute magnitude (M_{V})	3.853±0.024

HD 41742 B
Proper motion (μ)	RA: −84.025 mas/yr Dec.: 237.521 mas/yr
Parallax (π)	37.0030±0.0525 mas
Distance	88.1 ± 0.1 ly (27.02 ± 0.04 pc)
Absolute magnitude (M_{V})	6.745±0.043

HD 41700 (C)
Radial velocity (R_{v})	27.4±0.4 km/s
Proper motion (μ)	RA: −82.262 mas/yr Dec.: 246.246 mas/yr
Parallax (π)	36.8531±0.0162 mas
Distance	88.50 ± 0.04 ly (27.13 ± 0.01 pc)
Absolute magnitude (M_{V})	4.221±0.025

Details

HD 41742 A
Mass	1.20^{+0.07}_{−0.06} M_{☉} / ~≥0.21 ± 0.06 M_{☉}
Radius	1.38 R_{☉}
Luminosity	2.667 L_{☉}
Surface gravity (log g)	4.30 ± ~0.10 cgs
Temperature	6,363±85 K
Metallicity [Fe/H]	−0.17±0.10 dex
Rotation	≤2.0 days (maximum rotational period, derived from v sin i if i = 90°)
Rotational velocity (v sin i)	26.7±1.3 km/s
Age	3.3 Gyr

HD 41742 B
Mass	0.80 M_{☉}
Radius	0.900 R_{☉}
Luminosity	0.248 L_{☉}
Surface gravity (log g)	4.38 cgs
Temperature	4,294 K
Metallicity [Fe/H]	−0.22 dex

HD 41700 (C)
Mass	1.13^{+0.04}_{−0.07} M_{☉}
Radius	1.197 R_{☉}
Luminosity	1.789 L_{☉}
Surface gravity (log g)	4.36 cgs
Temperature	6,165±80 K
Metallicity [Fe/H]	−0.19±0.10 dex
Rotational velocity (v sin i)	16.6±1.0 km/s
Age	3.7 Gyr

Other designations
- HD 41742 A: HIP 28790, TYC 8101-1755-1, HR 2158
- HD 41742 B: TYC 8101-1757-1
- HD 41700 (C): HIP 28764, GJ 9200, TYC 8101-309-1, HR 2157

Database references

HD 41742 A
SIMBAD	data

HD 41742 B
SIMBAD	data

HD 41700 (C)
SIMBAD	data

HD 41742 and HD 41700 is a star system that lies approximately 88 light-years away in the constellation of Puppis. The system consists of two bright stars where the primary is orbited by two fainter stars, making it a quadruple with an unequal hierarchy.

The fainter star HD 41700 was designated Rho Columbae (ρ Col) by Nicolas Louis de Lacaille before Francis Baily included it in Puppis and leaving it undesignated.

== Component discovery ==
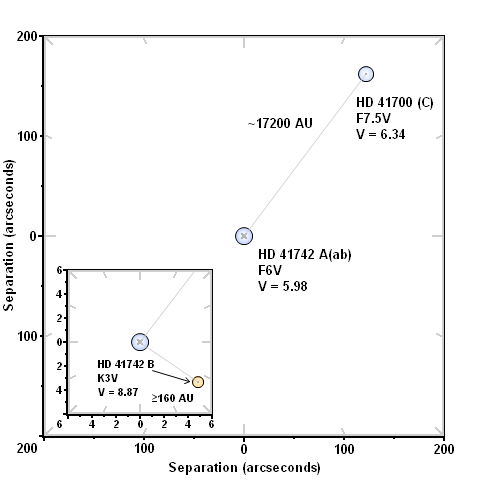
A diagram of the visual components of the HD 41742/41700 system

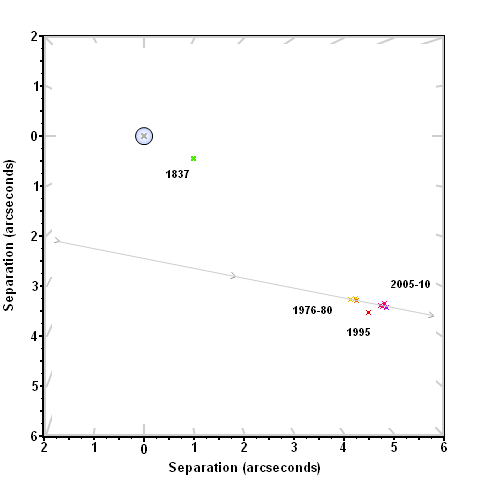
HD 41742 B's motion relative to HD 41742 Aab

HD 41742 B was discovered early on in the history of visual binaries, due to the brightness of the primary. The earliest measurement in the Washington Double Star Catalog (WDS) dates to 1837 and was made by William Herschel, stating a position angle of 246° and a separation of 1.1" for the companion. Surprisingly, recent measures suggest that the secondary has moved significantly over the two centuries since, with it lying at a position angle of around 215° and a separation increasing between 5.30" in the late 1970s to 5.95" in 2010. This translates to a minimum change in physical separation between 142 and 159 AU over 35 years, which suggests that HD 41742 B is moving quickly away from the primary.

Lying at a considerably wider separation, HD 41700 was first observed relative to HD 41742 later than the tighter binary, despite being much brighter. The first measurement in the WDS dates to 1854 and was again made by Herschel, giving a position angle of 320° and a separation of 174". More recent values agree on the position angle, but suggest a separation closer to 200". The wide separation of this tertiary component means that it has a separate Hipparcos entry to the primary, which confirms that the two stars lie at the same distance and are co-moving. The physical separation between the two is about 0.026 parsecs (0.084 light-years), or approximately 17200 AU. This is comparable to the ~15000 AU separation between Alpha Centauri AB and Proxima Centauri; such wide separations between components are relatively rare, at least for solar-type stars.

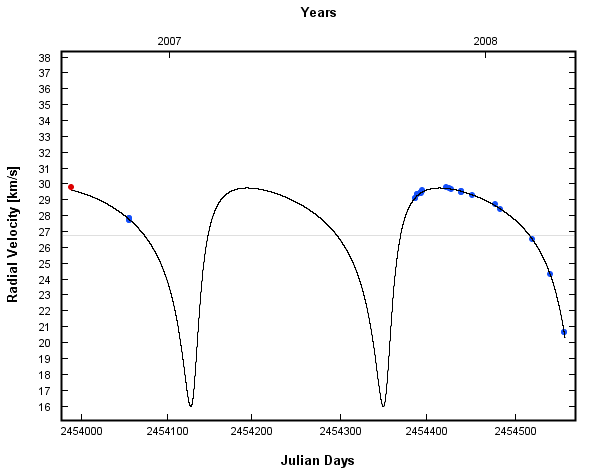
An orbital fit to HD 41742 A's radial velocity

Radial velocity observations of HD 41742 A with the HARPS spectrograph detected variations on a level of several km/s over a period of months, indicating that the star is a single-lined spectroscopic binary (SB1). Though an orbital fit was not attempted, A good orbital fit is possible (left), which implies that HD 41742 Ab has a minimum mass of ~0.2 M_{☉}, and is on a high eccentricity ~222-day orbit around the 1.2 M_{☉} primary. Given that the lines of the secondary are not detected, it must have a significantly lower luminosity than the primary, indicating that it is of late spectral type.

== Properties ==
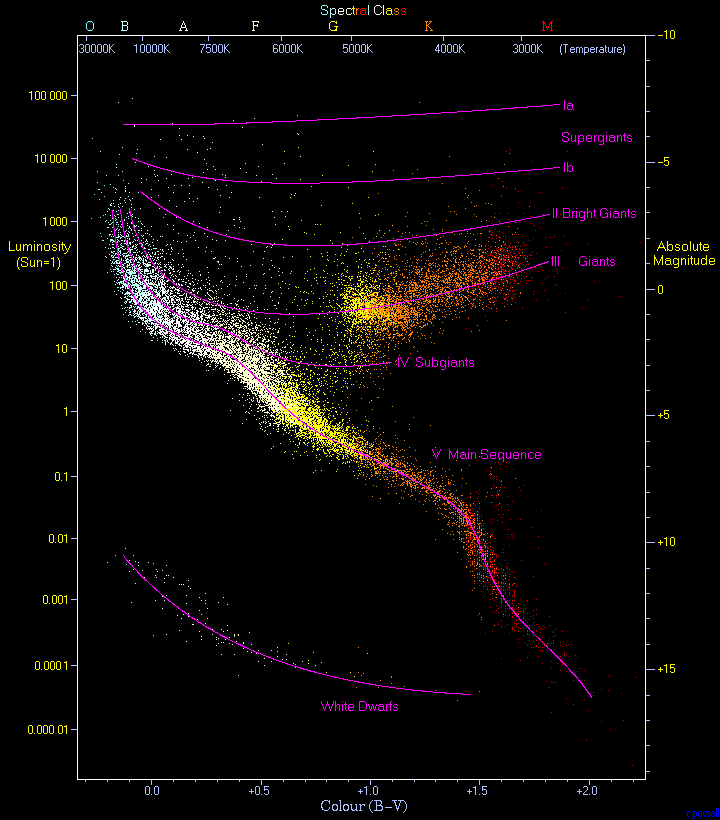
The position of HD 41742 (A/B) and HD 41700 (C) on the Hertzsprung-Russell diagram

On the celestial sphere, HD 41742/41700 can be seen as a 6th magnitude star (a magnitude barely observable by the naked eye under good conditions) lying close to the border between Puppis and Pictor. The nearest bright star to its location is the 4th magnitude Eta Columbae approximately two arcminutes to the north; The system lies about a quarter of the distance between Eta Columbae and Canopus (Alpha Carinae) on the sky.

HD 41742 A and HD 41700 (C) are similar stars, with their colours indicating spectral types of F6 and F7.5; this means that the two stars are about 500 K hotter than the Sun, and in turn the difference in temperature between the stars is about 150 kelvins. The stars lie slightly below the main sequence on the Hertzsprung–Russell diagram (left image), which is probably due to their sub-solar metallicity (Fe/H ≈ −0.2).

HD 41742 B is a much cooler star than the brighter components; its B-V indicates a spectral type of K3, making it approximately 1000 K cooler than the Sun. It lies on the main sequence on the HRD (left image), and its photometry is fully consistent with an 0.8 M_{☉} dwarf.

Indication of a young age for the HD 41742/41700 system was first found Henry et al. (1996), detecting large chromospheric activity in HD 41700; they measured a log R'_{HK} of −4.35 for the star, significantly higher than a "quiet" value of < −4.70, indicating that the system is considerably younger than 1 Gyr. The brightest stars in the system are both moderately fast rotators for late-F dwarfs, again indicating that they are young. Finally, HD 41700 has a somewhat large lithium content; because lithium is used up by a star at an approximately constant rate over its lifetime, this can be used to estimate a star's age. For HD 41700, its lithium abundance indicates an age of 200 ± 50 million years.

Some young star systems remain loosely associated with other stars that formed in the same molecular cloud as they move through space, known as a moving group. The HD 41742/41700 system has space velocities of (UVW) = −37.8, −10.4, −14.6 km/s, which is similar to those of the Hyades (UVW = −39.7, −17.7, −2.4 km/s); however, the system is probably not a Hyad because it has a lower peculiar velocity than expected, as well as a lower metallicity and lithium age than the Hyades.

Another feature prevalent around young stars are debris disks. For HD 41742 A and HD 41700 (C), IRAS and ISO detected infra-red excesses, which are typically indicative of disks of material re-radiating absorbed light at redder wavelengths; however, in both cases evidence against the excesses have been found. For HD 41742 A, the excess is offset by 26", which is large enough so that contamination from another object is likely responsible for the excess, while for HD 41700 (C) the excess has not been confirmed by Spitzer observations.

== Planet searches ==
HD 41700 (C) is included on the CORALIE and Keck-HIRES planet search samples. No variability has been announced so far, so the star likely does not host a close-in, easily detectable giant planet.

HD 41742 A was included on a planet search around early-type (<~F7) stars with HARPS that detected its spectroscopic binarity, as discussed above.
