= QY Puppis =

Red supergiant star in the constellation of Puppis

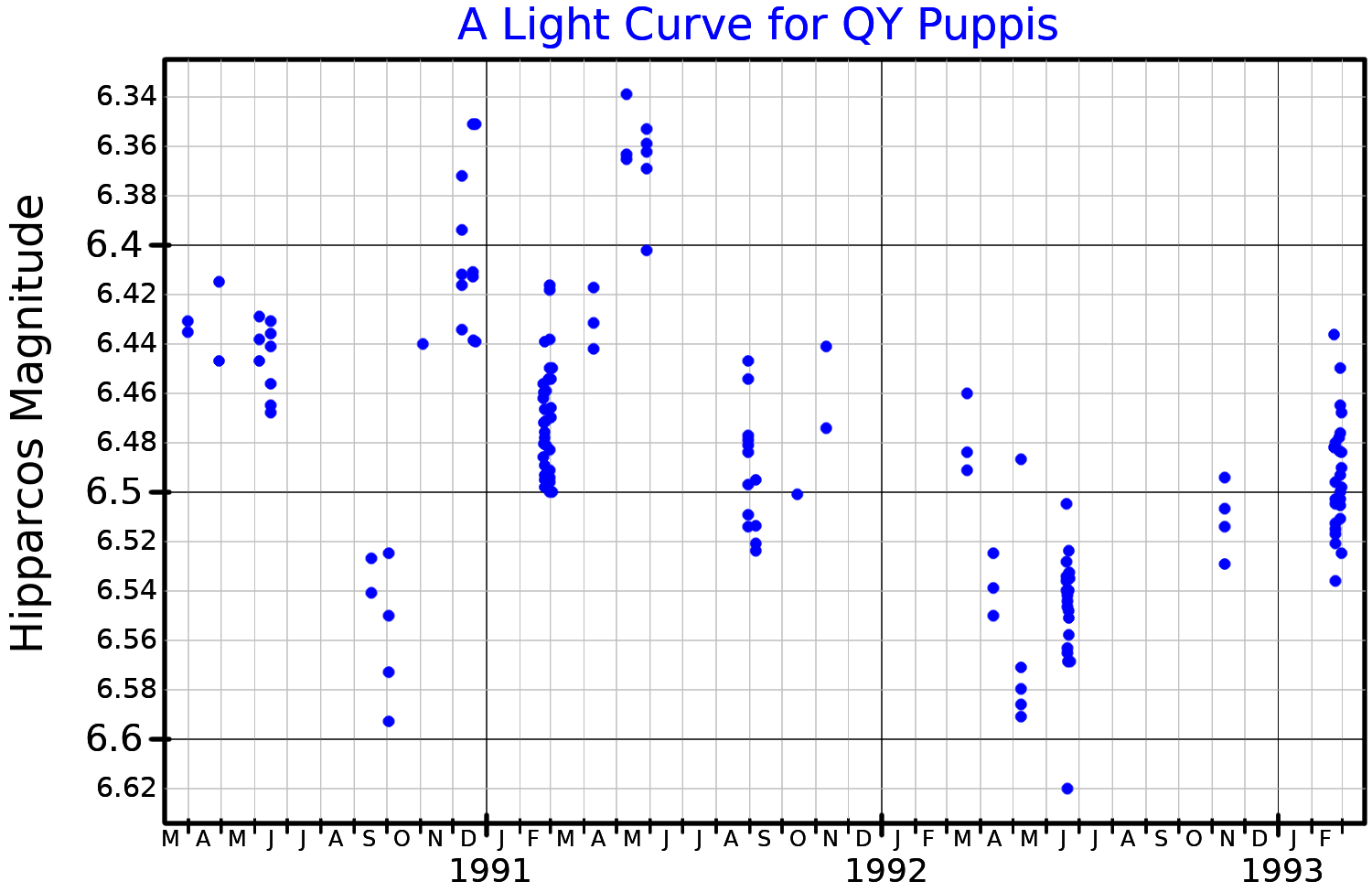
- A light curve for QY Puppis, plotted from Hipparcos data

Observation data Epoch J2000 Equinox J2000
- Constellation: Puppis
- Right ascension: 07^{h} 47^{m} 38.5262^{s}
- Declination: −15° 59′ 26.480″
- Apparent magnitude (V): 6.24 - 6.71

Characteristics
- Spectral type: K1Ia-Iab
- Apparent magnitude (J): 3.746
- Apparent magnitude (H): 2.958
- Apparent magnitude (K): 2.702
- Variable type: SRd

Astrometry
Proper motion (μ)	RA: −2.017 mas/yr Dec.: −3.596 mas/yr
Parallax (π)	0.3197±0.0330 mas
Distance	10,200 ly (3,100 pc)

Details
Mass	6.2±0.4 M_{☉}
Radius	515 R_{☉}
Luminosity	62,500–63,700 L_{☉}
Surface gravity (log g)	0.16 cgs
Temperature	4,251±46 K
Metallicity [Fe/H]	0.05 dex
Age	63.6±21.7 Myr

Other designations
- BD−15°2049, HD 63302, HIP 38031, HR 3026, WDS J07478-1601

Database references
SIMBAD	data

QY Puppis is a K-type supergiant star in the constellation of Puppis. With a radius of 515 R_{☉}, it is on the smaller end of the largest known stars. A variable star, its apparent magnitude varies from 6.24 to 6.71, making it very faintly visible to the naked eye under ideal observing conditions, when it is at its brightest.

== Properties ==
In 1981, Armando Arellano Ferro published an article stating that the star, then called HD 63302, might be a variable star. It was given its variable star designation, QY Puppis, in 1985. QY Puppis has been classified in the General Catalogue of Variable Stars as a semiregular variable star of type SRD. QY Puppis has a temperature of 4,251 K, and has expanded to a radius of 515 R_{☉}. It is approximately 60 million years old, with a mass of 6.2 M_{☉}.
