= HJ 4093 =

Quadruple star system in the constellation Puppis

- Location of HJ 4093 (circled)

Observation data Epoch J2000 Equinox ICRS
- Constellation: Puppis
- HD 71487
- Right ascension: 08^{h} 26^{m} 17.7301^{s}
- Declination: −39° 03′ 32.258″
- Apparent magnitude (V): 6.49±0.01 (6.588 + 8.96) primary eclipse: 6.98 secondary ecl.: 6.66
- HD 71488
- Right ascension: 08^{h} 26^{m} 18.3057^{s}
- Declination: −39° 03′ 36.747″
- Apparent magnitude (V): 7.40 (7.900 + 8.10)

Characteristics

HD 71487
- Evolutionary stage: Main sequence
- Spectral type: B9V + A7V
- B−V color index: −0.11
- Variable type: Eclipsing binary

HD 71488
- Evolutionary stage: Main sequence
- Spectral type: A5V + A6V
- B−V color index: +0.30

Astrometry

HD 71487
Radial velocity (R_{v})	+25.4±0.6 km/s
Proper motion (μ)	RA: −7.896 mas/yr Dec.: +5.975 mas/yr
Parallax (π)	5.7991±0.0304 mas
Distance	562 ± 3 ly (172.4 ± 0.9 pc)
Absolute magnitude (M_{V})	+0.258±0.409

HD 71488
Proper motion (μ)	RA: −6.1±2.0 mas/yr Dec.: +10.4±2.9 mas/yr

Position (relative to HD 71487)
Component	HD 71488
Epoch of observation	2015
Angular distance	8.1″
Position angle	124°

Orbit
Primary	HD 71487 A
Name	HD 71487 B
Period (P)	1.2569956(9) days
Semi-major axis (a)	0.03956±0.00023 au (8.51±0.05 R_{☉})
Eccentricity (e)	0.127±0.027
Inclination (i)	81.33±0.20°
Semi-amplitude (K_{1}) (primary)	109.9±0.9 km/s
Semi-amplitude (K_{2}) (secondary)	232.1±1.5 km/s

Orbit
Primary	HD 71488 A
Name	HD 71488 B
Period (P)	101.3±3.8 years
Semi-major axis (a)	0.179±0.012" (34.4 au)
Eccentricity (e)	0.054±0.041
Inclination (i)	155±13°
Longitude of the node (Ω)	47±71°
Periastron epoch (T)	1976.23±13.06
Argument of periastron (ω) (secondary)	318±74°

Details

HD 71487 A
Mass	3.58±0.11 M_{☉}
Radius	2.17±0.03 R_{☉}
Luminosity	133±24 L_{☉}
Surface gravity (log g)	4.3±0.1 cgs
Temperature	13,300±500 K
Metallicity [Fe/H]	−0.02±0.01 dex
Rotation	1.32 days
Rotational velocity (v sin i)	65±5 km/s
Age	20 Myr

HD 71487 B
Mass	1.68±0.09 M_{☉}
Radius	1.51±0.06 R_{☉}
Luminosity	6.2±2.2 L_{☉}
Surface gravity (log g)	4.2±0.1 cgs
Temperature	7,400±500 K
Metallicity [Fe/H]	−0.08±0.03 dex
Rotational velocity (v sin i)	64±2 km/s
Age	20 Myr

HD 71488 A
Mass	2.0 M_{☉}
Age	20 Myr

HD 71488 B
Mass	1.8 M_{☉}
Age	20 Myr

Other designations
- HJ 4093, B 1605, CD−38°4462, HIP 41361, CCDM J08263-3904, WDS J08263-3904
- HD 71487: NO Puppis, HR 3327, SAO 199222, TYC 7661-4332-1
- HD 71488: HR 3328, SAO 199224, TYC 7661-4332-2

Database references
SIMBAD	HD 71487
- HD 71488

HJ 4093 (WDS J08263-3904) is a star system in the constellation Puppis. It comprises HD 71487 and HD 71488, which together form a visual binary and are themselves close binary systems, making HJ 4093 a four-star system. They are separated by about 1,400 astronomical units, having an estimated orbital period in the order of 10,000 years. The combined apparent magnitude is 6.07, making the system (faintly) visible to the naked eye only in ideal conditions, within places far from light pollution.

Parallax measurements by the Gaia spacecraft place HJ 4093 at a distance of 172±1 parsecs (562±3 light-years). (Note: The distance of 173.7173 parsecs published in Gaia DR3 is based on spectra rather than parallax.) The system is very young, at 20 million years old, and is part of an unnamed stellar association.

== HD 71487 ==
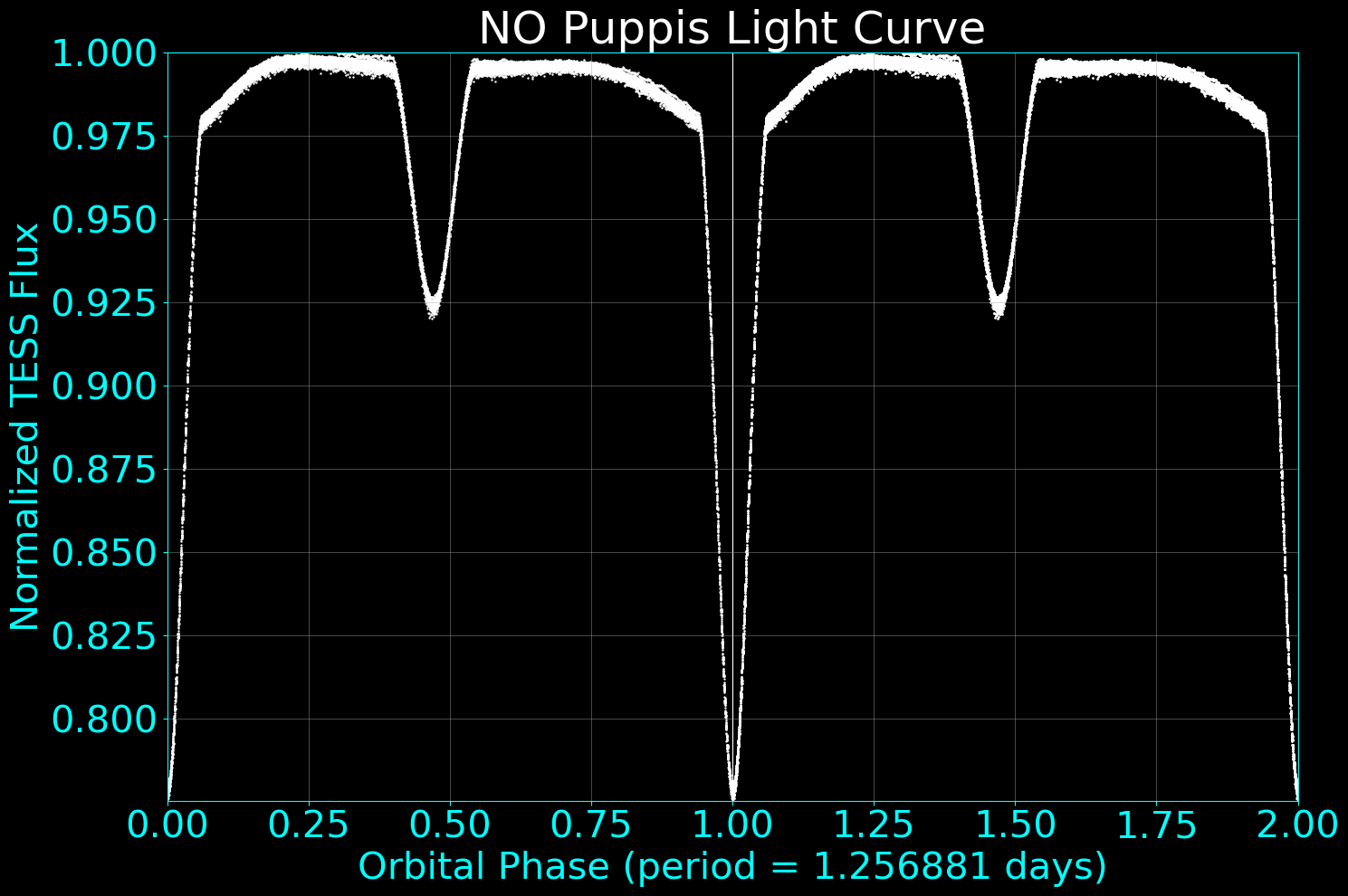
A light curve for NO Puppis, plotted from TESS data

HD 71487, also called HJ 4093 A and more frequently NO Puppis, is an eclipsing binary with an orbital period of 1.256 days. The overall apparent magnitude is 6.49, and during the primary (deeper) and secondary eclipse it drops to 6.98 and 6.66, respectively. The variability of this system was announced in 1972 by B. G. Jorgensen. When using a designation about the entire system (e.g. HJ 4093), the primary and secondary are referred to as Aa and Ab, respectively, but when using a specific designation (e.g. HD 71487) they may simply be called "A" and "B". (Note: NO Puppis, while originally used only for HD 71487, is sometimes applied to the entire system, as in Erdem et al. (2025). In this situation, the components are named NO Puppis Aa and NO Puppis Ab.)

The components have stellar classifications of B8V and A7V, suggesting they are hot main sequence stars. NO Puppis A has 3.58 times the mass (M_{☉}) and 2.17 times the radius (R_{☉}), while NO Puppis B has 1.68 times the mass and 1.51 times the radius of the Sun. The effective temperature of A is 13,300 K, giving it the blue-white hue typical of a late B-type star, while that of component B is 7,400 K, giving it the whitish hue typical of a late A-type star. NO Puppis A lies in the instability strip of slowly pulsating B-type stars and is likely of this variable star class, while NO Puppis B lies in the instability strip of Delta Scuti variables and appears to exhibit δ Scuti-like pulsations.

The stars are separated by 8.5 R_{☉} and have an orbital eccentricity of 0.13, which is unusually high for such a close binary system, given that an orbit with such a separation would be expected to be nearly circular. At some point the system may have had several more components that were ejected due to gravitational perturbations, inducing a high eccentricity for this system.

== HD 71488 ==
HD 71488, also called HJ 4093 B, is an astrometric binary system with an apparent magnitude is 7.27. The components have an orbital period of 100 years. When using a designation about the entire system (e.g. HJ 4093), the primary and secondary are referred to as Ba and Bb, respectively, or sometimes as B and C, as in CCDM J08263-3904BC. When using a specific designation (e.g. HD 71488) they can be called simply "A" and "B". Based on its estimated absolute magnitude and mass–luminosity relations, HD 71488 A is expected to have a spectral type of A5V and an estimated mass of 2.0 M_{☉}, while HD 71488 B would have a spectral type of A6V and an estimated 1.8 times the mass of the Sun, although direct observations give a combined spectral class of A2Va.
