= MX Puppis =

Star in the constellation Puppis

- Location of MX Puppis (circled)

Observation data Epoch J2000 Equinox ICRS
- Constellation: Puppis
- Right ascension: 08^{h} 13^{m} 29.51720^{s}
- Declination: −35° 53′ 58.2662″
- Apparent magnitude (V): 4.60 - 4.92

Characteristics
- Spectral type: B1.5 IVe
- U−B color index: −0.98
- B−V color index: −0.11
- Variable type: γ Cas

Astrometry
Radial velocity (R_{v})	+35.00 km/s
Proper motion (μ)	RA: −7.30 mas/yr Dec.: +9.75 mas/yr
Parallax (π)	3.51±0.16 mas
Distance	930 ± 40 ly (280 ± 10 pc)
Absolute magnitude (M_{V})	−2.97

Details
Mass	10.1 M_{☉}
Radius	6.5 R_{☉}
Luminosity	28,840 L_{☉}
Surface gravity (log g)	4.41 cgs
Temperature	32,870 K
Rotational velocity (v sin i)	145 km/s
Age	22.5 Myr

Other designations
- r Puppis, CD−35°4349, GC 11197, GSC 07133-04588, HIP 40274, HR 3237, HD 68980, SAO 198957

Database references
SIMBAD	data

MX Puppis (MX Pup) is a class B1.5IV (blue subgiant) star in the constellation Puppis. Its apparent magnitude varies irregularly between magnitude 4.6 and 4.9 and it is classified as a Gamma Cassiopeiae variable. It is approximately 930 light years away based on parallax.

MX Puppis was first found to be a variable star by Alan William James Cousins in 1959. It was given its variable star designation in 1972.

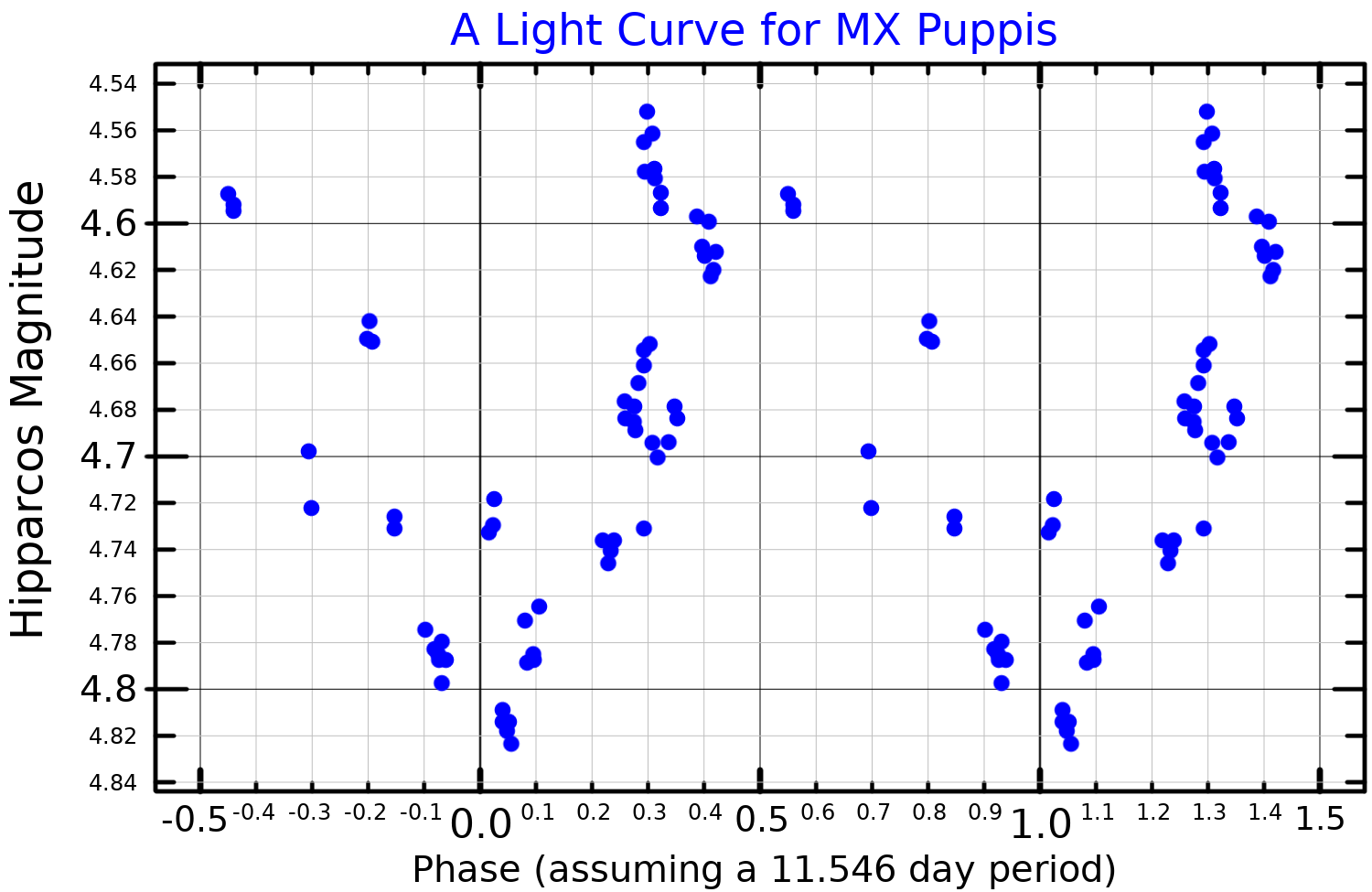
A light curve for MX Puppis, adapted from Hubert and Floquet (1998)
