= HD 59612 =

Star in the constellation Puppis

- Location of HD 59612 (circled)

Observation data Epoch J2000 Equinox J2000
- Constellation: Puppis
- Right ascension: 07^{h} 29^{m} 51.41230^{s}
- Declination: −23° 01′ 27.4447″
- Apparent magnitude (V): 4.86

Characteristics
- Spectral type: A5 Ib
- U−B color index: +0.17
- B−V color index: +0.24

Astrometry
Radial velocity (R_{v})	35.00 km/s
Proper motion (μ)	RA: −2.831 mas/yr Dec.: +4.172 mas/yr
Parallax (π)	0.7535±0.0738 mas
Distance	4,300 ± 400 ly (1,300 ± 100 pc)
Absolute magnitude (M_{V})	−5.10

Details
Mass	12.9 M_{☉}
Radius	44 R_{☉}
Luminosity	10,864 L_{☉}
Surface gravity (log g)	1.78 cgs
Temperature	8,620 K
Metallicity [Fe/H]	+0.02 dex
Rotational velocity (v sin i)	27 km/s
Age	15 Myr

Other designations
- BD−22°1897, CD−22°4587, CCDM J07299-2301AB, GC 10043, HD 59612, HIP 36431, HR 2874, SAO 173864, WDS J07299-2301AB

Database references
SIMBAD	data

HD 59612 is a class A5Ib supergiant star in the constellation Puppis. Its apparent magnitude is 4.86 and it is approximately 4,300 light years away based on parallax.

It has one companion, B, at magnitude 10.7 and separation 3.0". It shares a common proper motion with HD 59612 and is at a similar distance.
