= HD 65810 =

Star in the constellation Puppis

- Location of HD 65810 (circled)

Observation data Epoch J2000 Equinox ICRS
- Constellation: Puppis
- Right ascension: 07^{h} 59^{m} 52.05117^{s}
- Declination: −18° 23′ 57.2292″
- Apparent magnitude (V): 4.61

Characteristics
- Evolutionary stage: main sequence
- Spectral type: A2Vn
- U−B color index: +0.08
- B−V color index: +0.08

Astrometry
Radial velocity (R_{v})	-13.30 km/s
Proper motion (μ)	RA: -6.38 mas/yr Dec.: -36.05 mas/yr
Parallax (π)	13.52±0.64 mas
Distance	240 ± 10 ly (74 ± 4 pc)
Absolute magnitude (M_{V})	0.27

Details
Mass	2.69 M_{☉}
Radius	3.6 R_{☉}
Luminosity	87 L_{☉}
Surface gravity (log g)	3.38 cgs
Temperature	8,892 K
Rotational velocity (v sin i)	218 km/s

Other designations
- BD−18°2118, FK5 1212, GC 10825, HD 65810, HIP 39095, HR 3131, SAO 153687, GSC 05986-03435

Database references
SIMBAD	data

HD 65810 is a class A2V (white main-sequence) star in the constellation Puppis. Its apparent magnitude is 4.61 and it is approximately 241 light years away based on parallax.
