= HD 59890 =

Star in the constellation Puppis

- Location of HD 59890 (circled)

Observation data Epoch J2000 Equinox ICRS
- Constellation: Puppis
- Right ascension: 07^{h} 30^{m} 42.60231^{s}
- Declination: −30° 57′ 44.2137″
- Apparent magnitude (V): 4.65

Characteristics
- Spectral type: G3Ib
- U−B color index: +0.63
- B−V color index: +0.93

Astrometry
Radial velocity (R_{v})	+14.80 km/s
Proper motion (μ)	RA: −11.969 mas/yr Dec.: +1.055 mas/yr
Parallax (π)	2.3999±0.0898 mas
Distance	1,360 ± 50 ly (420 ± 20 pc)
Absolute magnitude (M_{V})	−3.64

Details
Mass	10.9 M_{☉}
Radius	65 R_{☉}
Luminosity	3165 L_{☉}
Surface gravity (log g)	1.37 cgs
Temperature	5,437 K
Metallicity [Fe/H]	+0.08 dex
Rotational velocity (v sin i)	9.4 km/s

Other designations
- CD−30°4620, GC 10071, HIP 36514, HR 2881, HD 59890, SAO 198064

Database references
SIMBAD	data

HD 59890 is a class G3Ib yellow supergiant star in the constellation Puppis. Its apparent magnitude is 4.65 and it is approximately 1,360 light years away based on parallax.
