= HD 51799 =

Star in the constellation Puppis

- Location of HD 51799 (circled)

Observation data Epoch J2000 Equinox ICRS
- Constellation: Puppis
- Right ascension: 06^{h} 56^{m} 15.98999^{s}
- Declination: −48° 43′ 16.1257″
- Apparent magnitude (V): 4.95 (4.99 - 5.05)

Characteristics
- Spectral type: M1III
- U−B color index: +1.92
- B−V color index: +1.69
- Variable type: SRb?

Astrometry
Radial velocity (R_{v})	+22.10 km/s
Proper motion (μ)	RA: +1.01 mas/yr Dec.: +7.57 mas/yr
Parallax (π)	3.79±0.15 mas
Distance	860 ± 30 ly (260 ± 10 pc)
Absolute magnitude (M_{V})	-2.16

Details
Luminosity	2,532 L_{☉}
Temperature	3,780 K

Other designations
- CD-48°2601, GC 9137, GSC 08122-01697, HIP 33357, HR 2608, HD 51799, NSV 17249, SAO 218324

Database references
SIMBAD	data

HD 51799 is a class M1III (red giant) star in the constellation Puppis. Its apparent magnitude is 4.95 and it is approximately 860 light years away based on parallax.
