= HD 68601 =

Star in the constellation Puppis

- Location of HD 68601 (circled)

Observation data Epoch J2000 Equinox ICRS
- Constellation: Puppis
- Right ascension: 08^{h} 11^{m} 25.89174^{s}
- Declination: −42° 59′ 14.1988″
- Apparent magnitude (V): 4.75

Characteristics
- Spectral type: A7 Ib
- U−B color index: +0.07
- B−V color index: +0.18

Astrometry
Radial velocity (R_{v})	+19.20 km/s
Proper motion (μ)	RA: -6.37 mas/yr Dec.: +4.64 mas/yr
Parallax (π)	0.78±0.14 mas
Distance	approx. 4,200 ly (approx. 1,300 pc)
Absolute magnitude (M_{V})	-5.73

Details
Mass	1.6 M_{☉}
Luminosity	16,310 L_{☉}
Temperature	7,220 K
Rotational velocity (v sin i)	0 km/s

Other designations
- CD-42°3979, CCDM J08114-4259A, GC 11155, GSC 07668-03980, HIP 40096, HR 3226, HD 68601, SAO 219569, WDS J08114-4259A

Database references
SIMBAD	data

HD 68601 is a class A7Ib (white supergiant) star in the constellation Puppis. Its apparent magnitude is 4.75 and it is approximately 4,200 light years away based on parallax.

It has one companion, B, with magnitude 9.81 and separation 26.4".
