= HD 50235 =

Star in the constellation Puppis

- Location of HD 50235 (circled)

Observation data Epoch J2000 Equinox ICRS
- Constellation: Puppis
- Right ascension: 06^{h} 50^{m} 52.35242^{s}
- Declination: −34° 22′ 02.3427″
- Apparent magnitude (V): 4.99

Characteristics
- Spectral type: K5III
- U−B color index: +1.56
- B−V color index: +1.38

Astrometry
Radial velocity (R_{v})	+30.30 km/s
Proper motion (μ)	RA: +4.26 mas/yr Dec.: +1.26 mas/yr
Parallax (π)	4.00±0.25 mas
Distance	820 ± 50 ly (250 ± 20 pc)
Absolute magnitude (M_{V})	-1.99

Details
Radius	64 R_{☉}
Luminosity	1,185 L_{☉}
Temperature	4,420 K
Rotational velocity (v sin i)	2.8 km/s

Other designations
- CD-34°3140, GC 8979, GSC 07096-02300, HIP 32855, HR 2549, HD 50235, SAO 197277

Database references
SIMBAD	data

HD 50235 is a class K5III (orange giant) star located approximately 811 light years away, in the constellation Puppis. Its apparent magnitude is 4.99.
