= HD 56456 =

Star in the constellation Puppis

- Location of HD 56456 (circled)

Observation data Epoch J2000 Equinox ICRS
- Constellation: Puppis
- Right ascension: 07^{h} 14^{m} 38.14062^{s}
- Declination: −48° 16′ 18.9420″
- Apparent magnitude (V): 4.76

Characteristics
- Evolutionary stage: main sequence
- Spectral type: B8.5Vn
- U−B color index: -0.29
- B−V color index: -0.10

Astrometry
Radial velocity (R_{v})	+39.00 km/s
Proper motion (μ)	RA: -4.40 mas/yr Dec.: +0.01 mas/yr
Parallax (π)	8.66±0.17 mas
Distance	377 ± 7 ly (115 ± 2 pc)
Absolute magnitude (M_{V})	-0.56

Details
Mass	3.39 M_{☉}
Luminosity	220 L_{☉}
Temperature	10,860 K
Rotational velocity (v sin i)	240 km/s

Other designations
- CD−48°2807, GC 9635, HD 56456, HIP 35020, HR 2762, SAO 218567, CCDM J07146-4816A, WDS J07146-4816A, GSC 08123-02767

Database references
SIMBAD	data

HD 56456 is a class B8.5V (blue main-sequence) star in the constellation Puppis. Its apparent magnitude is 4.76 and it is approximately 377 light years away based on parallax.

It has one companion, B, at magnitude 13.5 and separation 18".
