= HD 64740 =

Star in the constellation Puppis

- Location of HD 64740 (circled)

Observation data Epoch J2000 Equinox ICRS
- Constellation: Puppis
- Right ascension: 07^{h} 53^{m} 03.63538^{s}
- Declination: −49° 36′ 46.9530″
- Apparent magnitude (V): 4.63

Characteristics
- Spectral type: B2V
- U−B color index: −0.92
- B−V color index: −0.23
- Variable type: Constant

Astrometry
Radial velocity (R_{v})	+8.00±4.2 km/s
Proper motion (μ)	RA: −7.77 mas/yr Dec.: +15.16 mas/yr
Parallax (π)	4.30±0.15 mas
Distance	760 ± 30 ly (233 ± 8 pc)
Absolute magnitude (M_{V})	−2.2±0.1

Details
Mass	9.6 M_{☉} 10.1±0.5 M_{☉}
Radius	4.5±0.7 R_{☉}
Luminosity	5,908 L_{☉}
Surface gravity (log g)	4.01±0.09 cgs
Temperature	23,700 K
Metallicity [Fe/H]	+0.01 dex
Rotation	1.33026 d
Rotational velocity (v sin i)	160 km/s
Age	12.6+7.4 −2.7 Myr

Other designations
- CD−49°3137, CPD−49°1398, GC 10686, HD 64740, HIP 38500, HR 3089, SAO 219106, GSC 08143-03240

Database references
SIMBAD	data

HD 64740 is a single star in the southern constellation Puppis, positioned near the line of sight to the Gum Nebula. It has a blue-white hue and is faintly visible to the naked eye with an apparent visual magnitude of 4.63. Parallax measurements give a distance estimate of approximately 760 light-years from the Sun, and it is drifting further away with a radial velocity of +8 km/s.

This is a massive B-type main-sequence star with a stellar classification of B2V. It is a magnetic chemically peculiar star of the helium strong variety with weak hydrogen alpha emission. The polar magnetic field strength is 3,700 G. The star is about halfway through its main sequence lifetime with an estimated age of ~13 million years. It is spinning rapidly with an equatorial velocity of about 140±10 km/s, based on a polar inclination angle of 36°±15°, giving it a rotation period of ~1.33 days. The star is radiating over 5,900 times the luminosity of the Sun from its photosphere at an effective temperature of 23,700 K.

Significant X-ray emission has been detected originating from this star, which may be connected to the magnetically confined stellar wind. The star does not display pulsation behavior, but it does show a magnetically modulated variation from the wind. Variation of ultraviolet lines of silicon has been detected, which may be due to surface abundance variations. Two patches of helium overabundance are observed near the magnetic poles, which are inclined by about 20° to the star's pole of rotation.
