= 3 Puppis =

Binary star system in the constellation Puppis

- Location of 3 Puppis (circled)

Observation data Epoch J2000 Equinox ICRS
- Constellation: Puppis
- Right ascension: 07^{h} 43^{m} 48.46872^{s}
- Declination: −28° 57′ 17.3720″
- Apparent magnitude (V): 3.93

Characteristics
- Spectral type: A2.7Ib (A2Ia - A3IIpe)
- Apparent magnitude (K): 2.340
- U−B color index: −0.09
- B−V color index: +0.18

Astrometry
Radial velocity (R_{v})	4.95±0.10 km/s
Proper motion (μ)	RA: −5.09 mas/yr Dec.: +3.90 mas/yr
Parallax (π)	0.59±0.17 mas
Distance	2,100±280 ly (630±85 pc)
Absolute magnitude (M_{V})	−5.5

Orbit
Primary	A
Name	B
Period (P)	137.52±0.04 days
Semi-major axis (a)	1.11±0.03 AU
Eccentricity (e)	0
Periastron epoch (T)	56,725.5±0.9
Semi-amplitude (K_{1}) (primary)	4.75±0.15 km/s

Details

A
Mass	8.8±0.5 M_{☉}
Radius	54±7 R_{☉}
Luminosity	12,600+3,300 −2,600 L_{☉}
Surface gravity (log g)	1.9±0.1 cgs
Temperature	8,500±500 K
Rotational velocity (v sin i)	35±5 km/s

B
Mass	0.75±0.25 M_{☉}
Radius	0.3 R_{☉}
Surface gravity (log g)	5.0 cgs
Temperature	50,000 K

Other designations
- l Puppis, GSC 06552-03228, HD 62623, HIP 37677, HR 2996, SAO 174400, CD−28°4774

Database references
SIMBAD	data

3 Puppis (3 Pup) is a spectroscopic binary in the constellation Puppis. It is a very rare A[e] supergiant, referred to as a B[e] star despite its spectral classification, and its apparent magnitude is 3.93.

3 Puppis is surrounded by a disc of circumstellar dust, which is unusual for an A-type star. It is caused by a low mass companion, a helium-rich subdwarf that is transferring mass to the supergiant. Due to mass transfer, its mass reduced from 3.6 M_{☉} when it formed to the current 0.75 M_{☉}. Like most B[e] stars, 3 Pup rotates rapidly, at 20% (Note: Calculated from rotational velocity divided by critical velocity, 35/178 = 0.20.) of the speed at which it would start to break apart. The disc has its inner edge only 3.8 AU from the primary star and it is suspected that deceleration of the hot primary stellar wind by the companion allows the dust to form unusually close to such a luminous star.
