= HD 59635 =

Triple star system

Observation data Epoch J2000.0 Equinox ICRS
- Constellation: Puppis
- Right ascension: 07^{h} 29^{m} 05.7^{s}
- Declination: −38° 48′ 44″
- Apparent magnitude (V): 5.43

Characteristics
- Spectral type: B5Vp
- B−V color index: −0.16

Astrometry

Other designations
- y^{1} Puppis, SAO 198045, HD 59635, HR 2875, CD−38°3400

Database references
SIMBAD	data

HD 59635 is a triple star system in the Puppis constellation. It has the Bayer designation of y^{1} Puppis, though it is usually just referred to as y Puppis. It has an apparent magnitude of 5.43. It is located at galactic longitude 251.64 and galactic latitude -9.93. The system is made up of two B-type main sequence stars in an eccentric 15-day orbit, with a white dwarf in a wider orbit.
