= HD 60863 =

Star in the constellation Puppis

- Location of HD 60863 (circled)

Observation data Epoch J2000 Equinox ICRS
- Constellation: Puppis
- Right ascension: 07^{h} 35^{m} 22.89366^{s}
- Declination: −28° 22′ 09.5735″
- Apparent magnitude (V): 4.65

Characteristics
- Evolutionary stage: main sequence
- Spectral type: B8V
- U−B color index: −0.43
- B−V color index: −0.12

Astrometry
Radial velocity (R_{v})	+3.30 km/s
Proper motion (μ)	RA: −65.93 mas/yr Dec.: −19.73 mas/yr
Parallax (π)	14.72±0.67 mas
Distance	220 ± 10 ly (68 ± 3 pc)
Absolute magnitude (M_{V})	0.46

Details

Aa
Mass	3.1±0.1 M_{☉}
Radius	2.4 R_{☉}
Luminosity	120 L_{☉}
Surface gravity (log g)	4.29 cgs
Temperature	12,680 K
Rotational velocity (v sin i)	203 km/s
Age	110+50 −20 Myr

Ab
Mass	0.58+0.00 −0.03 M_{☉}
Radius	0.54 R_{☉}
Temperature	4,000 K

Other designations
- p Puppis, CD−28°4566, CCDM J07354-2823A, GC 10178, GSC 06551-03461, HIP 36917, HR 2922, HD 60863, SAO 174058, WDS J07354-2822A

Database references
SIMBAD	data

p Puppis (HD 60863) is a star system the constellation Puppis. This system consists of a B8V (blue main-sequence) star and a secondary star at 7.4 AU, much smaller than the primary, as well as farther companions. Its apparent magnitude is 4.65 and it is approximately 222 light years away based on parallax.

In addition to the inner pair, there are the distant companions HIP 36890, at apparent magnitude 7.83 and projected separation of 38,700 AU, which is itself an astrometric binary, and a faint white dwarf at a distance of 1,300 AU. This make p Puppis a five-star system.
