= QZ Puppis =

Star in the constellation Puppis

- Location of QZ Puppis (circled)

Observation data Epoch J2000 Equinox ICRS
- Constellation: Puppis
- Right ascension: 07^{h} 52^{m} 38.64663^{s}
- Declination: −38° 51′ 46.1305″
- Apparent magnitude (V): 4.47 - 4.54

Characteristics
- Spectral type: B2.5V
- U−B color index: −0.68
- B−V color index: -0.20
- Variable type: ellipsoidal

Astrometry
Radial velocity (R_{v})	+29.50 km/s
Proper motion (μ)	RA: −8.92 mas/yr Dec.: +3.34 mas/yr
Parallax (π)	5.03±0.19 mas
Distance	650 ± 20 ly (199 ± 8 pc)
Absolute magnitude (M_{V})	−2.00

Details
Mass	6.0 M_{☉}
Radius	7.3 R_{☉}
Luminosity	2,268 L_{☉}
Surface gravity (log g)	3.5 cgs
Temperature	15,254 K
Metallicity [Fe/H]	−0.15 dex
Rotational velocity (v sin i)	151 km/s
Age	24.1 Myr

Other designations
- b Puppis, QZ Pup, CD−38°3769, GC 10661, GSC 07646-03591, HIP 38455, HR 3084, HD 64503, NSV 3789, SAO 198545

Database references
SIMBAD	data

QZ Puppis (QZ Pup, b Pup) is a class B2.5V (blue main-sequence) star in the constellation Puppis. Its apparent magnitude is 4.5 and it is approximately 650 light years away based on parallax.

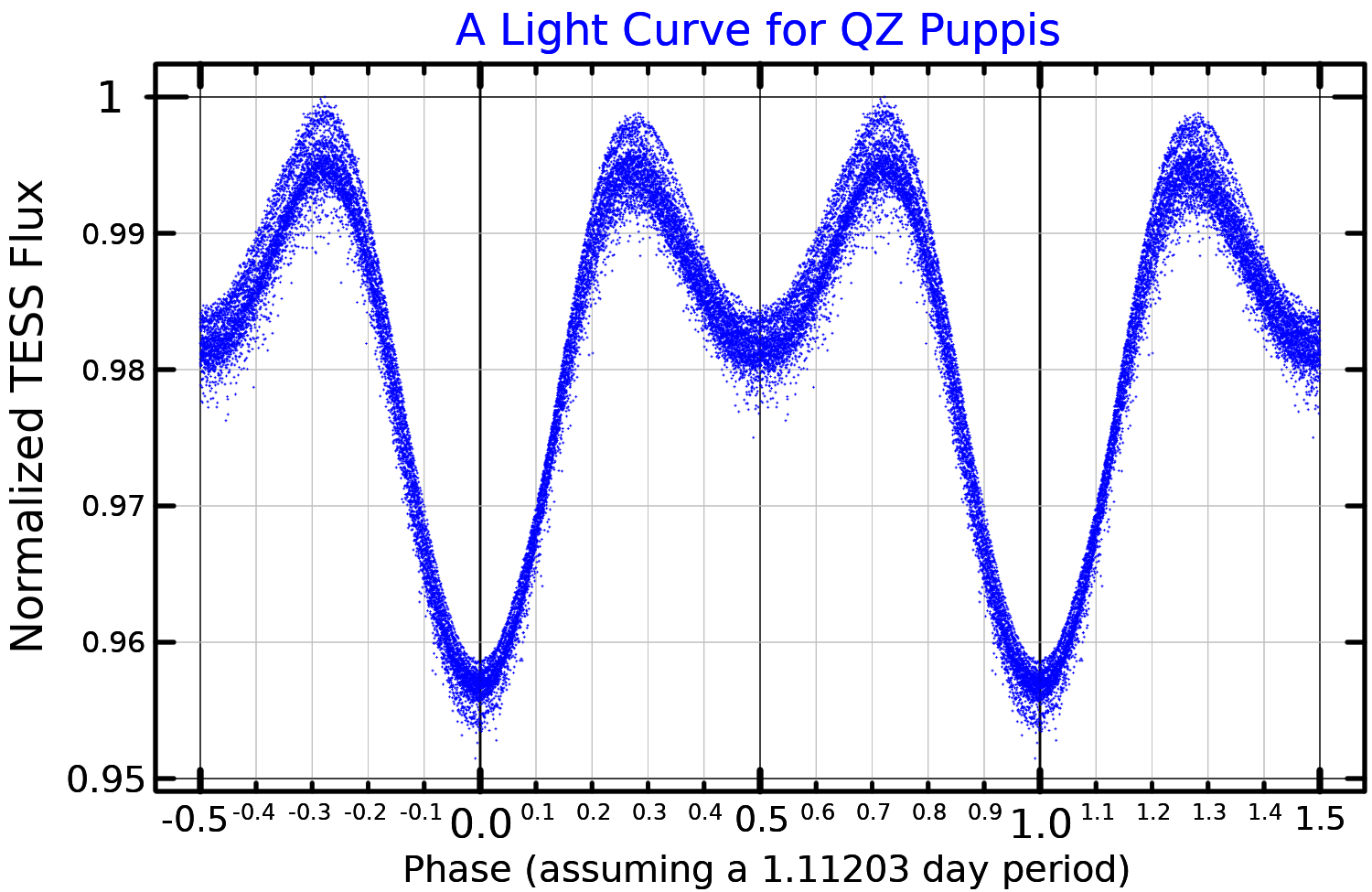
A light curve for QZ Puppis, plotted from TESS data

QZ Puppis was identified as a small-amplitude variable star in 1974, but the nature of the variability was unclear. It was thought to be a spectroscopic binary on the basis of variability in the radial velocity of its spectral lines. As a hot B-class main sequence star with variable spectral lines, it was suspected of being a β Cephei variable but this classification was repeatedly rejected. The short-period sinusoidal variations in brightness with an amplitude of 0.03 magnitudes were interpreted as ellipsoidal variations as the star, distorted by a close companion, rotates with a period of 1.1 days. Later analysis of Hipparcos photometry detected shallow eclipses.

The companion to QZ Puppis is only known from its effect on the visible star as they orbit. The primary shows radial velocity variations of 71 km/s as it orbits every 1.112 days.
