= HD 61330 =

Star in the constellation Puppis

- Location of HD 61330 (circled)

Observation data Epoch J2000 Equinox ICRS
- Constellation: Puppis
- Right ascension: 07^{h} 37^{m} 22.10978^{s}
- Declination: −34° 58′ 06.7109″
- Apparent magnitude (V): 4.53 + 6.87

Characteristics
- Evolutionary stage: main sequence
- Spectral type: B8IV
- U−B color index: −0.31
- B−V color index: −0.09

Astrometry
Radial velocity (R_{v})	+24.00 km/s
Proper motion (μ)	RA: −14.21 mas/yr Dec.: +16.32 mas/yr
Parallax (π)	9.05±0.40 mas
Distance	360 ± 20 ly (110 ± 5 pc)
Absolute magnitude (M_{V})	−0.68

Orbit
Period (P)	78.38±2.00 yr
Semi-major axis (a)	0.322±0.003″
Eccentricity (e)	0.655±0.005
Inclination (i)	152.9±5.0°
Longitude of the node (Ω)	74.7±5.0°
Periastron epoch (T)	2016.754±0.500
Argument of periastron (ω) (secondary)	208.4±5.0°

Details

f Pup A
Mass	3.32±0.15 M_{☉}
Luminosity	270 L_{☉}
Temperature	11,480 K
Rotational velocity (v sin i)	56 km/s

f Pup C
Mass	2.11±0.10 M_{☉}

Other designations
- f Puppis, CD−34°3755, CCDM J07374-3458ABC, FK5 290, GC 10246, GSC 07113-03280, HIP 37096, HR 2937, HD 61330, SAO 198195, WDS J07374-3458AB,C

Database references
SIMBAD	data

HD 61330 (f Puppis) is a binary star in the constellation Puppis. Its apparent magnitude is 4.53 and it is approximately 360 light years away based on parallax.

The primary and secondary, with respective labels A and C, take 78 years to complete an orbit, with a considerable eccentricity of 0.655. Another closer component, B, has been reported at 6.1 magnitude and 0.1" separation, but subsequent observers have repeatedly failed to confirm it.
