= HD 63922 =

Binary star system in the constellation Puppis

- Location of HD 63922 (circled)

Observation data Epoch J2000 Equinox ICRS
- Constellation: Puppis
- Right ascension: 07^{h} 49^{m} 14.29536^{s}
- Declination: −46° 22′ 23.5422″
- Apparent magnitude (V): 4.11

Characteristics
- Spectral type: B0III
- U−B color index: −1.01
- B−V color index: −0.18

Astrometry
Radial velocity (R_{v})	+24.00 km/s
Proper motion (μ)	RA: −4.37 mas/yr Dec.: +8.66 mas/yr
Parallax (π)	1.98±0.28 mas
Distance	approx. 1,600 ly (approx. 510 pc)
Absolute magnitude (M_{V})	−4.37

Details
Mass	19.3 M_{☉}
Radius	10.3 R_{☉}
Luminosity	63,096 L_{☉}
Surface gravity (log g)	3.95 cgs
Temperature	31,200 K
Metallicity [Fe/H]	+0.16 dex
Rotational velocity (v sin i)	40 km/s
Age	8.0 Myr

Other designations
- P Puppis, CD−46°3458, CCDM J07493-4622A, GC 10576, GSC 08134-03515, HIP 38164, HR 3055, HD 63922, SAO 219035, WDS J07492-4622Aa,Ab

Database references
SIMBAD	data

HD 63922 is a class B0III (blue giant) star in the constellation Puppis. Its apparent magnitude is 4.11 and it is approximately 1600 light years away based on parallax.

It is a multiple star; the primary has one close companion, Ab, at 0.3" separation and magnitude 7.19, and a more distant one, B, at 59.1" and 8.79 magnitude.

A loose agglomerate of stars around P Puppis was identified in 2008 as a young open cluster. Ten member stars were identified, including P Puppis itself and the naked-eye stars QS Puppis and HD 63578. The cluster is part of the Vela OB2 association and at least 32 members have since been identified. It is thought that the cluster is only about 10 million years old.
