= PU Puppis =

Blue-giant star in the constellation Puppis

- Location of PU Puppis (circled)

Observation data Epoch J2000 Equinox ICRS
- Constellation: Puppis
- Right ascension: 07^{h} 38^{m} 18.04541^{s}
- Declination: −25° 21′ 53.3017″
- Apparent magnitude (V): 4.69 to 4.75

Characteristics
- Spectral type: B8III
- U−B color index: −0.35
- B−V color index: −0.11
- Variable type: β Lyr

Astrometry
Radial velocity (R_{v})	+41.00 km/s
Proper motion (μ)	RA: −3.03 mas/yr Dec.: −7.42 mas/yr
Parallax (π)	5.27±0.26 mas
Distance	620 ± 30 ly (190 ± 9 pc)
Absolute magnitude (M_{V})	−1.80±0.25 (−1.77 + 5.85)
Absolute bolometric magnitude (M_{bol})	−2.35 + 5.54

Orbit
Period (P)	2.58237±0.00005 d
Semi-major axis (a)	13.30 ± 0.40 R_{☉}
Inclination (i)	56.2°

Details

PU Pup A
Mass	4.10±0.20 M_{☉}
Radius	6.60±0.30 R_{☉}
Luminosity	695±80 L_{☉}
Surface gravity (log g)	3.40±0.05 cgs
Temperature	11,500±500 K
Rotational velocity (v sin i)	123 km/s

PU Pup B
Mass	0.65±0.05 M_{☉}
Radius	0.90±0.10 R_{☉}
Luminosity	0.50±0.10 L_{☉}
Surface gravity (log g)	4.30±0.10 cgs
Temperature	5,000±350 K

Other designations
- m Puppis, PU Pup, CD−25°4828, CCDM J07383-2522AB, GC 10266, HIP 37173, HR 2944, HD 61429, SAO 174175, WDS J07383-2522AB

Database references
SIMBAD	data

PU Puppis (PU Pup) is a class B8III (blue giant) star in the constellation Puppis. Its apparent magnitude is about 4.7 and it is approximately 620 light years away based on parallax.

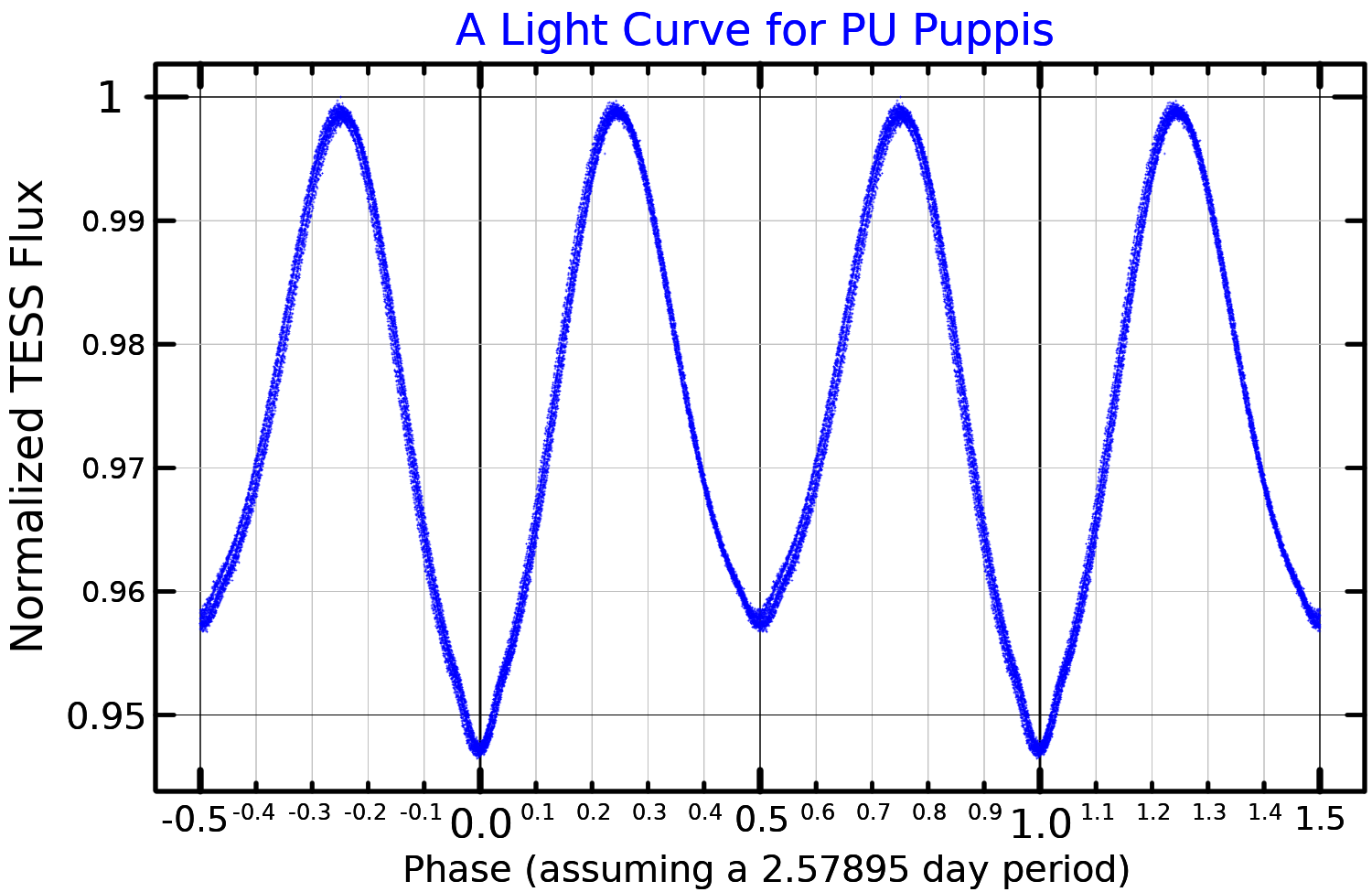
A light curve for PU Puppis, plotted from TESS data

It is a β Lyrae variable, ranging from 4.69 to 4.75 magnitude with a period of 2.58 days. The secondary is estimated at 5.6 magnitude, although recent observations have failed to confirm it. The primary has a mass of 4.10 solar masses, and is radiating at an effective temperature of 11,500 K. The secondary, with a mass 65% that of the Sun, has a surface temperature of about 5,000 K.
