= HD 70060 =

Star in the constellation Puppis

- Location of HD 70060 (circled)

Observation data Epoch J2000 Equinox ICRS
- Constellation: Puppis
- Right ascension: 08^{h} 18^{m} 33.31299^{s}
- Declination: −36° 39′ 33.4391″
- Apparent magnitude (V): 4.45

Characteristics
- Evolutionary stage: main sequence
- Spectral type: A8V
- U−B color index: +0.11
- B−V color index: +0.22

Astrometry
Radial velocity (R_{v})	+6.40 km/s
Proper motion (μ)	RA: -110.33 mas/yr Dec.: +100.48 mas/yr
Parallax (π)	34.93±0.18 mas
Distance	93.4 ± 0.5 ly (28.6 ± 0.1 pc)
Absolute magnitude (M_{V})	2.16

Details
Mass	1.62 M_{☉}
Radius	1.8 R_{☉}
Luminosity	11.39 L_{☉}
Surface gravity (log g)	4.28 cgs
Temperature	7,986 K
Metallicity [Fe/H]	-0.02 dex
Rotational velocity (v sin i)	129 km/s

Other designations
- q Puppis, CD−36°4449, FK5 313, GC 11343, GJ 1109, GJ 9261, HD 70060, HIP 40706, HR 3270, SAO 199070, GSC 07134-02967

Database references
SIMBAD	data

HD 70060 is a class A8V (white main-sequence) star in the constellation Puppis. Its apparent magnitude is 4.45 and it is approximately 93.4 light years away based on parallax.
