= HD 63744 =

Star in the constellation Puppis

- Location of HD 63744 (circled)

Observation data Epoch J2000 Equinox ICRS
- Constellation: Puppis
- Right ascension: 07^{h} 48^{m} 20.16042^{s}
- Declination: −47° 04′ 39.7985″
- Apparent magnitude (V): 4.71

Characteristics
- Spectral type: K0III
- U−B color index: +0.92
- B−V color index: +1.06

Astrometry
Radial velocity (R_{v})	−1.20 km/s
Proper motion (μ)	RA: −101.85 mas/yr Dec.: −78.08 mas/yr
Parallax (π)	14.04±0.16 mas
Distance	232 ± 3 ly (71.2 ± 0.8 pc)
Absolute magnitude (M_{V})	+0.43

Details
Mass	1.27 M_{☉}
Radius	13 R_{☉}
Luminosity	84.48 L_{☉}
Surface gravity (log g)	2.34 cgs
Temperature	4,750 K
Metallicity [Fe/H]	-0.02 dex
Rotational velocity (v sin i)	< 1.0 km/s

Other designations
- Q Puppis, CD−46°3451, GC 10553, GSC 08138-03767, HIP 38089, HR 3046, HD 63744, SAO 219018

Database references
SIMBAD	data

HD 63744 is a class K0III (orange giant) star in the constellation Puppis. Its apparent magnitude is 4.71 and it is approximately 232 light years away based on parallax.
