= PT Puppis =

Star in the constellation Puppis

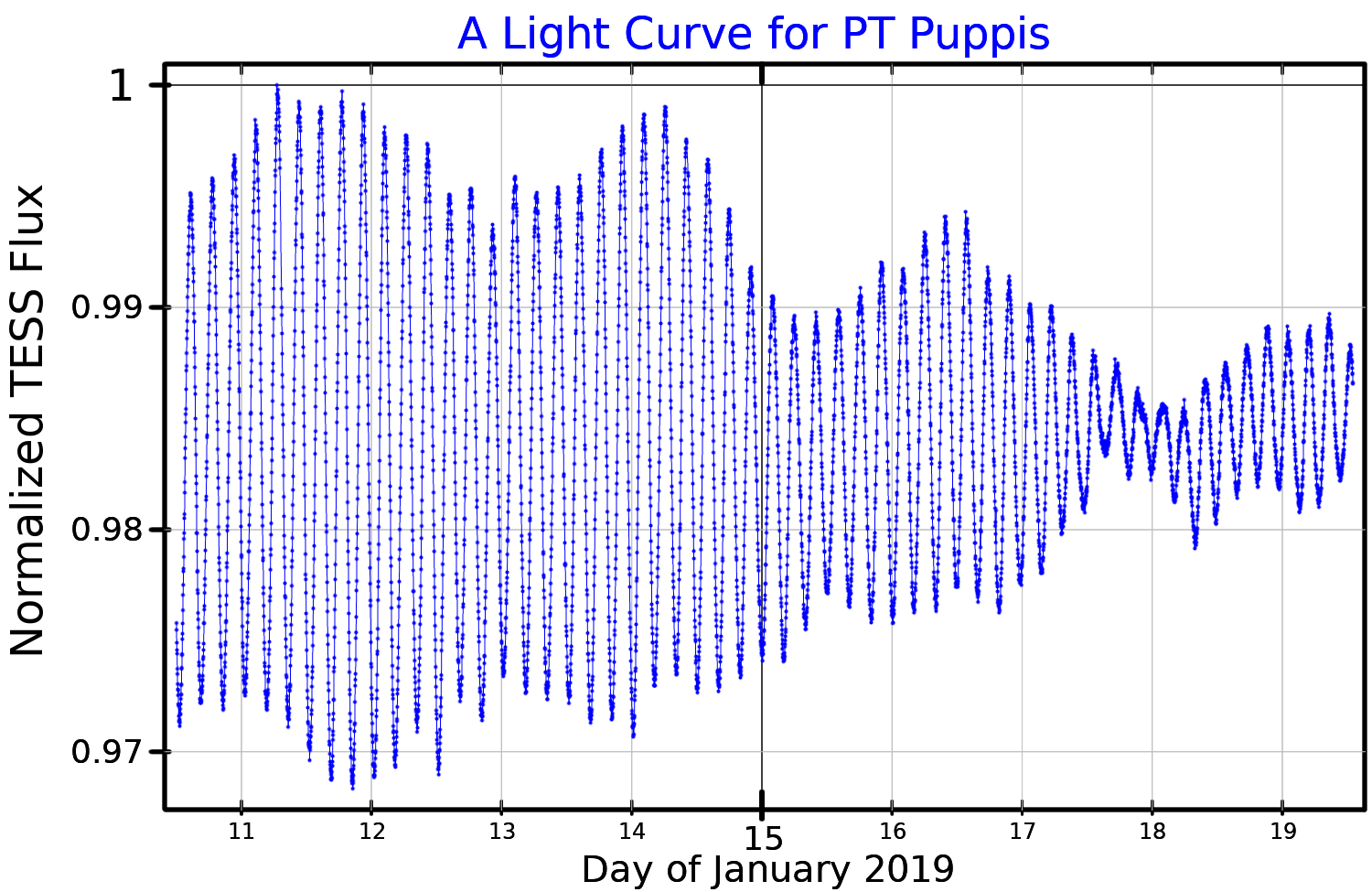
- A light curve for PT Puppis, plotted from TESS data

Observation data Epoch J2000 Equinox ICRS
- Constellation: Puppis
- Right ascension: 07^{h} 36^{m} 41.03388^{s}
- Declination: −19° 42′ 08.4211″
- Apparent magnitude (V): 5.720–5.740

Characteristics
- Spectral type: B2 II
- Variable type: Beta Cephei

Astrometry
Radial velocity (R_{v})	+22.00 ± 4.3 km/s
Proper motion (μ)	RA: −7.86 ± 0.21 mas/yr Dec.: 5.81 ± 0.20 mas/yr
Parallax (π)	1.93±0.28 mas
Distance	approx. 1,700 ly (approx. 520 pc)

Details
Mass	7.94 M_{☉}
Luminosity	6405 L_{☉}
Temperature	19400 K

Other designations
- PT Puppis, HR 2928, HD 61068, HIP 37036, SAO 153149

Database references
SIMBAD	data

PT Puppis (PT Pup) is a star in the constellation Puppis. Anamarija Stankov confirmed this star as a Beta Cephei variable. Analysis of its spectrum and allowing for extinction gives a mass 7.94 times that of the Sun, a surface temperature of 19,400 K and luminosity of 6405 Suns.

The star was discovered to be variable by Janet Rountree Lesh and P. R. Wesselius in 1979. It was given its variable star designation in 1981.
