= Messier 47 =

Open cluster in the constellation Puppis

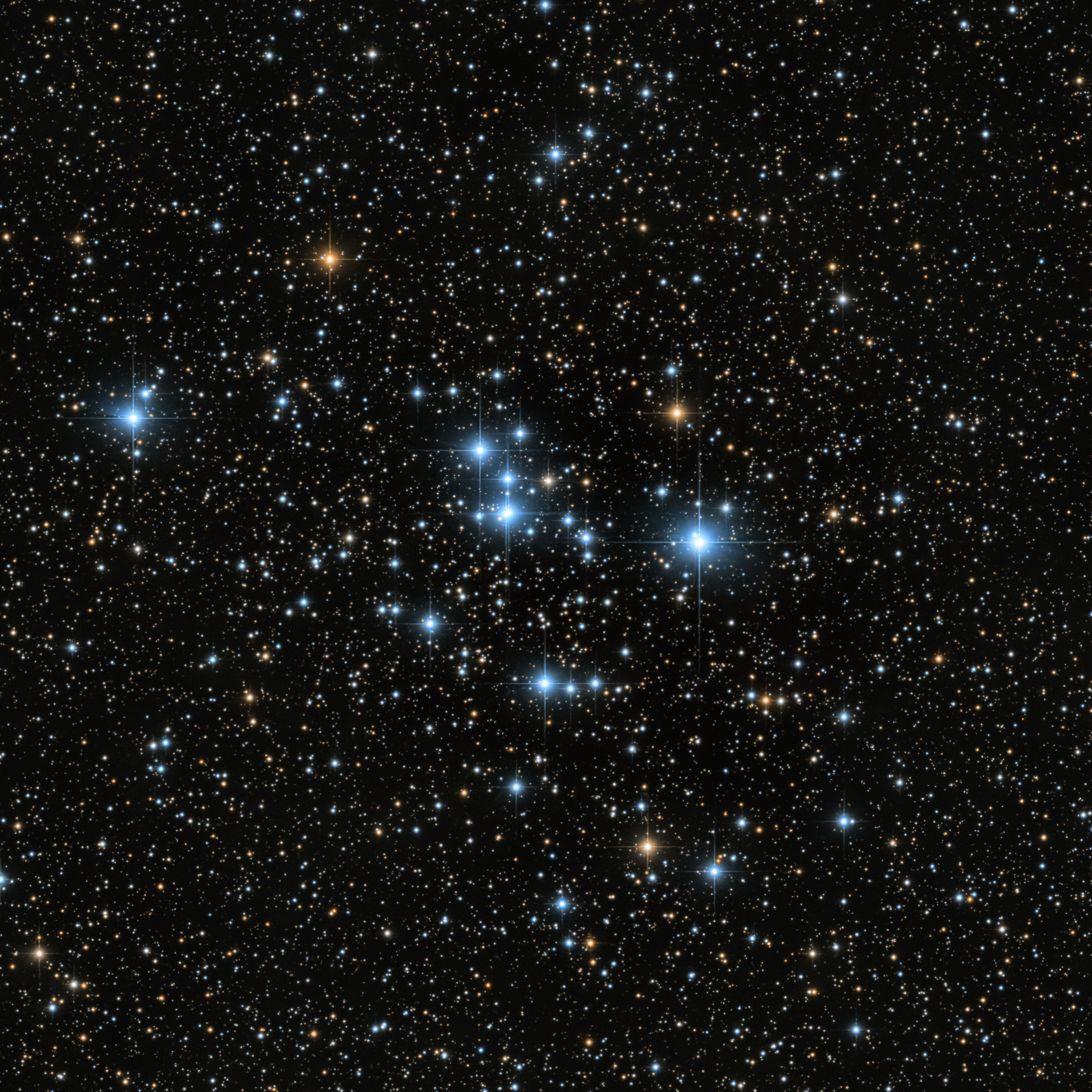
- Open cluster Messier 47

Observation data (J2000.0 epoch)
- Right ascension: 07^{h} 36.6^{m}
- Declination: −14° 30′
- Distance: 498 pc
- Apparent magnitude (V): 4.4
- Apparent dimensions (V): 30′

Physical characteristics
- Mass: 453 M_{☉}
- Radius: 10.61 pc
- Estimated age: 78 million years
- Other designations: NGC 2422, NGC 2478, Cr 152

Associations

Messier 47 (M47 or NGC 2422), also known as NGC 2478 is an open cluster in the southern constellation of Puppis. It was discovered by Giovanni Batista Hodierna before 1654 and re-discovered by Charles Messier in 1771. It was also independently discovered by Caroline Herschel.

There is no cluster in the position indicated by Messier, which he expressed in terms of its right ascension and declination with respect to the star 2 Puppis. However, if the signs (+ and −) that he wrote are swapped, the position matches. Until that equivalency was found, M47 was considered a lost Messier Object. The identification was made in 1959 by Canadian astronomer T. F. Morris.

M47 is about 1,600 light-years away and is about 78 million years old. The member stars have been measured down to red dwarfs at apparent magnitude 19. There are around 500 members, the brightest being HD 60855, a magnitude 5.7 Be star. The cluster is dominated by hot class B main sequence and giant stars, but a noticeable colour contrast comes from its brightest red giants.

It about a degree from Messier 46, which is much older and much further away.

== See also ==
- List of Messier objects
