= HD 50138 =

Star in the constellation Monoceros

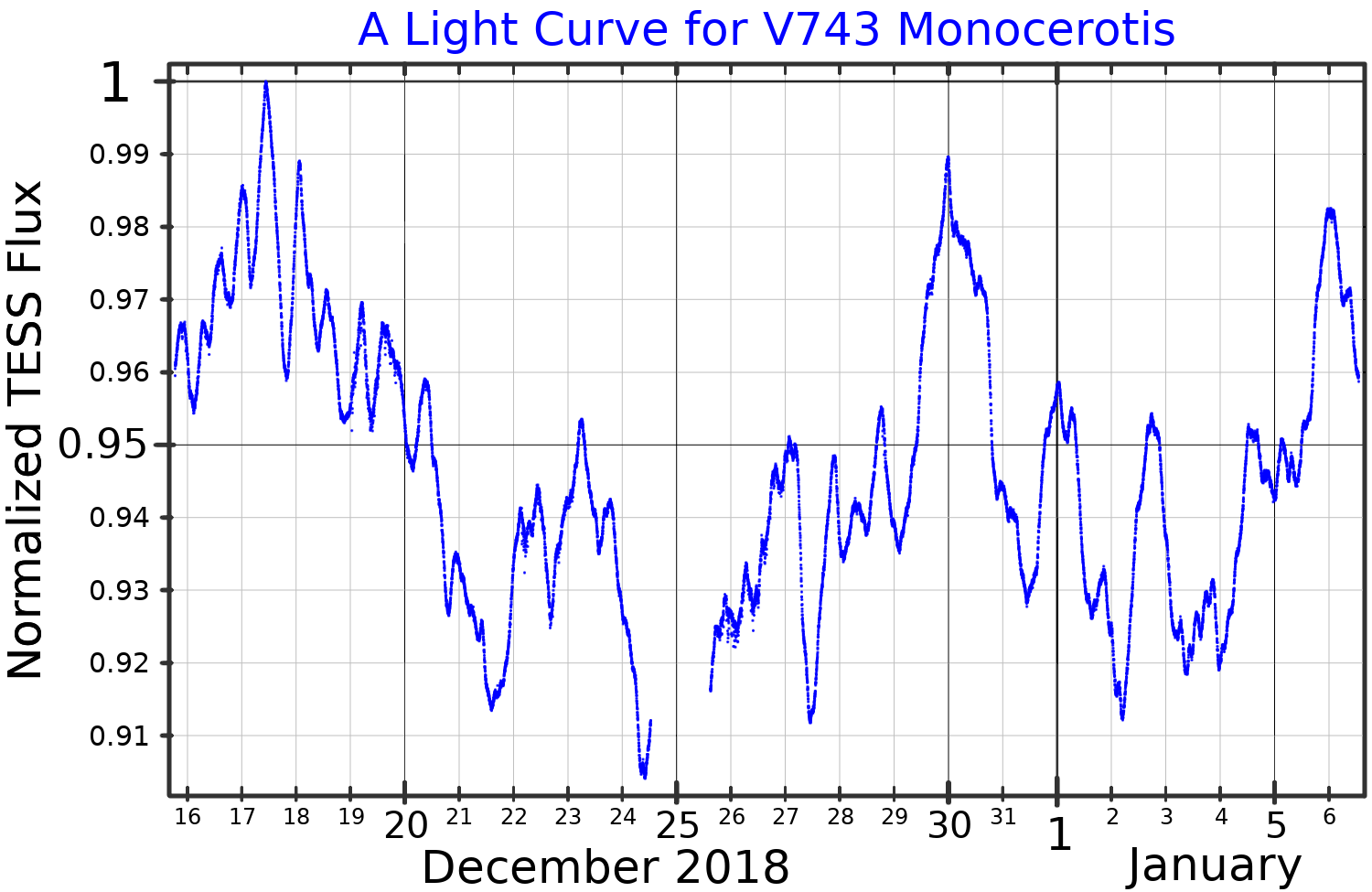
- A light curve for V743 Monocerotis (HD 50138), plotted from TESS data.

Observation data Epoch J2000 Equinox J2000
- Constellation: Monoceros
- Right ascension: 06^{h} 51^{m} 33.399^{s}
- Declination: −06° 57′ 59.45″
- Apparent magnitude (V): 6.58

Characteristics
- Spectral type: B6-7III-V[e]
- B−V color index: 0.030±0.008
- Variable type: γ Cas or FS CMa

Astrometry
Radial velocity (R_{v})	40.8±0.2 km/s
Proper motion (μ)	RA: −3.678 mas/yr Dec.: 4.178 mas/yr
Parallax (π)	2.8487±0.0459 mas
Distance	1,140 ± 20 ly (351 ± 6 pc)
Absolute magnitude (M_{V})	0.22

Details
Mass	6 M_{☉}
Radius	7.0±2.1 R_{☉}
Luminosity	(1.2±0.4)×10^{3} L_{☉}
Surface gravity (log g)	4.63±0.16 cgs
Temperature	6,391±241; 13,000 K
Metallicity [Fe/H]	0.18±0.04 dex
Rotational velocity (v sin i)	1.81389 km/s

Other designations
- MWC 158, V743 Mon, BD−06°1775, GC 8983, HD 50138, HIP 32923, SAO 133781, PPM 189615

Database references
SIMBAD	data

HD 50138 is a peculiar star in the equatorial constellation of Monoceros, the unicorn. It has the variable star designation V743 Monocerotis. The typical apparent visual magnitude of this star is 6.58, placing it near the lower limit for visibility to the naked eye. Based on parallax measurements, this star is located at a distance of approximately 1,140 light years. It is drifting further away with a heliocentric radial velocity of 41 km/s. This is an isolated star, being located far from any star forming region and having a low proper motion.

== Observations ==
In 1921 at the Mount Wilson Observatory, a search for B-type stars with Hydrogen-alpha emission lines identified HD 50138. P. W. Merrill classified it as a Be star with a spectral type of B8e. The structure of its bright hydrogen lines was found to vary with a period of around 12 days. This was revised in 1933 to two periods: the first is five years long and the second is thirty days. In 1949, Merrill noted the star displays a shell spectra, with narrow lines having been formed from a low density strata above the star's photosphere. Metallic lines were found to undergo significant variation in intensity, appearing to roughly vary as a group.

A radial velocity study of the star by V. Doazan in 1965 demonstrated that the star is surrounded by an expanding envelope. This expansion undergoes a variation with a period of around 50 days. D. A. Allen found an excess of infrared emission in 1973, and also noticed that the star is photometrically variable. A mass loss rate of 6.2×10^{−4} M_{☉}·yr^{−1} was reported in 1975. To explain the observations, a model was proposed consisting of a B8V class star surrounded by a shell of ionized hydrogen. It was also noticed how much the variable spectrum resembled that of AB Aurigae, a young Herbig Ae star. Based on the spectrum, HD 50138 was then classed as a B[e] star, in the same group as FS Canis Majoris.

In spite of its isolation from any star formation, the properties of this star continue to closely resemble a Herbig Be star. Some spectral features indicated the star is undergoing accretion. At the same time, the surrounding envelope showed gas expulsion in the outer regions. The envelope appears concentrated around the equator, suggesting an opaque circumstellar disk. The gas shell surrounding the star also appears to include local inhomogeneities or condensations. The morphology of the circumstellar environment within an astronomical unit of the star was found to vary on time scales of days or weeks. The formation of a new shell was observed around 1991.

Polarization measurements show that the star is also polarimetrically variable, which could be explained by a dusty disk or a binary companion. A binary system is a favored scenario for its classification as a FS Canis Majoris variable. The large amount of circumstellar matter can then be explained as a result of a mass transfer between the two stars. The companion may be much fainter than the primary, which is why it has not been detected. However, the changes in the circumstellar materials are difficult to explain with a binary model. Instead, the variability may be explained by an asymmetric disk with a hot spot. This asymmetry may be in the form of spiral arms or other features. The disk is inclined by about 56.6^{+2.3}_{−1.1}° to the plane of the sky with a position angle of 63.4^{+1.5}_{−3.4}°.

The large amount of circumstellar matter has made it difficult to obtain any direct information about the central star. But the star is most likely in an evolved state, rather than being pre-main-sequence.
