= L Puppis =

The Bayer designation L Puppis is shared by two stars in the constellation Puppis:

- L_{1} Puppis (OU Puppis), a chemically peculiar α² CVn variable
- L_{2} Puppis (HD 56096), a semiregular red giant

For technical reasons, l Puppis also links here. It is a distinct star:

- l Puppis (3 Puppis), a rare A[e] supergiant

== See also ==
J Puppis
