= B(e) star =

B-type star with forbidden emission lines

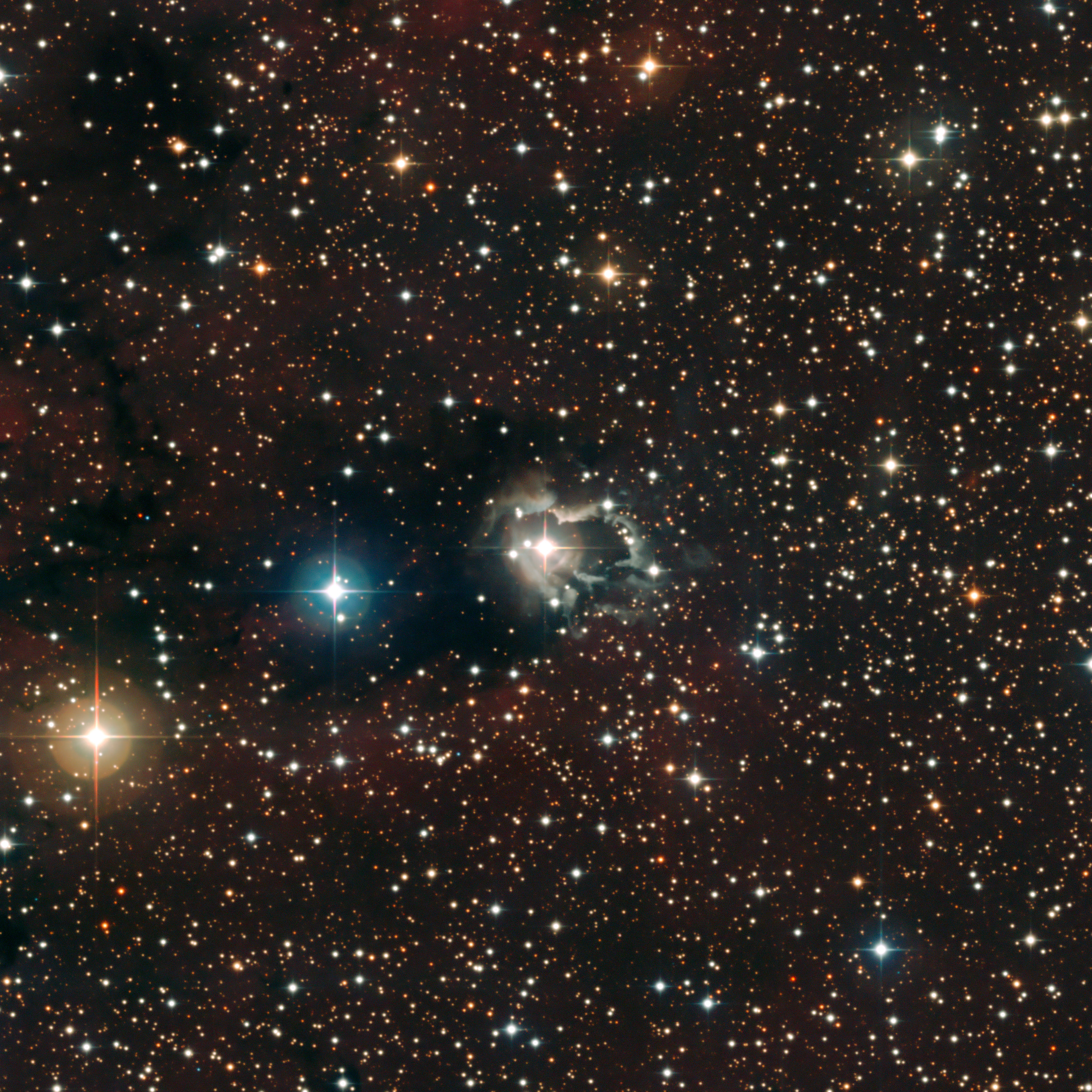
Nebulosity around the B[e] star HD 87643

A B[e] star, frequently called a B[e]-type star, is a B-type star with distinctive forbidden neutral or low ionisation emission lines in its spectrum. The designation results from combining the spectral class B, the lowercase e denoting emission in the spectral classification system, and the surrounding square brackets signifying forbidden lines. These stars frequently also show strong hydrogen emission lines, but this feature is present in a variety of other stars and is not sufficient to classify a B[e] object. Other observational characteristics include optical linear polarization and often infrared radiation that is much stronger than in ordinary B-class stars, called infrared excess. As the B[e] nature is transient, B[e]-type stars might exhibit a normal B-type spectrum at times, and hitherto normal B-type stars may become B[e]-type stars.

== Discovery ==
Many Be stars were discovered to have spectral peculiarities. One of these peculiarities was the presence of forbidden spectral lines of ionised iron and occasionally other elements.

In 1973 a study of one of these stars, HD 45677 or FS CMa, showed an infrared excess as well as forbidden lines of [O_{I}], [S_{II}], [Fe_{II}], [Ni_{II}], and many more.

In 1976 a study of Be stars with infrared excesses identified a subset of stars which showed forbidden emission lines from ionised iron and some other elements. These stars were all considered to be distinct from the classical main sequence Be stars, although they appeared to consist of a wide range of different types of star. The term B[e] star was coined to group these stars.

One type of B[e] star was readily identified as being highly luminous supergiants. By 1985, eight dust-shrouded B[e] supergiants were known in the Magellanic Clouds. Others were found to be definitely not supergiants. Some were binaries, others proto-planetary nebulae, and the term "B[e] phenomenon" was used to make it clear that different types of star could produce the same type of spectrum.

== Classification ==
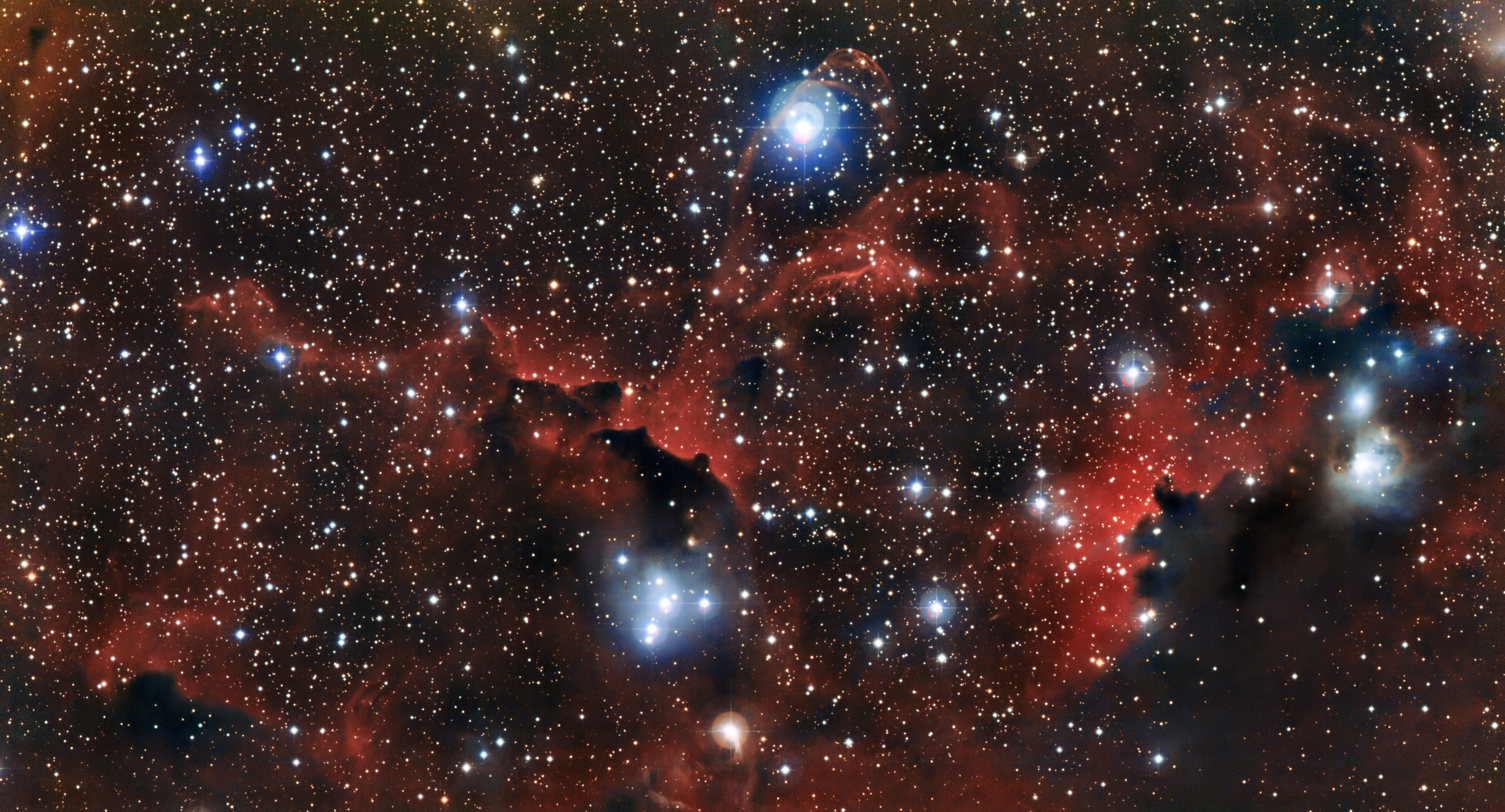
The Seagull Nebula is a roughly circular HII region centred on the Herbig Ae/Be star HD 53367.

Following the recognition that the B[e] phenomenon could occur in several distinct types of star, four sub-types were named:

- B[e] supergiants (sgB[e])
- pre-main sequence B[e] stars (HAeB[e]), a subset of the Herbig Ae/Be stars
- compact planetary nebulae B[e] stars (cPNB[e])
- symbiotic B[e] stars (SymB[e])

Around half of the known B[e] stars could not be placed in any of these groups and were called unclassified B[e] stars (unclB[e]). The unclB[e] stars have since been re-classified as FS CMa stars, a type of variable named for one of the earliest known B[e] stars.

== Nature ==
The forbidden emission, infrared excess, and other features indicative of the B[e] phenomenon, themselves provide strong hints at the nature of the stars. The stars are surrounded by ionised gas which produces intense emission lines in the same way as Be stars. The gas must be sufficiently extended to allow the formation of forbidden lines in the outer low density region, and also for dust to form which produces the infrared excess. These features are common to all the types of B[e] star.

The sgB[e] stars have hot fast winds which produce extended circumstellar material, plus a denser equatorial disc. HAeB[e] are surrounded by the remains of the molecular clouds which are forming the stars. Binary B[e] stars can produce discs of material as it is transferred from one star to another through roche lobe overflow. cPNB[e] are post-AGB stars that have shed their entire atmospheres after reaching the end of their lives as actively fusing stars. The FS CMa stars appear to be binaries with a rapidly rotating mass-losing component.

== Accretion as the source of circumstellar structures ==
A proposed binary-interaction mechanism for producing structured circumstellar material around some sgB[e] is the Lizard Autotomy Effect. In hydrodynamical simulations of the sgB[e] binary GG Carinae, the secondary star accretes part of the primary wind into a curved accretion tail. Near periastron, the orbital motion causes the primary star and its wind to cut this tail, producing gaps and an outward-moving spiral shell made of broken segments. The model has been suggested as a possible origin for spiral, ring-like, or fragmented circumstellar structures around some sgB[e] systems, and the transient accretion disc formed around the secondary may also provide conditions for jet launching and bipolar nebular shaping.

== See also ==
- Shell star
