= GG Carinae =

Binary star system

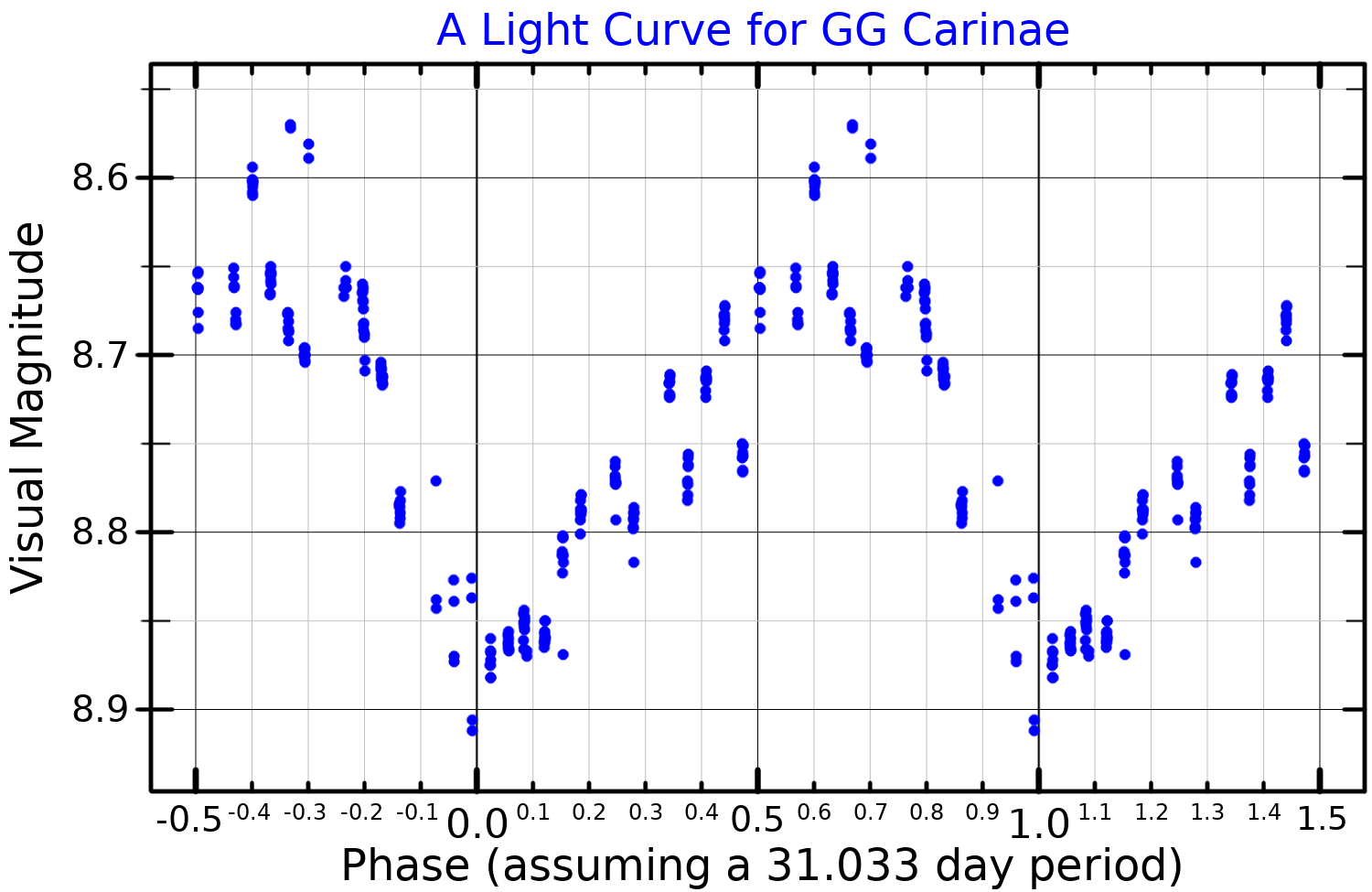
- A visual band light curve for GG Carinae, plotted from data published by Gosset et al. (1984)

Observation data Epoch J2000 Equinox ICRS
- Constellation: Carina
- Right ascension: 10^{h} 55^{m} 58.915^{s}
- Declination: −60° 23′ 33.44″
- Apparent magnitude (V): 8.67 (8.4 to 8.9)

Characteristics
- Evolutionary stage: Supergiant
- Spectral type: B0/2eq
- B−V color index: 0.552±0.025
- Variable type: Unique

Astrometry
Proper motion (μ)	RA: −6.966 mas/yr Dec.: 2.056 mas/yr
Parallax (π)	0.4079±0.0185 mas
Distance	8,000 ± 400 ly (2,500 ± 100 pc)
Absolute magnitude (M_{V})	−6.21

Orbit
Period (P)	31.01±0.01 d
Semi-major axis (a)	0.61±0.03 AU
Eccentricity (e)	0.50±0.03
Inclination (i)	60±20°
Periastron epoch (T)	2,452,069.36±1.30 JD
Argument of periastron (ω) (secondary)	339.87^{+3.10}_{−3.06}°
Semi-amplitude (K_{1}) (primary)	48.57+2.04 −1.87 km/s

Details

Supergiant
Mass	24±4 M_{☉}
Radius	27^{+9}_{−7} R_{☉}
Luminosity	1.8+1.0 −0.7×10^{5} L_{☉}
Temperature	23,000±2,000 K

Companion
Mass	7.2 M_{☉}

Other designations
- GG Car, CD−59°3425, CPD−59°2855, HD 94878, HIP 53444, SAO 251181, PPM 358340, WDS J10560-6024A

Database references
SIMBAD	data

GG Carinae is a binary star system in the southern constellation of Carina, abbreviated GG Car. It is a variable star with a brightness that fluctuates around an apparent visual magnitude of 8.67, making it too faint to be visible to the naked eye. The distance to this system is approximately 8,000 light years based on parallax measurements.

== Observations ==
This star was found to have a peculiar spectrum by W. P. Fleming in 1892, matching the profile of a P Cygni star with bright emission lines of hydrogen. In 1930, the brightness of the star was found to be variable by W. E. Kruytbosch, who determined a period of 31.043±0.014 d and suggested it may be both an eclipsing binary and intrinsically variable. This period was confirmed by D. Hoffleit in 1933. A near infrared excess was detected in 1973, indicating a circumstellar dust shell.

Analysis of the spectrum by C. A. Hernández and associates in 1981 suggested the star is surrounded by a thick, extended envelope that is concealing absorption lines formed in the stellar photosphere. They used measurements of radial velocity variations to estimate a period of 31.03 days. In 1984, E. Gosset and associates used photoelectric photometry to find a period of 31.020 days, but were convinced by the data that the orbital period is twice that value, or 62.039 days. GG Carinae was classified as a supergiant B[e] star by Henny Lamers and associates in 1998, based on properties similar to B[e] supergiants in the Magellanic Clouds.

In 2004, M. A. Machado and associates used high resolution spectral measurements to confirm that this is a binary system with intrinsic variability. M. Kraus detected an enriched abundance of carbon-13 (in the form of ^{13}CO) in the stellar wind, confirming that this is an evolved B[e] supergiant rather than a pre-main-sequence star. Kraus and associates in 2013 detected CO gas in a circumbinary ring, which was possibly placed there by the primary as a rapidly-spinning Be star. Alternatively, it may have come via Roche lobe overflow from the secondary member of the system, about which little is known. Brightness variations related to the orbital period are thought to be due to mass transfer between the components during periastron.

GG Carinae is almost certainly a member of the rich but faint open cluster ASCC 63, which is thought to have about 1,700 member stars. The cluster is calculated to be 18 million years old and 3,500 pc away.

== Accretion and circumstellar structure ==
Hydrodynamic simulations of GG Carinae have investigated how the primary star’s wind interacts with its lower-mass companion. The simulations indicate that the companion accretes material throughout the eccentric 31-day orbit, with the accretion rate peaking near periastron. The focused wind forms a curved accretion tail and, shortly after periastron, a temporary accretion disc around the secondary. The calculations suggest that the observed periodic photometric variability is caused primarily by absorption of the primary star’s light by dense material in the accretion tail and surrounding spiral structure, rather than by luminosity generated through accretion. The simulations predict a periodically disrupted spiral outflow and suggest that binary interaction may contribute to the formation and shaping of circumstellar material around GG Carinae and other B[e] supergiants.
