= HD 53367 =

Binary star system in the constellation Monoceros

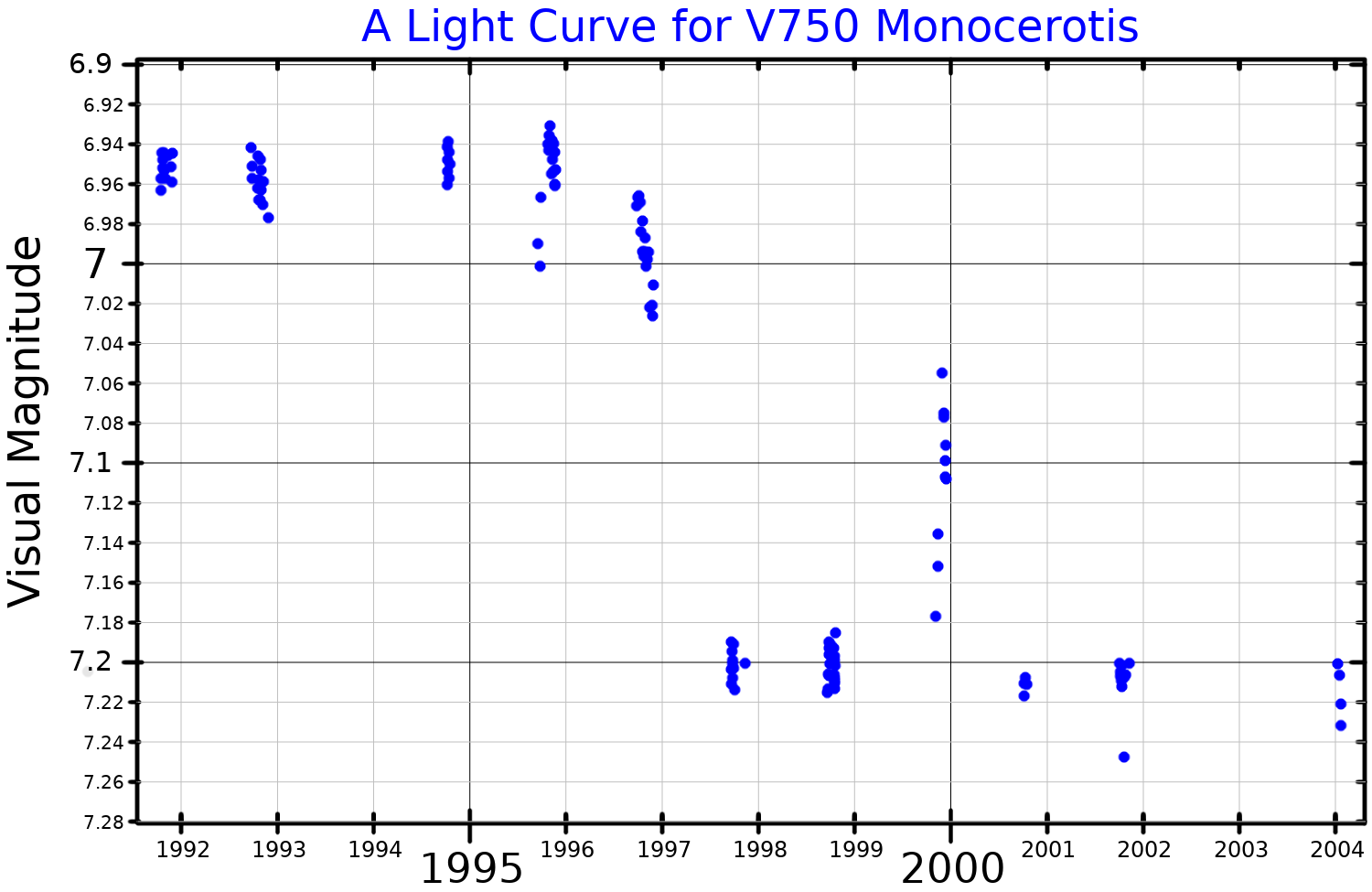
- A visual band light curve for V750 Monocerotis, adapted from Pogodin et al. (2006)

Observation data Epoch J2000 Equinox ICRS
- Constellation: Monoceros
- HD 53367A
- Right ascension: 07^{h} 04^{m} 25.5311^{s}
- Declination: −10° 27′ 15.753″
- Apparent magnitude (V): 7.36
- HD 53367B
- Right ascension: 07^{h} 04^{m} 25.4868^{s}
- Declination: −10° 27′ 15.400″
- Apparent magnitude (V): 8.41

Characteristics

HD 53367A
- Spectral type: B0IV/Ve

HD 53367B
- Spectral type: B1Ve

Astrometry

HD 53367A
| Proper motion (μ) | RA: −3.741 mas/yr Dec.: +1.772 mas/yr |
| Parallax (π) | 0.8199±0.2114 mas |
| Distance | 990±50 pc |

Orbit
| Primary | HD 53367Aa |
| Name | HD 53367Ab |
| Period (P) | 367.7 d |
| Semi-major axis (a) | 2.6 - 2.7 mas |
| Eccentricity (e) | 0.5 |
| Inclination (i) | 53.6 - 55.3° |
| Semi-amplitude (K_{1}) (primary) | 20.3 km/s |

Details

HD 53367Aa
| Mass | 12.19±2.18 M_{☉} |
| Radius | 4.2 - 4.3 R_{☉} |
| Luminosity | 11,000 L_{☉} |
| Surface gravity (log g) | 4.25 - 4.27 cgs |
| Temperature | 28,400 - 28,600 K |

HD 53367Ab
| Mass | 4.90±0.52 M_{☉} |
| Radius | 2.5 - 8.0 R_{☉} |
| Luminosity | 377 - 513 L_{☉} |
| Surface gravity (log g) | 3.32 - 4.34 cgs |
| Temperature | 9,000 - 17,500 K |
| Age | 0.7±0.2 Myr |

Other designations
- BD−10 1848, HD 53367, HIP 34116, SAO 152320, GSC 05385-02103, V750 Mon, 2MASS J07042551-1027156

Database references
| SIMBAD | data |

HD 53367 is a triple star system in the constellation of Monoceros. The primary star was identified as a variable Herbig Ae/Be star in 1989. Its companion, spectroscopically discovered in 2006, is a pre-main-sequence star with an average separation of 1.7 AU. The star system is embedded in the extended nebula IC 2177.

The binary HD 53367A is part of the hierarchical triple star system RST 3489, with an additional Herbig Ae/Be star HD 53367B of spectral class B1Ve at a projected separation of 0.6″. All stars in the system belong to the star-forming CMa OB1 association. The Hipparcos, Gaia Data Release 2, and Gaia Data Release 3 parallax values for HD 53367A are highly discrepant, but the system is thought to be about 1,000 parsecs away.

== Extended nebula ==
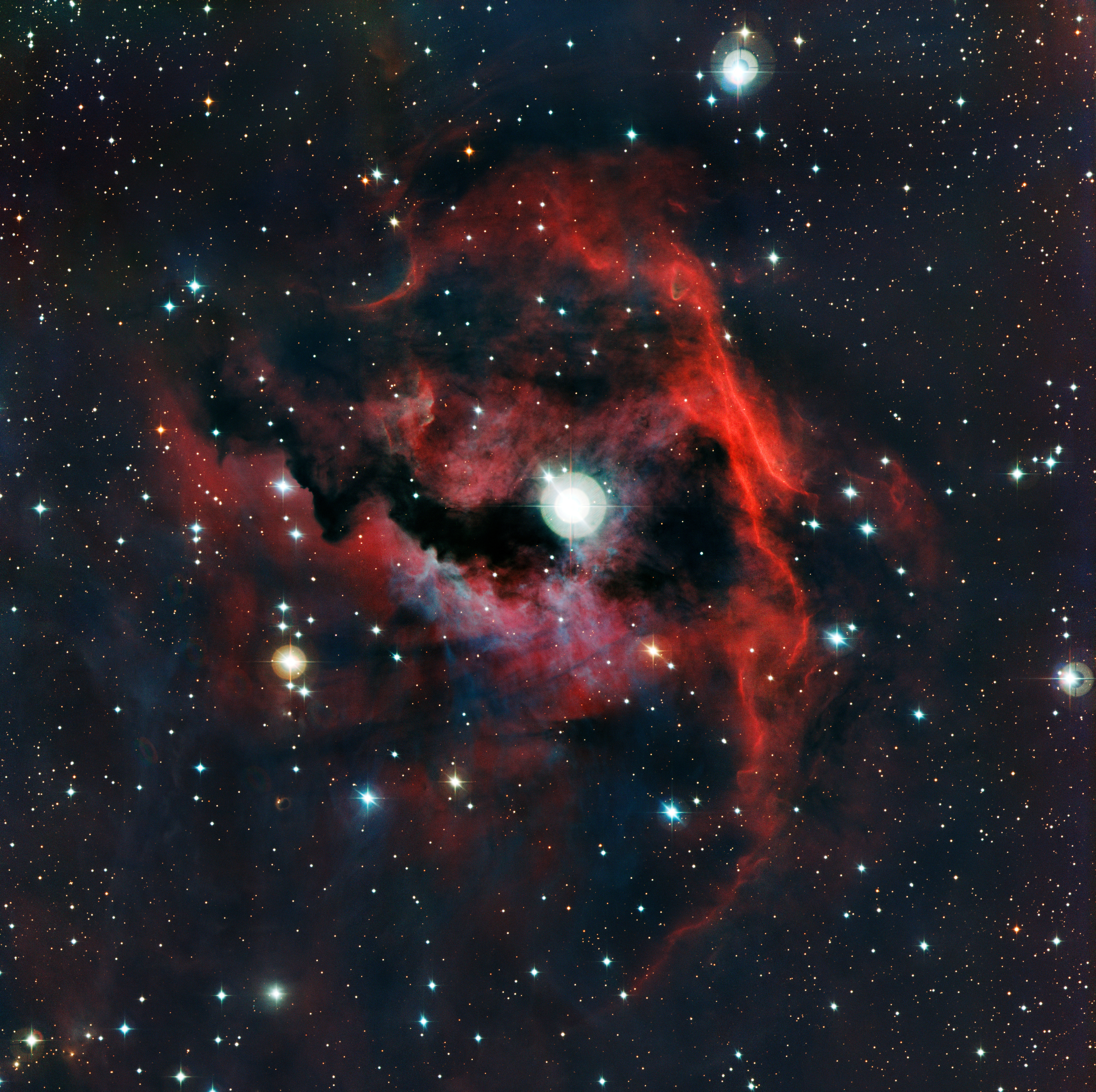
HD 53367 lies at the centre of IC 2177

HD 53367A is a very young and gas-rich system, with most of the gas still obscuring the secondary component HD 53367Ab.
