= AB Aurigae b =

Substellar object orbiting AB Aurigae

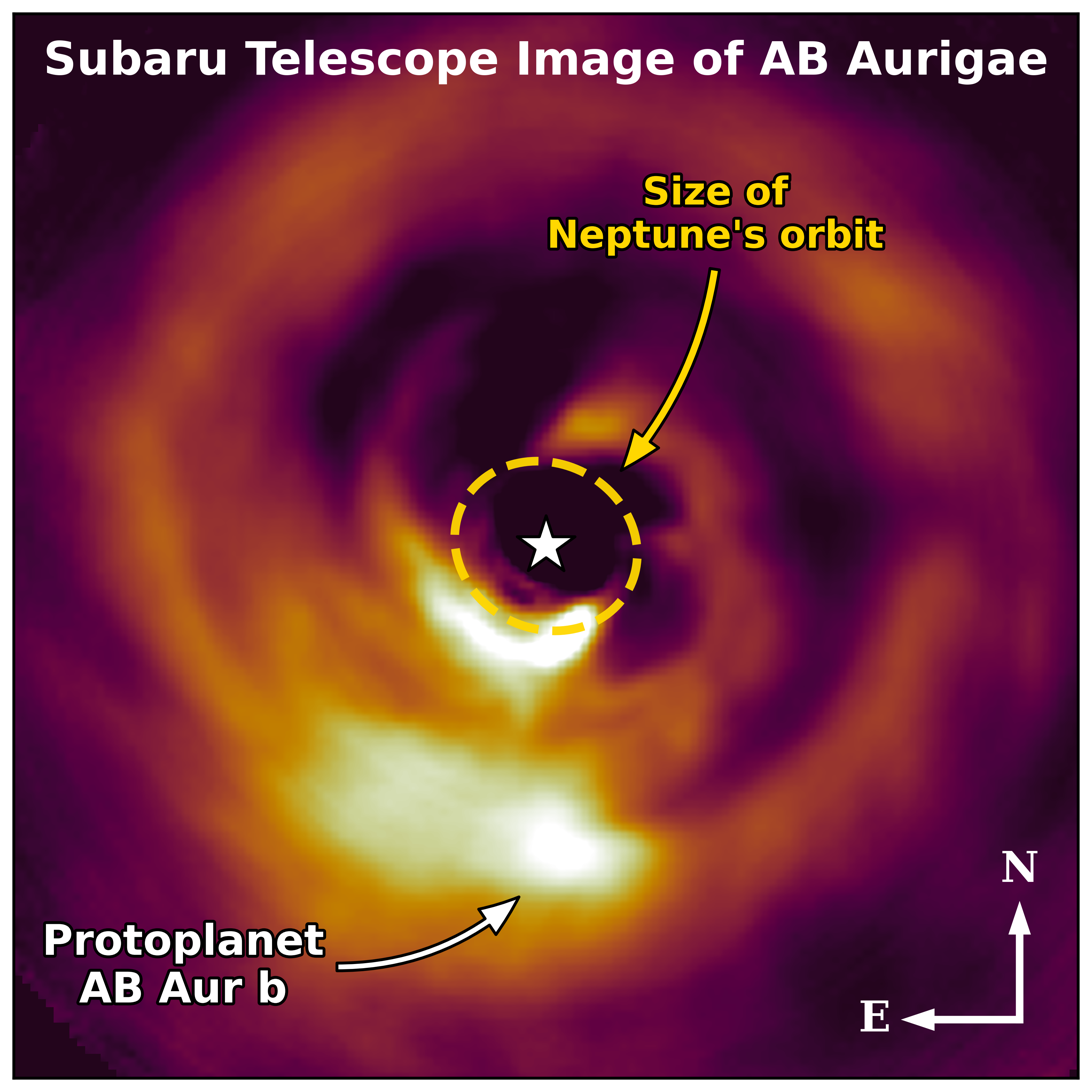
- Subaru Telescope detection of AB Aur b.

Discovery
- Discovered by: Currie et al.
- Discovery site: Subaru Telescope, Hubble Space Telescope
- Discovery date: April 4, 2022
- Detection method: Direct imaging

Orbital characteristics
- Semi-major axis: 44.6 – 143.2 AU
- Eccentricity: 0.19 – 0.60
- Inclination: 27.1 – 58.2
- Star: AB Aurigae

Physical characteristics
- Mean radius: 2.75 R_{J}
- Mass: 20 M_{J}
- Temperature: 2,000 – 2,500 K

AB Aurigae b is a directly imaged protoplanet or proto-brown dwarf embedded within the protoplanetary disk of the young, Herbig Ae/Be star AB Aurigae. The system is about 508 light-years away: AB Aur b is located at a projected separation of about 93 AU from its host star. It may provide evidence for the formation of gas giant planets by disk instability.

== Discovery and follow-up studies ==
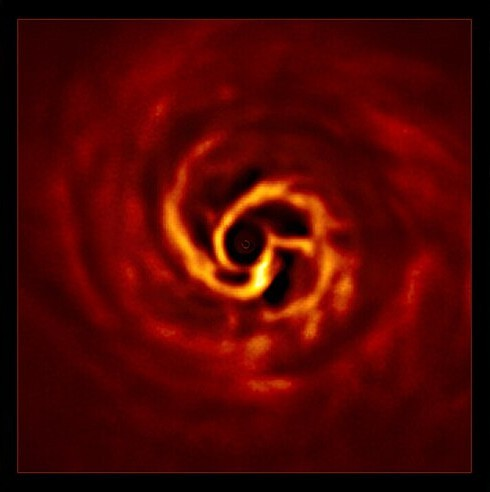
The inner region of protoplanetary disk of AB Aurigae as seen by the SPHERE instrument of the VLT in polarised light. It also shows the very-bright-yellow ‘twist’ where a planet is believed to be forming.

AB Aur b was discovered by a team led by Thayne Currie, Kellen Lawson, and Glenn Schneider using the Subaru Telescope on Mauna Kea, Hawaii and the Hubble Space Telescope (HST). The Subaru data utilized the observatory's extreme adaptive optics system, SCExAO, to correct for atmospheric blurring and the CHARIS integral field spectrograph to record AB Aur b's brightness measurements at different near-infrared wavelengths. AB Aur b's position coincides with the predicted location of a massive protoplanet required to explained CO gas spirals detected with ALMA and lies interior to the ring of pebble-sized dust seen in ALMA continuum data. The companion was initially detected in 2016: the team initially believed that the signal identified a piece of AB Aurigae's protoplanetary disk, not a newly forming planet. However, subsequent SCExAO/CHARIS data obtained with Subaru over the next four years showed that AB Aur b's spectrum is dissimilar to that of the protoplanetary disk, with a temperature similar to predicted values for a newly born planet. A new detection with HST using the STIS instrument and an archival detection with the now-decommissioned NICMOS instrument from 2007 confirmed evidence from Subaru data that AB Aur b orbits the star and is not a static feature.

The planet's existence was disputed by two studies in 2023. One study found that the ultraviolet and optical emission is consistent with scattered light and that this planet's existence would be superfluous. The other did not detected significant emission in Paβ wavelengths, which would be expected for an actively accreting protoplanet, suggesting AB Aurigae b is not actively accreting material or that it there is no protoplanet at all, but it was later found that the non-detection results from low-quality images as well as an inaccurate AB Aur b source model. Furthermore, the infrared spectral energy distribution is inconsistent with scattered light as found by another study in 2024.

== Emission source, morphology, and orbital properties ==
AB Aur b is detected in near-infrared wavelengths between 1.1 and 2.4 microns with SCExAO/CHARIS, at 1.1 microns with HST/NICMOS, and in unfiltered optical data with HST/STIS. The CHARIS and NICMOS data are consistent with interpreting AB Aur b as a 9 to 12 Jupiter-mass object with a radius of about 2.75 times that of Jupiter. It is also detected in H-alpha with the VAMPIRES instrument behind SCExAO, although it is unclear whether this detection originates from the protoplanet itself or surrounding scattered light.

The emission sources responsible for AB Aur b are subject of active investigation. Its H-alpha detection could be due to active accretion or scattered light. The discovery paper matches the protoplanet's emission using a composite model consisting of a 2000–2500 K thermal component responsible for the CHARIS and NICMOS detections and magnetospheric accretion that also contributes to its detection with STIS. AB Aur b is also detected in multiple other narrow UV-optical passbands. Analysis of these data suggests that at least its optical emission is also consistent with scattered light, but it was later found that the planet's SED is inconsistent with scattered light alone, and that the existence of a planet would be needed to explain the concentrated (as opposed to featureless) emission at 1.1–2.24 μm.

The companion appears as a bright, spatially-extended source approximately 0.6 arcseconds (about 93 AU) away from the star, which contrasts with the point source nature of all other directly imaged planets. This morphology is likely due to light from AB Aur b being intercepted and reprocessed by the star's protoplanetary disk. It is not clearly detected as a concentrated source in polarized light. Because of its very large distance from the star, AB Aur b's orbit is not well constrained. Modeling thus far suggests that the companion's orbit is inclined about 43 degrees from our line-of-sight, possibly coplanar with the star's protoplanetary disk.

One study compared the H-alpha emission of the star to the planet. The variable emission of the star will be scattered in the disk as a light echo, possibly influencing the brightness of the planet candidate. The observations with Hubble did however show that the star varied with only 15%, but the planet candidate varied with 330%. This excludes scattered light as the only source for AB Aur b's emission source. A shadowing effect or a physically evolving compact disk structure are not excluded.

== Formation ==
The commonly favored model for gas giant planet formation – core accretion – has significant difficulty forming massive gas giant planets at AB Aur b's very large distance from its host star. Instead, AB Aur b may be forming by disk (gravitational) instability, where as a massive disk around a star cools, gravity causes the disk to rapidly break up into one or more planet-mass fragments. The numerous spiral arms in AB Aur's protoplanetary disk are consistent with models of planet formation by disk instability.

A paper published in Nature in September 2024 reported observations of the disk around AB Aur made with ALMA that show evidence of gravitational instability in the disk.

== Characteristics ==
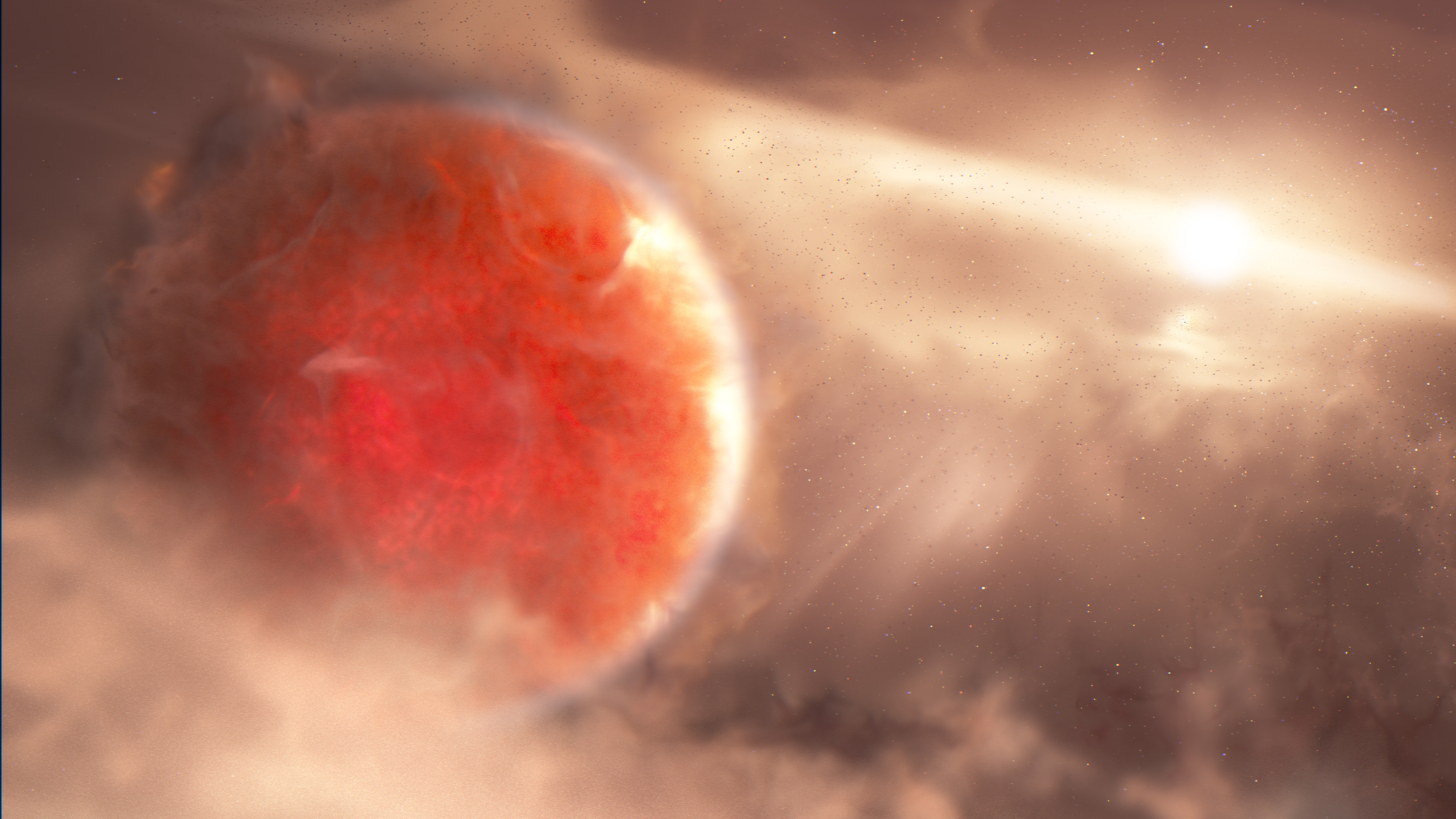
Artist impression of AB Aur b

AB Aurigae b has been estimated to have a radius 2.75 times that of Jupiter, an effective temperature of 2,200 Kelvin, and a surface gravity of 3.5 cgs, which is three times Earth's surface gravity. However, these estimated properties may not be reliable, as they might be affected by the planet's circumplanetary disk.

The mass of AB Aurigae b is likely in the brown dwarf regime. Assuming a hot-start evolutionary model and a planetary-mass (less than 13 M_{J}), AB Aurigae b would be younger than 3 million years to have its observed large luminosity (and hence radius). This is inconsistent with the age of AB Aurigae, determined at 6.0+2.5
−1.0 Myr, and could imply delayed planet formation in the disk. Another study gives a higher mass of 20 M_{J} for an age of 4 Myr, which is in the brown dwarf regime, arguing since gravitational instability of the disk (the preferred formation mechanism in the discovery publication) operates on very short time scales, it might be as old as the central star. On the other hand, the spectral energy distribution suggest a lower mass of 9 Jupiter masses, but this is uncertain as the observed spectrum might be that of the circumplanetary disk around the planet, and the apparent magnitude of the planet has been revised by a later study, which implies a larger mass of 20 M_{J}.

== In popular culture ==
The system AB Aurigae made a brief appearance in the 2021 film "Don't Look Up" during depicted Subaru observations, although the companion is not visible on the displayed image.
