= HD 87643 =

Binary star system in the constellation Carina

- HD 87643 is embedded in the faint nebulosity at the centre of this image. The red arc is NGC 3199, a Wolf–Rayet nebula around WR 18.

Observation data Epoch J2000 Equinox ICRS
- Constellation: Carina
- Right ascension: 10^{h} 04^{m} 30.2840^{s}
- Declination: −58° 39′ 52.091″
- Apparent magnitude (V): 7.4 - 9.8

Characteristics
- Spectral type: B3 I[e]
- U−B color index: −0.54
- B−V color index: +0.69
- Variable type: INA

Astrometry
Proper motion (μ)	RA: −7.557 mas/yr Dec.: +5.438 mas/yr
Parallax (π)	0.6293±0.1227 mas
Distance	approx. 5,000 ly (approx. 1,600 pc)
Absolute magnitude (M_{V})	−4.1

Details
Mass	25 M_{☉}
Luminosity	41,000 L_{☉}
Temperature	17,000 K

Other designations
- V640 Carinae, CD−58°3005, HD 87643, SAO 237672, RAFGL 4767, 2MASS J10043028−5839521, AAVSO 1001-58

Database references
SIMBAD	data

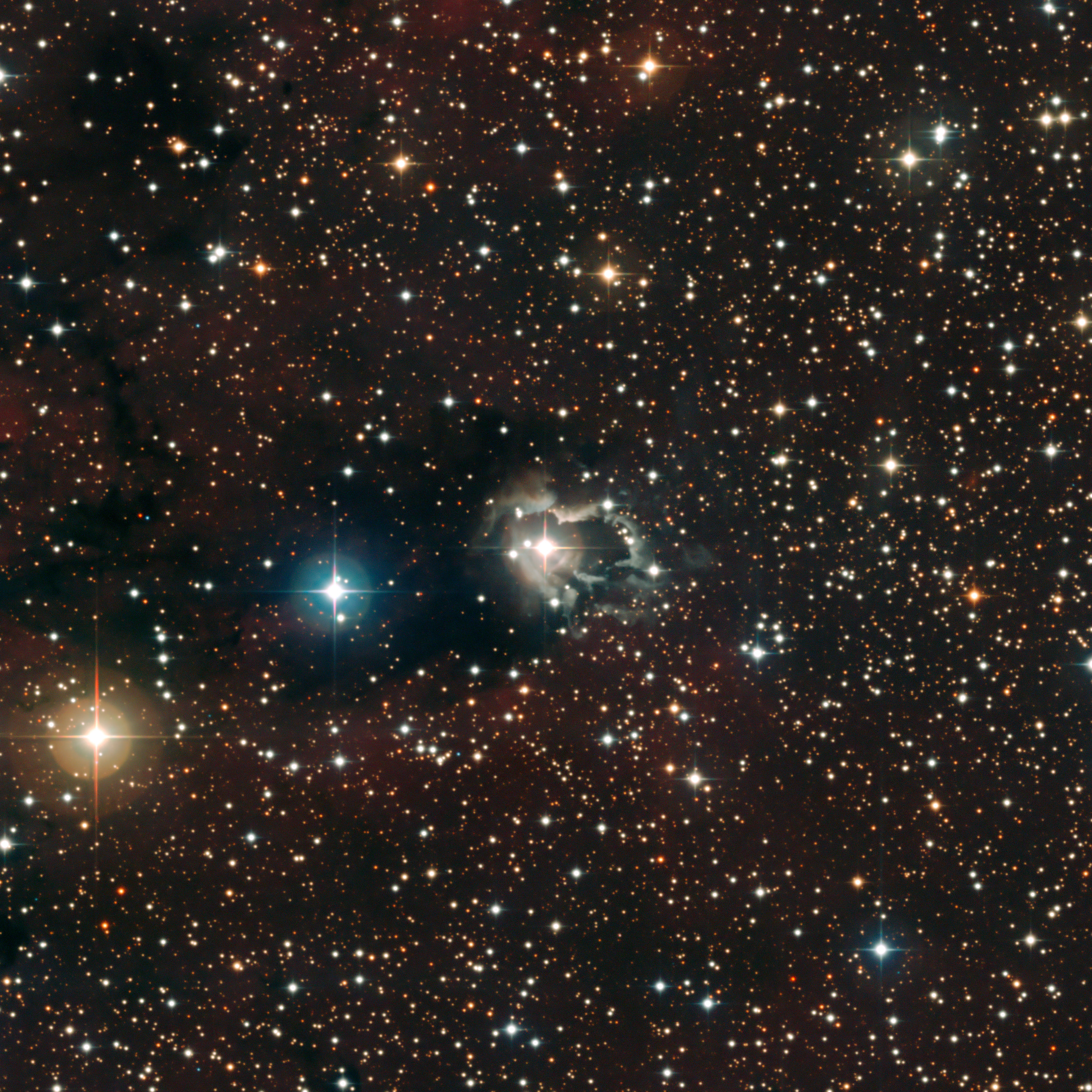
Reflection nebula around HD 87643

HD 87643 is a B[e] binary star embedded in a reflection nebula.

The system is described as having "one of the most extreme infrared excesses for this object class". It harbours a large amount of both hot and cold dust, and is surrounded by a debris disk with radius 2.5-3 AU and an extended reflection nebula. and is important for astronomers in their study of stellar formation.

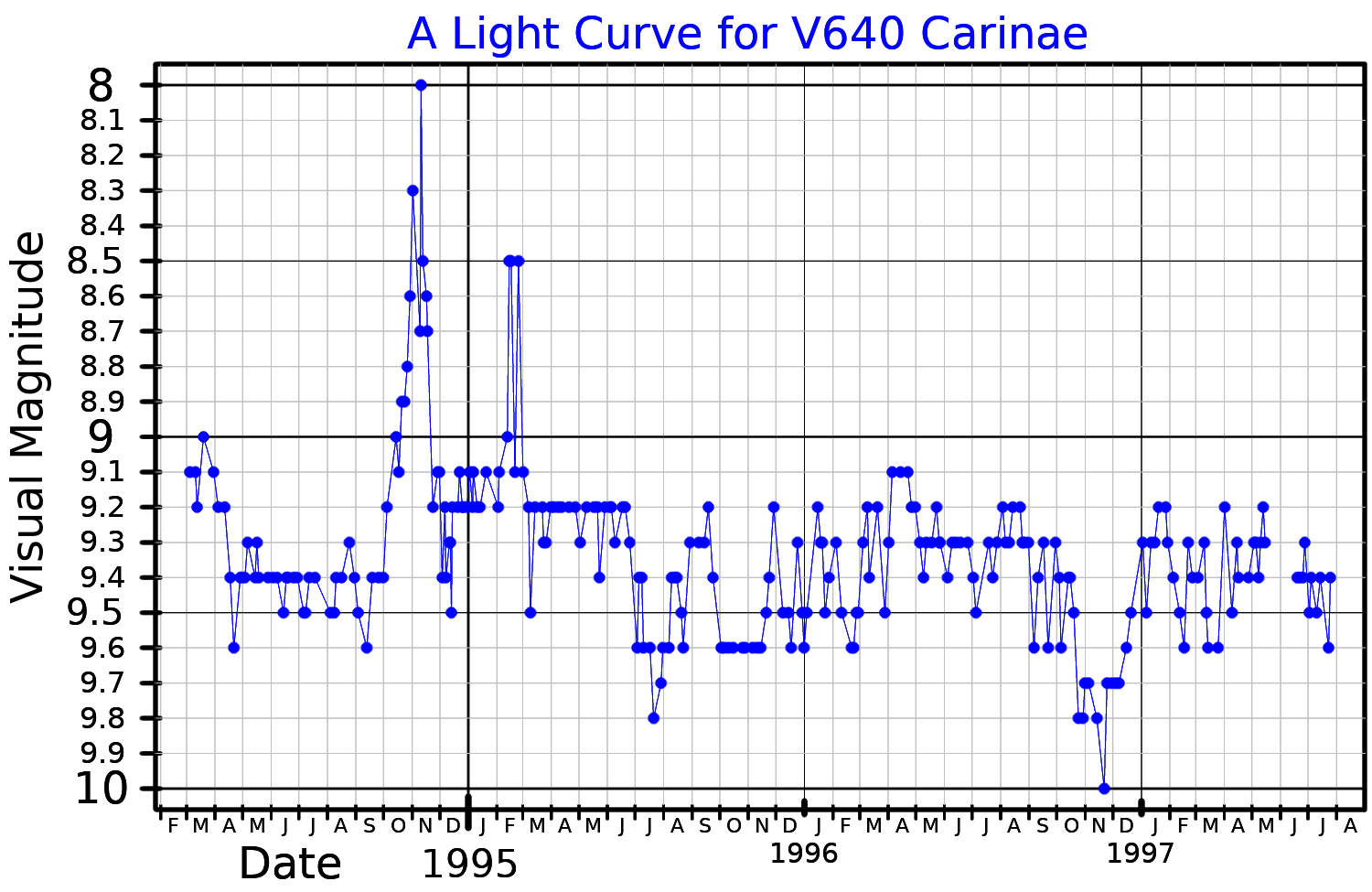
A visual band light curve for V640 Carinae, plotted from AAVSO data

All the properties of HD 87643 are highly uncertain. Its distance has been estimated anywhere from one to six kpc. In 1996, Carol Anne Grady et al. announced that the star is a variable star. It was given its variable star designation, V640 Carinae, in 2008. The General Catalogue of Variable Stars classifies it as an Orion variable, a pre-main sequence star, but other authors consider it to be a supergiant B[e] star. It has been confirmed to be a binary star system with the two stars separated by about 52 AU, but the nature of the companion is unknown.
