= J Puppis =

The Bayer designations j Puppis and J Puppis are distinct. Due to technical limitations, both designations link here. For the star

- j Puppis, see 11 Puppis
- J Puppis, see HD 64760

== See also ==
- QW Puppis (I Puppis)
