= AB Aurigae =

Star in the constellation Auriga

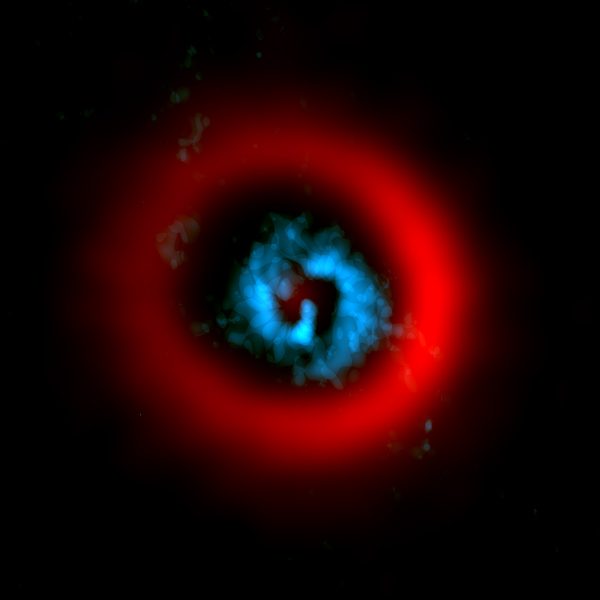
- ALMA image of the dust ring (red) and gaseous spirals (blue) of the circumstellar disk AB Aurigae reveal gaseous spiral arms inside a wide dust gap, providing a hint of planet formation. Credit: ALMA (ESO/NAOJ/NRAO)/Tang et al.

Observation data Epoch J2000 Equinox ICRS
- Constellation: Auriga
- Right ascension: 04^{h} 55^{m} 45.84589^{s}
- Declination: +30° 33′ 04.2921″
- Apparent magnitude (V): 7.05

Characteristics
- Evolutionary stage: Pre-main-sequence
- Spectral type: A0Ve
- U−B color index: +0.04
- B−V color index: +0.11
- Variable type: INA (Herbig Ae)

Astrometry
Radial velocity (R_{v})	+8.9±0.9 km/s
Proper motion (μ)	RA: +4.018 mas/yr Dec.: –24.027 mas/yr
Parallax (π)	6.4127±0.0372 mas
Distance	509 ± 3 ly (155.9 ± 0.9 pc)

Details
Mass	2.4±0.2 M_{☉}
Radius	2.5 R_{☉}
Luminosity	~38 L_{☉}
Temperature	9,772 K
Age	4±1 Myr

Other designations
- AB Aur, BD+30° 741, HD 31293, HIP 22910, SAO 57506

Database references
SIMBAD	data

AB Aurigae is a young Herbig Ae star in the constellation Auriga. It is located at a distance of approximately 509 light years from the Sun based on stellar parallax. This pre-main-sequence star has a stellar classification of A0Ve, matching an A-type main-sequence star with emission lines in the spectrum. It has 2.4 times the mass of the Sun and is radiating 38 times the Sun's luminosity from its photosphere at an effective temperature of 9,772 K. The radio emission from the system suggests the presence of a thermal jet originating from the star with a velocity of 300 km s^{−1}. This is causing an estimated mass loss of 1.7×10^{−8} M_{☉} yr^{−1}.

Mary Doris Applegate Beach discovered that AB Aurigae is a variable star by examining 150 photographic plates taken between 1914 and 1921. Her discovery was announced in 1921.

This star is known for hosting a dust disk that harbour a massive protoplanet or proto-brown dwarf. The star is part of the young Taurus-Auriga association, which is located in the Taurus Molecular Cloud. It may recently have encountered a dense cloudlet, which disrupted its debris disk and produced an additional reflection nebula.

== Substellar companion ==
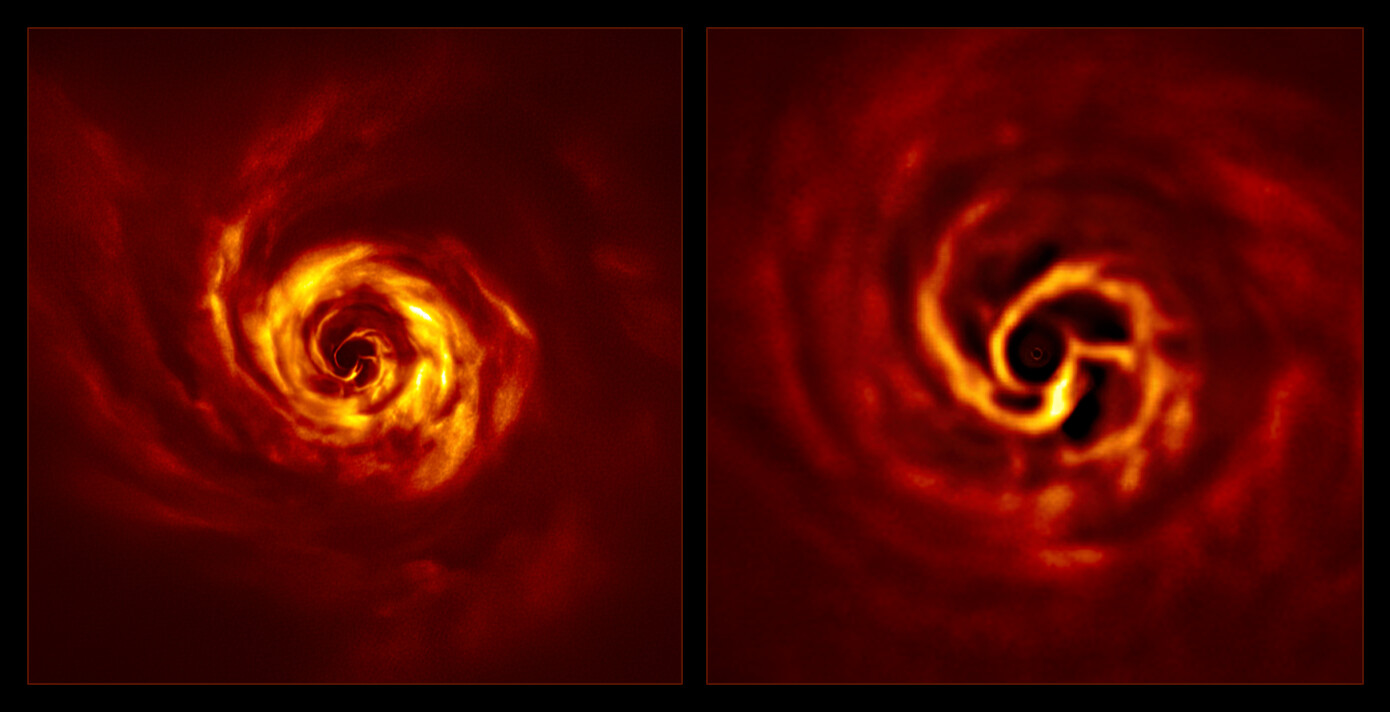
The protoplanetary disk of AB Aurigae as seen by the ERIS instrument of the VLT in polarised light. The right side is zoomed-in version of the area showing the inner region of the disc, including the very-bright-yellow ‘twist’ where a planet is believed to be forming.

In 2017 scientists used the Atacama Large Millimeter/submillimeter Array (ALMA) to take an image of the protoplanetary disk around AB Aurigae. The image showed a dusty disk which has a radius of about 120 astronomical units and a distinct "gap". Inside this gap gaseous spiral arms are detected in CO.

Observations with ALMA found two gaseous spiral arms inside the disk. These are best explained by an unseen planet with a semimajor axis of about 60–80 au. An additional planet with a semimajor axis of 30 au and with a large pitch angle compared to the disk (likely higher inclination) could explain the emptiness of the inner dusty disk. The outer planet was still not detected as in 2022, putting an upper limit on is mass at 3–4 M_{J}, inconsistent with the spiral structures observed in the disk. The planet-like clump observed in April 2022 at projected separation 93 AU from star, may be either an accretion disk around newly formed planet or the unstable disk region currently transforming into the planet. Evidence for unstable disk regions transforming into companions, possibly supporting such a formation of AB Aurigae b was reported in a Nature paper published in September 2024. The planet was independently detected in July 2022.

The AB Aurigae planetary system
Companion (in order from star)	Mass	Semimajor axis (AU)	Orbital period (years)	Eccentricity	Inclination (°)	Radius
protoplanetary disk	43–430 AU				—	—
b	9–20 M_{J}	93	?	0.19–0.60	27.1–58.2	2.75 R_{J}

== Gallery ==
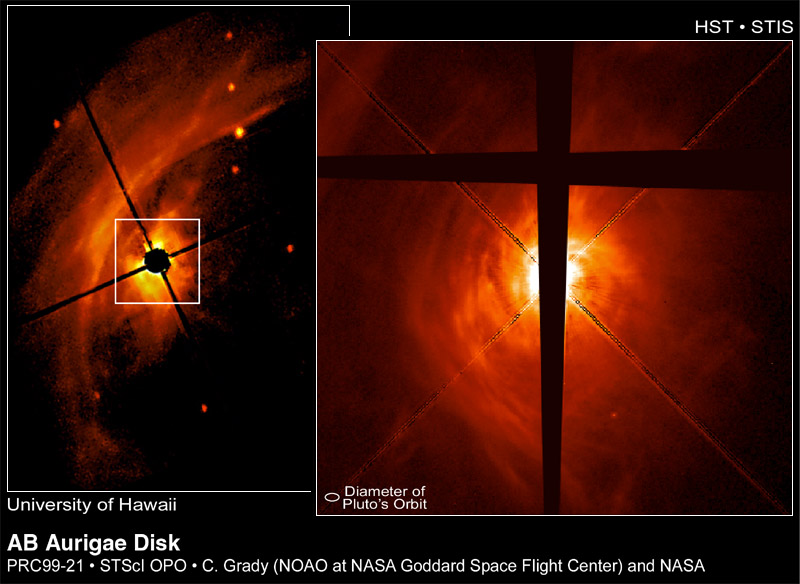
AB Aurigae and its dust disk seen by Hubble

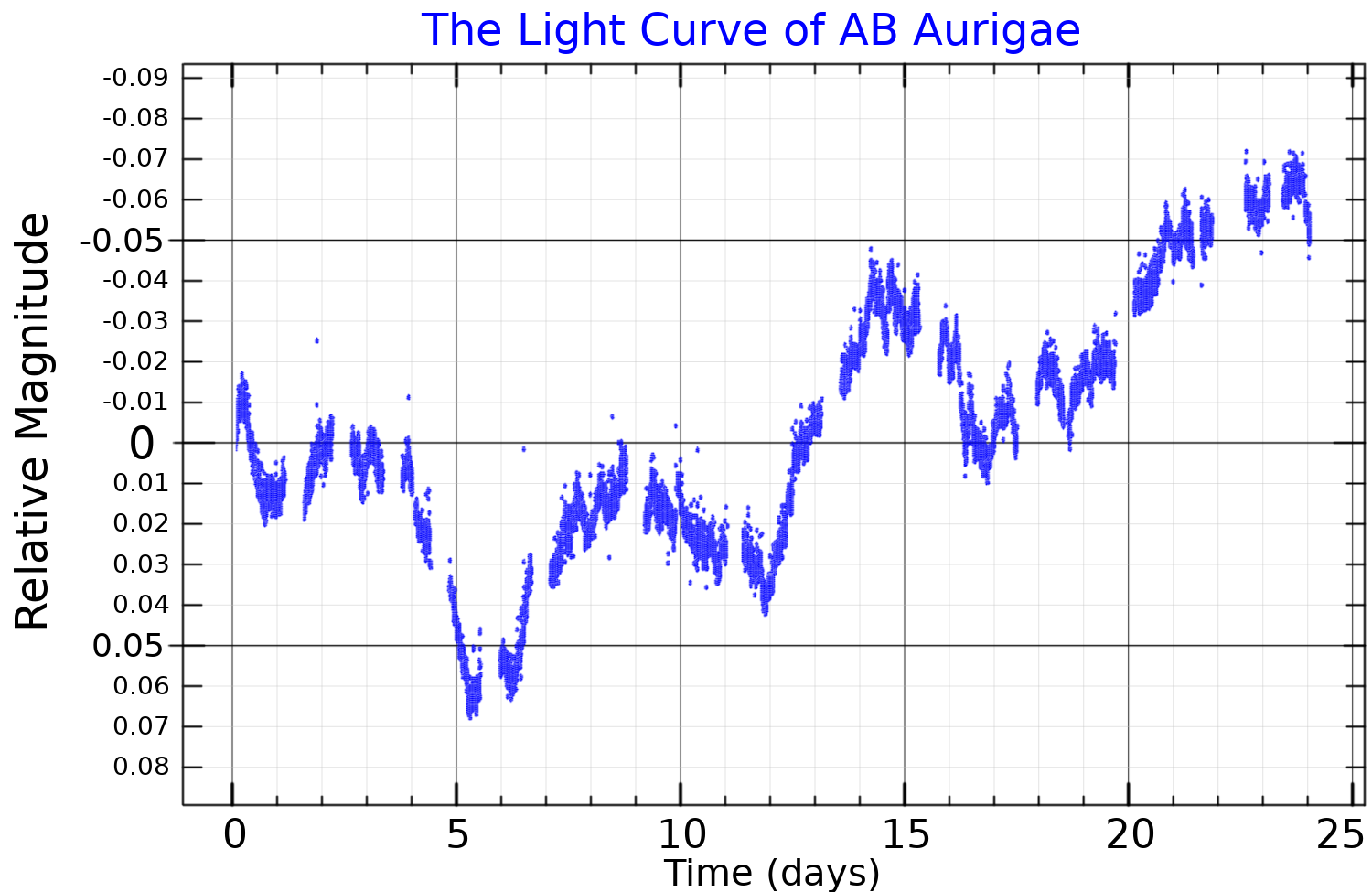
A light curve for AB Aurigae from MOST satellite data, adapted from Cody et al. (2013)

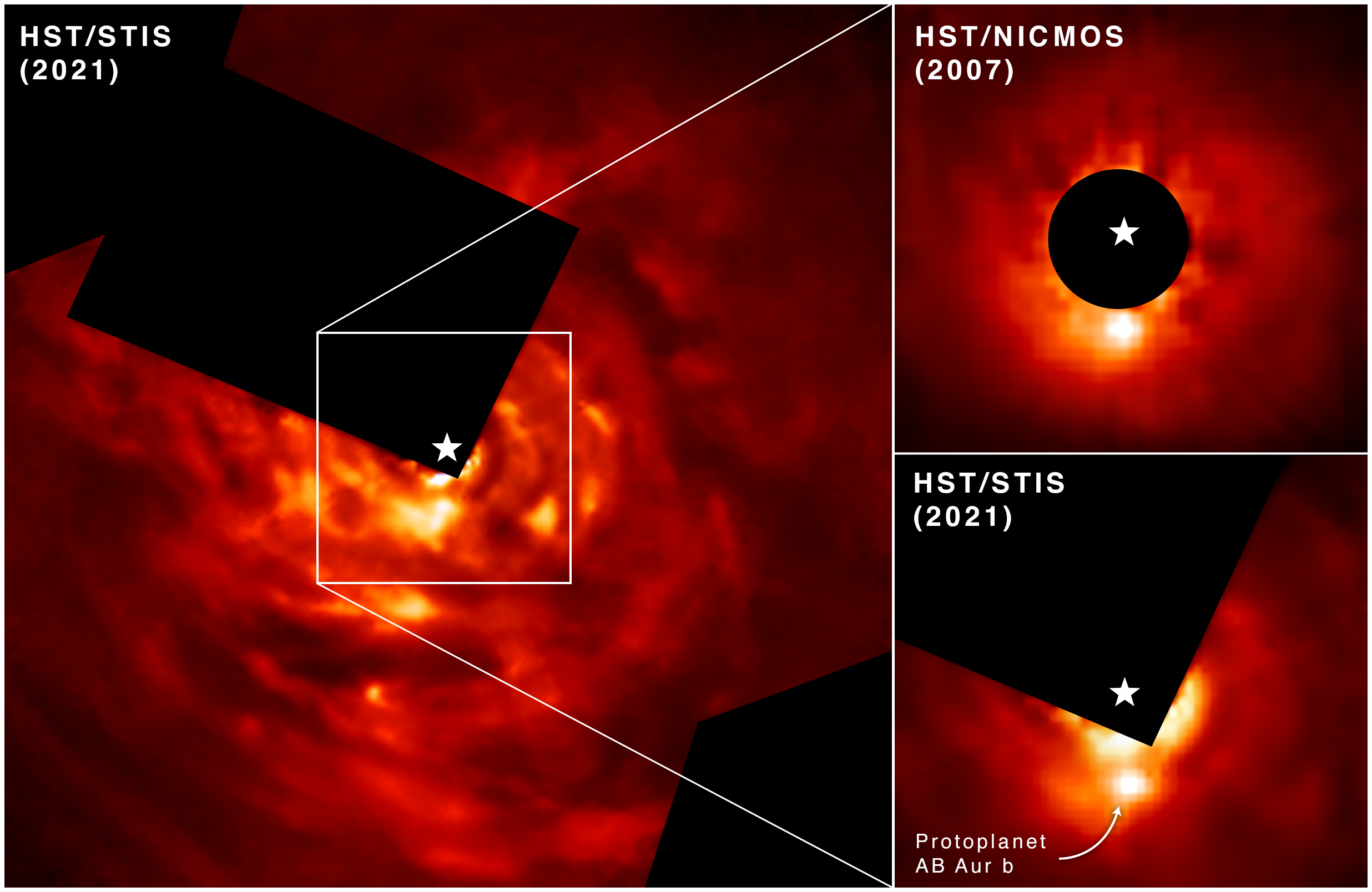
Hubble Space Telescope images of protoplanet AB Aurigae b.
