= IC 2177 =

Region of nebulosity in Monoceros constellation

Emission nebula
- H II region
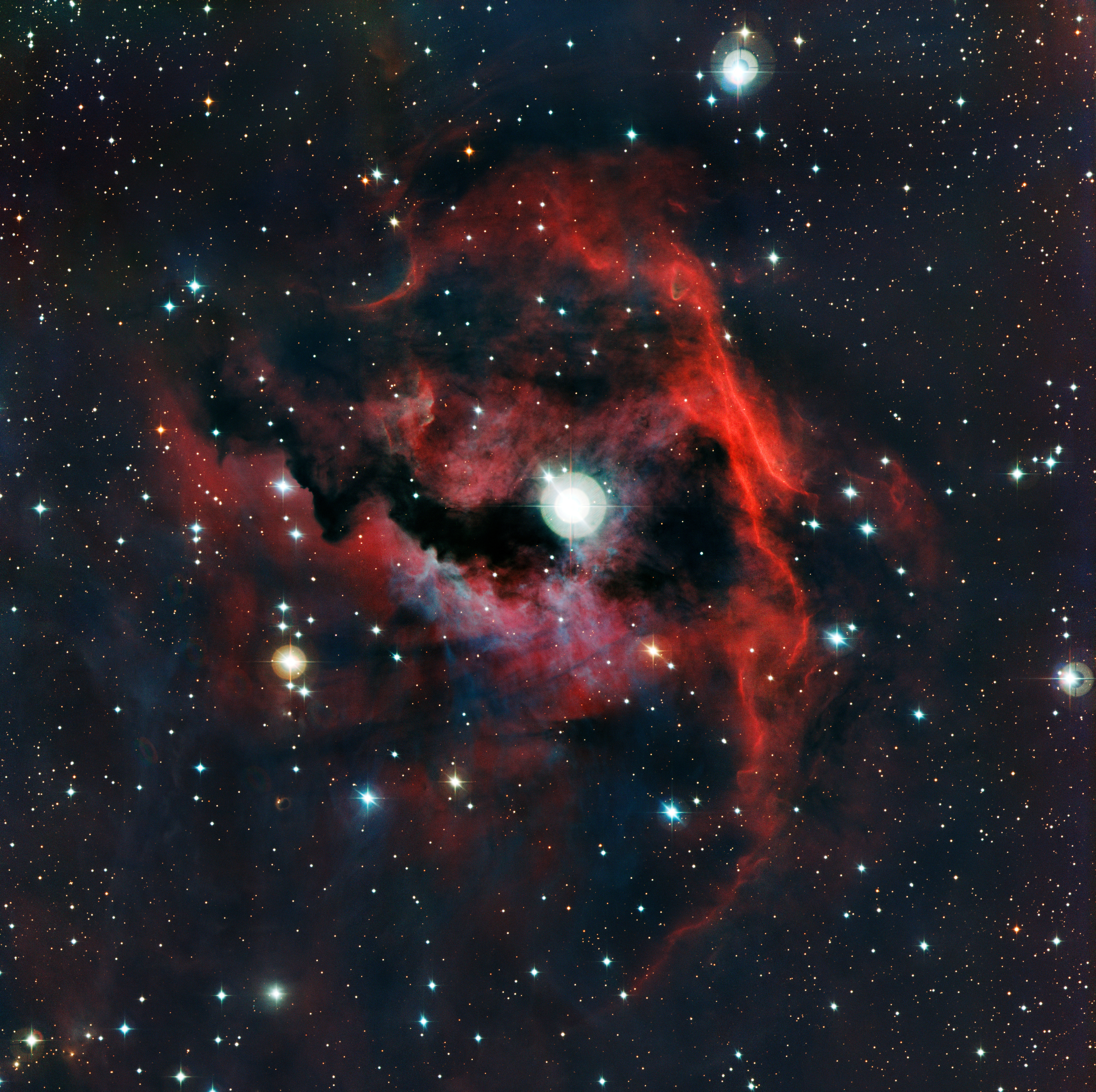
- Detailed view of IC 2177 produced by the Wide Field Imager on the MPG/ESO 2.2-metre telescope.

Observation data: J2000 epoch
- Right ascension: 07^{h} 04^{m} 25^{s}
- Declination: −10° 27′ 18″
- Distance: 3650 ly (1,120 pc)
- Apparent magnitude (V): 15.23
- Constellation: Monoceros
- Designations: GUM 1, IC 2177, Sh2-292

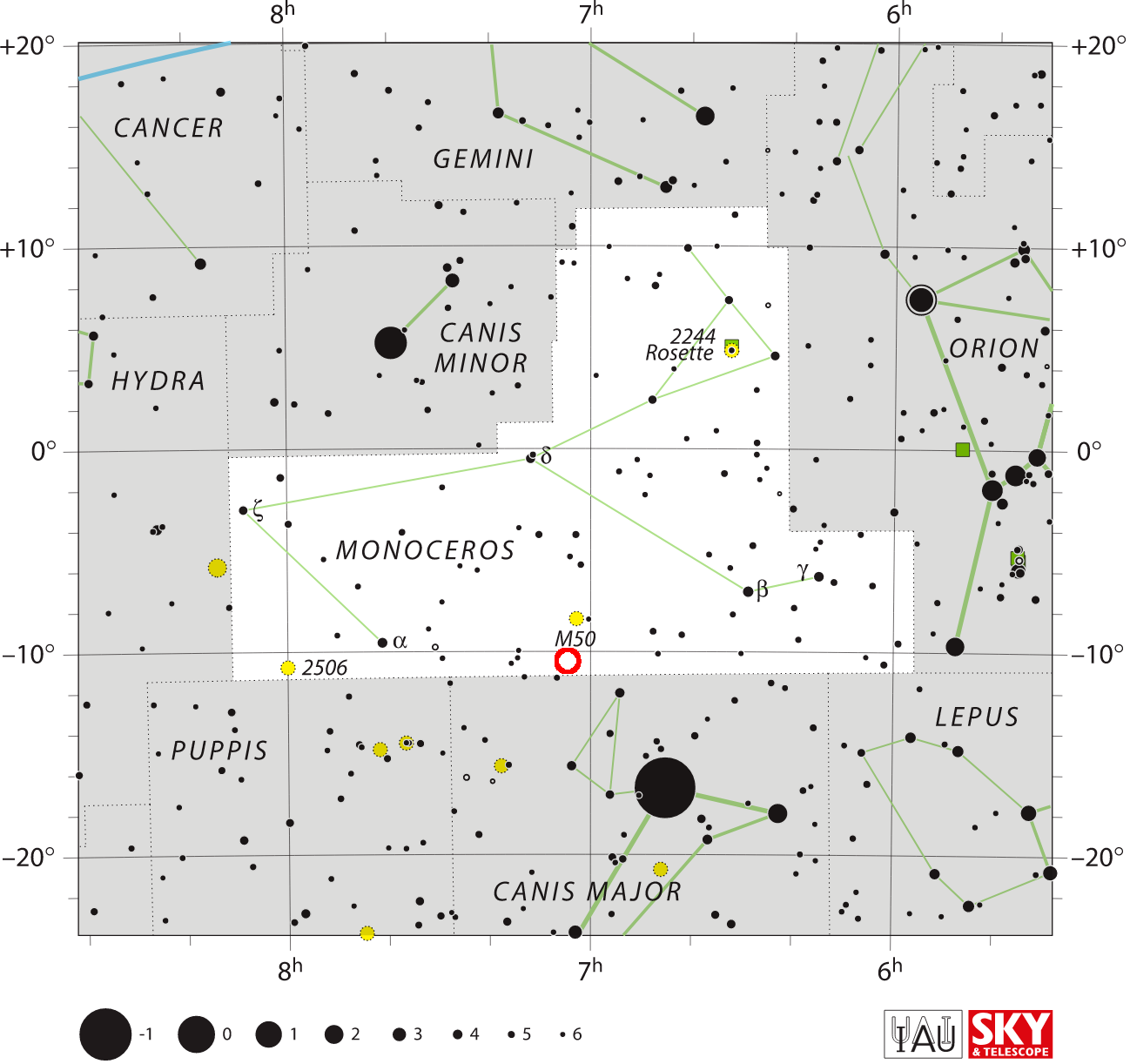
The location of IC 2177 (circled in red)

IC 2177 is a region of nebulosity that lies along the border between the constellations Monoceros and Canis Major. It is a roughly circular H II region centered on the Be star HD 53367. This nebula was discovered by Welsh amateur astronomer Isaac Roberts and was described by him as "pretty bright, extremely large, irregularly round, very diffuse."

The name Seagull Nebula is sometimes applied by amateur astronomers to this emission region, although it more properly includes the neighboring regions of star clusters, dust clouds and reflection nebulae. This latter region includes the open clusters NGC 2335 and NGC 2343.

IC 2177 is also known as the Seagull's Head, due to its larger presence in the Seagull nebula. The nebula Gum 2, also known as Sh 2-296, forms the Seagull's wings.

== Gallery ==
Seagull Nebula taken by VST OmegaCAM.

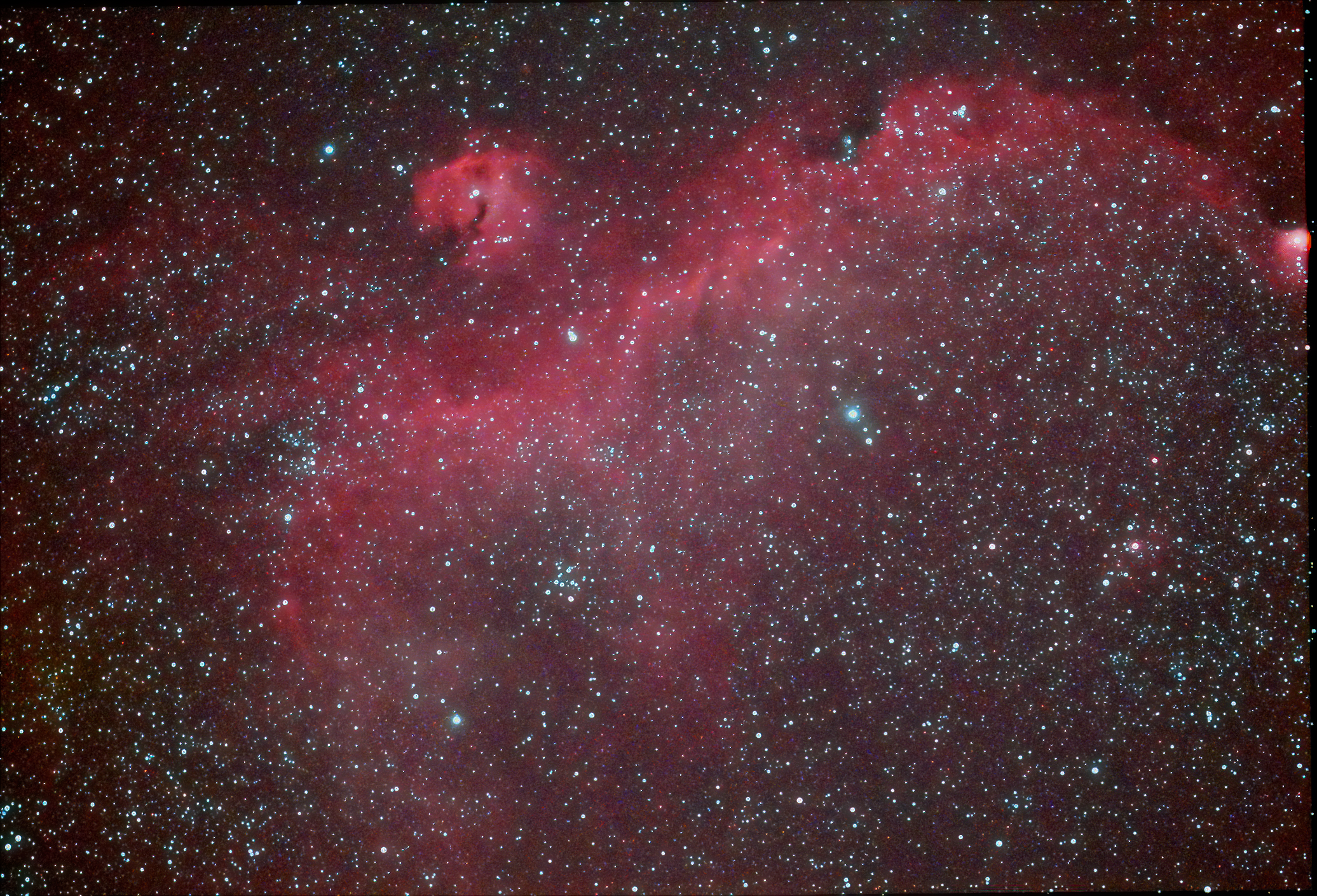
Amateur image of the Seagull Nebula, taken with 100mm refractor

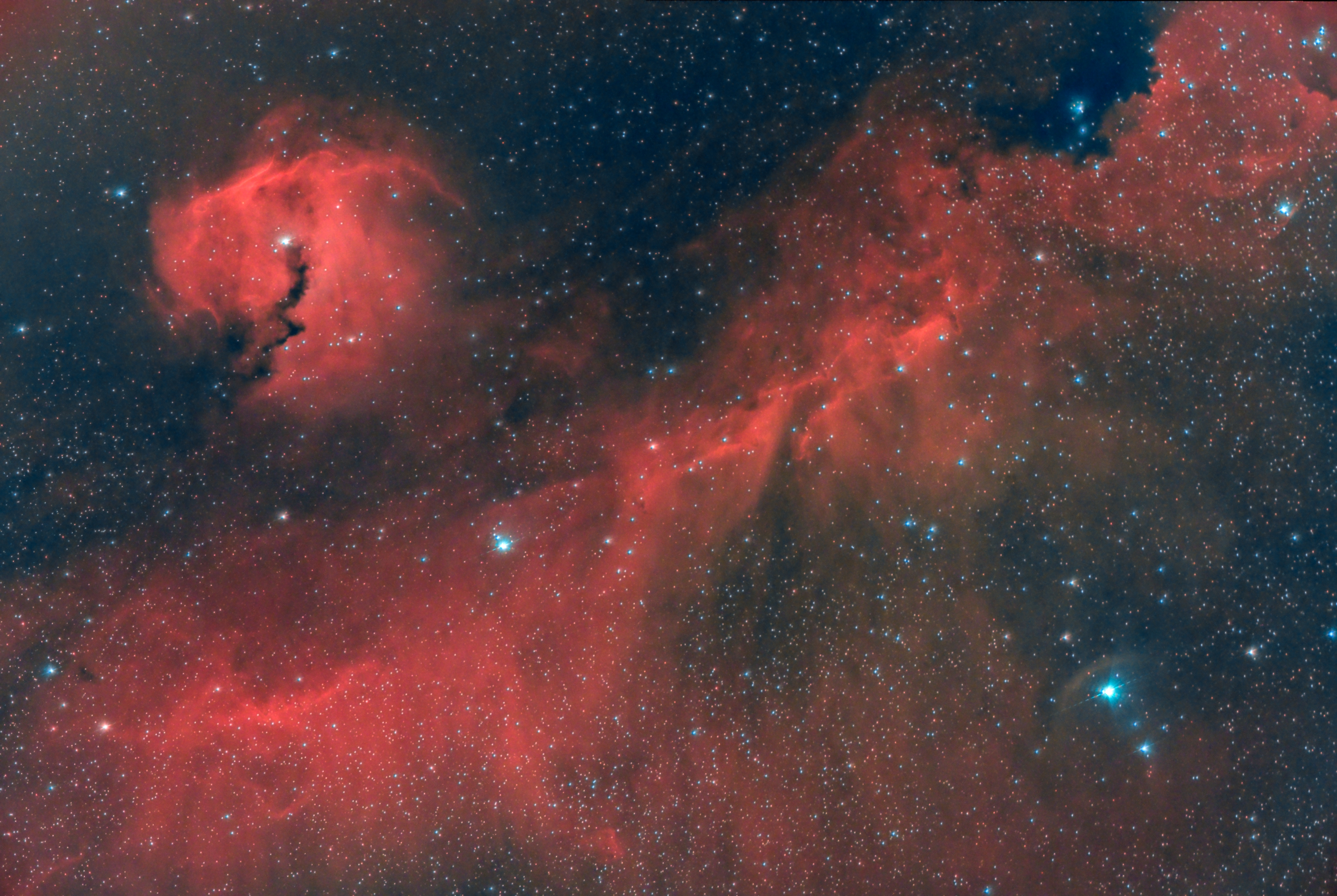
Amateur image of the Seagull Nebula, from an 11" telescope

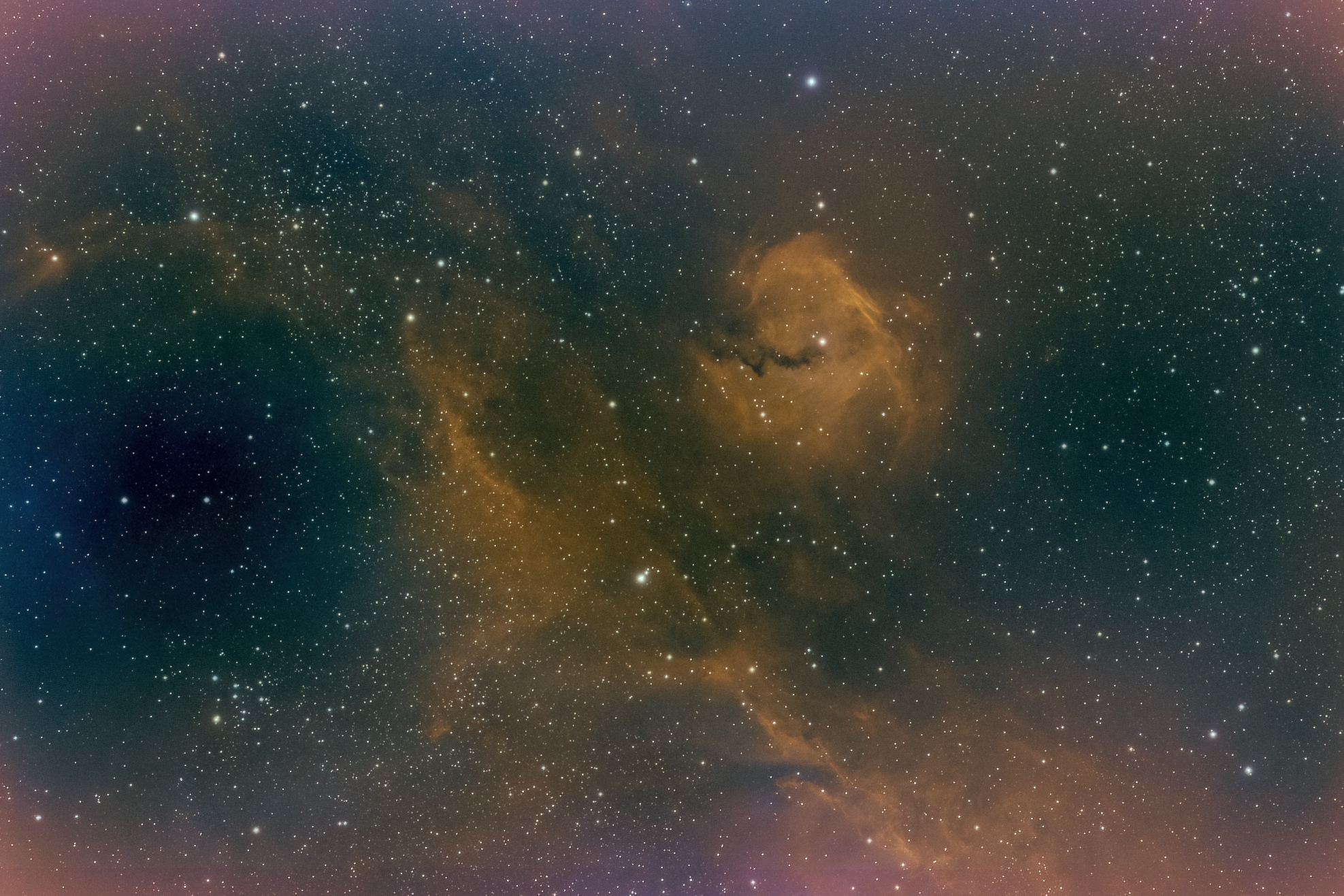
Amateur image of the Seagull Nebula, taken with the Stellarvue SV102 Access refractor

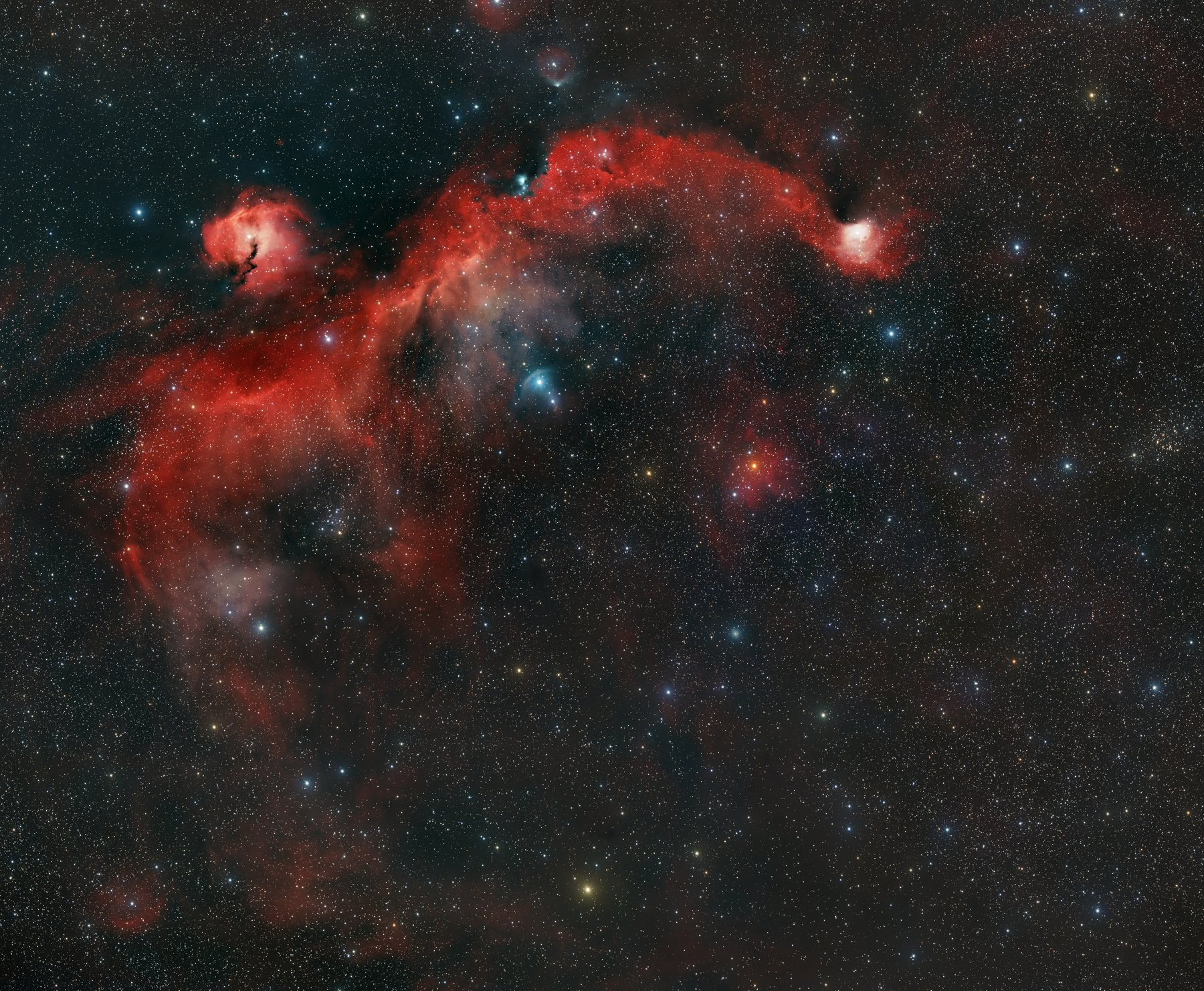
The Seagull Nebula (IC 2177), an emission nebula on the Monoceros–Canis Major border. Amateur astrophotograph by Arnaud Geoffroy.

The Seagull Nebula imaged by the Vera C. Rubin Observatory's Commissioning Camera
