= FS Canis Majoris variable =

Type of variable star

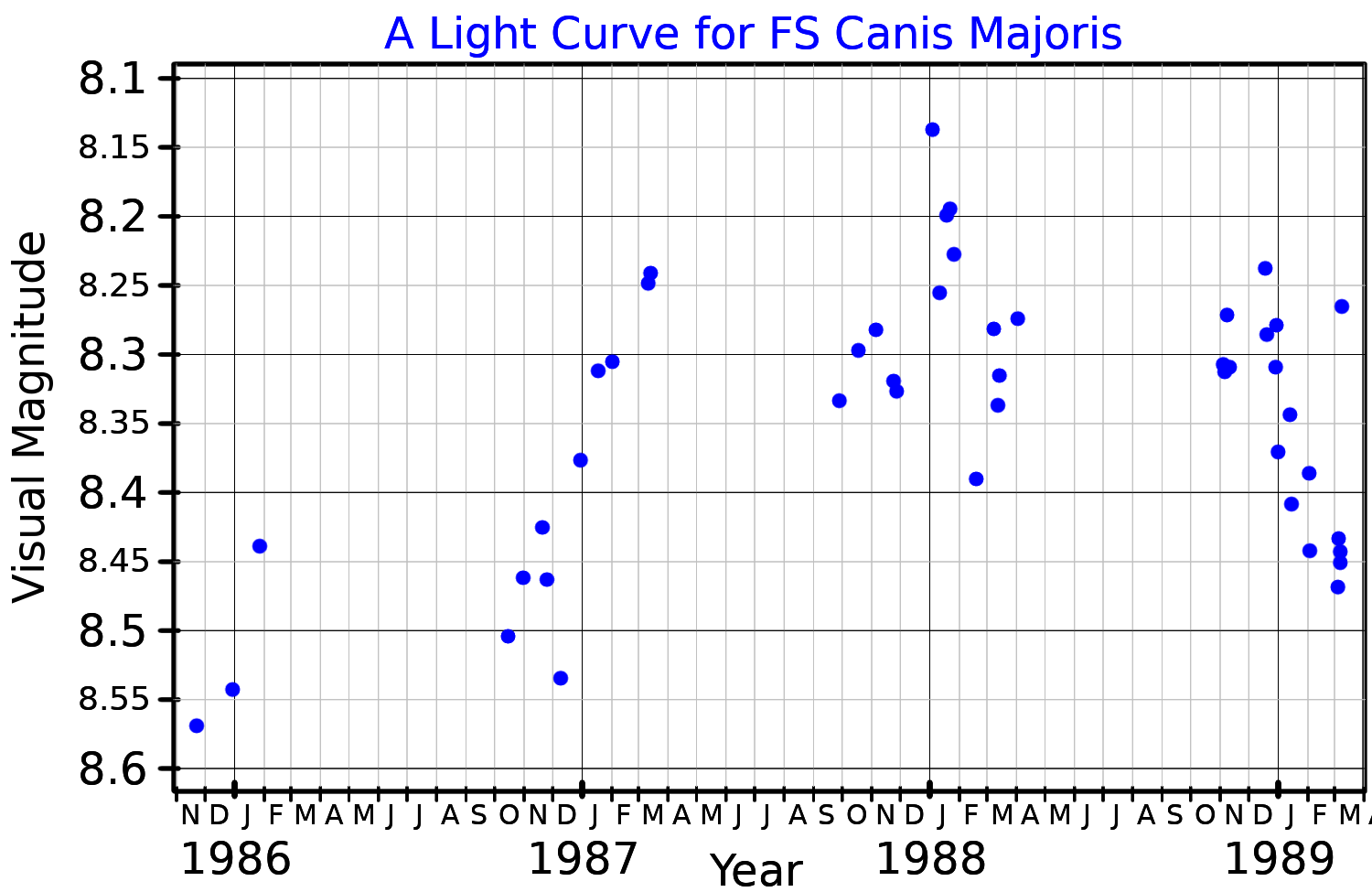
Light curve for FS Canis Majoris, the prototype star of this class.

An FS Canis Majoris variable (FS CMa star) is a type of eruptive variable star. The class of variable stars are named after its prototype, FS Canis Majoris. They are somewhat poorly understood, but are probably binary star systems in which mass exchange is ongoing or has recently happened. These most likely consist of at least one B-type main-sequence star in a dust envelope. They undergo irregular light variations over long periods of time, with magnitude variation of approximately 2 magnitudes.

The hydrogen emission lines from FS CMa stars are much stronger than in normal Be stars, and certain forbidden lines are present in the spectrum as well so they are classified as a sub-type of B[e] star.

FS CMa stars are rare and it has been difficult to determine their properties well enough to determine what causes their unusual character. Several have been detected in massive star clusters and this has ruled out some theories about their origin. The preferred explanation is still for a binary origin, possibly as the result of stellar mergers.
