= HD 64760 =

Star in the constellation Puppis

- Location of HD 64760 (circled)

Observation data Epoch J2000 Equinox J2000
- Constellation: Puppis
- Right ascension: 07^{h} 53^{m} 18.15792^{s}
- Declination: −48° 06′ 10.5637″
- Apparent magnitude (V): 4.24

Characteristics
- Spectral type: B0.5Ib
- U−B color index: −0.99
- B−V color index: −0.14

Astrometry
Radial velocity (R_{v})	+41.00 km/s
Proper motion (μ)	RA: −5.60 mas/yr Dec.: +5.76 mas/yr
Parallax (π)	1.97±0.10 mas
Distance	1,660 ± 80 ly (510 ± 30 pc)
Absolute magnitude (M_{V})	−4.30

Details
Mass	15.5 M_{☉}
Radius	21.6 R_{☉}
Luminosity	155,000 L_{☉}
Temperature	24,600 K
Rotation	98.9 hours
Rotational velocity (v sin i)	238 km/s

Other designations
- J Puppis, CD−47°3396, GC 10689, GSC 08139-04578, HIP 38518, HR 3090, HD 64760, SAO 219111

Database references
SIMBAD	data

HD 64760 (J Puppis) is a class B0.5 supergiant star in the constellation Puppis. Its apparent magnitude is 4.24 and it is approximately 1,660 light years away based on parallax.

The stellar wind structure of HD 64760 has been extensively studied. Its spectrum shows classic P Cygni profiles indicative of strong mass loss and high-velocity winds, but the spectral line profiles are also variable. The variation shows a 2.4 day modulation which is caused by non-radial pulsation of the star itself. Other pulsation periods around 4.81 hours have also been identified.

HD 64760 rotates rapidly. Despite its large size it completes a rotation every 4.1 days compared to every 27 days for the sun. This causes the star to be an oblate spheroid, with the equatorial radius 20% larger than the polar radius. It is estimated that the temperature of the photosphere is 23,300 K at the equator and 29,000 K at the poles, due to gravity darkening. In addition, the surface has temperature variations due to its pulsations. The effective temperature for the star as a whole is 24,600 K, to match the bolometric luminosity of 155,000 L_{☉}.
