= L2 Puppis =

Star in the constellation Puppis

L_{2} Puppis
- Location of L_{2} Puppis (circled)

Observation data Epoch J2000 Equinox ICRS
- Constellation: Puppis
- Right ascension: 07^{h} 13^{m} 32.31810^{s}
- Declination: −44° 38′ 23.0630″
- Apparent magnitude (V): 5.10; 2.6–6 (GCVS); 6–8 (1995 – )

Characteristics
- Evolutionary stage: Red-giant branch
- Spectral type: M5IIIe
- U−B color index: +1.24
- B−V color index: +1.56
- Variable type: SRb

Astrometry
Radial velocity (R_{v})	33.0 km/s
Proper motion (μ)	RA: 106.31 mas/yr Dec.: 324.99 mas/yr
Parallax (π)	15.61±0.99 mas
Distance	210 ± 10 ly (64 ± 4 pc)

Details
Mass	0.659±0.043 M_{☉}
Radius	123±14 R_{☉}
Luminosity	1,490±150 L_{☉}
Surface gravity (log g)	0.078±0.027 cgs
Temperature	3,500±250 K
Age	10 Gyr

Other designations
- L2 Puppis, L02 Pup, HR 2748, CD−44°3227, HD 56096, LTT 2769, SAO 218549, HIP 34922

Database references
SIMBAD	data

L_{2} Puppis (also known as HD 56096) is a giant star in the constellation of Puppis and is located between the bright stars Canopus and Sirius. It is a semi-regular pulsating star, and is intermittently visible to the naked eye.

== History ==
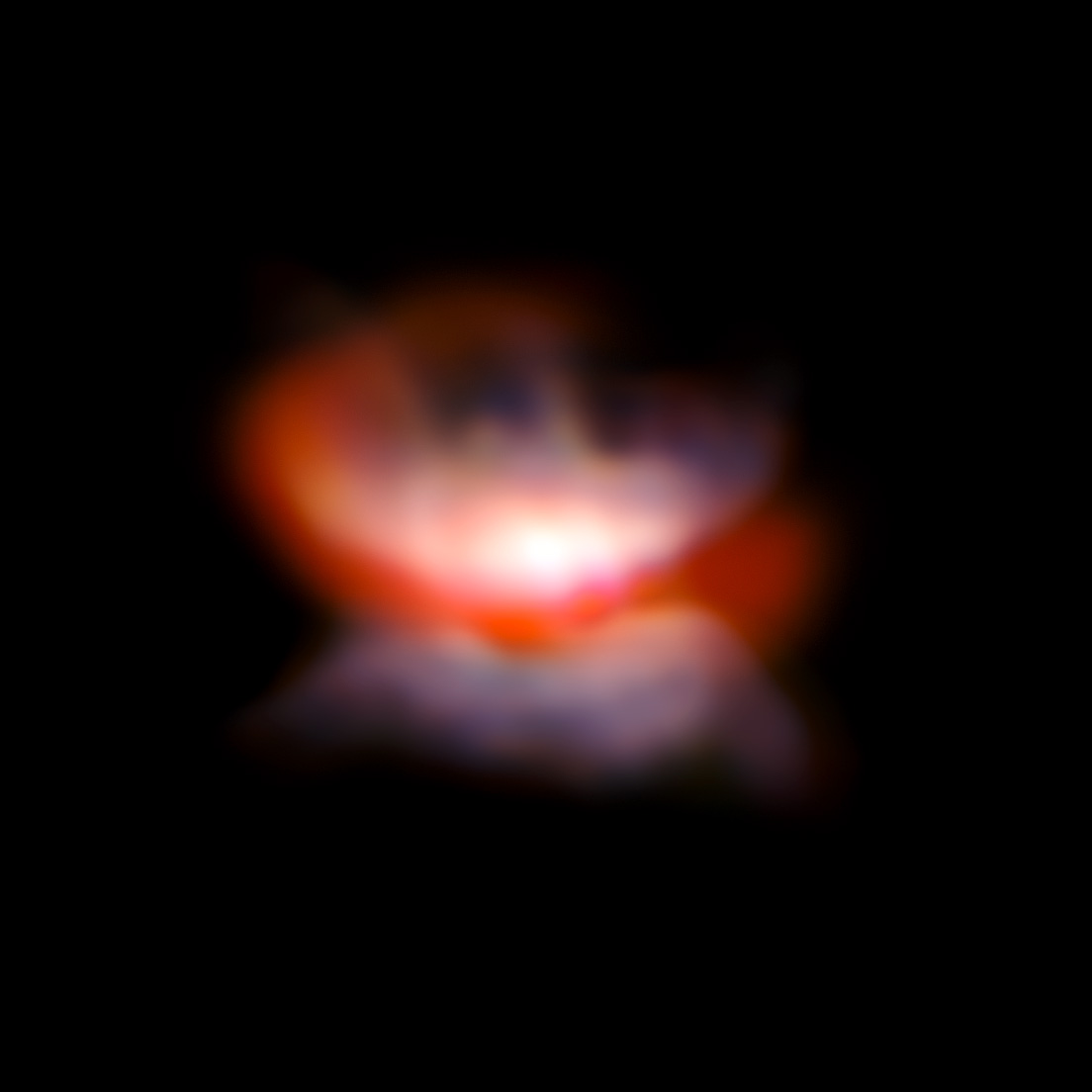
SPHERE and VLT NACO image of the nebulosity forming around L_{2} Puppis (Credit: ESO/P. Kervella)

The designation L_{2} has a tangled history. This star and another (OU Puppis) were both labelled with "L" by Nicolas-Louis de Lacaille when he created the constellation Puppis within Argo Navis. The two stars were labelled as "1.L" and "2.L" by Johann Elert Bode in his star catalogue published in 1801. Later authors used L1 and L2, usually with numeric subscripts (i.e. L_{1} and L_{2}), but occasionally as superscripts. The subscripted designation is now universally used where typography allows for subscripts.

L_{2} Puppis was discovered to be variable by Benjamin Apthorp Gould in 1872, and was listed in Uranometria Argentina as 73 G. Puppis with magnitude 5.10v. It has never been given a formal variable star designation, unlike L_{1} Puppis which is OU Puppis.

== Variability ==
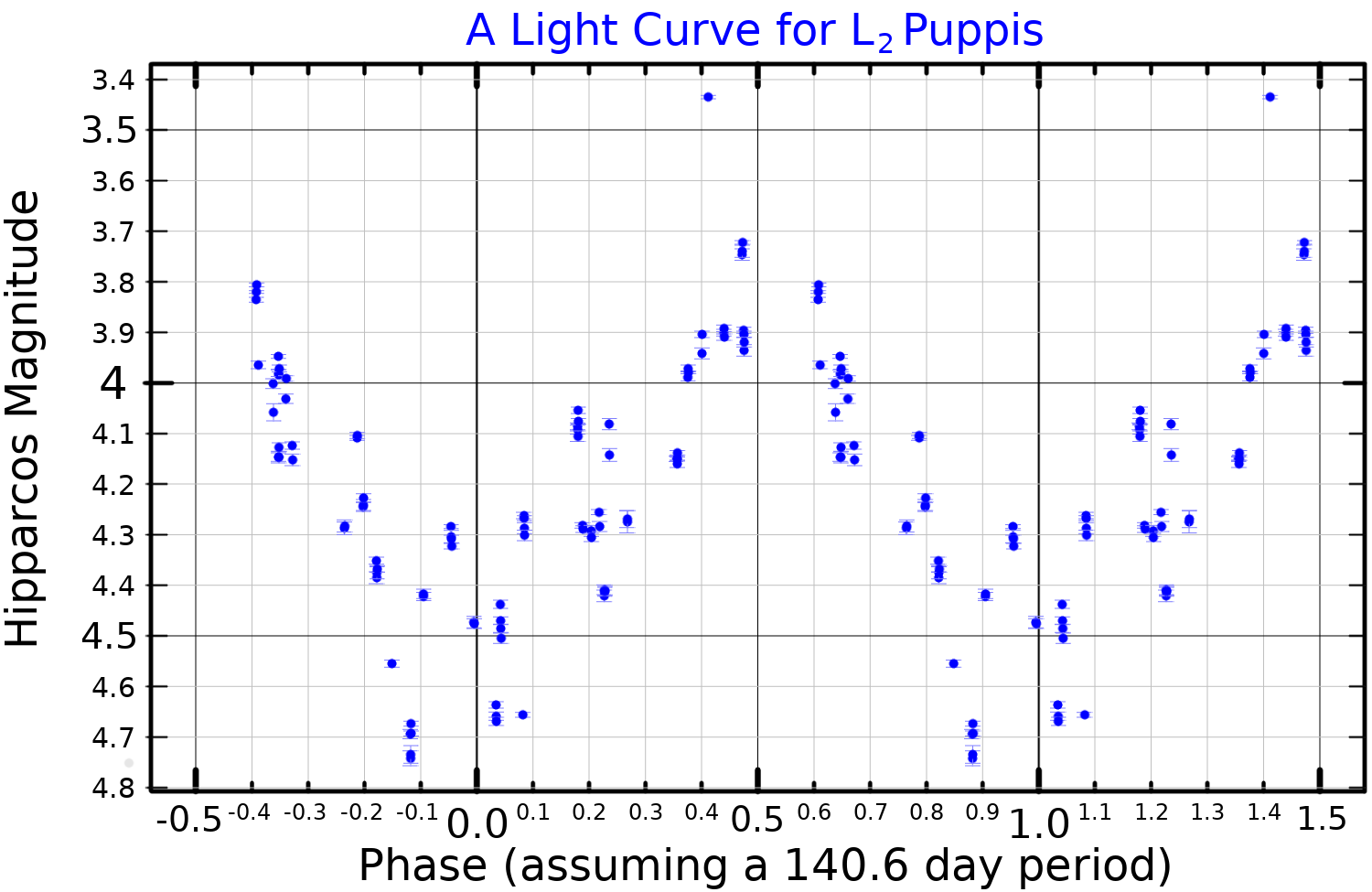
A light curve for L_{2} Puppis, plotted from Hipparcos data

L_{2} Puppis varies in apparent magnitude by about two magnitudes with a period of 140 days. The average brightness also varies slowly over several years so that the total range is given as magnitude 2.6–6.0. Since 1995 the average brightness has dropped so that the 140-day variations are now between about magnitude 6 and 8. The variation in light may be caused by a combination of radial pulsations in the star's atmosphere and by dimming from circumstellar dust.

== Characteristics ==
L_{2} Puppis is most likely a red-giant branch star that has passed through the main sequence and is undergoing hydrogen-shell burning. It is shedding mass at the rate of about 5×10^{−7} M_{☉} per year, forming a circumstellar dust disk and bipolar plumes of gas that are thought to be the start of a "butterfly"-type planetary nebula.

The mass of L_{2} Puppis was directly measured at 0.66 M_{☉} and its original mass is inferred to be as close as one M_{☉} about 10 billion years ago. An indirect estimate using stellar evolutionary tracks yields a higher mass of 2+1
−0.5 M_{☉} and a younger age of 1.5 billion years. The Galactic space velocity is consistent with a thick disk star, which further supports the older age.

L_{2} Puppis has a wide companion, a low-mass red dwarf separated by a minimum of 2,100 astronomical units. It also has a visual 12th-magnitude companion, but it is actually a much more distant star not related to this system. A hundred years ago, they were separated by about a minute of arc, but different proper motions mean that this is now about 1.5′.

== Candidate planet ==
A candidate exoplanet has been found orbiting L_{2} Puppis every 4.69 years at a distance of 2.43 AU. The mass is highly uncertain, at 12 ± 16 M_{J}, and it might just be a dense clump of gas and dust.
