= OU Puppis =

Star in the constellation Puppis

- Location of OU Puppis (circled)

Observation data Epoch J2000 Equinox ICRS
- Constellation: Puppis
- Right ascension: 07^{h} 13^{m} 13.35060^{s}
- Declination: −45° 10′ 57.8554″
- Apparent magnitude (V): 4.87

Characteristics
- Spectral type: A0pSi
- U−B color index: −0.07
- B−V color index: −0.03
- Variable type: α^{2} CVn

Astrometry
Radial velocity (R_{v})	+4.30 km/s
Proper motion (μ)	RA: −25.166 mas/yr Dec.: −87.380 mas/yr
Parallax (π)	17.3622±0.0768 mas
Distance	187.9 ± 0.8 ly (57.6 ± 0.3 pc)
Absolute magnitude (M_{V})	1.11

Details
Mass	2.215 M_{☉}
Radius	2.232 R_{☉}
Luminosity	37.05 L_{☉}
Surface gravity (log g)	4.26 cgs
Temperature	9,568 K
Metallicity [Fe/H]	−0.67 dex
Rotational velocity (v sin i)	34 km/s
Age	382 Myr

Other designations
- L_{1} Puppis, OU Pup, CD−44°3223, GC 9591, GSC 08119–01757, HIP 34899, HR 2746, HD 56022, SAO 218546

Database references
SIMBAD	data

OU Puppis (OU Pup) is a chemically peculiar class A0 (white main-sequence) star in the constellation Puppis. Its apparent magnitude is about 4.9 and it is approximately 188 light-years away based on parallax.

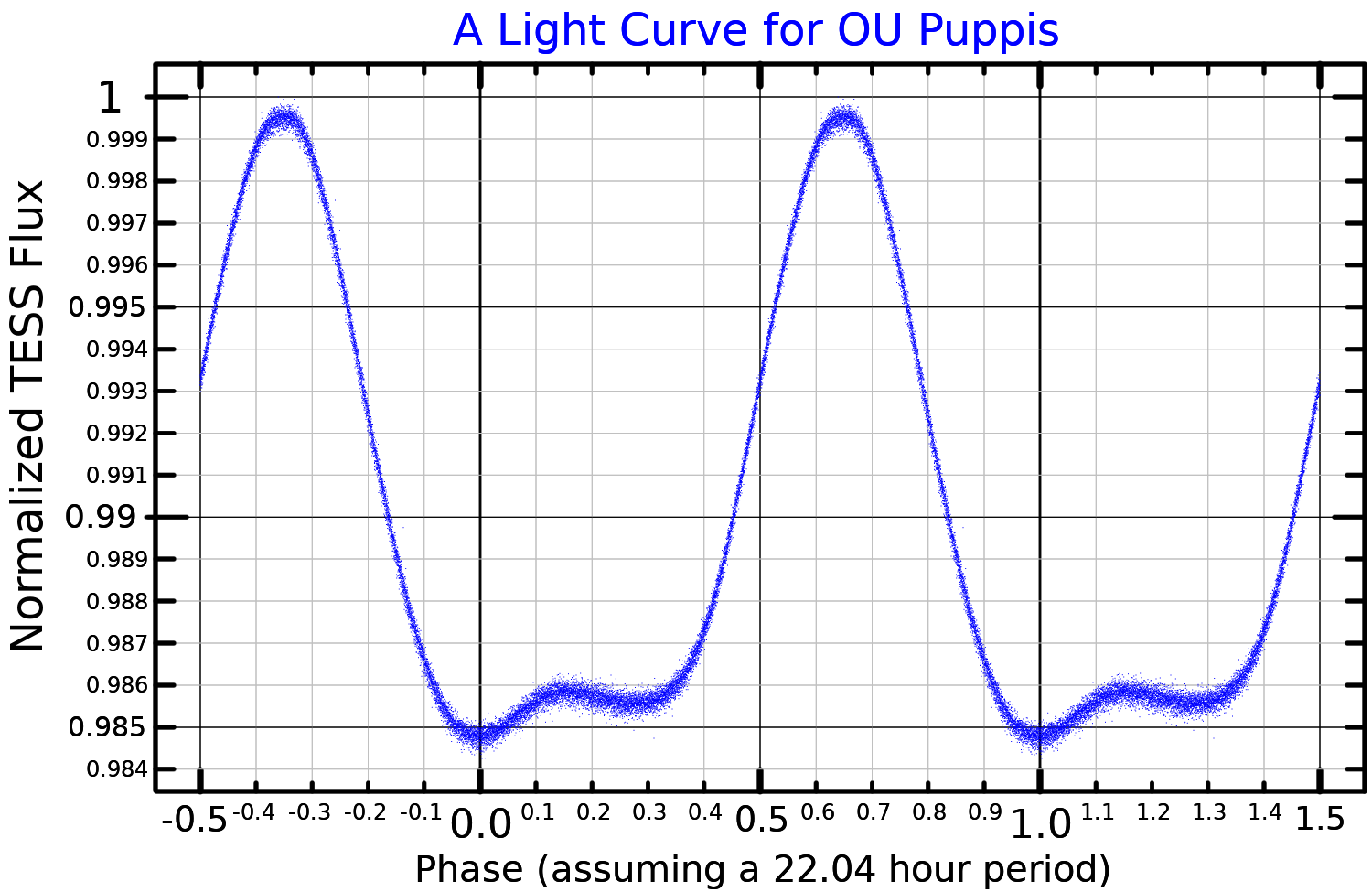
A light curve for OU Puppis, plotted from TESS data

It is an α^{2} CVn variable, ranging from 4.93 to 4.86 magnitudes with a period of 0.92 of a day. Its spectrum has unusually strong lines of silicon, chromium, and strontium, making it an Ap star.

Unlike the majority of star pairs, the number attached to the Bayer designation 'L' is generally a subscript: L_{1}. Its better-known companion L_{2} Puppis is similarly represented.
