= FS Canis Majoris =

Star in the constellation Canis Major

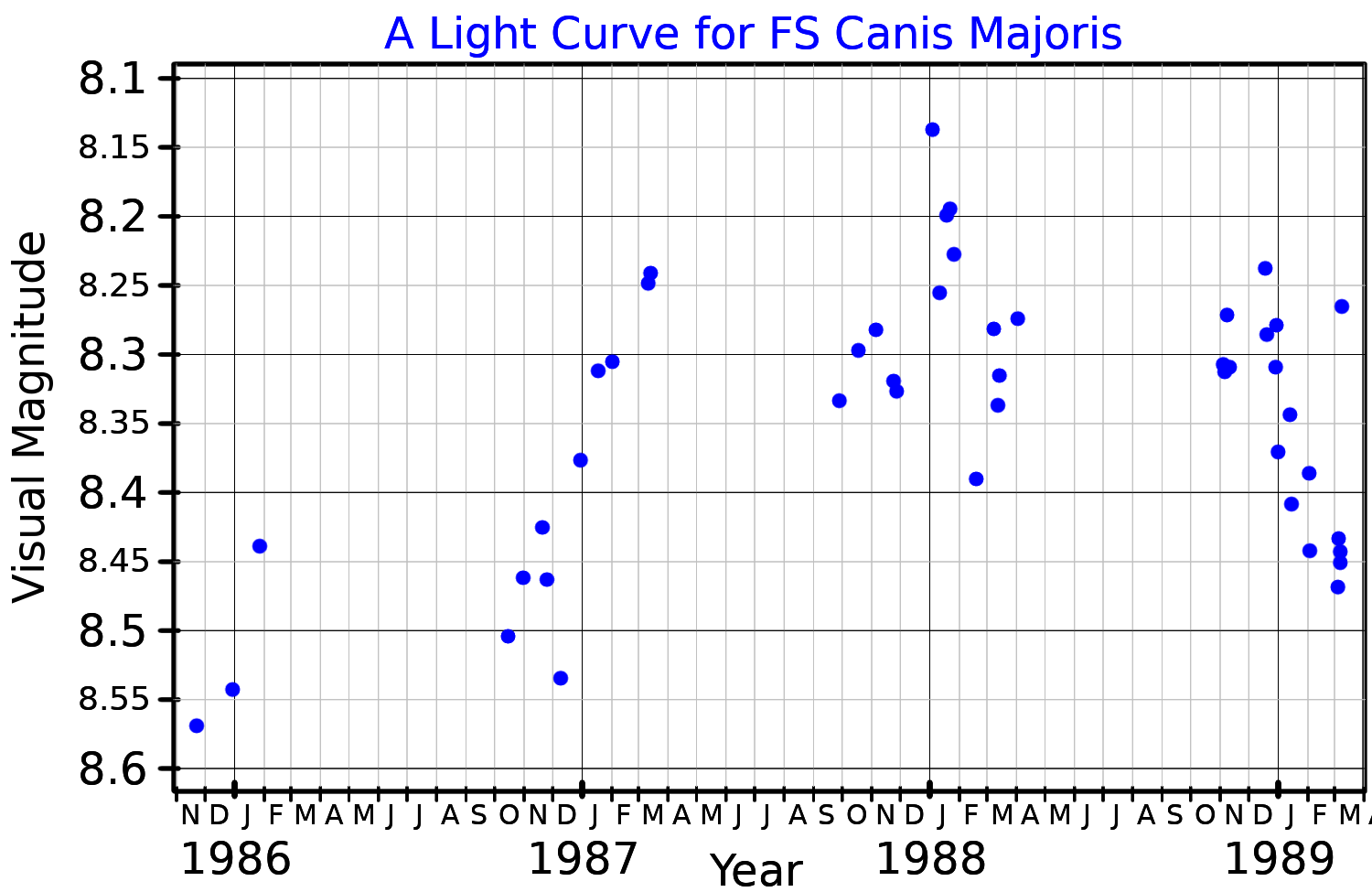
- A visual band light curve for FS Canis Majoris, adapted from Halbedel (1989)

Observation data Epoch J2000.0 Equinox J2000.0 (ICRS)
- Constellation: Canis Major
- Right ascension: 06^{h} 28^{m} 17.42197^{s}
- Declination: −13° 03′ 11.1289″
- Apparent magnitude (V): 8.50

Characteristics
- Spectral type: Bpshe
- U−B color index: −0.686
- B−V color index: +0.076
- Variable type: FS CMa

Astrometry
Radial velocity (R_{v})	21.6 ± 2 km/s
Proper motion (μ)	RA: +1.331 mas/yr Dec.: +1.594 mas/yr
Parallax (π)	1.7481±0.0448 mas
Distance	1,870 ± 50 ly (570 ± 10 pc)

Details
Mass	7.2 M_{☉}
Luminosity	2,723 L_{☉}
Surface gravity (log g)	3.65 cgs
Temperature	19,409 K

Other designations
- FS CMa, BD−12 1500, HD 45677, HIP 30800, PPM 217230, SAO 151534

Database references
SIMBAD	data

FS Canis Majoris (FS CMa), also known as HD 45677 or MWC 142, is a B-type star in the constellation of Canis Major. It has an apparent visual magnitude of approximately 8.50, having varied between magnitudes 7.35 and 8.58. Feinstein and colleagues reported in 1976 that it had decreased by 0.9 magnitude between 1969 and 1976, whereas it had only varied by 0.3 magnitude in the 70 years beforehand. Sometimes it could vary by up to 0.5 magnitude in a year or 0.1 magnitude in a night, and there did not appear to be any regular period to its variability.

In 1971, Jean-Pierre Swings and David Allen announced their discovery that the star, then called HD 45677, is a variable star. It was given its variable star designation, FS Canis Majoris, in 1973. Astronomer Anatoly Miroshnichenko has made it the prototype of a new type of variable star, the FS Canis Majoris variables. These are hot blue-white stars that exhibit forbidden line emission and strong infra-red excess suggestive of very young (pre-main-sequence) stars yet they do not lie in star-forming regions. Nor did they appear to be stars that had evolved off the main sequence into giant or supergiant stars. It is now thought that they are main-sequence stars that have absorbed or are absorbing matter, most likely from a companion star, and are surrounded by a compact dusty shell. These stars are thought to be significant contributors to interstellar dust. FS Canis Majoris has been well studied due to its dusty disk, which is inclined 51° relative to the plane of sky. The disk has a gap within 5 au of the star.

Its spectral type has been previously classified as B2III to B2V and its bolometric magnitude as -4.89. However, investigation of its spectrum in 2006 showed that FS Canis Majoris is a binary system. The system is between 1,250 and 8,000 times as luminous as the Sun. One calculation has the masses of the primary and secondary at 9.3±0.5 and 4.8±0.9 solar masses and radii 6.6±0.5 and 2.9±0.6 times that of the Sun, and surface temperatures of 21,600±350 and 16,380±1,670 K, respectively.
