= Herbig Ae/Be star =

Young stars of spectral types A and B

A Herbig Ae/Be star (HAeBe) is a pre-main-sequence star – a young (<10 Myr) star of spectral types A or B. These stars are still embedded in gas-dust envelopes and are sometimes accompanied by circumstellar disks. Hydrogen and calcium emission lines are observed in their spectra. They are 2–8 Solar mass (M_{☉}) objects, still existing in the star formation (gravitational contraction) stage and approaching the main sequence (i.e. they are not burning hydrogen in their center).

== Description ==
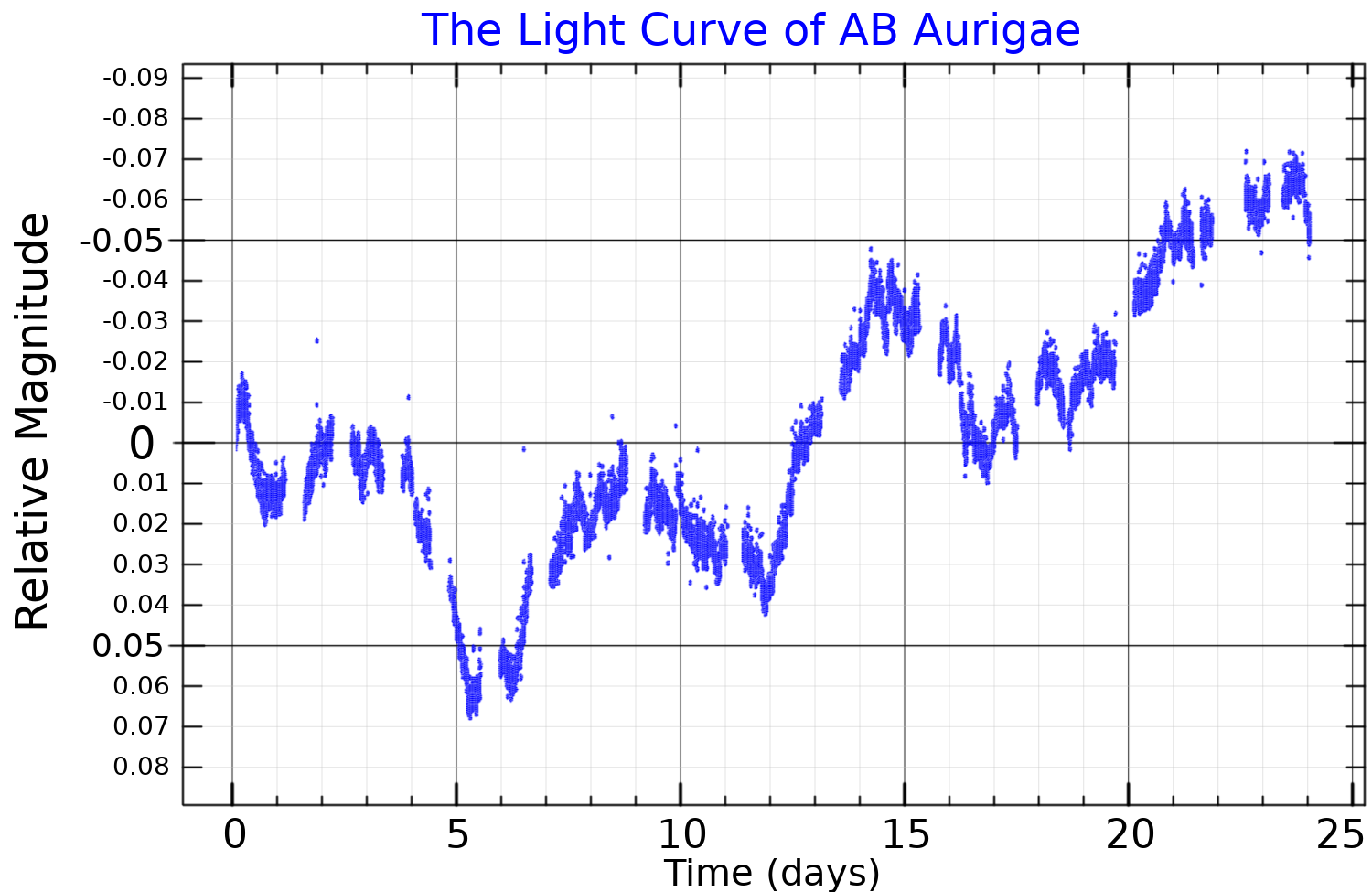
A light curve of AB Aurigae, a Herbig Ae/Be star, based on data collected from MOST satellite data

In the Hertzsprung–Russell diagram, Herbig Ae/Be stars are located to the right of the main sequence. They are named after the American astronomer George Herbig, who first distinguished them from other stars in 1960. The original Herbig criteria were:

- Spectral type earlier than F0 (in order to exclude T Tauri stars),
- Balmer emission lines in the stellar spectrum (in order to be similar to T Tauri stars),
- Projected location within the boundaries of a dark interstellar cloud (in order to select really young stars near their birthplaces),
- Illumination of a nearby bright reflection nebula (in order to guarantee physical link with star formation region).

There are now several known isolated Herbig Ae/Be stars (i.e. not connected with dark clouds or nebulae). Thus the most reliable criteria now can be:

- Spectral type earlier than F0,
- Balmer emission lines in the stellar spectrum,
- Infrared radiation excess (in comparison with normal stars) due to circumstellar dust (in order to distinguish from classical Be stars, which have infrared excess due to free-free emission).

Sometimes Herbig Ae/Be stars show significant brightness variability. They are believed to be due to clumps (protoplanets and planetesimals) in the circumstellar disk. In the lowest brightness stage the radiation from the star becomes bluer and linearly polarized (when the clump obscures direct star light, scattered from disk light relatively increases – it is the same effect as the blue color of our sky).

Analogs of Herbig Ae/Be stars in the smaller mass range (<2 M_{☉}) – F, G, K, M spectral type pre-main-sequence stars – are called T Tauri stars. More massive (>8 M_{☉}) stars in pre-main-sequence stage are not observed, because they evolve very quickly: when they become visible (i.e. disperses surrounding circumstellar gas and dust cloud), the hydrogen in the center is already burning and they are main-sequence objects.

== Planets ==
Planets around Herbig Ae/Be stars include:

- HD 95086 b around an A-type star
- HD 100546 b around a B-type star
- AB Aurigae b around an A-type star

== Gallery ==
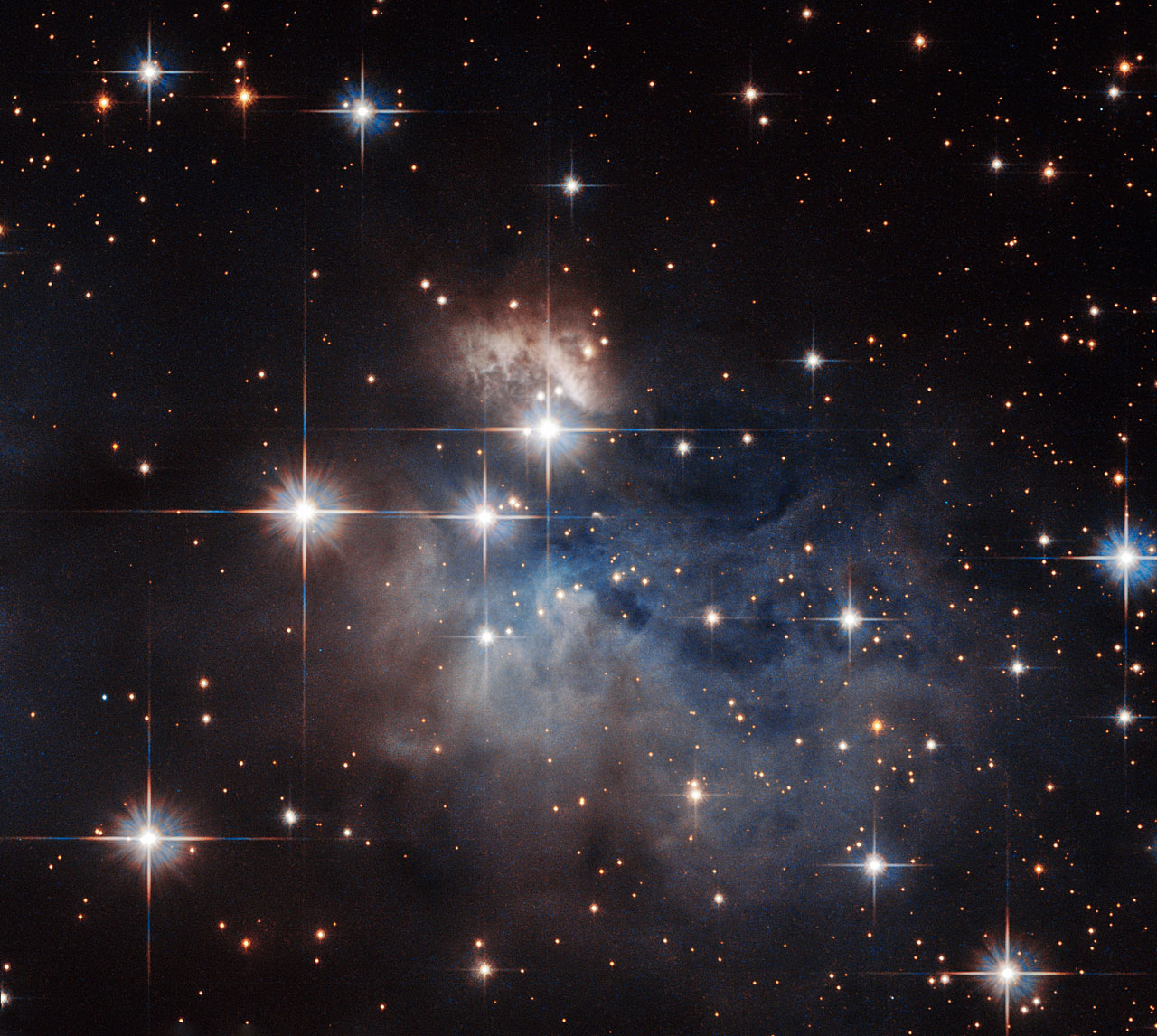
IRAS 12196-6300 is located just under 2300 light-years from Earth.

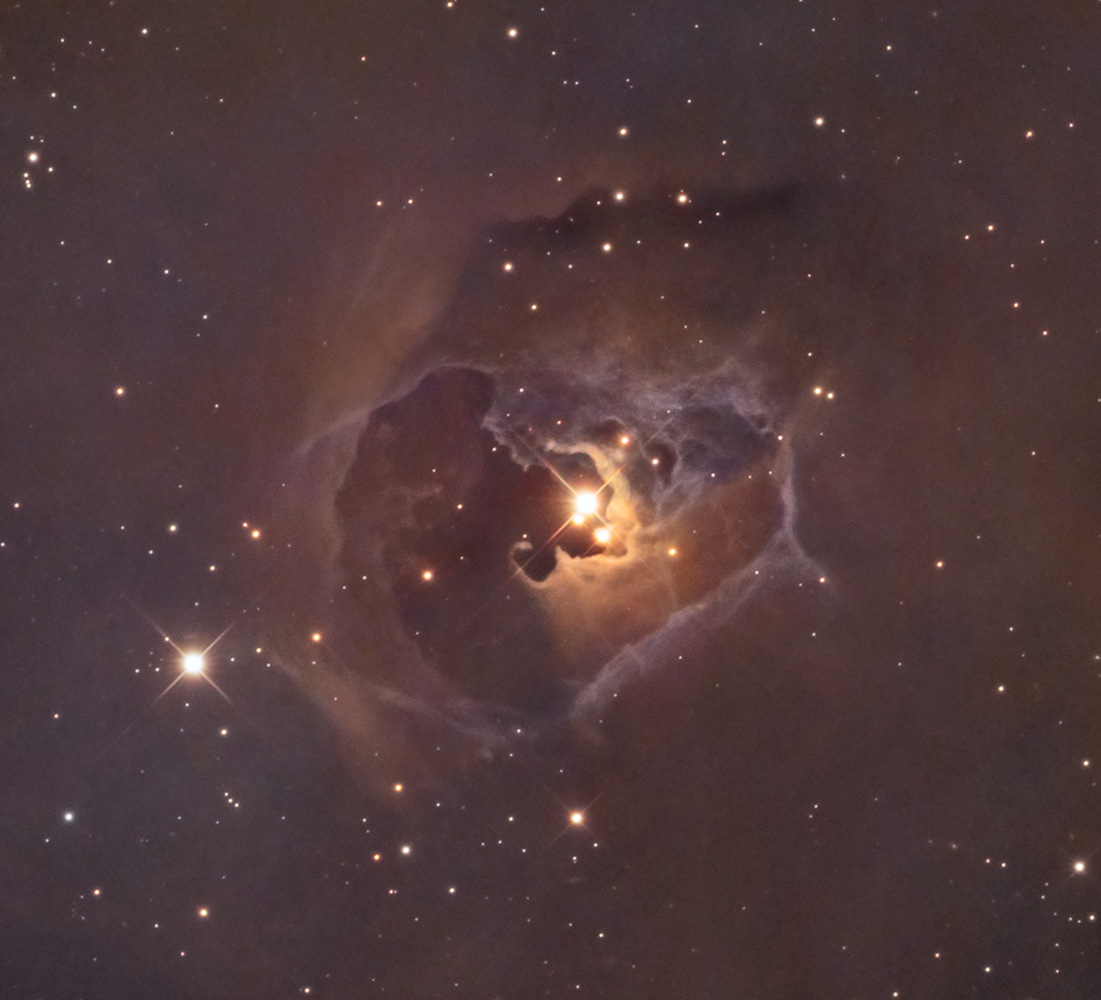
Herbig Ae/Be Star V1025 Tauri from the Mount Lemmon SkyCenter

== Sources ==
- The, P. S.; De Winter, D.; Perez, M. R. (1994). "A new catalogue of members and candidate members of the Herbig Ae/Be (HAEBE) stellar group". Astronomy and Astrophysics Supplement Series. 104: 315. Bibcode:1994A&AS..104..315T.
- Perez, Mario R.; Grady, Carol A. (1997). "Observational Overview of Young Intermediate-Mass Objects: Herbig Ae/Be Stars". Space Science Reviews. 82 (3–4): 407. Bibcode:1997SSRv...82..407P. doi:10.1023/A:1005064108523.
- Waters, L. B. F. M.; Waelkens, C. (1998). "Herbig Ae/Be Stars". Annual Review of Astronomy and Astrophysics. 36: 233. Bibcode:1998ARA&A..36..233W. doi:10.1146/annurev.astro.36.1.233.
- Herbig Ae/Be stars

- "Molecular Hydrogen In The Circumstellar Environment Of Herbig Ae/Be Stars" (PDF). mpia-hd.mpg.de.
