= RCW 22 =

Molecular cloud

Nebula

Observation data: J2000 epoch
- Right ascension: 09^{h} 15^{m} 36^{s}
- Declination: −31° 23′ 00″
- Constellation: Pyxis
- Designations: LBN 1086

RCW 22 is a nebula located in the southern constellation Pyxis. It is possibly a fragment of the Gum Nebula. The nebula has not yet been a subject in any scientific studies. It is located nearby Sh 2-312.
