= Gum Nebula =

Emission nebula in the constellation Vela

Supernova remnant
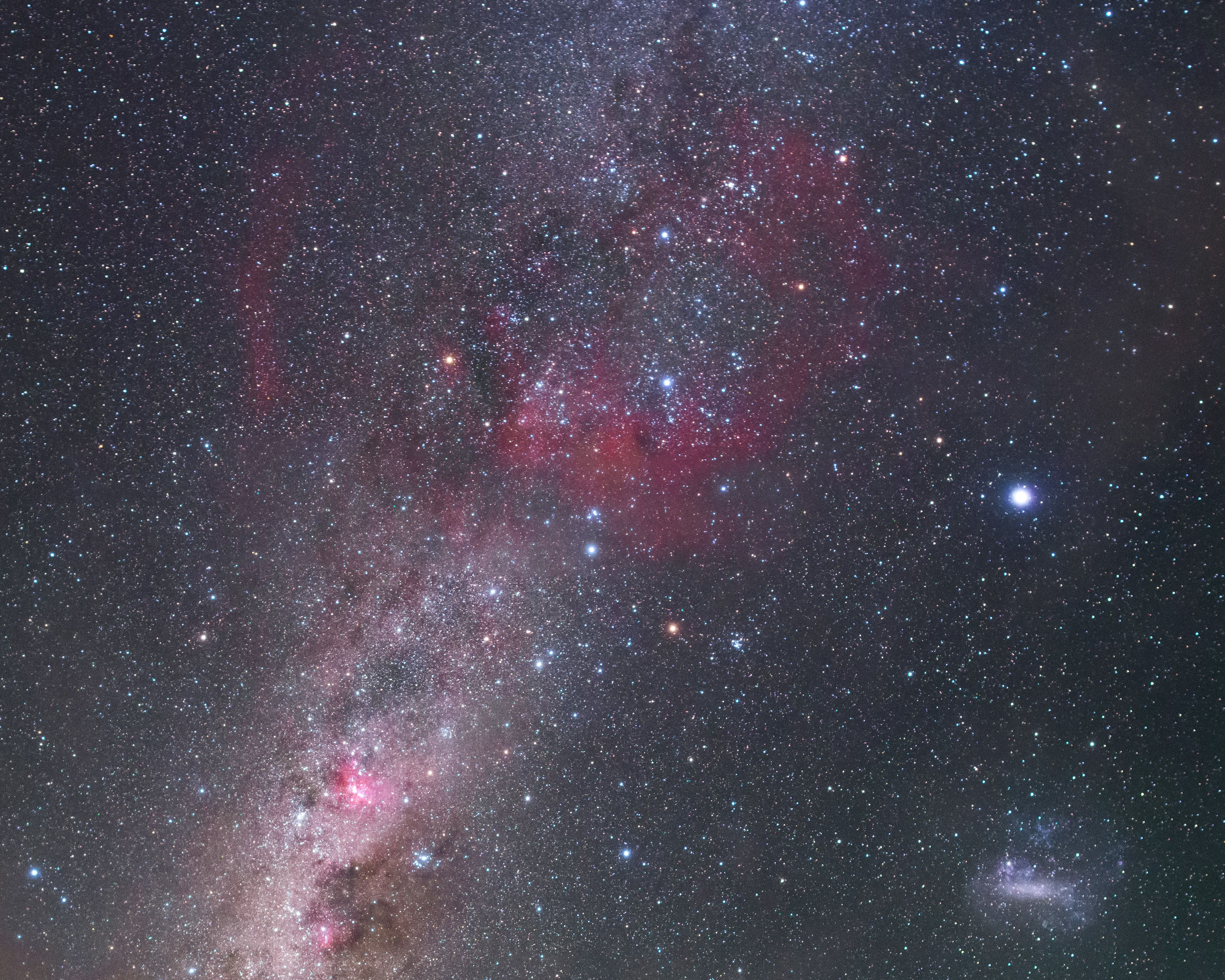
- The Gum Nebula visible as a faint nebula with bright star Canopus and LMC at the lower left.

Observation data: J2000.0 epoch
- Right ascension: 08^{h} 00^{m}
- Declination: −43° 00′
- Distance: 1470 ly (450 pc)
- Apparent magnitude (V): +12 (infrared only)
- Apparent diameter: 30°
- Constellation: Vela, Puppis

Physical characteristics
- Absolute magnitude (V): 3.73 (infrared)
- Designations: Gum 12

The Gum Nebula (Gum 12) is an emission nebula that extends across 36° in the southern constellations Vela and Puppis. It lies approximately 450 parsecs from the Earth. Hard to distinguish, it was widely believed to be the greatly expanded (and still expanding) remains of a supernova that took place about a million years ago. More recent research suggests it may be an evolved H II region. It contains the 11,000-year-old Vela Supernova Remnant, along with the Vela Pulsar.

It is located between the two bright and massive stars system ζ Puppis (Naos) and γ^{2} Velorum (Regor), the former is closer to the edge of the cloud facing the Sun, at a distance of about 330±10 parsecs, while the latter, at about 336+8
−7 parsecs, is located closer to the center of the cloud. To its southeastern part lies the Vela Nebula, a supernova remnant that lies between the Gum Nebula and the Solar System, along the same line of sight.

The Gum Nebula is one of the largest known nebulae within the Milky Way and constitutes an important scenario for the study of the expansion of bubbles generated by supernova explosions within the environment of the galactic arms, as well as on the interaction between these and the surrounding molecular clouds; in fact, on the edges of the cloud some limited star formation phenomena are active, localized in small clouds (known as cometary globules due to their appearance). Near some of these globules some HH objects are also found, including HH 47.

== Observation ==
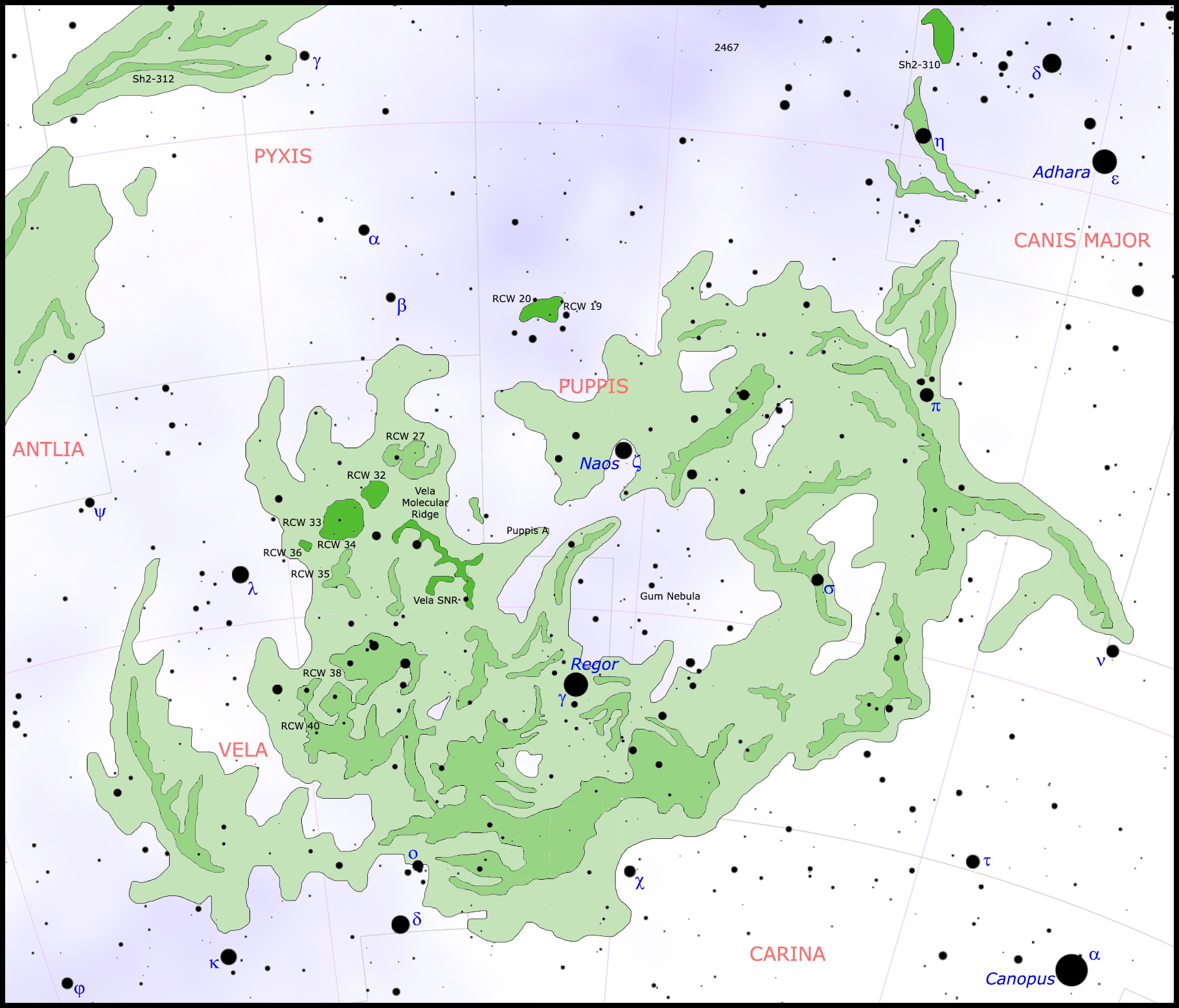
Map of the Gum Nebula

Localisation map of the Gum Nebula

Struve, Elvey, and Linke (1939) detected probable Hα emission in a spectrum centred on γ Velorum, but did not perceive the true nature of the object. In the early 1950s, the Australian astronomer Colin Stanley Gum (1924–1960) imaged this region of the southern Milky Way, discovering a large nebula covering the entire western part of the constellation of Vela, brushing the constellation of Carina to the south, and continuing into Puppis. He published the discovery of the Gum Nebula in 1952 in the journal The Observatory. The observations were made with the Commonwealth Observatory. The report of his discovery also appeared in Gum’s 1955 PhD thesis A study of diffuse southern H-alpha nebulae ("A study of southern diffuse H-alpha nebulae") (see Gum catalog).

The Gum Nebula appears as a vast and faint nebula covering the region of sky at the boundary between the constellations of Puppis and Vela; its size is such that it appears to be the largest nebula in the sky. It is not visible optically, nor with an amateur telescope, because its filaments are very faint; much of its emission is in the infrared and Hα bands. Its position is strongly southern, therefore visibility from the Northern Hemisphere is greatly reduced: in fact the cloud is fully visible only from lower northern latitudes, south of the 35th–36th parallel north, while beyond 50° N it becomes completely invisible. From the Southern Hemisphere, on the contrary, it is well observable during almost all nights of the year (particularly in the months between December and April). (Note: An average declination of 43°S corresponds to an angular distance from the south celestial pole of 47°; the southernmost point (near IC 2391, see Wikisky.org) lies at a declination of about 53°S. This means that south of 37°S the object is entirely circumpolar, while north of 37°N the object never rises completely.)

The Gum nebula was photographed during Apollo 16 while the command module was in the double umbra of the Sun and Earth, using high-speed Kodak film.

== Description ==
The Gum Nebula contains about 32 cometary globules. These dense cloud cores are subject to such strong radiation from O-type stars γ^{2} Vel and ζ Pup and formerly the progenitor of the Vela Supernova Remnant that the cloud cores evaporate away from the hot stars into comet-like shapes. Like ordinary Bok globules, cometary globules are believed to be associated with star formation. A notable object inside one of these cometary globules is the Herbig-Haro object HH 46/47.

The main ionizing sources are the Vela OB2 association (including Gamma Velorum cluster and the P Puppis cluster), Zeta Puppis and the OB association Trumpler 10. The star cluster NGC 2547 formed 100 pc more distant than Vela OB2 and is an interloper. The Vela OB2 association is surrounded by the so-called "IRAS Vela Shell", located in the south of the Gum Nebula. The star clusters NGC 2547, Trumpler 10, NGC 2451B, Collinder 135 and Collinder 140 all have similar ages of about 30 Myrs. It is suggested that a few stars exploded in supernovae about 30 Myrs ago in the center of the Gum Nebula and triggered the formation of stars in the region.

== Associated star formation phenomena ==
The shock wave caused by the expansion of the Gum Nebula and the intense ultraviolet radiation from the region's massive stars have eroded and compressed gas in surrounding clouds, in many cases promoting star formation; these phenomena particularly involve the birth of low- and intermediate-mass stars.

=== Cometary globules ===
The best-known objects associated with the Gum Nebula and the IRAS Vela Shell are the so-called cometary globules. These structures are remnants of molecular clouds whose outer layers were stripped away by powerful ultraviolet radiation from ζ Puppis and γ^{2} Velorum; the gas that composed these layers forms a long tail oriented away from the radiation sources and the ionization front. What remains of these clouds is the dense core, with properties similar to those of Bok globules, within which star formation takes place, particularly of low-mass stars. According to another model, the energy source that stripped the clouds' outer layers was not ultraviolet radiation from the two stars, but the powerful shock wave produced by the supernova explosions that generated the nebula. The known globules in this region are 36, and most are concentrated around the galactic coordinates l = 260°; b = −4°, in an intermediate position between the centre of the Gum Nebula and that of the IRAS Vela Shell.

The most notable of these cometary globules lies in the northeastern part of the Gum Nebula in an isolated position and is catalogued as CG22; it has a tail extending for more than one degree, corresponding to about 8 parsecs at a distance of 450 parsecs, and a dense head 2′ in diameter. Inside it is the source IRAS 08267−3336, coincident with a Class II young stellar object designated Wray 220, a T Tauri star probably surrounded by a protoplanetary disk; its luminosity is 13 L_{☉}.

Among the other globules, CG1 stands out: its particularly thick tail reaches 25′; the head cocoon has a diameter of about 2′, and the total mass of the structure is about 45 M_{☉}. A key characteristic of this globule is the presence at its tip of the Herbig Ae/Be star NX Puppis, whose age is about 6 million years and whose spectral class, A0–1III or perhaps F0–2III, indicates a high-mass star; it is part of a binary star system in which the secondary component, NX Puppis B, lies at a separation of 0.126″. A third, more distant object is also linked to this system: a T Tauri star (designated NX Puppis C) with a mass of 0.3 M_{☉}.

Another large globule is CG4, located on the southern edge of the nebula and associated with another globule visible farther north, CG6; their masses are 50 M_{☉} and 5.5 M_{☉}, respectively. Both are part of a nebulous complex known as Sa 101. This region offers an opportunity to understand what the original clouds may have looked like before radiation from the most massive stars eroded their outer layers, transforming them into cometary globules: the cloud from which CG4 and CG6 derive was heavily influenced by the powerful ultraviolet radiation of γ^{2} Velorum, which deeply eroded its gas and formed the globules observed today; the background Sa 101, by contrast, was shielded longer by this cloud and remained largely intact for a longer period, until (in astronomically very recent times) the star's radiation reached it, compressing it and triggering star formation within it. The presence of young stellar objects in the cloud was confirmed by the discovery of seven stars with Hα emission, catalogued as CG-Hα1 through CG-Hα7, whose spectral characteristics and association with dark clouds suggest that they are T Tauri stars.

On the northern edge, just southwest of RCW 19, is a complex system formed by three globules (catalogued as CG30, CG31, and CG38), whose broad tails visually overlap toward the north. The most notable feature of this region is the presence of the jet HH 120, a HH object located within globule CG30 and composed of 11 denser condensations of gas, labelled A through K; the source of the radiation that excites the gas, and the source illuminating the associated reflection nebula, is the star CG30-IRS4, located to the southeast and prominent in infrared images; it was also catalogued by IRAS as IRAS 08076−3556. According to some studies, CG30-IRS4 is a very young protostar of Class I or even Class 0, surrounded by a disk with a mass of about 0.07 M_{☉}; the dense globule enveloping it has a mass of 8 M_{☉}. Another star within the cloud is CG-IRS4. The reflection nebula illuminated by the star likely represents the wall of a cavity carved by the jet originating from the star itself. Studies of HH 120 and nearby HH 948 (smaller than the former) have shown that both originate from CG30-IRS4, which therefore appears to be a binary or perhaps multiple protostar. Also present is HH 949, which shows eight distinct components (catalogued A through G). Among the smaller cometary globules is CG13, with a long tail and a dense core containing a nebulous F-class star (catalogued as Bernes 136); only 15′ from this star is a source of Hα radiation known as CG13-Hα 8, whose distance from the nebular globule is about 2 parsecs.

=== Other objects ===
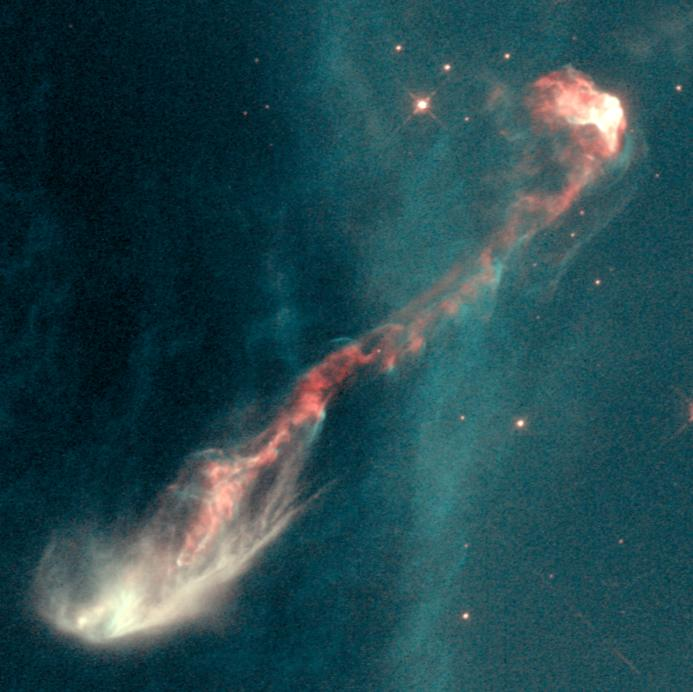
The bipolar jet HH 46/47, photographed by the Hubble Space Telescope

Among other notable objects, the best known is HH 46/47, located on the southern edge of the Gum Nebula at the tip of a dark, cometary-looking cloud known as Sa 111; because of its relative ease of observation and the high collimation of the bipolar outflow, the system has been the subject of numerous studies. The main body of the jet consists of HH47A, from which two faint arc-shaped structures extend; the opposite end of the jet is HH46. The long, knotty trail connecting the two main features is catalogued as HH47B. The jet source is hidden within the globule. The nearer lobe (HH46 and HH47A, B, and D) is the side oriented toward the Sun; the more distant lobe, directed away from us, is identified as HH47C. At an average distance of about 450 parsecs, the outflow has a length of about 3 parsecs, and its age has been estimated at about 3 million years.

The central part of HH46 has the characteristics of a reflection nebula, probably illuminated by a T Tauri star known as HH46 IRS; over the years it has been observed that the luminosity of the central nebula is not constant but varies significantly, probably due to the variability of the central star. HH47A shows high electron density, while also showing strong excitation of its gas; the other components show lower electron density but a higher excitation level.

Part of the gas in Sa 111 is illuminated by three stars, catalogued in 1975 together with their reflection nebulae as vdBH 12a, vdBH12b and vdBH 16; all three stars belong to the same nebulous complex linked to the Gum Nebula. The first two are connected to Sa 111 and adjacent Sa 109, while vdBH 16 illuminates Sa 112. The latter is a pre-main-sequence binary star, located just 1′ north of another physically nearby young star coincident with IRAS 08261−5100.

Sa 109 is a cloud composed of two denser objects, catalogued in 1981 as Re 4 and Re 5, within which distinct star-formation processes occur. The first contains an HH object catalogued as HH 188, and an infrared source identified by IRAS as IRAS 08194−4921, which supplies the energy for the HH object; this source coincides with the star Re 4 FIR (FIR being the acronym for far infrared), probably a binary system, as suggested by the presence of two jets originating from it; it is composed of two Class 0 or Class I sources with an accretion disk. A second star seen in the direction of the cloud, of spectral class K5, is not physically associated with it, being in the foreground. Re 5 appears as a cometary-looking cloud associated with an infrared source deeply embedded within it, catalogued as IRAS 08196−4931.

== Popular culture ==
The Gum Nebula is explored by the crew of the Starship Titan in the Star Trek novel Orion's Hounds.

== Gallery ==
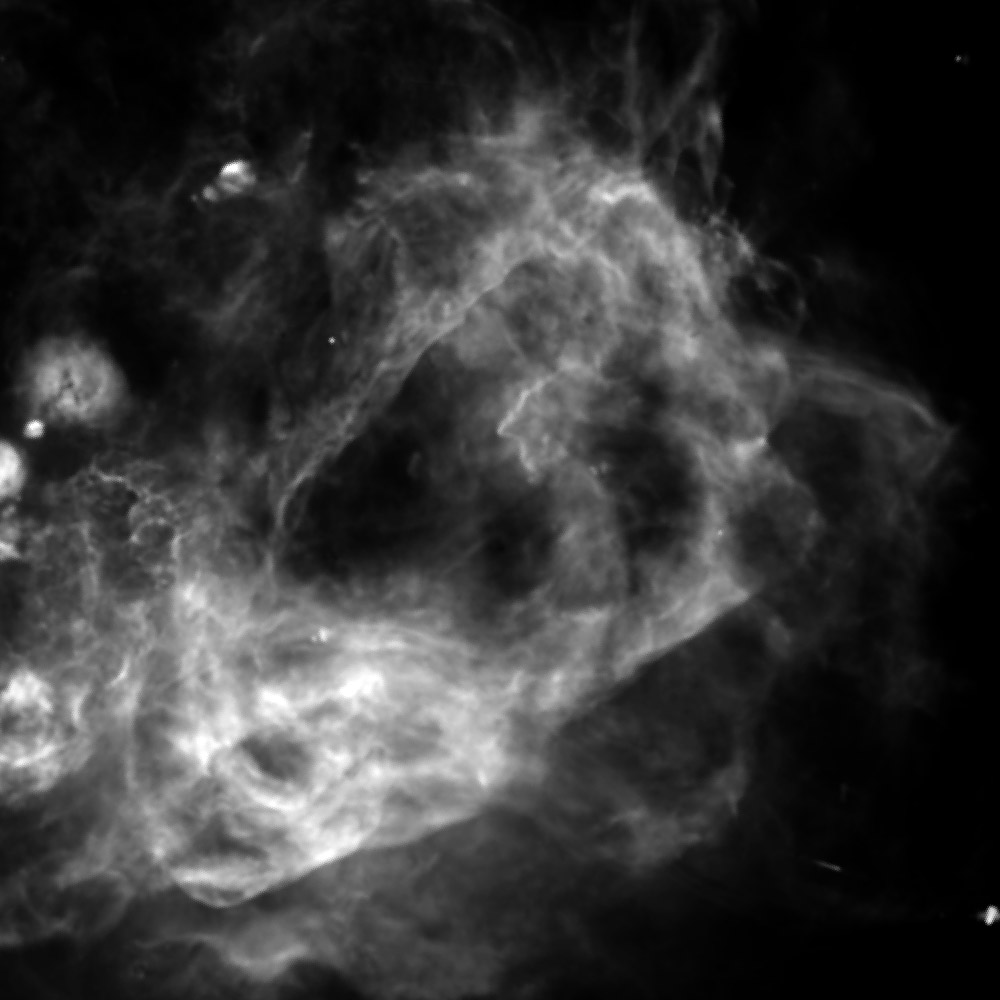
H-alpha Image of Gum Nebula

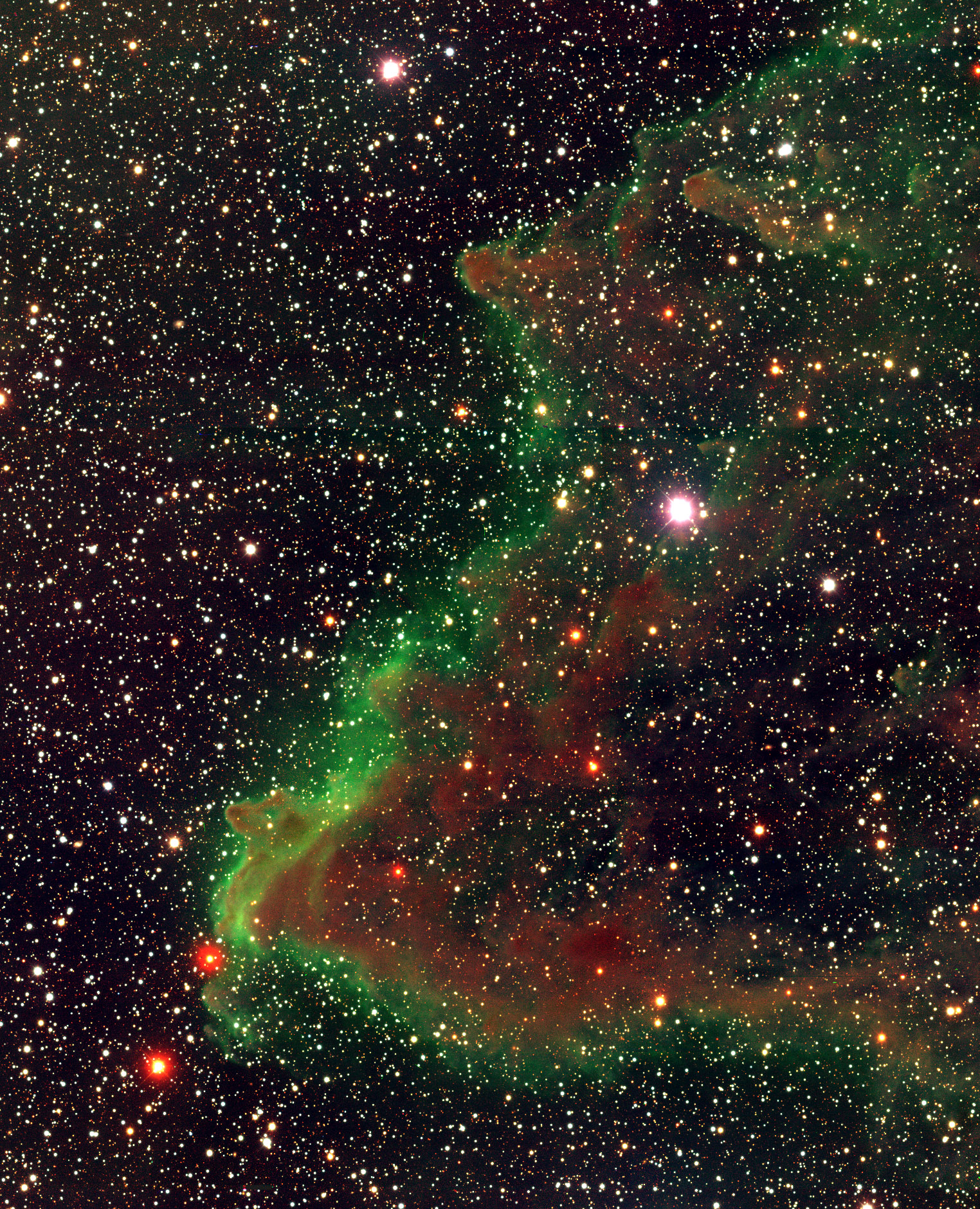
Clouds near the center of the Gum Nebula

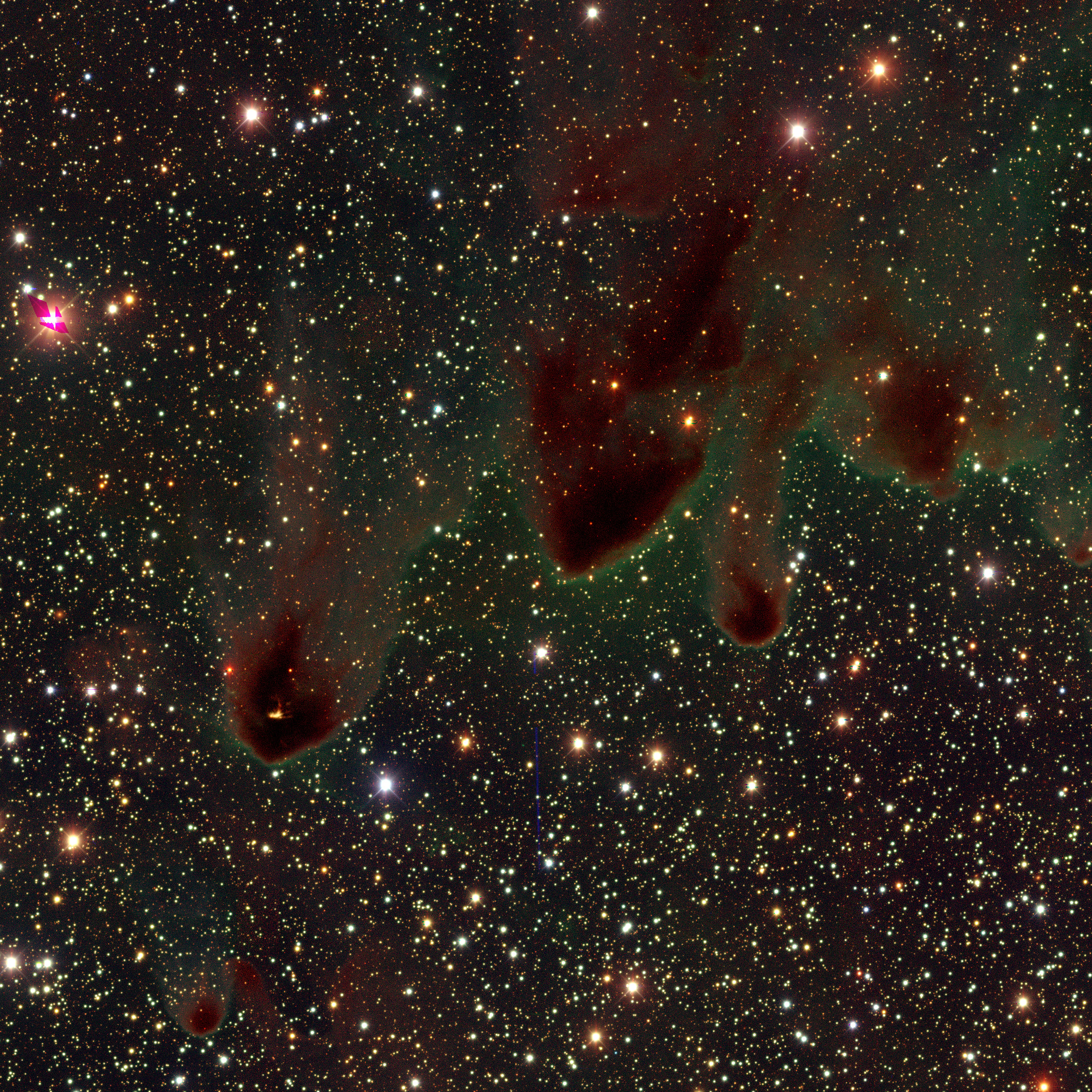
Cometary Nebulae 30, 31 and 38 in the Gum Nebula. It also contains HH 120.

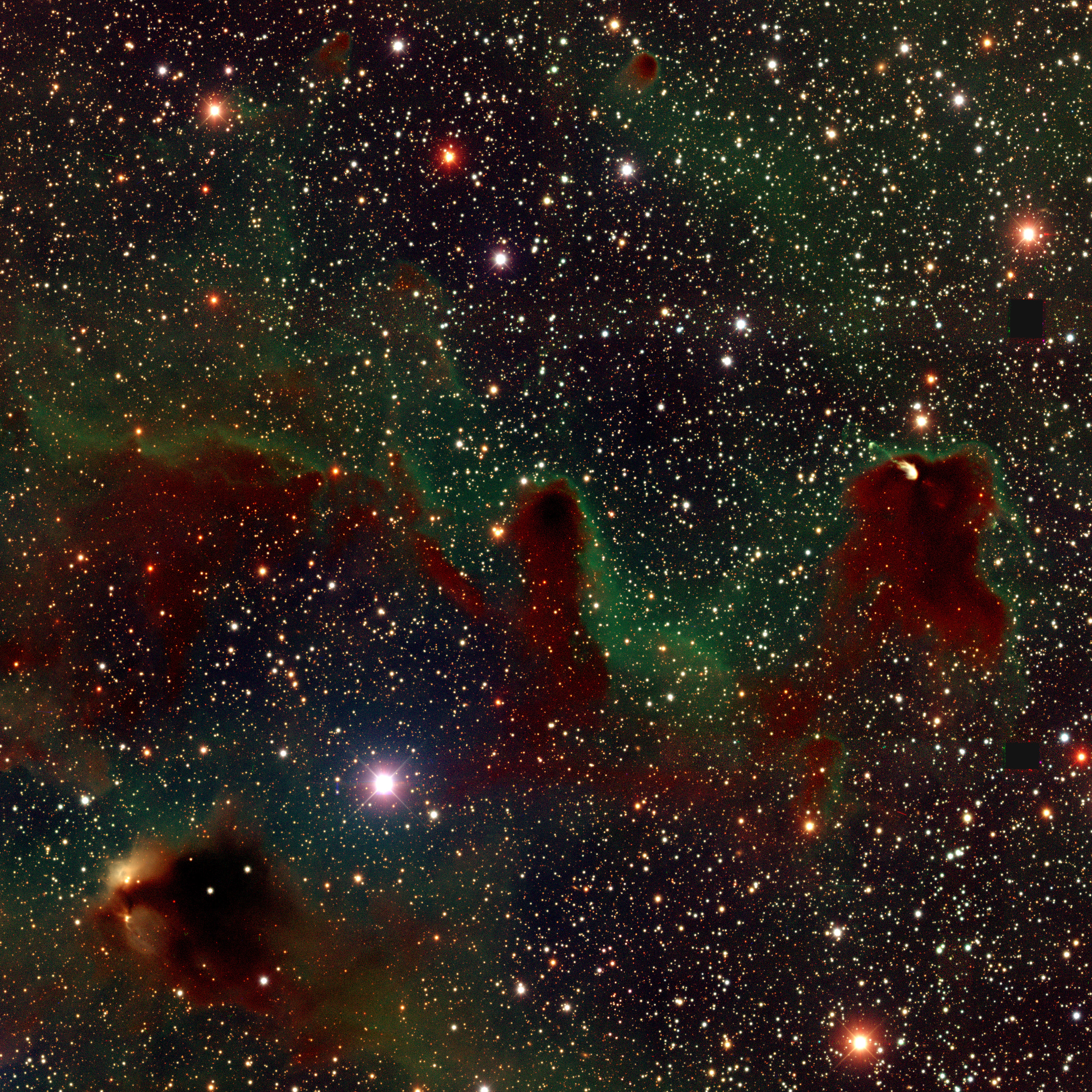
Environment in the Gum Nebula with HH 46/7 (middle-right)

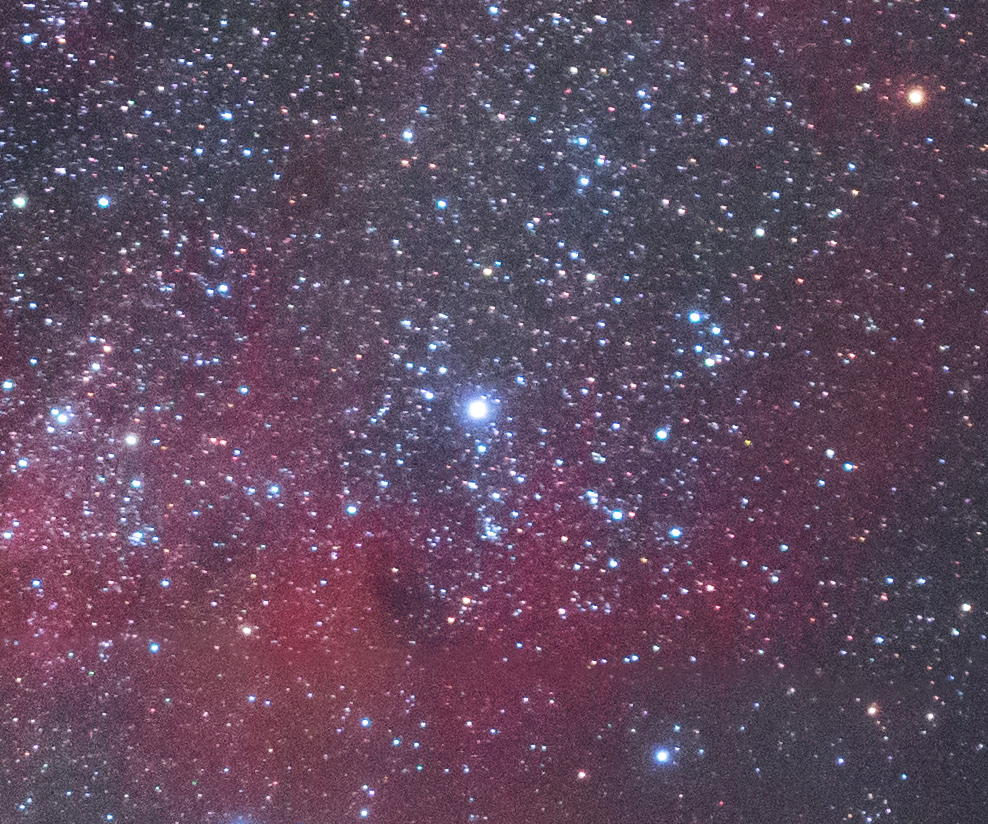
Vela OB2 with its brightest star Gamma2 Velorum is located in the Gum Nebula. The image also contains the smaller star cluster NGC 2547 in the lower left part.

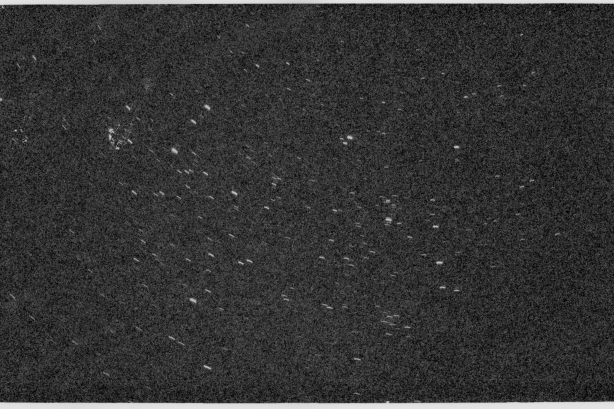
One of 4 images of the Gum Nebula photographed by Apollo 16 in 1972. AS16-127-20024.

== See also ==
- CG 4
- Barnard's Loop
- Vela star-forming regions
