= CG-4 =

CG-4 may refer to:

- Waco CG-4, an American military glider of World War II
- CG 4, a star-forming region in the constellation Puppis
