= Sh 2-312 =

Molecular cloud

Sharpless 2-312
Nebula
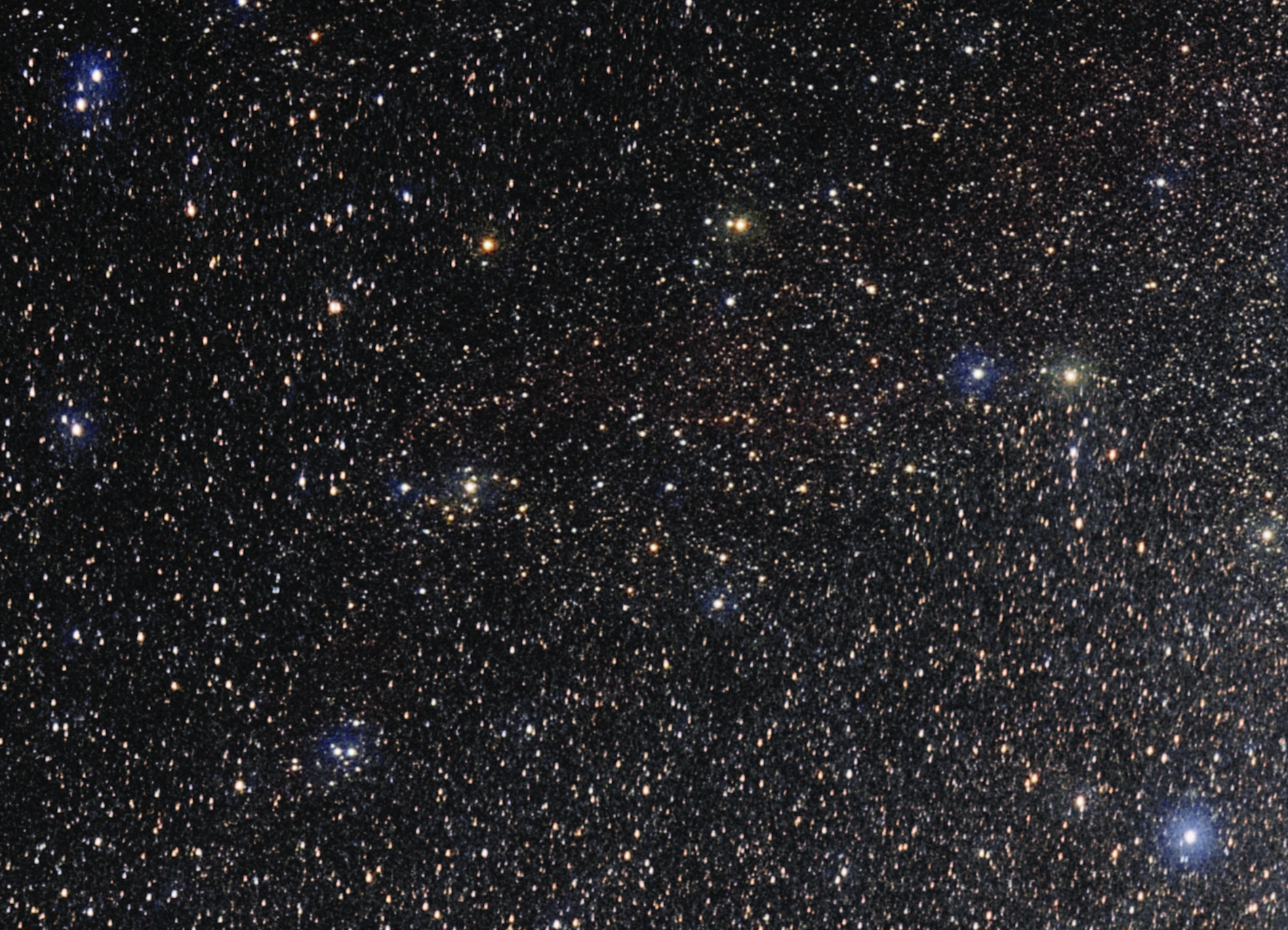
- Sh 2-312 seen very faintly, Gamma Pyxidis in lower-right corner

Observation data: J2000 epoch
- Right ascension: 08^{h} 59^{m} 12^{s}
- Declination: −25° 41′ 00″
- Apparent magnitude (V): 17.82
- Apparent dimensions (V): 12° x 3°
- Constellation: Pyxis
- Designations: LBN 1077

Sh 2-312 is a nebula in the southern constellation of Pyxis. It is very large and diffuse, making it largely ignored and unstudied outside of its relation to the Gum Nebula. Sh 2-312 is located approximately 56 parsecs away from RCW 22, another nebula postulated to be a part of the larger Gum Nebula, which is itself estimated to be approximately 300 parsecs in width based on angular diameter approximation. It responds well to Hydrogen-alpha filters; however, it requires extended exposure time to become visible during observation.
