= Zeta Puppis =

Star in the constellation of Puppis

ζ Puppis
- Location of ζ Puppis (circled)

Observation data Epoch J2000 Equinox ICRS
- Constellation: Puppis
- Right ascension: 08^{h} 03^{m} 35.05^{s}
- Declination: −40° 00′ 11.3″
- Apparent magnitude (V): 2.24 – 2.26

Characteristics
- Evolutionary stage: Blue supergiant
- Spectral type: O4If(n)p
- U−B color index: −1.09
- B−V color index: −0.27
- Variable type: rotating?

Astrometry
Proper motion (μ)	RA: −29.71 mas/yr Dec.: 16.68 mas/yr
Parallax (π)	3.01±0.10 mas
Distance	1,080 ± 40 ly (330 ± 10 pc)
Absolute magnitude (M_{V})	−6.23

Details
Mass	25.3±5.3 M_{☉}
Radius	13.72±0.49 (equatorial) R_{☉} 11.25±0.19 (polar) R_{☉}
Luminosity (bolometric)	376,000+21,000 −20,000 L_{☉}
Surface gravity (log g)	3.309±0.069 (equatorial); 3.734±0.014 (polar) cgs
Temperature	36,700 (equatorial); 44,350±340 (polar) K
Metallicity [Fe/H]	0.34 dex
Rotation	1.78 days
Rotational velocity (v sin i)	213±7 km/s
Age	2.2+0.6 −0.5 to 3.56+0.77 −0.75 Myr

Other designations
- Naos, Suhail Hadar, ζ Puppis, ζ Pup, Zeta Pup, CPD−39°2011, FK5 306, GC 10947, HD 66811, HIP 39429, HR 3165, PPM 312524, SAO 198752.

Database references
SIMBAD	data

Zeta Puppis (ζ Puppis, abbreviated Zeta Pup, ζ Pup), formally named Naos /naʊs/, is the brightest star in the constellation of Puppis.

The spectral class of O4 means this is one of the hottest, and most luminous, stars visible to the naked eye. It is one of the sky's few naked-eye class O-type stars as well as one of the closest to Earth. It is a blue supergiant, one of the most luminous stars in the Milky Way. Visually it is over 10,000 times brighter than the Sun, but its high temperature means that most of its radiation is in the ultraviolet and its bolometric luminosity is over 500,000 times that of the Sun. It is also the 72nd brightest star in terms of apparent magnitude from Earth. It is a runaway star, meaning it has an unusually large space velocity, probably caused by being ejected from a close binary system when its companion exploded as a supernova.

Zeta Puppis is typical of O-type stars in having an extremely strong stellar wind, measured at 2,500 km/s, which sees the star shed more than a millionth of its mass each year, or about 10 million times that shed by the Sun over a comparable time period.

== Nomenclature ==
ζ Puppis (Latinised to Zeta Puppis) is the star's Bayer designation.

It bears the name Naos, from the Greek ναύς "ship", and in Arabic Suhail Hadar (سُهَيْل حَضَار). In 2016, the International Astronomical Union organized a Working Group on Star Names (WGSN) to catalogue and standardize proper names for stars. The WGSN approved the name Naos for this star on 21 August 2016 and it is now so entered in the IAU Catalog of Star Names.

== Namesake ==
USS Naos (AK-105) was a United States Navy Crater class cargo ship named after the star.

== Physical characteristics ==
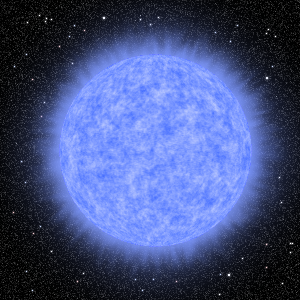
Artistic depiction of Zeta Puppis

Zeta Puppis has been extensively studied because of the rarity of such hot massive stars and its relative closeness to Earth, but its physical parameters and distance are still poorly known. It would be a valuable step on the cosmic distance ladder, clarifying the distance of other high luminosity stars in the Milky Way galaxy and external galaxies.

The spectral type is O4If(n)p. O4 indicates a hot massive hydrogen-burning star, typically 40,000–44,000 K. The "f" indicates that the spectrum has emission lines of ionised helium and nitrogen, not uncommon in somewhat evolved hot O stars and typically identified by the composite emission and absorption profile of the 468.6nm He_{II} spectral line. The "n" (for nebulous) indicates broadened absorption lines, caused by rapid rotation of the star, in this case over 220 km/s at the equator. The "p" is a general spectral indicator of peculiarity. This combination of spectral characters is unusual because evolved hot stars are expected to rotate relatively slowly after braking by a strong stellar wind, and only 8 stars of this type are known in the Milky Way. The spectral type complicates determination of physical parameters as the standard spectral luminosity indicator lines are peculiar and this type of star cannot be fully modelled. The enhanced helium and nitrogen and the lower surface gravity indicates some degree of evolution away from the zero age main sequence and Zeta Puppis is ranked as a supergiant. Naos has sufficient mass to explode as a supernova.

The angular size of Zeta Puppis has been measured interferometrically to be 0.41 mas, and photometrically to be 0.38 mas.

== Variability ==
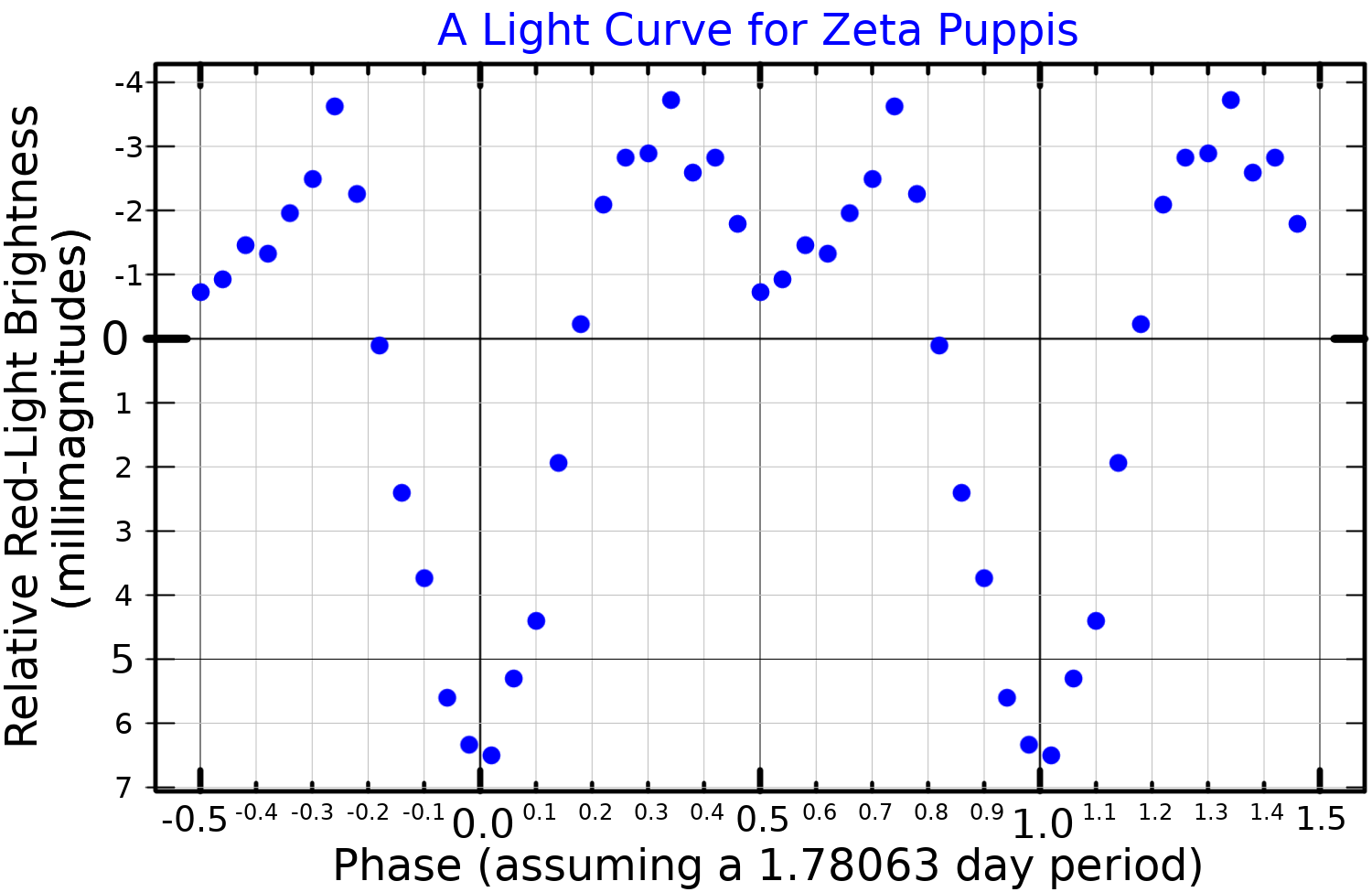
A red-light light curve for Zeta Puppis, adapted from Ramiaramanantsoa et al. (2018)

The brightness of Zeta Puppis varies slightly but regularly. Its apparent magnitude varies between a peak of 2.24 and a minimum of 2.26 over 1.78 days. The variations had been thought to be the due to the pulsations of an α Cygni variable, but are too predictable and regular. The eclipse-like light curve is now thought to be due to rotation of the star which has large irregular features at the base of its dense stellar wind.

It also shows variations in H_{α} spectral line profiles and x-ray luminosity on timescales less than a day.

== Distance ==
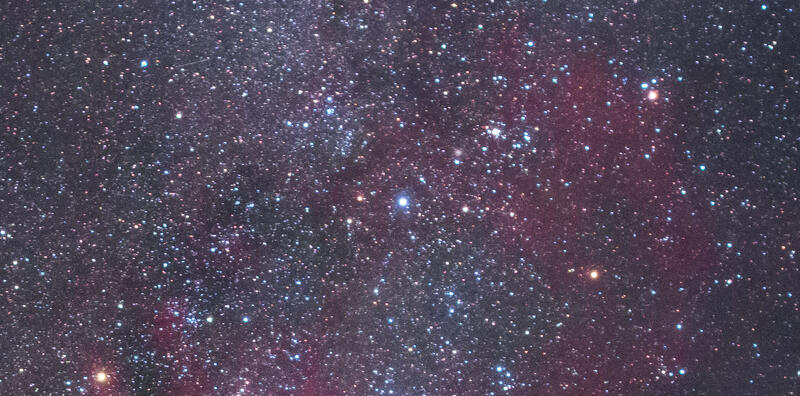
Image of Naos in Gum Nebula

The distance of Zeta Puppis is disputed, most commonly being considered to be 332±11 pc based on its Hipparcos parallax, or 460±40 pc based on its expected physical properties. Its association with objects such as the Gum Nebula and γ^{2} Velorum is also used as a method to establish its distance.

The physical properties of the star depend strongly on its distance, with its bolometric luminosity being 813,000 L_{☉} at 460 pc and only about 380,000 L_{☉} at 332 pc. Its rotational velocity and period constrain the possible distances and inclination of the star. The rotational period was long considered to be just over five days, being the period of certain variations observed in its spectrum. However, it is now thought that less obvious brightness variations with a period of 1.78 days are caused by bright areas on the surface of the star as it rotates. With the projected equatorial rotational velocity of 219 km/s, this means that the star is rotating at close to its break-up velocity and that the equator must be inclined less than about 33° to us.

== Helium ==
In 1896, Williamina Fleming observed mysterious spectral lines from Zeta Puppis, which fit the Rydberg formula if half-integers were used instead of whole integers. It was later found that these were due to ionized helium.

== Origin ==
Early suggestions for the birthplace of Zeta Puppis were the very young Vela R2 stellar association at around 800 pc and the Vela OB2 association at 450 pc. Neither origin is satisfactory. A distance of 800pc requires an abnormally high luminosity, while the Vela OB2 association is much older than Zeta Puppis and the space velocity does not lead back to that cluster.

Many physical models and the original Hipparcos parallax measurements did lead to a distance value of around 450 pc, but the revised Hipparcos reduction gave a much lower distance near 333 pc. A recent dynamical study points to Zeta Puppis originating in the Trumpler 10 OB association at around 300 pc, but this is also a much older cluster and physical models still lead to a distance of 450–600 pc.

Zeta Puppis shows a high space velocity and very high rotation rate, and it has been speculated that it is a runaway star resulting from a supernova in a binary system, possibly the progenitor of the Gum Nebula. Models of binary systems are able to reproduce the properties of Zeta Puppis following mass transfer from a companion which then exploded as a supernova. This can explain the observed properties which are inconsistent with single star evolution.
