= Gamma Velorum =

Star system in the constellation Vela

γ^{2} Velorum
- Image of star Gamma Velorum, filaments of Vela supernova remnant can be seen in the lower right side, while the red nebula around the star is part of Gum Nebula

Observation data Epoch J2000 Equinox ICRS
- Constellation: Vela
- Right ascension: 08^{h} 09^{m} 31.95013^{s}
- Declination: −47° 20′ 11.7108″
- Apparent magnitude (V): 1.83 (1.81–1.87)

Characteristics
- Spectral type: WC8 + O7.5III
- U−B color index: −0.94
- B−V color index: −0.25
- Variable type: Wolf–Rayet

Astrometry
Radial velocity (R_{v})	+12±1 km/s
Proper motion (μ)	RA: –6.07 mas/yr Dec.: +10.43 mas/yr
Parallax (π)	2.92±0.30 mas
Distance	1,095.9 ± 3.3 ly (336±1 pc)
Absolute magnitude (M_{V})	−4.6 + −6.0

Orbit
Primary	O
Secondary	WR
Period (P)	78.5227±0.0016 days
Semi-major axis (a)	(3.479±0.008)×10^{−3}" (1.170±0.004 au)
Eccentricity (e)	0.320±0.004
Inclination (i)	64.9±0.3°
Longitude of the node (Ω)	247.0±0.2°
Periastron epoch (T)	60,250.37±0.12 MJD
Argument of periastron (ω) (secondary)	67.3±0.4°
Semi-amplitude (K_{1}) (primary)	38.4±2 km/s
Semi-amplitude (K_{2}) (secondary)	122±2 km/s

Details

WR
Mass	8.3±0.7 M_{☉}
Radius	3.4±0.5 R_{☉}
Luminosity	110,000±40,000 L_{☉}
Surface gravity (log g)	4.85 cgs
Temperature	57,100±1,700 K
Rotational velocity (v sin i)	220±20 km/s
Age	6.8 Myr

O
Mass	26.4±0.5 M_{☉}
Radius	13.5±1.0 R_{☉}
Luminosity	250,000±40,000 L_{☉}
Surface gravity (log g)	3.47 cgs
Temperature	35,000±300 K
Age	6.8 Myr

Other designations
- Regor, Suhail Al-Muhlif, CD−46°3847, FK5 309, HD 68273, HIP 39953, HR 3207, SAO 219504, WR 11

Database references
SIMBAD	data

Gamma Velorum is a double star in the constellation Vela, with each of the two stars a spectroscopic binary. This name is the Bayer designation for the star, which is Latinised from γ Velorum and abbreviated γ Vel. At a combined magnitude of +1.72, it is one of the brightest stars in the night sky, and contains by far the closest and brightest Wolf–Rayet star. It has the traditional name Suhail al Muhlif and the modern name Regor /ˈriːɡɔːr/, but neither is approved by the International Astronomical Union, making it the brightest star by apparent magnitude without an IAU approved name.

The γ Velorum system includes a pair of stars separated by 41″, each of which is also a spectroscopic binary system. γ^{2} Velorum, the brighter of the visible pair, contains the Wolf–Rayet star and a blue supergiant, while γ^{1} Velorum contains a blue giant and an unseen companion.

== Distance ==
Location of γ Velorum (circled)

Gamma Velorum is close enough to have accurate parallax measurements as well as distance estimates by more indirect means. The Hipparcos parallax for γ^{2} implies a distance of 342 parsecs (pc). A dynamical parallax derived from calculations of the orbital parameters gives a value of 336 pc, similar to spectrophotometric derivations. A VLTI-based interferometry measurement of the distance gives a slightly larger value of 368±51 pc. All these distances are somewhat less than the commonly assumed distance of 450 pc for the Vela OB2 association which is the closest grouping of young massive stars.

== Stellar system ==
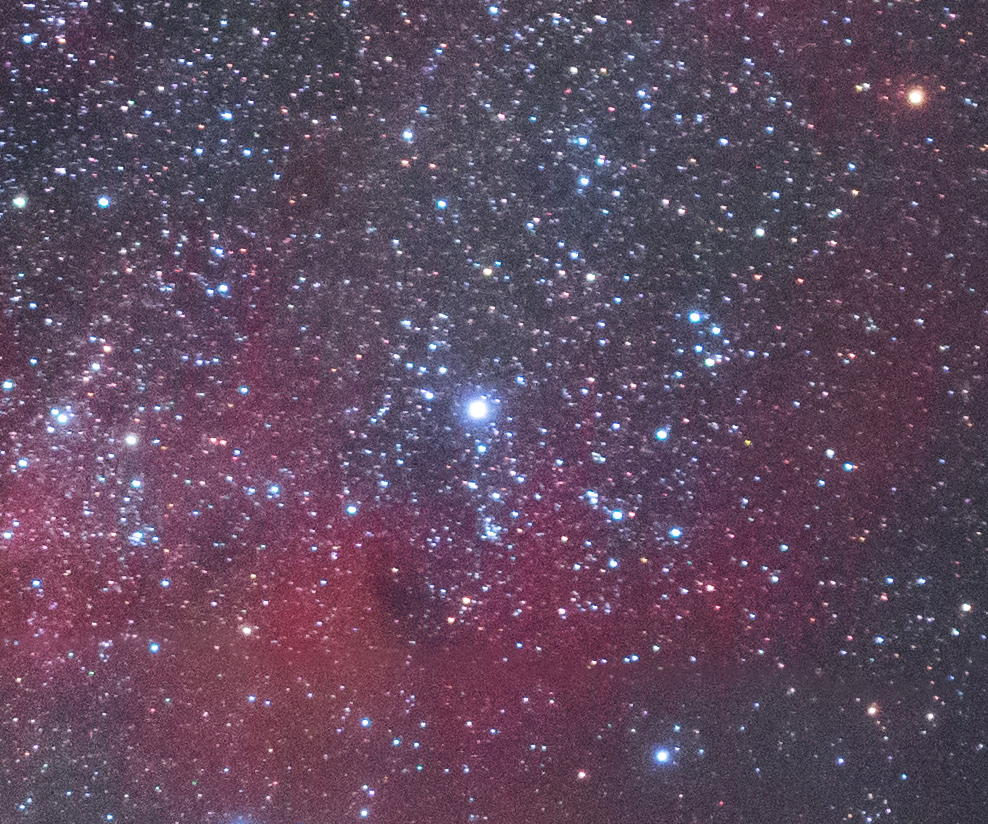
Vela OB2 with γ Velorum being the brightest star in the upper left. The image also shows the smaller star cluster NGC 2547 in the lower left part. The nebulosity around the stars is part of the Gum Nebula.

The Gamma Velorum system is composed of at least four stars. The brightest member, γ^{2} Velorum or γ Velorum A, is a spectroscopic binary composed of a blue supergiant of spectral class O7.5 (~30 M_{☉}), and a massive Wolf–Rayet star (~9 M_{☉}, originally ~35 M_{☉}). The binary has an orbital period of 78.5 days and separation varying from 0.8 to 1.6 astronomical units. Both the Wolf–Rayet star and the blue supergiant are likely to end their lives as Type Ib supernovae; they are among the nearest supernova candidates to the Sun. The Wolf–Rayet star has traditionally been regarded as the primary since its emission lines dominate the spectrum, but the O star is visually brighter, more luminous and also more massive. For clarity, the components are now often referred to as WR and O.

γ^{2} Velorum has been revealed as a gamma-ray emitter on the basis of Fermi measurements showing a modulation fully compliant with its orbital period. This discovery allows this system to be part of the category of Particle-Accelerating Colliding-Wind Binaries (PACWB), binary systems made of massive stars whose winds collide, resulting in particle acceleration.

The dimmer (apparent magnitude +4.2) γ^{1} Velorum or γ Velorum B, is a spectroscopic binary with a period of 1.48 days. Only the primary is detected and it is a blue-white giant. It is separated from the Wolf–Rayet binary by 41.2″, easily resolved with binoculars. The pair are too close to be separated without optical assistance, and they appear to the naked eye as a single star of apparent magnitude 1.72 (at the average brightness of γ^{2} of 1.83).

Gamma Velorum has several fainter companions that share a common motion and are likely to be members of the Vela OB2 association. The magnitude +7.3 CD−46°3848 is a white F0 star at is 62.3 arcseconds from the A component. At 93.5 arcseconds is another binary star, an F0 star of magnitude +9.2.

Gamma Velorum is associated with several hundred pre-main-sequence stars within less than a degree. The ages of these stars would be at least 5 million years.

γ^{1} Velorum
Observation data Epoch J2000 Equinox ICRS
- Constellation: Vela
- Right ascension: 08^{h} 09^{m} 29.3175^{s}
- Declination: −47° 20′ 43.013″
- Apparent magnitude (V): 4.27

Characteristics
- Spectral type: B2III
- U−B color index: −0.92
- B−V color index: −0.22

Astrometry
Radial velocity (R_{v})	+9.7±1 km/s
Proper motion (μ)	RA: –6.243 mas/yr Dec.: +9.475 mas/yr
Parallax (π)	2.6052±0.1235 mas
Distance	1,250 ± 60 ly (380 ± 20 pc)
Absolute magnitude (M_{V})	−3.62

Details
Mass	14 M_{☉}
Radius	9.61±0.39 R_{☉}
Luminosity	13,122 L_{☉}
Surface gravity (log g)	3.47±0.03 cgs
Temperature	20,100±100 K
Age	8 Myr

Other designations
- CD−46°3846, HD 68243, HR 3206, SAO 219501

Database references
SIMBAD	data

== Etymology ==
The Arabic name is al Suhail al Muḥlīf. al Muhlif refers to the oath-taker, and al Suhail is originally derived from a word meaning the plain. Suhail is used for at least three other stars: Canopus, λ Velorum (al Suhail al Wazn) and ζ Puppis (Suhail Hadar). Suhail is also a common Arabic male first name.

In Chinese astronomy, 天社 (Tiān Shè), meaning Celestial Earth God's Temple, refers to an asterism consisting of γ^{2} Velorum, δ Velorum, κ Velorum and b Velorum. Consequently, γ^{2} Velorum itself is known as 天社一 (Tiān Shè yī), "the First Star of Celestial Earth God's Temple".

An Indian name is Bhujanga (भुजङ्ग), meaning "serpent".

The name Regor ("Roger" spelled in reverse) was given in honor of Apollo 1 astronaut Roger Chaffee in 1967 by the Apollo 9 crew and Dr. Clarence Cleminshaw of the Griffith Observatory. It is often incorrectly claimed to have been invented as a practical joke by his fellow astronaut Gus Grissom.

Due to the exotic nature of its spectrum (bright emission lines in lieu of dark absorption lines) it is also dubbed the Spectral Gem of Southern Skies.

== See also ==
- Gamma Cassiopeiae, informally named Navi for astronaut Virgil Ivan "Gus" Grissom
- Iota Ursae Majoris, informally named Dnoces for astronaut Ed White
