= USS Naos =

Cargo ship of the United States Navy

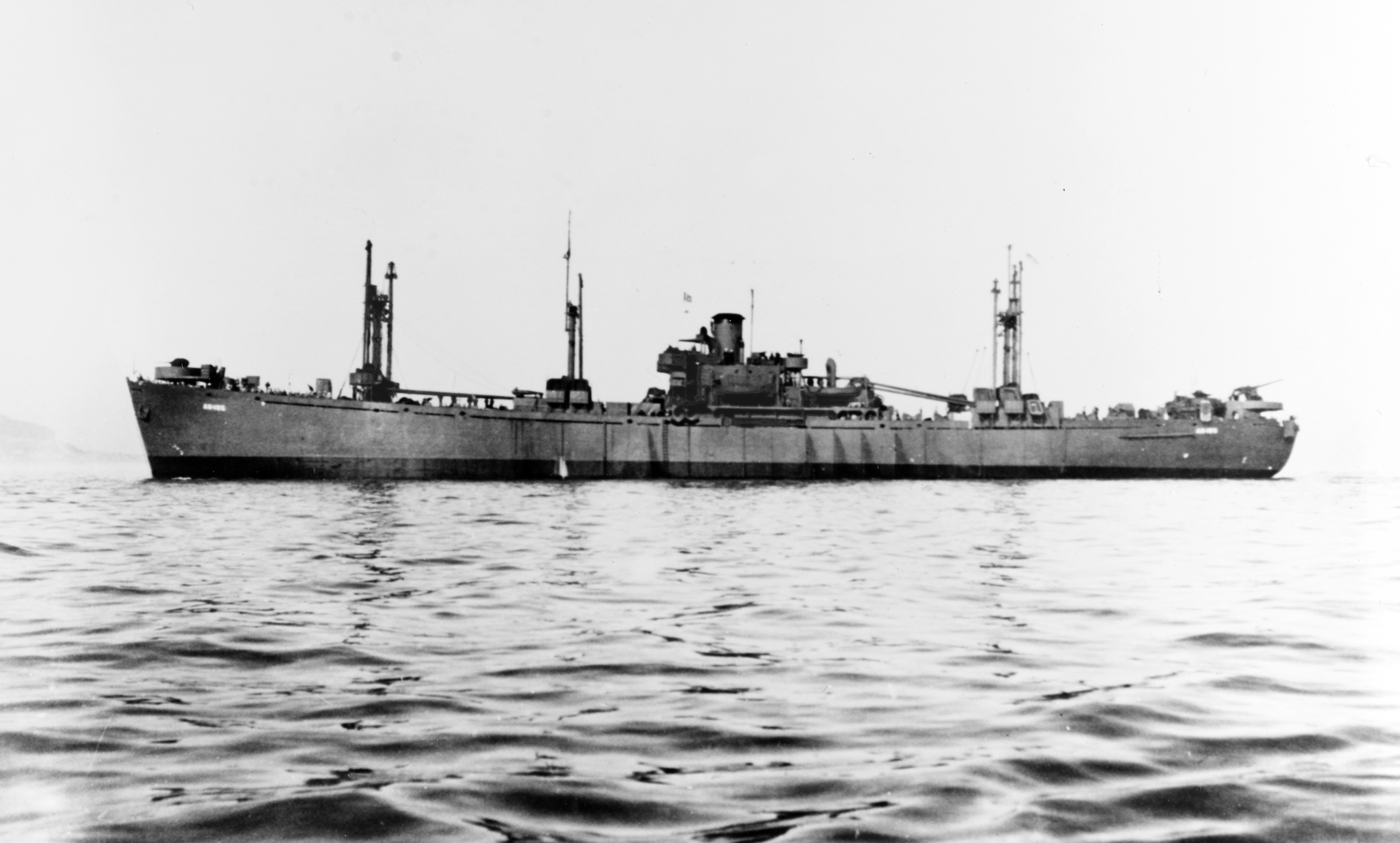
- Broadside view of USS Naos (AK-105) off San Francisco, 10 December 1943.

History

United States
- Name: William R. Nelson; Naos
- Namesake: William R. Nelson; The star Naos
- Ordered: as a Type EC2-S-C1 hull, MCE hull 1684
- Builder: California Shipbuilding Corporation, Terminal Island, Los Angeles, California
- Yard number: 217
- Way number: 5
- Laid down: 8 June 1943
- Launched: 30 June 1943
- Commissioned: 17 August 1943
- Decommissioned: 6 December 1945
- Stricken: 3 January 1946
- Identification: Hull symbol: AK-105; Code letters: NKSU
- Fate: Sold for scrapping, 30 June 1969, withdrawn, 18 February 1970

General characteristics
- Class & type: Crater-class cargo ship
- Type: Type EC2-S-C1
- Displacement: 4,023 long tons (4,088 t) (standard); 14,550 long tons (14,780 t) (full load)
- Length: 441 ft 6 in (134.57 m)
- Beam: 56 ft 11 in (17.35 m)
- Draft: 28 ft 4 in (8.64 m)
- Installed power: 2 × Combustion Engineering header-type boilers, 220psi 450°; 2,500 shp (1,900 kW)
- Propulsion: 1 × Joshua Hendy vertical triple-expansion reciprocating steam engine; 1 × shaft
- Speed: 12.5 kn (23.2 km/h; 14.4 mph)
- Capacity: 7,800 t (7,700 long tons) DWT; 444,206 cu ft (12,578.5 m^{3}) (non-refrigerated)
- Complement: 29 officers 190 enlisted
- Armament: 1 × 5 in (127 mm)/38 caliber dual purpose (DP) gun; 4 × 40 mm (1.57 in) Bofors anti-aircraft (AA) gun mounts; 6 × 20 mm (0.79 in) Oerlikon cannons AA gun mounts

USS Naos (AK-105) was a Crater-class cargo ship commissioned by the US Navy for service in World War II. Naos was named after the star Naos, in the constellation Puppis. She was responsible for delivering troops, goods and equipment to locations in the Asiatic-Pacific Theater.

== Construction ==
Naos was laid down 8 June 1943, under Maritime Commission (MARCOM) contract, MC hull No. 1684, as the Liberty ship SS William R. Nelson, by California Shipbuilding Corporation, Terminal Island, Los Angeles, California; launched 30 June 1943; and sponsored by Miss Barbara Quarg. The ship was delivered to the Navy under bareboat charter 15 July 1943, converted for Navy use by Los Angeles Shipbuilding and Dry Dock Company, San Pedro, California, and commissioned at San Pedro 17 August 1943.

== Service history ==
=== 1943–1944 ===
Departing San Pedro on 25 August, Naos loaded cargo at San Francisco and made a round trip run to Pearl Harbor and back between 28 August and 25 October. During the next month she was converted for use as a combination troop transport and cargo ship by General Engineering and Drydock Co., San Francisco. She cleared the Golden Gate 10 December, embarked 1,080 troops at Port Hueneme, and sailed for the South Pacific in convoy 12 December.

Naos reached Espiritu Santo, New Hebrides, 3 January 1944, and discharged her troops and supplies. A week later she sailed for Fiji and thus began shuttle duty throughout much of the South Pacific. Troop and cargo runs during the next eight months sent her to numerous American bases scattered from Samoa and the Ellice Islands to New Caledonia and the Solomons. While carrying more than 1,000 troops from Tulagi to New Zealand in mid-March, she was pounded by a severe tropical storm which left her relatively undamaged but damaged her escort, PC–588. Naos provided emergency aid before sending the battered escort to New Caledonia.

Maintaining her busy pace of operations, Naos departed Guadalcanal for the Admiralties. She operated out of Manus between 30 September and 25 October, thence sailed the next day to carry troop reinforcements and supplies to the Palaus. She reached Kossol Passage 31 October, and for more than a month she operated in coastal waters off the northern Palaus. During yet another tropical storm 8 November, Naos sent a volunteer crew to rescue 26 men from SC–633 which was thrown upon a reef by heavy seas. Early in December she embarked 1,114 troops and loaded US Army tanks at Angaur and Peleliu before departing in convoy 8 December. Steaming via the Russell Islands, she returned to Nouméa 22 December. Four days later she resumed shuttle runs which continued throughout the South Pacific for the next five months.

=== 1945–1946 ===
After embarking Seabee units at Nouméa, Naos sailed for Okinawa 15 May 1945. She touched at bases in the Solomons, the Marshalls, and the Western Carolines and finally arrived off Hagushi Beach, Okinawa, 11 July. She completed discharge and reload operations later that month, and on 29 July, she joined a 65-ship convoy bound for the Marianas. Sailing via Saipan, she reached Pearl Harbor 22 August.

Following the Japanese surrender, Naos returned to the western Pacific carrying repatriated prisoners-of-war and military cargo. She arrived Okinawa 2 October; and, after steaming to avoid Typhoon Louise a week later, she embarked 1,040 troops for return to the United States. She sailed 14 October, and arrived San Francisco 5 November. Naos decommissioned there 6 December 1945, and was returned to the War Shipping Administration (WSA) the same day. Her name was struck from the Navy List 3 January 1946.

== Fate ==
Resuming her original name, William R. Nelson, the ship remained in the National Defense Reserve Fleet, Suisun Bay Group, until purchased by Union Minerals and Alloys Corporation, on 30 June 1969, for $41,680.54. She was physically removed from the Reserve Fleet on 18 February 1970.

== Bibliography ==
Online resources

- "Naos". Dictionary of American Naval Fighting Ships. Naval History and Heritage Command. 12 August 2015. This article incorporates text from this source, which is in the public domain.
- "California Shipbuilding, Los Angeles CA". Shipbuilding History. 13 October 2010.
- "USS Naos (AK-105)". NavSource. 7 March 2014.
- "WILLIAM R. NELSON". United States Department of Transportation. Archived from the original on December 12, 2019.
