= Collinder 140 =

Open cluster in the constellation Canis Major

Observation data (J2000.0 epoch)
- Right ascension: 07^{h} 24^{m} 53^{s}
- Declination: −31° 52′ 23″
- Distance: 1,226 ly (376 pc)
- Apparent magnitude (V): 3.5
- Apparent dimensions (V): 60′

Physical characteristics
- Estimated age: 20 million years
- Other designations: Cr 140

Associations
- Constellation: Canis Major

Collinder 140 is a nearby open cluster of stars in the constellation Canis Major. It was first catalogued in 1751 by the French astronomer Nicolas Louis de Lacaille, who described it as a "nebulous star cluster". It was catalogued again by the Swedish astronomer Per Collinder in 1931. Fitzgerald et al. (1980) describe it as "a young extended cluster" and note that it is not obviously a cluster and may instead be a mere grouping of stars that formed together.

Based on the combined parallax measurements of nine cluster members, this cluster has an estimated parallax of 2.66 ± 0.13 mas, which is equivalent to a distance modulus of 7.88 ± 0.11, or a distance of 1,226 light-years (376 pc). The cluster has a density of 0.21 solar masses per cubic parsec; roughly double the density of stars near the Sun. It is about 20 million years old, and may have been created from the same interstellar cloud that formed NGC 2516 and NGC 2547.
