= NGC 2547 =

Open cluster in the constellation Vela

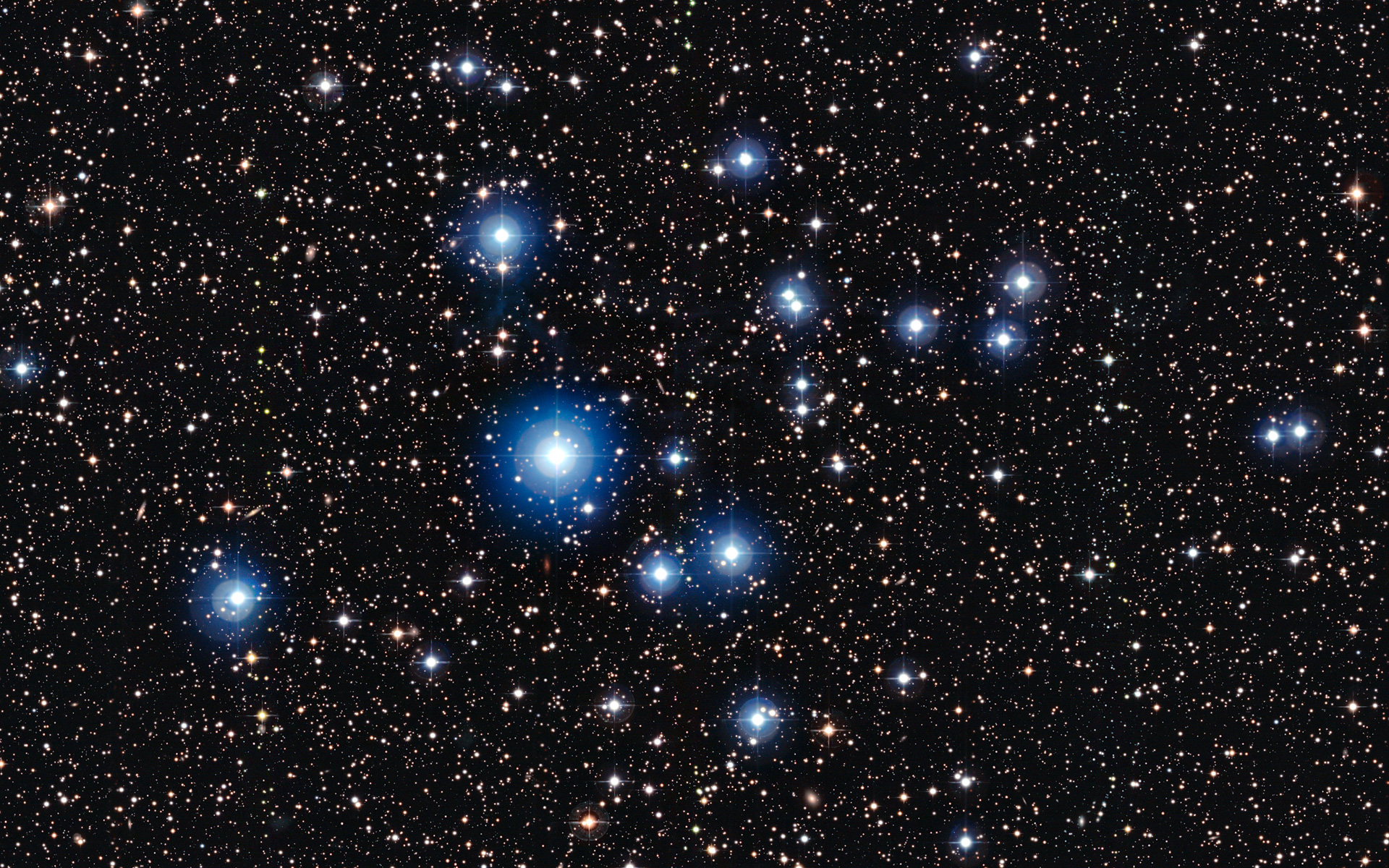
- This image from the Wide Field Imager on the MPG/ESO 2.2-metre telescope at ESO's La Silla Observatory in Chile, shows the bright open star cluster NGC 2547.

Observation data (J2000.0 epoch)
- Right ascension: 8^{h} 09^{m} 52.360^{s}
- Declination: −49° 10′ 35.01″
- Distance: 1.19 kly (364.0+46.8 −37.9 pc)
- Apparent magnitude (V): 4.7
- Apparent dimensions (V): 20′

Physical characteristics
- Mass: 201 M_{☉}
- Radius: 2.61 ly
- Estimated age: 37.7+5.7 −4.8 Myr
- Other designations: NGC 2547, Cr 177, Mel 84, Dunlop 410, Lacaille III.2

Associations
- Constellation: Vela

NGC 2547, also known as the Golden Earring Cluster or Malus Cluster, is a southern open cluster in Vela, discovered by Nicolas Louis de Lacaille in 1751 from South Africa. The star cluster is young with an age of 20-30 million years.

Observations with the Spitzer Space Telescope showed a shell around the B3 III/IV-type star HD 68478. This could be a sign of recent mass loss in this star.

A study using Gaia DR2 data showed that NGC 2547 formed about 30 million years ago together with a new discovered star cluster, called [BBJ2018] 6. The star cluster NGC 2547 has a similar age compared with Trumpler 10, NGC 2451B, Collinder 135 and Collinder 140. It was suggested that all these clusters formed in a single event of triggered star formation.

NGC 2547 shows evidence for mass segregation down to 3 M_{☉}.

== Cluster members with debris disks ==
Observations with the Spitzer Space Telescope have shown that ≤1% of the stars in NGC 2547 have infrared excess in 8.0 μm and 30-45% of the B- to F-type stars have infrared excess at 24 μm.

The system 2MASS J08090250-4858172, also called ID8 is located in NGC 2547 and showed substantial brightening of the debris disk at a wavelength of 3 to 5 micrometers, followed by a decay over a year. This was interpreted as a violent impact on a planetary body in this system.

NGC 2547 contains nine M-dwarfs with 24 μm excess. These could be debris disks and the material could be orbiting close to the snow line of these stars, indicating that planet-formation is underway in these systems. Later it was suggested that these M-dwarfs might contain Peter Pan Disks. 2MASS 08093547-4913033, which is one of the M-dwarfs with a debris disk in NGC 2547 was observed with the Spitzer Infrared Spectrograph. In this system the first detection of silicate was made from a debris disk around an M-type star.

== Gallery ==
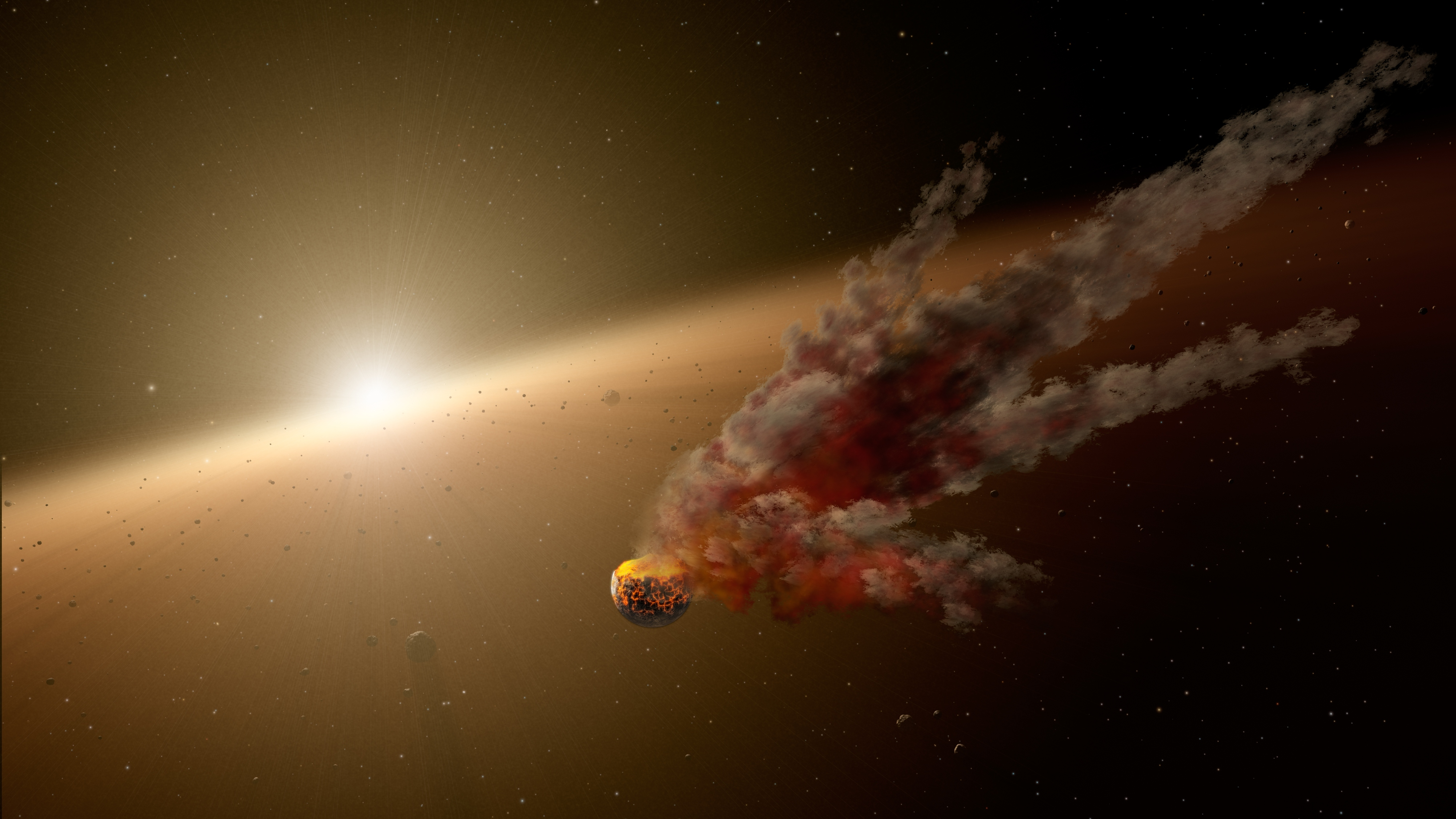
Asteroid collision - building planets near star NGC 2547-ID8 (artist concept)

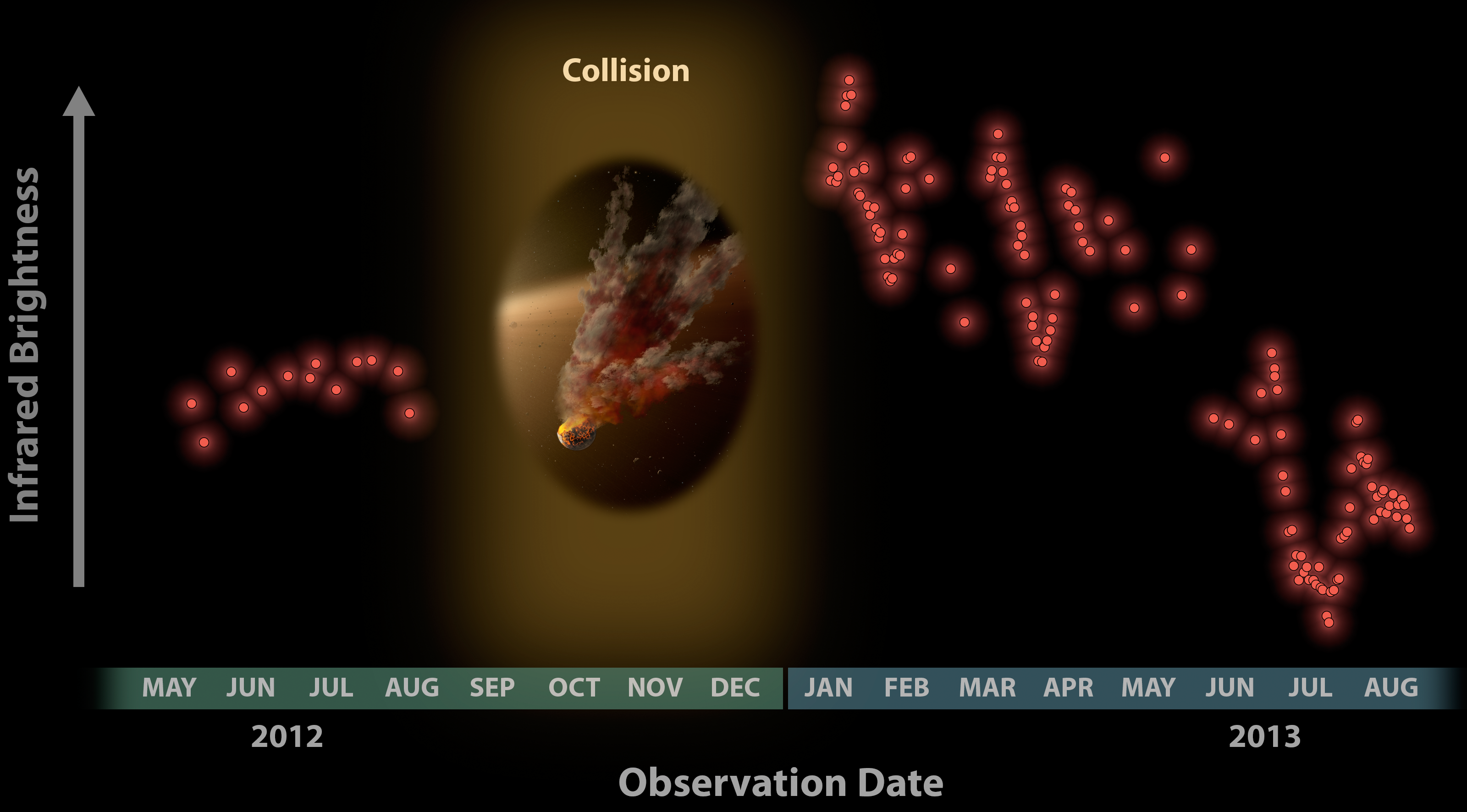
Plot of IR brightness over time suggesting a collision of asteroids near star NGC 2547-0ID8 (2012–2013)

Zooming into the open star cluster NGC 2547 (in HD)

Pan sequence in the open star cluster NGC 2547 (in HD)

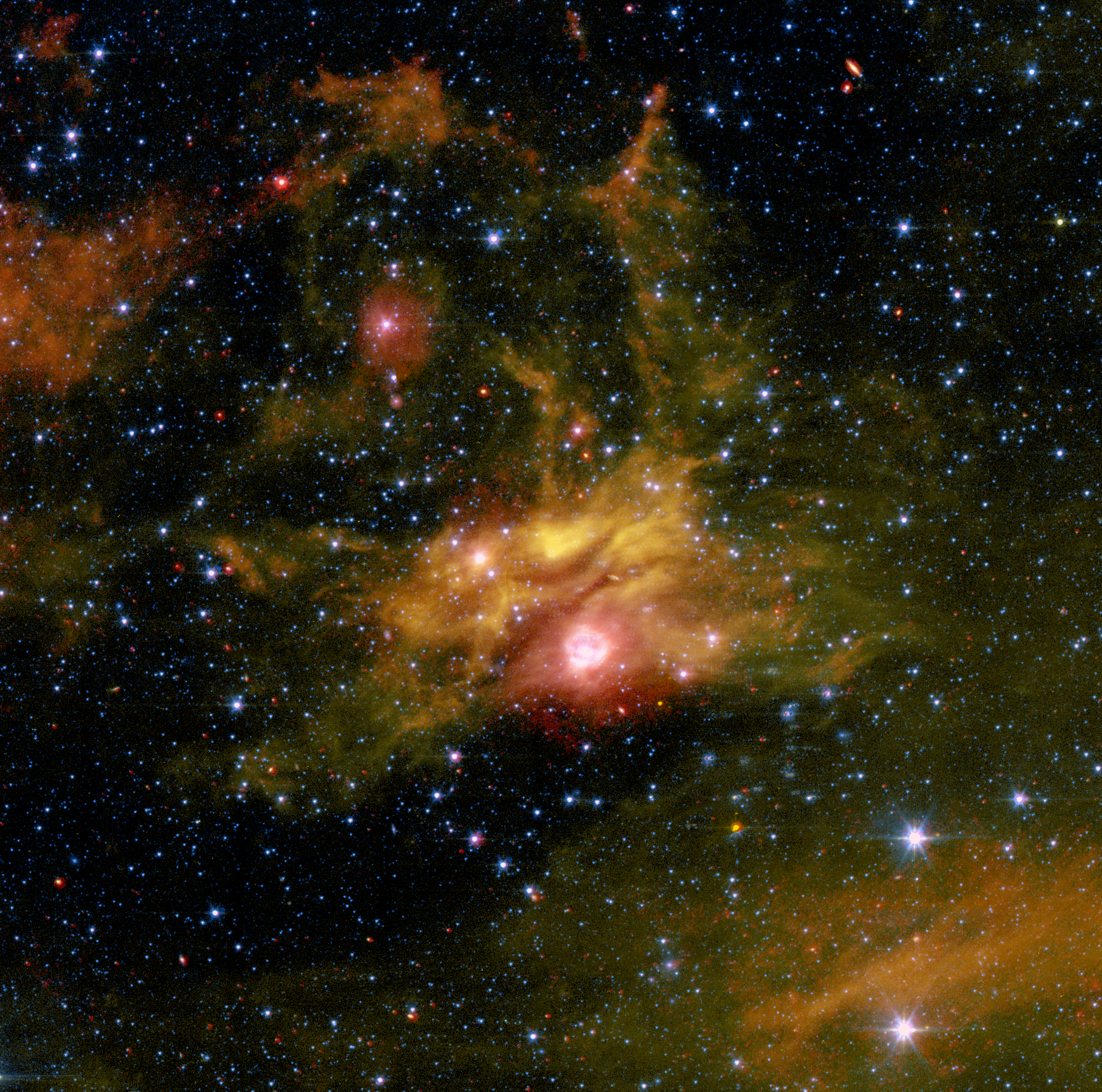
Infrared image of NGC 2547 taken with the Spitzer Space Telescope. Below the center HD 68478 and the shell around this star is seen.

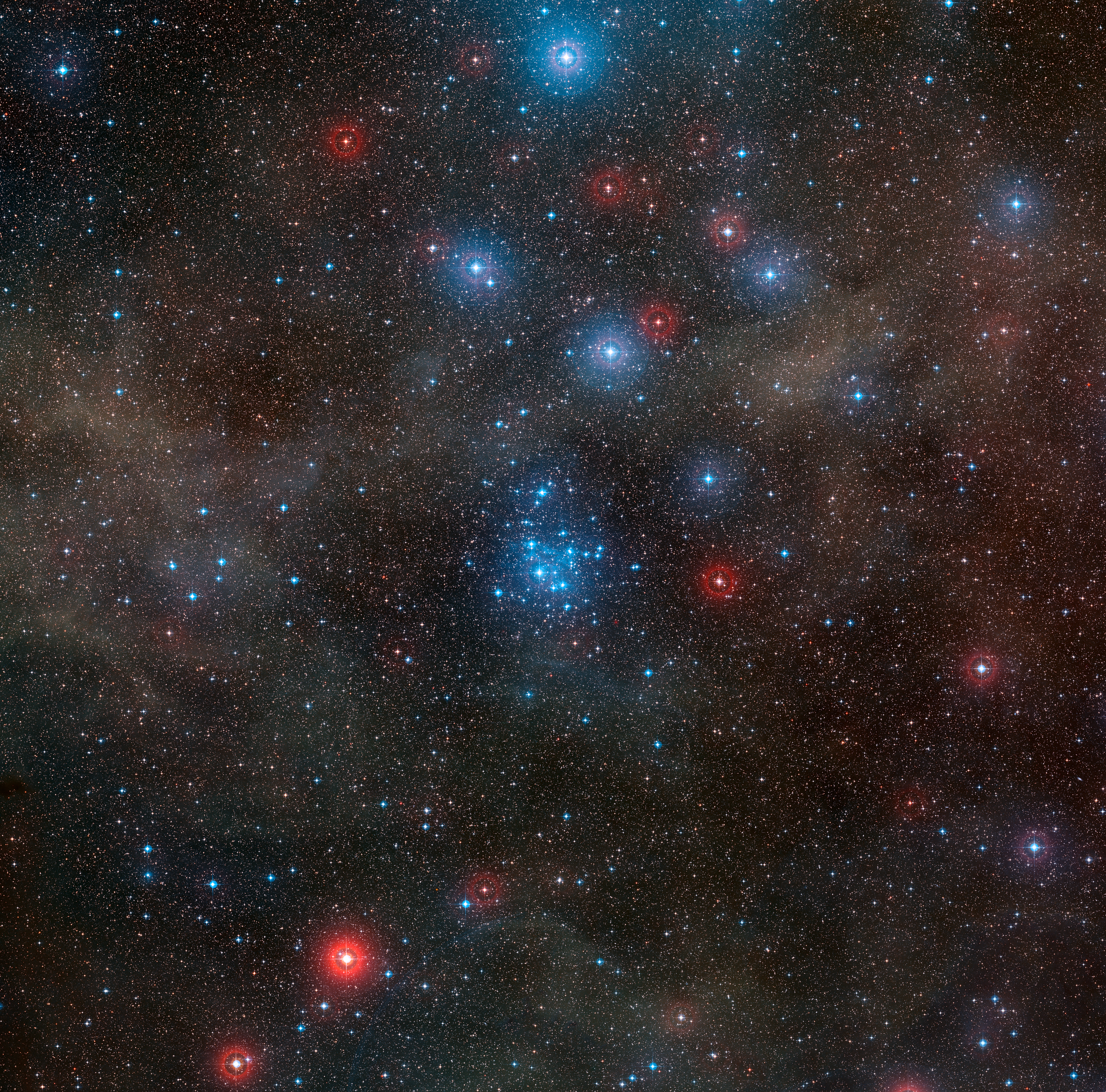
Wide-field view of NGC 2547, created from DSS2 images.
