= CG 4 =

Star-forming region in the constellation Puppis

Molecular cloud
- Bok globule
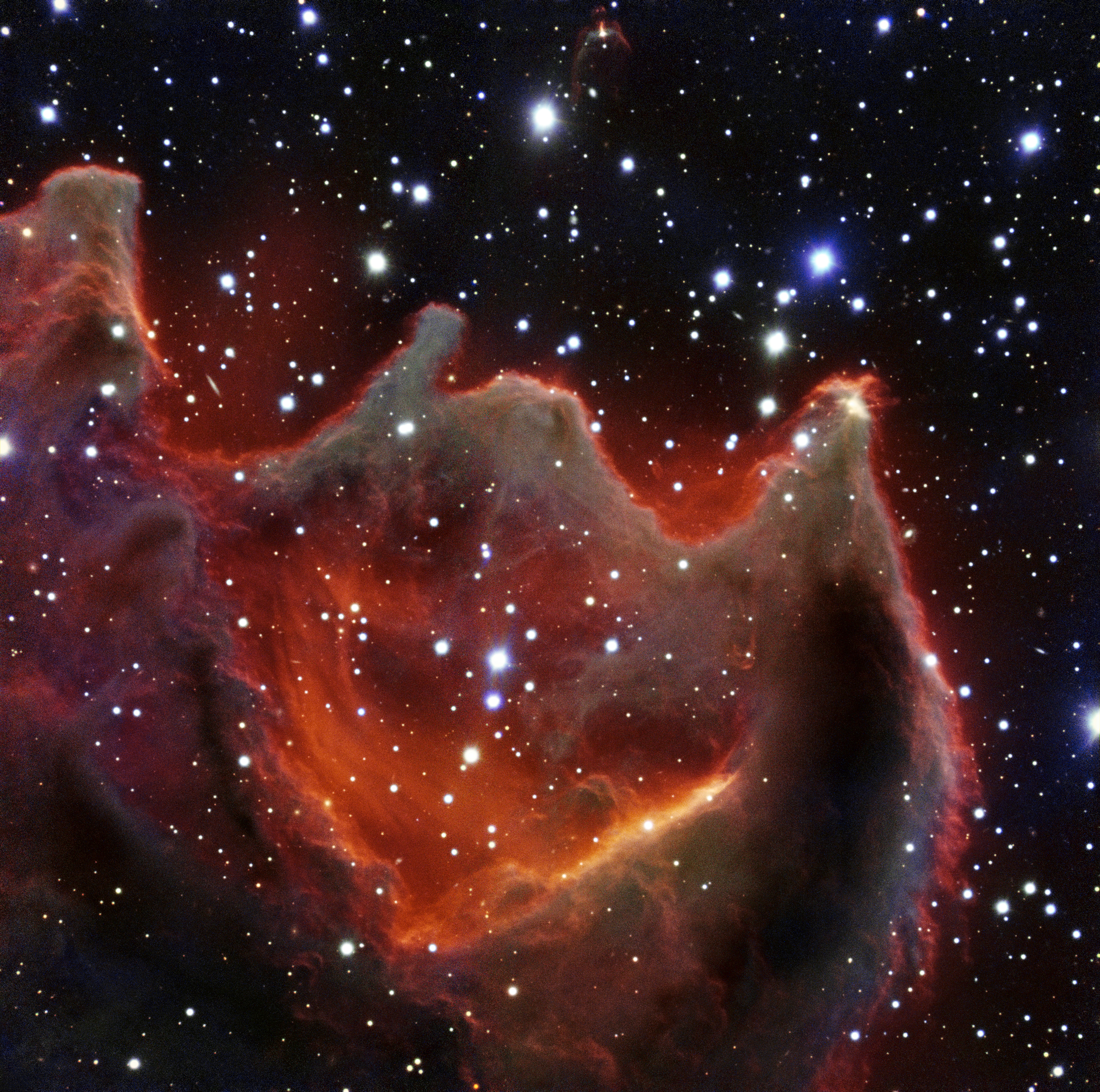
- Image of CG 4 taken by the European Southern Observatory's Very Large Telescope.

Observation data: J2000 epoch
- Right ascension: 07^{h} 34^{m} 09.0^{s}
- Declination: −46° 54′ 18″
- Distance: 1,300 ly (400 pc)
- Constellation: Puppis

Physical characteristics
- Dimensions: 1.5 × 8 ly (0.46 × 2.45 pc)
- Designations: BHR 21, DCld 259.4-12.7, FEST 2-30, Sandqvist 103

CG 4, commonly referred to as God's Hand, is a star-forming region located in the constellation Puppis, about 1,300 light-years (400 pc) from Earth. It is one of several objects referred to as "cometary globules", because its shape is similar to that of a comet. It has a dense head formed of gas and dust, which is around 1.5 ly (0.46 pc) in diameter, and an elongated faint tail around 8 ly (2.5 pc) in length.

CG 4, and the nearby cometary globules, generally point away from the Vela Supernova Remnant, located at the center of the Gum Nebula.

== Discovery ==
In 1976, photographs from the UK Schmidt Telescope—operated by the Australian Astronomical Observatory—showed several objects resembling comets, located in the Gum Nebula, an emission nebula of the constellation. Due to their particular shape, these objects came to be known as cometary globules. Each globule has a dense, dark, ruptured head and a very long tail, with the latter pointing away from the Vela Supernova Remnant. As a part of the ESO Cosmic Gems program, the European Southern Observatory released an image of CG 4 in January 2015 showing the head of the nebula.

== Structure ==
The head of cometary globule CG 4 resembles a comet with a dusty cavernous mouth, as photographed by the European Southern Observatory's Very Large Telescope in 2015. Composed of relatively dense, dark matter, it is an opaque structure that is being illuminated by the glow of a nearby star. An obscure red glow limbing the globule is possibly caused by emission from ionized hydrogen. The mouth of the globule appears to be ready to consume the edge-on spiral galaxy ESO 257-19. In reality, the galaxy is over a hundred million light-years further away from the globule.
