= Trumpler 10 =

Open star cluster in the constellation Vela

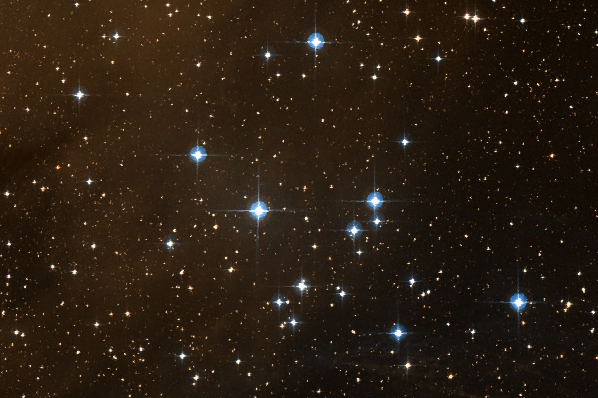

Observation data (J2000 epoch)
- Right ascension: 08^{h} 47^{m} 54^{s}
- Declination: −42° 29′ 27″
- Distance: 1,100 ly (337.25 pc)
- Apparent magnitude (V): 4.6

Physical characteristics
- Estimated age: 38-47 million years
- Other designations: Trumpler 10, Cr 203, C 0846-423, Dunlop 490

Associations
- Constellation: Vela

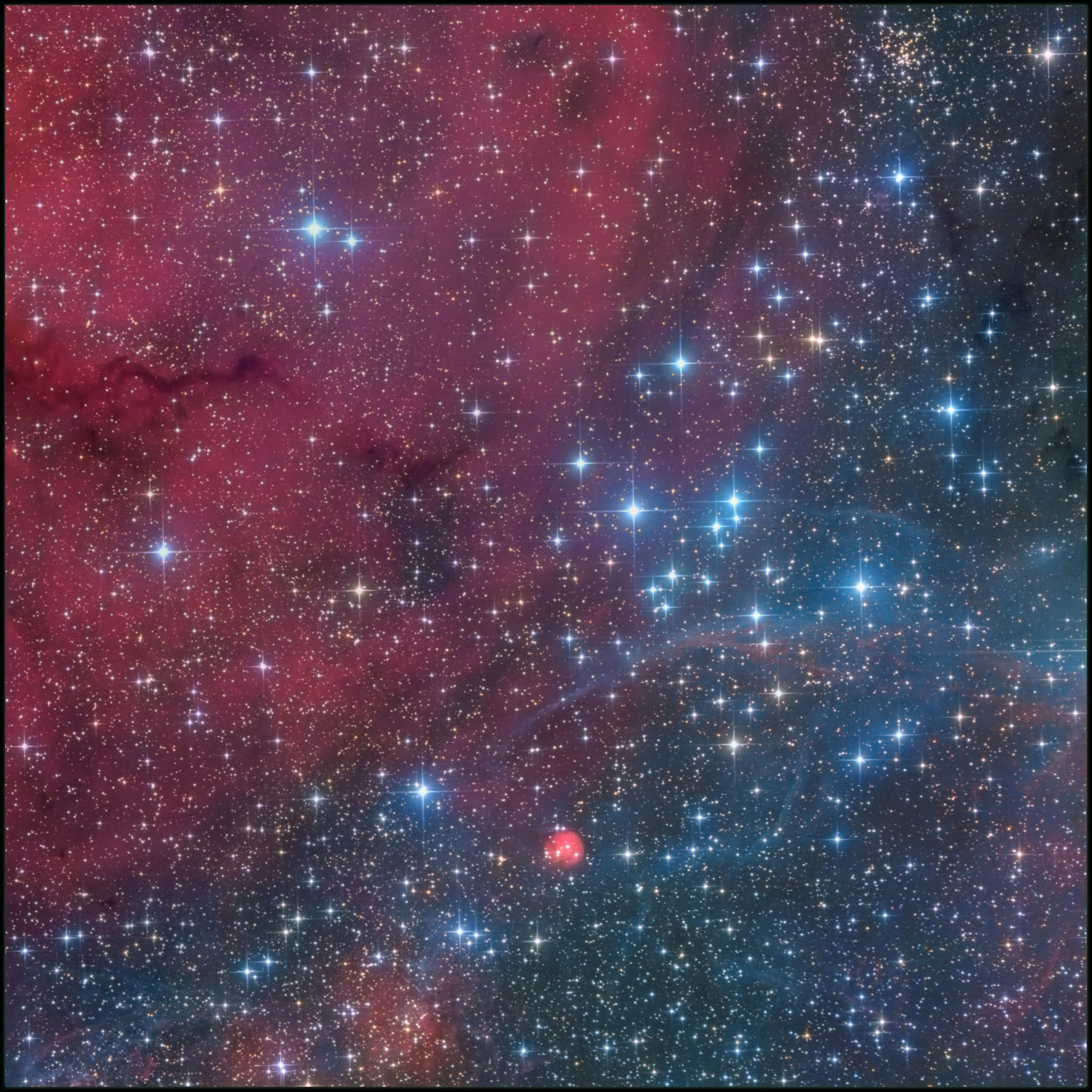
Open star cluster Trumpler 10 and its surroundings

Trumpler 10 (also known as C 0846-423) is an open cluster located in the constellation Vela. It was possibly discovered by Nicolas Louis de Lacaille in 1751-52, as the cluster's location data matches well with No. II.6 in his catalog. The cluster was also officially discovered by James Dunlop in 1826 and rediscovered independently by R.J. Trumpler in 1903.

A photometric investigation was performed in 1962 which studied 29 stars within the cluster and determined 19 additional possible members. In the study, a minimum age of 3×10^{7} (30 million) years and a distance of 420 parsecs were derived.
