= List of stars in Taurus =

These are the stars in the constellation Taurus, sorted by decreasing brightness:

Name	B	F	G.	Var	HD	HIP	RA	Dec	vis. mag.	abs. mag.	Dist. (ly)	Sp. class	Notes
Aldebaran	α	87			29139	21421	04^{h} 35^{m} 55.20^{s}	+16° 30′ 35.1″	0.87	−0.63	65	K5III	Cor Tauri, Parilicium; 13th-brightest star, variable
β Tau	β	112			35497	25428	05^{h} 26^{m} 17.50^{s}	+28° 36′ 28.3″	1.65	−1.37	131	B7III	El Nath, Alnath, Nath
Alcyone A	η	25			23630	17702	03^{h} 47^{m} 29.06^{s}	+24° 06′ 18.9″	2.85	−2.41	368	B7III	member of the Pleiades star cluster, binary star
ζ Tau	ζ	123			37202	26451	05^{h} 37^{m} 38.68^{s}	+21° 08′ 33.3″	2.97	−2.56	417	B4IIIp	Tianguan; γ Cas variable
θ^{2} Tau	θ^{2}	78			28319	20894	04^{h} 28^{m} 39.67^{s}	+15° 52′ 15.4″	3.40	0.10	149	A7III	Chamukuy, member of the Hyades star cluster; δ Sct variable
λ Tau	λ	35			25204	18724	04^{h} 00^{m} 40.82^{s}	+12° 29′ 25.4″	3.41	−1.87	370	B3V + A	Bibing, Sadr al Tauri, Pectus Tauri; eclipsing binary; Algol variable
ε Tau	ε	74			28305	20889	04^{h} 28^{m} 36.93^{s}	+19° 10′ 49.9″	3.53	0.15	155	K0III	Ain, Oculus Borealis; member of the Hyades star cluster; has a planet (b)
ο Tau	ο	1	3		21120	15900	03^{h} 24^{m} 48.84^{s}	+09° 01′ 44.6″	3.61	−0.45	211	G8III	
Atlas A		27			23850	17847	03^{h} 49^{m} 09.73^{s}	+24° 03′ 12.7″	3.62	−1.72	380	B8III	member of the Pleiades star cluster; triple star
γ Tau	γ	54			27371	20205	04^{h} 19^{m} 47.53^{s}	+15° 37′ 39.7″	3.65	0.28	154	G8III	Hyadum I, Prima Hyadum, Primus Hyadum; member of the Hyades star cluster
Electra		17			23302	17499	03^{h} 44^{m} 52.52^{s}	+24° 06′ 48.4″	3.72	−1.56	370	B6III	member of the Pleiades star cluster
ξ Tau	ξ	2	4		21364	16083	03^{h} 27^{m} 10.12^{s}	+09° 43′ 58.0″	3.73	−0.44	222	B9Vn	Ushakaron; eclipsing binary
δ^{1} Tau	δ^{1}	61			27697	20455	04^{h} 22^{m} 56.03^{s}	+17° 32′ 33.3″	3.77	0.41	153	G8III	Hyadum II, Secunda Hyadum, Secundus Hyadum; member of the Hyades star cluster
θ^{1} Tau	θ^{1}	77			28307	20885	04^{h} 28^{m} 34.43^{s}	+15° 57′ 44.0″	3.84	0.42	158	G7III	member of the Hyades star cluster
Maia		20			23408	17573	03^{h} 45^{m} 49.59^{s}	+24° 22′ 04.3″	3.87	−1.34	360	B8III	member of the Pleiades star cluster
ν Tau	ν	38	30		25490	18907	04^{h} 03^{m} 09.38^{s}	+05° 59′ 21.5″	3.91	0.92	129	A1V	
5 Tau	f	5			21754	16369	03^{h} 30^{m} 52.37^{s}	+12° 56′ 12.1″	4.14	−1.08	360	K0II-III...	
Merope		23		V971	23480	17608	03^{h} 46^{m} 19.56^{s}	+23° 56′ 54.5″	4.14	−1.07	359	B6IV	V971 Tau; member of the Pleiades star cluster; β Cep variable
κ^{1} Tau	κ^{1}	65			27934	20635	04^{h} 25^{m} 22.10^{s}	+22° 17′ 38.3″	4.21	0.85	153	A7IV-V	member of the Hyades star cluster; sextuple star
88 Tau	d	88	61		29140	21402	04^{h} 35^{m} 39.23^{s}	+10° 09′ 39.3″	4.25	0.93	150	A5m	
μ Tau	μ	49	44		26912	19860	04^{h} 15^{m} 32.05^{s}	+08° 53′ 32.7″	4.27	−1.35	435	B3IV	
90 Tau	c	90			29388	21589	04^{h} 38^{m} 09.40^{s}	+12° 30′ 39.1″	4.27	0.96	150	A6V	member of the Hyades star cluster
τ Tau	τ	94			29763	21881	04^{h} 42^{m} 14.70^{s}	+22° 57′ 25.1″	4.27	−1.18	400	B3V	Gaja
υ Tau	υ	69			28024	20711	04^{h} 26^{m} 18.39^{s}	+22° 48′ 49.3″	4.28	0.90	155	A8Vn	member of the Hyades star cluster; δ Sct variable
10 Tau		10	11		22484	16852	03^{h} 36^{m} 52.52^{s}	+00° 24′ 10.2″	4.29	3.60	45	F9V	
Taygeta	q	19			23338	17531	03^{h} 45^{m} 12.48^{s}	+24° 28′ 02.6″	4.30	−0.99	373	B6V	Taÿgete; member of the Pleiades star cluster
68 Tau	δ^{3}	68		V776	27962	20648	04^{h} 25^{m} 29.32^{s}	+17° 55′ 40.8″	4.30	1.02	148	A2IV	V776 Tau; member of the Hyades star cluster; α^{2} CVn variable
119 Tau		119		CE	36389	25945	05^{h} 32^{m} 12.75^{s}	+18° 35′ 39.3″	4.32	−4.53	1918	M2Ib	Ruby Star, CE Tau; semiregular variable
37 Tau	A^{1}	37			25604	19038	04^{h} 04^{m} 41.66^{s}	+22° 04′ 55.4″	4.36	0.64	181	K0III	Yuè (月)
71 Tau		71		V777	28052	20713	04^{h} 26^{m} 20.67^{s}	+15° 37′ 06.0″	4.48	1.08	156	F0V...	V777 Tau; member of the Hyades star cluster; spectroscopic binary; δ Sct variable
136 Tau		136			39357	27830	05^{h} 53^{m} 19.64^{s}	+27° 36′ 44.2″	4.56	−1.08	438	A0V	
ι Tau	ι	102			32301	23497	05^{h} 03^{m} 05.70^{s}	+21° 35′ 24.2″	4.62	1.13	163	A7V	member of the Hyades star cluster
ρ Tau	ρ	86			28910	21273	04^{h} 33^{m} 50.86^{s}	+14° 50′ 40.2″	4.65	1.30	152	A8V	member of the Hyades star cluster; δ Sct variable
σ^{2} Tau	σ^{2}	92			29488	21683	04^{h} 39^{m} 16.45^{s}	+15° 55′ 04.9″	4.67	1.23	159	A5Vn	Fùěr (附耳), member of the Hyades star cluster
π Tau	π	73			28100	20732	04^{h} 26^{m} 36.38^{s}	+14° 42′ 49.9″	4.69	−1.03	455	G8III	
HD 28527					28527	21029	04^{h} 30^{m} 33.57^{s}	+16° 11′ 38.7″	4.78	1.54	145	A6IV	member of the Hyades star cluster
64 Tau	δ^{2}	64			27819	20542	04^{h} 24^{m} 05.69^{s}	+17° 26′ 39.2″	4.80	1.55	146	A7V	member of the Hyades star cluster
139 Tau		139			40111	28237	05^{h} 57^{m} 59.66^{s}	+25° 57′ 14.1″	4.81	−4.24	2103	B1Ib	
47 Tau		47	42		26722	19740	04^{h} 13^{m} 56.39^{s}	+09° 15′ 50.0″	4.84	−0.44	371	G5III	
126 Tau		126			37711	26777	05^{h} 41^{m} 17.72^{s}	+16° 32′ 03.1″	4.84	−1.96	748	B3IV...	
114 Tau	o	114			35708	25539	05^{h} 27^{m} 38.08^{s}	+21° 56′ 13.1″	4.88	−1.76	695	B2.5IV	
132 Tau		132			38751	27468	05^{h} 49^{m} 00.96^{s}	+24° 34′ 03.2″	4.88	−1.14	522	G8IIIvar	
134 Tau		134			38899	27511	05^{h} 49^{m} 32.94^{s}	+12° 39′ 04.9″	4.89	0.29	272	B9IV	
104 Tau	m	104			32923	23835	05^{h} 07^{m} 26.68^{s}	+18° 38′ 42.0″	4.91	3.91	52	G4V	
ω^{2} Tau	ω^{2}	50			27045	19990	04^{h} 17^{m} 15.69^{s}	+20° 34′ 43.5″	4.93	2.64	93	A3m	
75 Tau		75			28292	20877	04^{h} 28^{m} 26.37^{s}	+16° 21′ 34.7″	4.96	1.08	194	K2IIIvar	Shakata
109 Tau	n	109			34559	24822	05^{h} 19^{m} 16.59^{s}	+22° 05′ 48.1″	4.96	0.96	206	G8III	
φ Tau	φ	52			27382	20250	04^{h} 20^{m} 21.23^{s}	+27° 21′ 03.4″	4.97	−0.13	342	K1III	
111 Tau		111		V1119	35296	25278	05^{h} 24^{m} 25.31^{s}	+17° 23′ 00.8″	5.00	4.17	48	F8V SB	V1119 Tau; BY Draconis variable
79 Tau	b	79			28355	20901	04^{h} 28^{m} 50.10^{s}	+13° 02′ 51.5″	5.02	1.56	160	A7V	member of the Hyades star cluster
Pleione		28		BU	23862	17851	03^{h} 49^{m} 11.20^{s}	+24° 08′ 12.6″	5.05	−0.32	387	B7p	BU Tau; member of the Pleiades star cluster; γ Cas variable
30 Tau	e	30			23793	17771	03^{h} 48^{m} 16.25^{s}	+11° 08′ 36.1″	5.08	−1.11	565	B3V	
σ^{1} Tau	σ^{1}	91			29479	21673	04^{h} 39^{m} 09.20^{s}	+15° 48′ 00.1″	5.08	1.74	152	A4m	member of the Hyades star cluster
97 Tau	i	97		V480	30780	22565	04^{h} 51^{m} 22.41^{s}	+18° 50′ 23.8″	5.08	1.27	189	A7IV-V	Lembu, V480 Tau; member of the Hyades star cluster; δ Sct variable
66 Tau	r	66	50		27820	20522	04^{h} 23^{m} 51.84^{s}	+09° 27′ 39.5″	5.10	−0.32	396	A3V	
4 Tau	s	4			21686	16322	03^{h} 30^{m} 24.48^{s}	+11° 20′ 11.3″	5.14	−0.39	417	A0Vn	
41 Tau		41		GS	25823	19171	04^{h} 06^{m} 36.40^{s}	+27° 36′ 00.1″	5.18	−0.72	494	B9p Si	GS Tau; α² CVn variable
125 Tau		125			37438	26640	05^{h} 39^{m} 44.19^{s}	+25° 53′ 49.7″	5.18	−0.73	495	B3IV	
ψ Tau	ψ	42			25867	19205	04^{h} 07^{m} 00.52^{s}	+29° 00′ 04.6″	5.21	3.01	90	F1V	
43 G. Tau			43		26793	19799	04^{h} 14^{m} 36.24^{s}	+10° 00′ 41.2″	5.22	−0.59	474	B9Vn	
					23985	17954	03^{h} 50^{m} 18.91^{s}	+25° 34′ 46.7″	5.24	1.39	192	A2V	
58 Tau		58		V696	27459	20261	04^{h} 20^{m} 36.24^{s}	+15° 05′ 43.8″	5.26	1.89	154	F0V	V696 Tau; member of the Hyades star cluster; δ Sct variable
κ^{2} Tau	κ^{2}	67			27946	20641	04^{h} 25^{m} 24.94^{s}	+22° 12′ 00.4″	5.27	2.05	144	A7V	member of the Hyades star cluster
l Tau	l	106			32977	23871	05^{h} 07^{m} 48.43^{s}	+20° 25′ 06.4″	5.28	1.65	173	A5V	
133 Tau		133			38622	27364	05^{h} 47^{m} 42.90^{s}	+13° 53′ 58.7″	5.28	−1.67	799	B2IV-V	
46 Tau		46	41		26690	19719	04^{h} 13^{m} 33.11^{s}	+07° 42′ 57.7″	5.29	2.45	121	F3V...	Solar sibling candidate
40 Tau		40	32	V1133	25558	18957	04^{h} 03^{m} 44.60^{s}	+05° 26′ 08.3″	5.32	−2.21	1045	B3V	V1133 Tau
49 Eri		(49)	62		29335	21515	04^{h} 37^{m} 13.68^{s}	+00° 59′ 54.0″	5.32	−1.75	847	B7V	
29 Tau	u	29	17		23466	17563	03^{h} 45^{m} 40.43^{s}	+06° 03′ 00.1″	5.34	−0.94	588	B3V	
56 Tau		56		V724	27309	20186	04^{h} 19^{m} 36.69^{s}	+21° 46′ 24.9″	5.34	0.41	316	A0p Si	V724 Tau; α² CVn variable
34 G. Tau			34		25621	18993	04^{h} 04^{m} 09.79^{s}	+02° 49′ 38.1″	5.36	2.66	113	F6IV	
121 Tau		121			36819	26248	05^{h} 35^{m} 27.12^{s}	+24° 02′ 22.7″	5.37	−0.95	599	B2.5IV	
χ Tau	χ	59			27638	20430	04^{h} 22^{m} 34.93^{s}	+25° 37′ 45.7″	5.38	0.81	267	B9V	
63 G. Tau			63		29499	21670	04^{h} 39^{m} 06.10^{s}	+07° 52′ 15.6″	5.38	1.82	168	A5m	member of the Hyades star cluster
44 Tau	p	44		IM	26322	19513	04^{h} 10^{m} 49.88^{s}	+26° 28′ 51.7″	5.39	1.51	195	F2IV-V	IM Tau; δ Sct variable
83 Tau		83			28556	21036	04^{h} 30^{m} 37.30^{s}	+13° 43′ 28.0″	5.40	2.10	149	F0V	member of the Hyades star cluster
115 Tau		115			35671	25499	05^{h} 27^{m} 10.09^{s}	+17° 57′ 44.2″	5.40	−1.16	668	B5V	
					23753	17776	03^{h} 48^{m} 20.80^{s}	+23° 25′ 16.9″	5.44	0.36	338	B8V	
Celaeno		16			23288	17489	03^{h} 44^{m} 48.20^{s}	+24° 17′ 22.5″	5.45	0.40	334	B7IV	member of the Pleiades star cluster
33 G. Tau			33		25570	18975	04^{h} 03^{m} 56.51^{s}	+08° 11′ 49.9″	5.45	2.67	117	F2V	member of the Hyades star cluster
93 Tau		93			29589	21735	04^{h} 40^{m} 03.42^{s}	+12° 11′ 51.5″	5.45	0.33	345	B8IV	
36 Tau		36			25555	19009	04^{h} 04^{m} 21.67^{s}	+24° 06′ 21.7″	5.46	−1.87	953	G0III...	
81 Tau		81			28546	21039	04^{h} 30^{m} 38.83^{s}	+15° 41′ 31.0″	5.47	2.24	145	Am	member of the Hyades star cluster
118 Tau		118			35943	25695	05^{h} 29^{m} 16.49^{s}	+25° 09′ 01.1″	5.47	−0.15	434	B9Vn	
130 Tau		130			38558	27338	05^{h} 47^{m} 26.20^{s}	+17° 43′ 44.9″	5.47	−2.48	1268	F0III	
53 Tau		53		V1024	27295	20171	04^{h} 19^{m} 26.08^{s}	+21° 08′ 32.7″	5.50	0.93	267	B9IV	V1024 Tau; α² CVn variable; on 29 May 2032, it will be occulted by Venus but in daylight and with Venus too close to the Sun
103 Tau		103			32990	23900	05^{h} 08^{m} 06.62^{s}	+24° 15′ 54.7″	5.50	−4.48	3228	B2V...	
					36408	25950	05^{h} 32^{m} 14.14^{s}	+17° 03′ 29.4″	5.50	−2.17	1116	B7III	
ω^{1} Tau	ω^{1}	43			26162	19388	04^{h} 09^{m} 09.90^{s}	+19° 36′ 33.5″	5.51	0.76	291	K2III	
					31539	23043	04^{h} 57^{m} 22.35^{s}	+17° 09′ 13.3″	5.51	−0.29	472	K1III	
116 Tau		116			35770	25555	05^{h} 27^{m} 45.61^{s}	+15° 52′ 26.8″	5.52	−0.67	565	B9.5Vn	
72 Tau		72			28149	20789	04^{h} 27^{m} 17.45^{s}	+22° 59′ 46.9″	5.53	0.01	415	B7V	
44 Eri		(44)	54		28375	20884	04^{h} 28^{m} 32.11^{s}	+01° 22′ 51.1″	5.53	0.17	385	B3V	
122 Tau		122			37147	26382	05^{h} 37^{m} 03.71^{s}	+17° 02′ 25.5″	5.53	1.87	176	F0V	member of the Hyades star cluster
135 Tau		135			39019	27581	05^{h} 50^{m} 28.90^{s}	+14° 18′ 20.5″	5.54	0.63	312	G9III:	
12 Tau		12	13		22796	17103	03^{h} 39^{m} 51.14^{s}	+03° 03′ 24.6″	5.55	0.10	400	G6III:	
57 Tau	h	57		V483	27397	20219	04^{h} 19^{m} 57.63^{s}	+14° 02′ 06.9″	5.58	2.32	146	F3V...	V483 Tau; member of the Hyades star cluster; δ Sct variable
80 Tau		80			28485	20995	04^{h} 30^{m} 08.53^{s}	+15° 38′ 16.4″	5.58	2.38	142	F0V...	member of the Hyades star cluster
					39004	27629	05^{h} 50^{m} 58.11^{s}	+27° 58′ 04.2″	5.60	0.29	376	G7III:	
137 Tau		137		V809	39317	27743	05^{h} 52^{m} 22.30^{s}	+14° 10′ 18.5″	5.60	−0.39	515	B9p...	V809 Tau; α² CVn variable
32 Tau		32			24740	18471	03^{h} 56^{m} 52.03^{s}	+22° 28′ 41.7″	5.62	2.36	146	F2IV	
51 Tau		51			27176	20087	04^{h} 18^{m} 23.14^{s}	+21° 34′ 45.8″	5.64	1.95	179	F0V	member of the Hyades star cluster
63 Tau		63			27749	20484	04^{h} 23^{m} 25.00^{s}	+16° 46′ 38.4″	5.64	2.27	154	A1m	member of the Hyades star cluster
18 Tau		18			23324	17527	03^{h} 45^{m} 09.73^{s}	+24° 50′ 21.7″	5.66	0.40	368	B8V	
31 Tau		31	21		24263	18089	03^{h} 52^{m} 00.22^{s}	+06° 32′ 05.7″	5.66	−1.01	704	B5V	
26 G. Tau			26		25330	18805	04^{h} 01^{m} 46.13^{s}	+09° 59′ 52.9″	5.67	−0.52	565	B5V	
60 G. Tau			60		28978	21295	04^{h} 34^{m} 08.28^{s}	+05° 34′ 07.1″	5.67	0.18	408	A2Vs	
120 Tau		120		V960	36576	26064	05^{h} 33^{m} 31.63^{s}	+18° 32′ 24.8″	5.67	−3.13	1874	B2IV-Ve	V960 Tau; Be star
13 Tau		13			23016	17309	03^{h} 42^{m} 18.94^{s}	+19° 42′ 01.0″	5.68	0.19	409	B9Vn	
45 Tau		45	38		26462	19554	04^{h} 11^{m} 20.20^{s}	+05° 31′ 22.9″	5.71	2.78	126	F4V	member of the Hyades star cluster
60 Tau		60		V775	27628	20400	04^{h} 22^{m} 03.45^{s}	+14° 04′ 38.1″	5.72	2.42	149	A3m	V775 Tau; member of the Hyades star cluster; spectroscopic binary; δ Sct variable
					28226	20842	04^{h} 28^{m} 00.72^{s}	+21° 37′ 12.0″	5.72	2.32	156	Am	member of the Hyades star cluster
131 Tau		131			38545	27316	05^{h} 47^{m} 13.15^{s}	+14° 29′ 18.3″	5.72	0.16	422	A3Vn	
					29646	21819	04^{h} 41^{m} 19.74^{s}	+28° 36′ 54.2″	5.73	0.67	335	A2V	
6 Tau	t	6	8		21933	16511	03^{h} 32^{m} 35.93^{s}	+09° 22′ 24.8″	5.76	0.57	355	B9IV	
Sterope I		21			23432	17579	03^{h} 45^{m} 54.46^{s}	+24° 33′ 16.6″	5.76	0.39	387	B8V	Asterope; member of the Pleiades star cluster
49 G. Tau			49		27497	20268	04^{h} 20^{m} 41.25^{s}	+06° 07′ 51.3″	5.76	0.17	428	G8III-IV	
117 Tau		117			35802	25583	05^{h} 28^{m} 01.60^{s}	+17° 14′ 21.3″	5.77	−0.90	704	M1III	
89 Tau		89			29375	21588	04^{h} 38^{m} 09.38^{s}	+16° 02′ 00.2″	5.78	2.49	148	F0V	member of the Hyades star cluster
99 Tau		99			31553	23068	04^{h} 57^{m} 48.65^{s}	+23° 56′ 54.9″	5.79	−0.01	471	G8III:	
98 Tau	k	98			31592	23088	04^{h} 58^{m} 09.38^{s}	+25° 03′ 01.9″	5.79	1.00	296	A0V	
V711 Tau			10	V711	22468	16846	03^{h} 36^{m} 47.31^{s}	+00° 35′ 17.4″	5.82	3.51	94	G5IV/V +K1IV	RS CVn variable
					37098	26396	05^{h} 37^{m} 08.84^{s}	+26° 55′ 28.3″	5.83	0.00	477	B9IV-V	
105 Tau		105		V1155	32991	23883	05^{h} 07^{m} 55.43^{s}	+21° 42′ 17.4″	5.84	−1.66	1032	B2Ve	V1155 Tau; Be star; on 7 April 2032, it will be occulted by Saturn over New Zealand, the Pacific Ocean, the NW half of North America, Greenland
HU Tau				HU	29365	21604	04^{h} 38^{m} 15.84^{s}	+20° 41′ 05.1″	5.85	0.63	361	B8V	Algol variable
					28217	20804	04^{h} 27^{m} 28.77^{s}	+11° 12′ 44.4″	5.87	0.00	487	B8IV	
					28929	21323	04^{h} 34^{m} 37.99^{s}	+28° 57′ 40.3″	5.88	0.11	466	B9p...	
					25202	18735	04^{h} 00^{m} 48.69^{s}	+18° 11′ 38.6″	5.89	2.60	148	F4V...	member of the Hyades star cluster
					26038	19284	04^{h} 07^{m} 59.41^{s}	+17° 20′ 23.7″	5.89	0.77	345	K5III	
39 Tau	A^{2}	39			25680	19076	04^{h} 05^{m} 20.15^{s}	+22° 00′ 33.2″	5.90	4.78	55	G5V	
76 Tau		76			28294	20873	04^{h} 28^{m} 23.34^{s}	+14° 44′ 27.7″	5.90	2.23	177	F0IV	member of the Hyades star cluster
18 G. Tau			18		23526	17595	03^{h} 46^{m} 09.36^{s}	+06° 48′ 13.2″	5.91	0.84	337	G9III	
					27639	20417	04^{h} 22^{m} 22.73^{s}	+20° 49′ 17.1″	5.91	−2.74	1753	M0III	
6 G. Tau			6		21755	16358	03^{h} 30^{m} 45.40^{s}	+06° 11′ 19.5″	5.93	−0.07	517	G8III	
V1156 Tau				V1156	33204	24019	05^{h} 09^{m} 45.06^{s}	+28° 01′ 50.2″	5.93	2.24	178	A5m	member of the Hyades star cluster
					26171	19376	04^{h} 09^{m} 01.56^{s}	+13° 23′ 53.9″	5.94	0.26	445	B9.5V	
7 Tau		7			22091	16664	03^{h} 34^{m} 26.62^{s}	+24° 27′ 52.1″	5.95	−0.06	519	A3V	
					24357	18170	03^{h} 53^{m} 09.96^{s}	+17° 19′ 37.8″	5.97	2.88	135	F4V	member of the Hyades star cluster
					27901	20614	04^{h} 24^{m} 57.06^{s}	+19° 02′ 31.5″	5.97	2.52	160	F4V	member of the Hyades star cluster
					30912	22697	04^{h} 52^{m} 47.09^{s}	+27° 53′ 51.3″	5.97	0.81	352	F2IV	
					30197	22176	04^{h} 46^{m} 16.78^{s}	+18° 44′ 05.5″	5.99	1.16	302	K4III	
V1141 Tau				V1141	27742	20493	04^{h} 23^{m} 32.36^{s}	+20° 58′ 55.7″	6.00	0.15	482	B8IV-V	
129 Tau		129			38478	27265	05^{h} 46^{m} 45.49^{s}	+15° 49′ 21.0″	6.00	−1.15	879	B8IIIMNp...	
85 Tau		85			28677	21137	04^{h} 31^{m} 51.69^{s}	+15° 51′ 05.9″	6.01	2.75	147	F4V...	member of the Hyades star cluster
59 G. Tau			59		28930	21269	04^{h} 33^{m} 48.18^{s}	+09° 24′ 49.0″	6.01	0.21	470	G8III	
V1116 Tau				V1116	29169	21459	04^{h} 36^{m} 29.07^{s}	+23° 20′ 27.5″	6.01	2.78	144	F5IV	δ Sct variable; member of the Hyades star cluster
					26015	19261	04^{h} 07^{m} 41.91^{s}	+15° 09′ 46.2″	6.02	2.66	153	F3V	member of the Hyades star cluster
					21051	15850	03^{h} 24^{m} 10.11^{s}	+12° 37′ 46.7″	6.03	0.27	462	K0III-IV	
					38670	27421	05^{h} 48^{m} 22.36^{s}	+20° 52′ 10.3″	6.03	−0.28	595	B9Vn	
					39970	28154	05^{h} 56^{m} 56.12^{s}	+24° 14′ 58.9″	6.03			A0Ia	
					23950	17921	03^{h} 49^{m} 55.06^{s}	+22° 14′ 39.3″	6.05	1.08	321	B8III	
33 Tau		33		V817	24769	18485	03^{h} 57^{m} 03.80^{s}	+23° 10′ 32.1″	6.05	−0.01	531	B9.5IV	V817 Tau
V1143 Tau			51	V1143	28114	20715	04^{h} 26^{m} 21.10^{s}	+08° 35′ 25.0″	6.06	−0.25	597	B6IV	β Cep variable
					23258	17453	03^{h} 44^{m} 28.19^{s}	+20° 55′ 43.6″	6.09	1.72	243	A0V	
24 G. Tau			24		24817	18481	03^{h} 57^{m} 01.70^{s}	+06° 02′ 24.5″	6.09	1.70	246	A2Vn	
					26546	19641	04^{h} 12^{m} 31.32^{s}	+17° 16′ 39.0″	6.09	1.38	285	K0III	
96 Tau		96			30605	22441	04^{h} 49^{m} 44.08^{s}	+15° 54′ 15.3″	6.09	−2.09	1411	K3III	
110 Tau		110			35189	25216	05^{h} 23^{m} 37.72^{s}	+16° 41′ 57.7″	6.09	0.41	445	A2IV	
11 Tau		11			22805	17181	03^{h} 40^{m} 46.30^{s}	+25° 19′ 46.3″	6.11	0.09	522	A2IV	
					27429	20255	04^{h} 20^{m} 25.04^{s}	+18° 44′ 33.8″	6.11	2.73	154	F3:V...	member of the Hyades star cluster
14 G. Tau			14		22819	17120	03^{h} 39^{m} 59.55^{s}	−01° 07′ 16.4″	6.12	0.56	421	G5	
					34579	24820	05^{h} 19^{m} 14.71^{s}	+20° 08′ 04.8″	6.12	0.51	431	G8III+...	
14 Tau		14			23183	17408	03^{h} 43^{m} 47.14^{s}	+19° 39′ 54.6″	6.13	0.99	347	G8III	
					22072	16641	03^{h} 34^{m} 08.32^{s}	+17° 50′ 00.9″	6.14	3.00	138	K1IVe...	
V1137 Tau				V1137	26571	19672	04^{h} 12^{m} 51.25^{s}	+22° 24′ 48.5″	6.14	−1.36	1032	B9IIIsp...	α² CVn variable
53 G. Tau			53		28322	20848	04^{h} 28^{m} 03.62^{s}	+01° 51′ 30.9″	6.14	0.99	349	G9III	
					27483	20284	04^{h} 20^{m} 52.66^{s}	+13° 51′ 52.1″	6.15	2.84	150	F6V...	member of the Hyades star cluster
					23923	17900	03^{h} 49^{m} 43.52^{s}	+23° 42′ 43.1″	6.17	0.84	380	B8V	
					22695	17058	03^{h} 39^{m} 25.73^{s}	+16° 32′ 12.4″	6.18	0.72	403	K0III	
95 Tau		95			29859	21961	04^{h} 43^{m} 13.75^{s}	+24° 05′ 20.3″	6.18	2.69	163	F7IV-V	
					24802	18508	03^{h} 57^{m} 26.39^{s}	+24° 27′ 43.0″	6.19	−1.40	1072	K0	
					36589	26072	05^{h} 33^{m} 38.84^{s}	+20° 28′ 27.2″	6.19	−0.76	799	B6V	
					32482	23589	05^{h} 04^{m} 21.58^{s}	+21° 16′ 40.8″	6.20	−0.18	615	K0	
					34810	24977	05^{h} 20^{m} 56.62^{s}	+19° 48′ 51.7″	6.20	−0.21	625	K0III	
					29459	21689	04^{h} 39^{m} 23.14^{s}	+25° 13′ 05.9″	6.21	0.97	363	A5Vn	
52 G. Tau			52		28191	20771	04^{h} 27^{m} 00.66^{s}	+02° 04′ 46.4″	6.23	0.81	395	K1III	
113 Tau		113			35532	25410	05^{h} 26^{m} 05.72^{s}	+16° 42′ 00.6″	6.23	−0.28	655	B2Vn	
V731 Tau				V731	37967	26964	05^{h} 43^{m} 19.50^{s}	+23° 12′ 15.9″	6.23	−1.41	1098	B2.5Ve	γ Cas variable; Be star
40 G. Tau			40		26676	19720	04^{h} 13^{m} 34.55^{s}	+10° 12′ 45.1″	6.24	0.30	502	B8Vn	
					28867	21251	04^{h} 33^{m} 33.04^{s}	+18° 01′ 00.3″	6.24	0.68	423	B9IVn	
					26703	19736	04^{h} 13^{m} 49.83^{s}	+12° 45′ 13.5″	6.25	1.04	359	K0	
108 Tau		108			34053	24512	05^{h} 15^{m} 27.66^{s}	+22° 17′ 05.5″	6.26	−0.26	657	A2V	
					36859	26291	05^{h} 35^{m} 55.52^{s}	+27° 39′ 44.7″	6.27	−0.68	799	K0	
24 Tau		24			23629		03^{h} 47^{m} 20.90^{s}	+24° 06′ 58.0″	6.28			A0V	
84 Tau		84		V1146	28595	21082	04^{h} 31^{m} 07.16^{s}	+15° 06′ 18.6″	6.28	0.55	455	M3III	V1146 Tau
					21379	16095	03^{h} 27^{m} 18.67^{s}	+12° 44′ 07.1″	6.29	1.20	340	A0Vs	
					36160	25806	05^{h} 30^{m} 43.32^{s}	+22° 27′ 44.3″	6.29	0.87	395	K0	
V766 Tau				V766	24155	18033	03^{h} 51^{m} 15.86^{s}	+13° 02′ 46.1″	6.30	0.63	443	B9p Si	α² CVn variable
					25175	18717	04^{h} 00^{m} 36.89^{s}	+17° 17′ 48.2″	6.31	−0.95	924	A0V	
48 Tau		48		V1099	26911	19877	04^{h} 15^{m} 46.21^{s}	+15° 24′ 02.7″	6.31	3.07	145	F5Vvar	V1099 Tau; member of the Hyades star cluster
47 G. Tau			47		27386	20188	04^{h} 19^{m} 37.43^{s}	+10° 07′ 17.5″	6.31	0.05	583	K0	
V774 Tau			45	V774	26923	19859	04^{h} 15^{m} 28.86^{s}	+06° 11′ 13.6″	6.32	4.69	69	G0IV...	BY Draconis variable
					29104	21408	04^{h} 35^{m} 42.57^{s}	+19° 52′ 54.6″	6.33	0.56	464	G5II-III+...	
					31362	22949	04^{h} 56^{m} 15.59^{s}	+24° 35′ 32.1″	6.33	3.15	141	F0	
62 Tau		62			27778	20533	04^{h} 23^{m} 59.76^{s}	+24° 18′ 03.7″	6.34	−0.40	726	B3V	
					30122	22128	04^{h} 45^{m} 42.46^{s}	+23° 37′ 40.9″	6.34	−0.33	704	B5III	
					24368	18201	03^{h} 53^{m} 34.46^{s}	+25° 40′ 58.7″	6.35	0.52	478	A2V	
25 G. Tau			25		25102	18658	03^{h} 59^{m} 40.41^{s}	+10° 19′ 49.5″	6.35	3.38	128	F5V	member of the Hyades star cluster
					34762	24984	05^{h} 20^{m} 59.34^{s}	+27° 57′ 26.3″	6.35	−0.29	695	B9IV	
					37784	26853	05^{h} 42^{m} 03.99^{s}	+22° 39′ 37.4″	6.35	1.14	359	K2	
					31236	22850	04^{h} 54^{m} 58.32^{s}	+19° 29′ 07.6″	6.36	2.19	222	F3IV	member of the Hyades star cluster
1 G. Tau			1		21018	15807	03^{h} 23^{m} 38.99^{s}	+04° 52′ 55.6″	6.37	−1.30	1116	G5III	
					28086	20698	04^{h} 26^{m} 01.34^{s}	+04° 22′ 24.6″	6.37	−0.06	631	K0	
58 G. Tau			58		28736	21152	04^{h} 32^{m} 04.74^{s}	+05° 24′ 36.1″	6.37	3.19	141	F5V	member of the Hyades star cluster
					28271	20904	04^{h} 28^{m} 51.98^{s}	+30° 21′ 41.5″	6.38	2.71	177	F7V	
					22522	16924	03^{h} 37^{m} 47.82^{s}	+15° 25′ 50.2″	6.40	2.05	241	A5IV	
5 G. Tau			5		21585	16226	03^{h} 29^{m} 03.80^{s}	+03° 14′ 55.3″	6.41	0.68	455	G5	
					27860	20558	04^{h} 24^{m} 14.47^{s}	+12° 09′ 28.9″	6.42	−0.28	713	K0	
					37439	26616	05^{h} 39^{m} 27.11^{s}	+21° 45′ 46.8″	6.42	−0.11	660	A1Vn	
Sterope II		22			23441	17588	03^{h} 46^{m} 02.89^{s}	+24° 31′ 40.8″	6.43	1.25	354	A0Vn	Asterope; member of the Pleiades star cluster
					23712	17759	03^{h} 48^{m} 06.56^{s}	+24° 59′ 18.5″	6.44	−0.33	738	K5	
70 Tau		70			27991	20661	04^{h} 25^{m} 37.25^{s}	+15° 56′ 27.9″	6.44	3.10	152	F7V	member of the Hyades star cluster
					37329	26571	05^{h} 38^{m} 57.36^{s}	+26° 37′ 05.1″	6.45	0.87	426	G9III	
2 G. Tau			2		21032	15800	03^{h} 23^{m} 36.31^{s}	+00° 54′ 37.1″	6.47	1.20	369	K0	
26 Tau		26			23822	17832	03^{h} 48^{m} 56.91^{s}	+23° 51′ 26.2″	6.47	2.11	243	F0	
55 G. Tau			55		28505	20985	04^{h} 30^{m} 02.30^{s}	+10° 15′ 44.7″	6.47	1.22	365	G8III	
					38263	27116	05^{h} 45^{m} 01.30^{s}	+12° 53′ 18.1″	6.47	1.33	348	A3	
					32642	23695	05^{h} 05^{m} 32.11^{s}	+19° 48′ 24.3″	6.48	0.71	464	A5m	
					38524	27353	05^{h} 47^{m} 34.66^{s}	+25° 34′ 07.1″	6.48	−0.95	997	K1III	
9 G. Tau			9		22211	16695	03^{h} 34^{m} 49.10^{s}	+06° 25′ 03.8″	6.49	0.84	439	G0	
37 G. Tau			37		26292	19434	04^{h} 09^{m} 43.04^{s}	+03° 19′ 22.2″	6.49	2.51	204	F2	
SZ Tau				SZ	29260	21517	04^{h} 37^{m} 14.78^{s}	+18° 32′ 35.0″	6.49	−1.04	1045	F5Ib	δ Cep variable
Y Tau					38307	27181	05^{h} 45^{m} 39.41^{s}	+20° 41′ 41.1″	6.5	−1.1	2170	C6.5	carbon star
					22615	17026	03^{h} 39^{m} 00.06^{s}	+20° 54′ 57.1″	6.50	0.60	494	Am...	
					28568	21053	04^{h} 30^{m} 46.74^{s}	+16° 08′ 55.5″	6.50	3.43	134	F5V	member of the Hyades star cluster
9 Tau		9			22374	16859	03^{h} 36^{m} 58.03^{s}	+23° 12′ 40.0″	6.72	1.08	437	A2p	
101 Tau		101			31845	23214	04^{h} 59^{m} 44.27^{s}	+15° 55′ 00.5″	6.75	3.57	141	F5V	member of the Hyades star cluster
HD 24496					24496	18267	03^{h} 54^{m} 28.03^{s}	+16° 36′ 57.8″	6.81	3.36	160	G5	binary star
55 Tau		55			27383	20215	04^{h} 19^{m} 54.78^{s}	+16° 31′ 21.6″	6.85	3.68	140	F7V+...	member of the Hyades star cluster
HD 24040					24040	17960	03^{h} 50^{m} 22.97^{s}	+17° 28′ 34.9″	7.52	4.18	152	G0	has a planet (b)
HD 32963					32963	26381	05^{h} 07^{m} 56.0^{s}	+26° 19′ 41″	7.6			G5IV	has a planet (b)
HD 37124					37124	23884	05^{h} 37^{m} 02.49^{s}	+20° 43′ 50.8″	7.68	5.07	108	G4V	has three planets (b, c & d)
Alcyone B	η				23607		03^{h} 47^{m} 19.20^{s}	+24° 08′ 22.0″	8.30				component of the Alcyone system
HD 28678					28678	21109	04^{h} 31^{m} 25 ^{s}	+04° 34′ 31″	8.54		740	K0D	Hoggar, has a planet (b)
RV Tauri				RV	283868		04^{h} 47^{m} 06.73^{s}	+26° 10′ 45.6″	9.41		~20000	K3pv	prototype of the RV Tauri-type variables; V_{max} = 9.8^{m}, V_{min} = 13.3^{m}
HD 283668					283668	20834	04^{h} 27^{m} 53.0^{s}	+24° 26′ 41″	9.44		138		has a planet (b)
T Tauri				T	284419	20390	04^{h} 21^{m} 59.43^{s}	+19° 32′ 06.4″	9.60	3.36	576	G5Ve	prototype of the T Tauri-type variables
HD 284149					284149	19176	04^{h} 06^{m} 39.0^{s}	+20° 18′ 11″	9.63		353	F8	has a planet (b)
HD 286123					286123		04^{h} 55^{m} 04.0^{s}	+18° 39′ 16″	9.8		434	F9V	has a planet (b)
Gliese 176					285968	21932	04^{h} 42^{m} 55.78^{s}	+18° 57′ 29.4″	9.97	10.10	31	M2.5V	has a planet (b)
HD 285507					285507	19207	04^{h} 07^{m} 01.0^{s}	+15° 20′ 06″	10.5		135	K5	has a planet (b)
HD 283869					283869	22271	04^{h} 47^{m} 42.0^{s}	+26° 09′ 00″	10.6		155		has a planet (b)
K2-136							04^{h} 29^{m} 38.99^{s}	+22° 52′ 57.8″	11.20		192	K5V	member of the Hyades star cluster; has three transiting planets (b, c, d)
V830 Tau							04^{h} 33^{m} 10.0^{s}	+24° 33′ 43″	12.1		427	M0	has a planet (b)
WASP-152							04^{h} 10^{m} 41.0^{s}	+24° 24′ 07″	12.56		603	G7V	has a transiting planet (b)
CL Tau				CL			04^{h} 38^{m} 45.0^{s}	+08° 05′ 46″	13			T Tau	has a planet (b)
CI Tau				CI			04^{h} 33^{m} 52.0^{s}	+22° 50′ 30″	13			K4IV	has a planet (b)
FW Tau				FW			04^{h} 29^{m} 30.0^{s}	+26° 16′ 53″	15.5		473	M4	has a planet (b)
Crab Pulsar							05^{h} 34^{m} 31.95^{s}	+22° 00′ 52.1″	16.5		6500	F	Baade's Star; PSR B0531+21, CM Tau; pulsar in the Crab Nebula
2M J044144							04^{h} 41^{m} 44.90^{s}	+23° 01′ 51.4″			455	M8.5	has a planet
Table legend: • Name = Proper name • B = Bayer designation • F or/and G. = Flamsteed designation or Gould designation • Var = Variable-star designation • HD = Henry Draper Catalogue designation number • HIP = Hipparcos Catalogue designation number • RA = Right ascension for the Epoch/Equinox J2000.0 • Dec = Declination for the Epoch/Equinox J2000.0 • vis. mag. = visual magnitude (m or m_{v}), also known as apparent magnitude • abs. mag. = absolute magnitude (M_{v}) • Dist. (ly) = Distance in light-years from Earth • Sp. class = Spectral class of the star in the stellar classification system • Notes = Common name(s) or alternate name(s); comments; notable properties [for example: multiple star status, range of variability if it is a variable star, exoplanets, etc.]

== See also ==
- List of stars by constellation
