= Sigma Tauri =

Sigma Tauri (σ Tauri) is a visual double star in the zodiac constellation of Taurus. Its two physically unrelated components are:

- σ^{1} Tauri
- σ^{2} Tauri

The latter is the more northerly star. The two are separated by 7.2 arcminutes on the sky and can be readily split with a pair of binoculars.
