= Omega Tauri =

The Bayer designation Omega Tauri (ω Tau, ω Tauri) is shared by two star systems, ω^{1} Tauri and ω^{2} Tauri, in the constellation Taurus. They are separated by 2.13° on the sky.

- ω^{1} Tauri
- ω^{2} Tauri
