= 134 Tauri =

Star in the constellation Taurus

- Location of 134 Tauri (circled in red)

Observation data Epoch J2000 Equinox J2000
- Constellation: Taurus
- Right ascension: 05^{h} 49^{m} 32.92974^{s}
- Declination: +12° 39′ 04.7582″
- Apparent magnitude (V): 4.89

Characteristics
- Evolutionary stage: main sequence
- Spectral type: B9 IV
- B−V color index: −0.068±0.004

Astrometry
| Radial velocity (R_{v}) | +20.5±0.1 km/s |
| Proper motion (μ) | RA: −22.98 mas/yr Dec.: −18.22 mas/yr |
| Parallax (π) | 13.11±0.33 mas |
| Distance | 249 ± 6 ly (76 ± 2 pc) |
| Absolute magnitude (M_{V}) | +0.48 |

Details
| Mass | 2.99 M_{☉} |
| Radius | 2.82 R_{☉} |
| Luminosity | 88 L_{☉} |
| Surface gravity (log g) | 3.97 cgs |
| Temperature | 10,520 K |
| Rotational velocity (v sin i) | 26 km/s |
| Age | 248 Myr |

Other designations
- 134 Tau, BD+12°912, HD 38899, HIP 27511, HR 2010, SAO 94888, WDS J05495+1239A

Database references
| SIMBAD | data |

134 Tauri is a single star in the zodiac constellation of Taurus. Its apparent magnitude is 4.89, which is bright enough to be faintly visible to the naked eye. The distance to this star, based upon an annual parallax shift of 13.11±0.33 mas, is around 249 light years. The star is moving further from the Sun with a heliocentric radial velocity of +20.5 km/s, having made its closest approach some three million years ago at a distance of 107 ly (32.7 pc).

This is an MK-standard star with a stellar classification of B9 IV, matching a subgiant star that is evolving away from the main sequence having exhausted the hydrogen at its core. It has a low projected rotational velocity of 26 km/s. The star is about 248 million years old with three times the mass of the Sun and approximately 2.8 times the Sun's radius. It is radiating around 88 times the Sun's luminosity from its photosphere at an effective temperature of about 10,520 K.
