= 114 Tauri =

Star in the constellation Taurus

- Location of 114 Tauri (circled in red)

Observation data Epoch J2000 Equinox J2000
- Constellation: Taurus
- Right ascension: 05^{h} 27^{m} 38.08406^{s}
- Declination: +21° 56′ 13.0738″
- Apparent magnitude (V): 4.88

Characteristics
- Spectral type: B2.5 IV or B2.5 V
- B−V color index: −0.14

Astrometry
Radial velocity (R_{v})	16.5±0.1 km/s
Proper motion (μ)	RA: +0.05 mas/yr Dec.: −7.06 mas/yr
Parallax (π)	5.22±0.21 mas
Distance	620 ± 30 ly (192 ± 8 pc)
Absolute magnitude (M_{V})	−1.58

Details
Mass	7.3±0.3 M_{☉}
Radius	3.9±0.4 R_{☉}
Luminosity	2,454+497 −365 L_{☉}
Surface gravity (log g)	4.15±0.07 cgs
Temperature	20,700±200 K
Rotational velocity (v sin i)	10 km/s
Age	22.0±3.1 Myr

Other designations
- o Tau, 114 Tau, BD+21°847, HD 35708, HIP 25539, HR 1810, SAO 77184, WDS J05276+2156A

Database references
SIMBAD	data

114 Tauri, or o Tauri, is a single, blue-white hued star in the zodiac constellation of Taurus. It is a faint star but visible to the naked eye with an apparent visual magnitude of 4.88. The distance to this star, as determined from its annual parallax shift of 5.22±0.21 mas, is roughly 620 light years. It is moving further from the Sun with a heliocentric radial velocity of 16.5 km/s, having come as close as 240 ly (75 pc) some 9.6 million years ago. It is a member of the Cas-Tau OB association of co-moving stars, and has a peculiar velocity of 8.3 km/s.

Grenier et al. (1999) assigned this star to a stellar classification of B2.5 IV, which matches the luminosity class of an evolving subgiant star. Abt (2008) listed it as a B-type main-sequence star with a class of B2.5 V. With an age of about 22 million years, 114 Tauri has an estimated 7 times the mass of the Sun and four times the Sun's radius. The star is radiating about 2,454 times the Sun's luminosity from its photosphere at an effective temperature of around 20,700 K. It appears to have a relatively low rotation rate for a star of its mass and age, showing a projected rotational velocity of 10 km/s.
