= 5 Tauri =

Binary star system in the constellation Taurus

- Location of 5 Tauri (circled in red)

Observation data Epoch J2000 Equinox ICRS
- Constellation: Taurus
- Right ascension: 03^{h} 30^{m} 52.38296^{s}
- Declination: +12° 56′ 12.0489″
- Apparent magnitude (V): +4.14

Characteristics
- Spectral type: K0-III
- U−B color index: +0.95
- B−V color index: +1.09

Astrometry
Radial velocity (R_{v})	14.2±0.3 km/s
Proper motion (μ)	RA: 13.537 mas/yr Dec.: -2.037 mas/yr
Parallax (π)	6.1081±0.3907 mas
Distance	530 ± 30 ly (160 ± 10 pc)
Absolute magnitude (M_{V})	−0.96

Orbit
Primary	5 Tauri A
Name	5 Tauri B
Period (P)	960 days
Semi-major axis (a)	4.25 mas
Eccentricity (e)	0.397±0.016
Inclination (i)	36.95°
Longitude of the node (Ω)	207.61°
Periastron epoch (T)	2,414,889.565±5.82
Argument of periastron (ω) (secondary)	326.32±2.99°
Semi-amplitude (K_{1}) (primary)	8.25±0.15 km/s

Details

5 Tauri A
Mass	4.0±0.7 M_{☉}
Radius	8.5 R_{☉}
Luminosity	329.38 L_{☉}
Surface gravity (log g)	1.97 cgs
Temperature	4,644 K
Metallicity [Fe/H]	0.05 dex
Rotational velocity (v sin i)	10 km/s

5 Tauri B
Mass	1.13±0.13 M_{☉}

Other designations
- f Tau, 5 Tau, BD+12°486, FK5 125, GC 4184, HD 21754, HIP 16369, HR 1066, SAO 93469, TYC 656-1725-1

Database references
SIMBAD	data

5 Tauri is a binary star in the zodiac constellation of Taurus, located approximately 530 light years from the Sun. It is visible to the naked eye as a faint orange-hued star with an apparent visual magnitude of +4.14. It is moving further from the Earth with a heliocentric radial velocity of +14 km/s.

This is a spectroscopic binary with a period of 960 days and an eccentricity of about 0.4. The primary component is a K-type giant with a stellar classification of K0-III. It has four times the mass of the Sun and is radiating 329 times the Sun's luminosity from its photosphere at an effective temperature of 4,644 K.
