= 66 Tauri =

Star in the constellation Taurus

Observation data Epoch J2000 Equinox ICRS
- Constellation: Taurus
- Right ascension: 04^{h} 23^{m} 51.82553^{s}
- Declination: +09° 27′ 39.4939″
- Apparent magnitude (V): 5.098 (5.8 / 5.9)

Characteristics
- Spectral type: A3V + A4V
- U−B color index: +0.10
- B−V color index: +0.07

Astrometry
| Radial velocity (R_{v}) | −8.70±1 km/s |
| Proper motion (μ) | RA: −20.32 mas/yr Dec.: −5.32 mas/yr |
| Parallax (π) | 8.24±0.31 mas |
| Distance | 400 ± 10 ly (121 ± 5 pc) |
| Absolute magnitude (M_{V}) | −0.32 |

Orbit
| Period (P) | 54.77 yr |
| Semi-major axis (a) | 0.188″ |
| Eccentricity (e) | 0.720 |
| Inclination (i) | 34.2° |
| Longitude of the node (Ω) | 239.8° |
| Periastron epoch (T) | 1937.24 |
| Argument of periastron (ω) (secondary) | 332.0° |

Details

66 Tau A
| Mass | 2.89 (Note: Cvetkovic et al. gives two possible mass sums: 2.89 / 2.76 M_{☉} or 2.88 / 2.77 M_{☉}.) M_{☉} |
| Rotational velocity (v sin i) | 81 km/s |

66 Tau B
| Mass | 2.76 M_{☉} |

Other designations
- r Tau, BD+09°570, HD 27820, HIP 20522, HR 1381, SAO 111791

Database references
| SIMBAD | data |

66 Tauri, also known as r Tauri, is a binary star in the constellation of Taurus. The combined apparent magnitude of the system is 5.098, with the magnitudes of the two components being 5.8 and 5.9, respectively. Parallax measurements by Hipparcos put 66 Tauri at some 400 light-years (121 parsecs) away.

This is a visual binary where the positions of the two stars are tracked over time, and used to calculate an orbit. The two stars orbit each other every 55 years. Their orbit is fairly eccentric, at 0.720, and the two stars are separated by 0.188″ on average. Both stars are A-type main-sequence stars with similar masses.
