= Pi Tauri =

Star in the constellation Taurus

- Location of π Tauri (circled in red)

Observation data Epoch J2000.0 Equinox J2000.0 (ICRS)
- Constellation: Taurus
- Right ascension: 04^{h} 26^{m} 36.37093^{s}
- Declination: +14° 42′ 49.6126″
- Apparent magnitude (V): +4.69

Characteristics
- Evolutionary stage: horizontal branch
- Spectral type: G7 IIIa Fe-1
- U−B color index: +0.72
- B−V color index: +0.98

Astrometry
| Radial velocity (R_{v}) | +31.4±0.3 km/s |
| Proper motion (μ) | RA: −9.52 mas/yr Dec.: −31.44 mas/yr |
| Parallax (π) | 7.83±0.22 mas |
| Distance | 420 ± 10 ly (128 ± 4 pc) |
| Absolute magnitude (M_{V}) | −0.84 |

Details
| Mass | 4.4 M_{☉} |
| Radius | 22 R_{☉} |
| Luminosity | 244 L_{☉} |
| Surface gravity (log g) | 2.39 cgs |
| Metallicity [Fe/H] | −0.08 dex |
| Rotational velocity (v sin i) | 7.1 km/s |
| Age | 554 Myr |

Other designations
- π Tau, 73 Tau, BD+14°697, HD 28100, HIP 20732, HR 1396, SAO 93935

Database references
| SIMBAD | data |

Pi Tauri (π Tauri) is a solitary, yellow-hued star in the zodiac constellation of Taurus. With an apparent visual magnitude of +4.69, it is bright enough to be visible to the naked eye. Although it appears to lie among the stars of the Hyades cluster, it is not itself a member, being three times farther from Earth than the cluster. The distance to this star, as determined using an annual parallax shift of 7.83 mas as seen from the Earth, is around 420 light years. At that range, the visual magnitude of the star is diminished by extinction of 0.24 magnitudes due to interstellar dust.

This is an evolved G-type giant star with a stellar classification of G7 IIIa Fe-1, where the suffix notation indicates an underabundance of iron in the spectrum. The measured angular diameter is 1.55±0.06 mas. At the estimated distance of Pi Tauri, this yields a physical size of about 22 times the radius of the Sun. It possesses 4.4 times the mass of the Sun and is radiating 244 times the Sun's luminosity at an effective temperature of 5006 K.
