= 32 Tauri =

Yellow-white hued subgiant star in the constellation Taurus

- Location of 32 Tauri (circled)

Observation data Epoch J2000.0 Equinox ICRS
- Constellation: Taurus
- Right ascension: 03^{h} 56^{m} 52.077^{s}
- Declination: +22° 28′ 40.70″
- Apparent magnitude (V): 5.62

Characteristics
- Evolutionary stage: main sequence
- Spectral type: F2IVs
- U−B color index: +0.00
- B−V color index: +0.345±0.004

Astrometry
Radial velocity (R_{v})	+31.90 km/s
Proper motion (μ)	RA: +70.674 mas/yr Dec.: −114.026 mas/yr
Parallax (π)	22.5957±0.0385 mas
Distance	144.3 ± 0.2 ly (44.26 ± 0.08 pc)
Absolute magnitude (M_{V})	2.42

Details
Mass	2.04 M_{☉}
Radius	2.75 R_{☉}
Luminosity	15.4 L_{☉}
Surface gravity (log g)	3.87 cgs
Temperature	6.901 K
Metallicity [Fe/H]	−0.19 dex
Rotational velocity (v sin i)	19.7 km/s
Age	2.1 Gyr

Other designations
- BD+22°605, FK5 2283, HD 24740, HIP 18471, HR 1218, SAO 76339

Database references
SIMBAD	data

32 Tauri is the Flamsteed designation for a solitary star in the zodiac constellation of Taurus. It has a visual magnitude of 5.64, making it visible to the naked eye from suburban skies (according to the Bortle scale). The position of this star near the ecliptic plane means that it is subject to occultations by the Moon. Parallax measurements put it at a distance of 144 light years from the Sun. It is drifting further away with a radial velocity of +31.9 km/s, having come to within 88.9 light-years some 759,000 years ago.

The spectrum of this star matches a stellar classification of F2IVs, with the luminosity class of IV indicating that this star has reached the subgiant stage and is in the process of evolving into a giant star. It has twice the mass of the sun with nearly three times the Sun's radius, but 15 times the Sun's luminosity and about half the Sun's age. The abundance of elements other than hydrogen and helium is lower in this star than in the Sun. The effective temperature of the star's outer atmosphere is 6901 K, giving it the white-hued glow of an F-type star.
