= Y Tauri =

Variable star in the constellation Taurus

- Location of Y Tauri (circled)

Observation data Epoch J2000 Equinox ICRS
- Constellation: Taurus
- Right ascension: 05^{h} 45^{m} 39.4101^{s}
- Declination: +20° 41′ 42.149″
- Apparent magnitude (V): 6.5 - 9.2

Characteristics
- Evolutionary stage: AGB
- Spectral type: C6.5,4e(N3)
- Variable type: SRb

Astrometry
| Radial velocity (R_{v}) | 17.00 km/s |
| Proper motion (μ) | RA: 0.039 mas/yr Dec.: −4.532 mas/yr |
| Parallax (π) | 1.5006±0.0592 mas |
| Distance | 2,170 ± 90 ly (670 ± 30 pc) |
| Absolute magnitude (M_{V}) | −1.1 (near max.) |

Details
| Mass | 4.3 M_{☉} |
| Radius | 219 R_{☉} |
| Luminosity | 6,025 L_{☉} |
| Surface gravity (log g) | 0.228 cgs |
| Temperature | 3,217 K |
| Metallicity [Fe/H] | −0.106 dex |

Other designations
- Y Tau, BD+20°1083, HD 38307, HIP 27181, HR 1977

Database references
| SIMBAD | data |

Y Tauri is a carbon star located in the constellation Taurus. Parallax measurements by Gaia put it at a distance of approximately 2,170 light-years (670 parsecs).

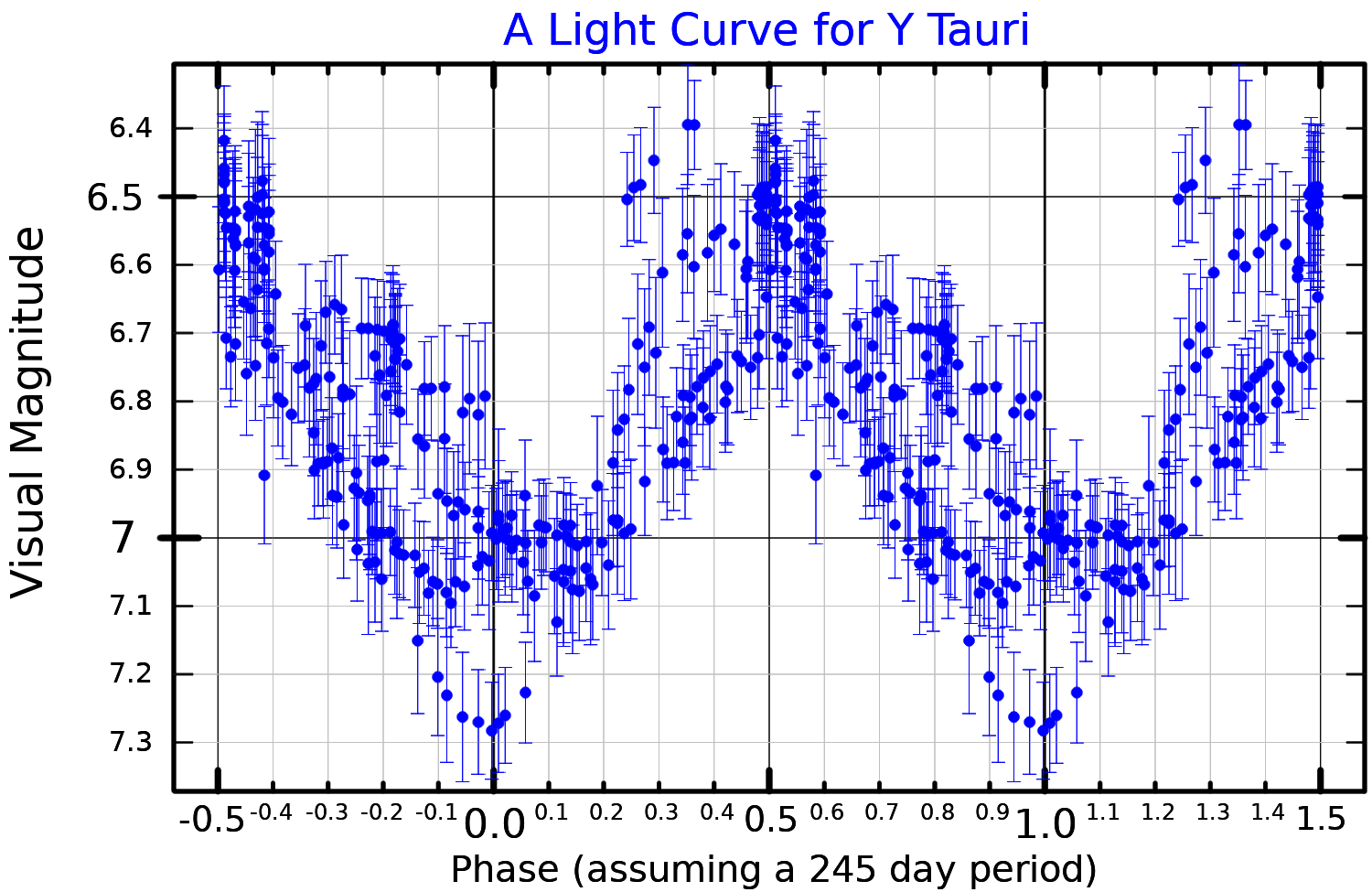
A visual band light curve for Y Tauri, plotted from ASAS data

In the 19th century, Thomas William Webb and John Birmingham noted that Y Tauri might be a variable star. Thomas William Backhouse confirmed that the star's brightness varies, in 1887. Y Tauri is a semiregular variable star. Its class is SRb, and its primary pulsation cycle lasts 241.5 days. No long secondary period has been identified. It has a radius of 219 R_{☉}, an effective surface temperature of 3,217 K, and a bolometric luminosity of 4,489 L_{☉}. Its mass is calculated to be 4.3 M_{☉}.

Y Tauri is losing mass at 4×10^{−7} M_{☉}/yr, and is surrounded by dust at a temperature of 1,900 K.
