= 36 Tauri =

Star in the constellation Taurus

Observation data Epoch J2000 Equinox ICRS
- Constellation: Taurus
- Right ascension: 04^{h} 04^{m} 21.67333^{s}
- Declination: +24° 06′ 21.5720″
- Apparent magnitude (V): 5.512

Characteristics
- Spectral type: K0II + B7V

Astrometry
Radial velocity (R_{v})	+10.38±0.06 km/s
Proper motion (μ)	RA: −0.54 mas/yr Dec.: −14.08 mas/yr
Parallax (π)	2.88±0.43 mas
Distance	approx. 1,100 ly (approx. 350 pc)
Absolute magnitude (M_{V})	−1.79 (−1.40 / −0.50)

Orbit
Period (P)	7.9412±0.0093 yr
Semi-major axis (a)	0.0289±0.0024″
Eccentricity (e)	0.683±0.006
Inclination (i)	149.4±6.9°
Longitude of the node (Ω)	260±15°
Periastron epoch (T)	B 1985.092±0.013
Argument of periastron (ω) (secondary)	287.7±1.6°
Semi-amplitude (K_{1}) (primary)	8.69±0.12 km/s

Other designations
- BD+23°609, HIP 19009, HR 1252, SAO 76425
- 36 Tauri A: HD 25555
- 36 Tauri B: HD 25556

Database references
SIMBAD	data

36 Tauri (abbreviated to 36 Tau) is a binary star in the constellation of Taurus. Parallax measurements made by the Hipparcos spacecraft put it at a distance of over 1,000 light years (350 parsecs) from Earth. The combined apparent magnitude of the system is about 5.5, meaning it can barely be seen with the naked eye, according to the Bortle scale.

36 Tauri is a spectroscopic binary. The two stars are close enough that periodic Doppler shifts in their spectra can be made out. In this case, light from both stars can be detected (and they overlap in the spectrum), so it is a double-lined system. The primary star, designated HD 25555, is a K-type bright giant, and the secondary star, designated HD 25556, is a B-type main-sequence star. However, the spectrum has also been interpreted as a G-type star and an A-type main-sequence star. The two stars have been resolved using speckle interferometry and are thought to have similar masses.
