= Xi Tauri =

Star system in the constellation Taurus

ξ Tauri
- Location of ξ Tauri (circled in red)

Observation data Epoch J2000.0 Equinox ICRS
- Constellation: Taurus
- Right ascension: 03^{h} 27^{m} 10.151^{s}
- Declination: +09° 43′ 57.63″
- Apparent magnitude (V): 3.73 - 3.81 (5.46 + 5.63 + 4.25)

Characteristics
- Spectral type: B9Vn + B9V + B5V + F5V
- Variable type: Algol

Astrometry
Proper motion (μ)	RA: 50.58±1.48 mas/yr Dec.: −39.54±1.40 mas/yr
Parallax (π)	4.96±0.51 mas
Distance	216 ly (66.1 pc)

Orbit
Primary	ξ Tau Aa
Name	ξ Tau Ab
Period (P)	7.147156 days
Semi-major axis (a)	0.119 au
Eccentricity (e)	0.0014
Inclination (i)	87.185°
Longitude of the node (Ω)	328.368°
Argument of periastron (ω) (secondary)	116.317°
Semi-amplitude (K_{1}) (primary)	87.79±0.25 km/s

Orbit
Primary	ξ Tau A
Name	ξ Tau B
Period (P)	145.785 days
Semi-major axis (a)	1.093 au
Eccentricity (e)	0.2075
Inclination (i)	86.554°
Longitude of the node (Ω)	328.349°
Argument of periastron (ω) (secondary)	341.108°
Semi-amplitude (K_{2}) (secondary)	38.37±0.19 km/s

Orbit
Primary	ξ Tau AB
Name	ξ Tau C
Period (P)	18,877.1 days
Semi-major axis (a)	29.44 au
Eccentricity (e)	0.576
Inclination (i)	−23.031°
Longitude of the node (Ω)	102.066°
Argument of periastron (ω) (secondary)	117.949°

Details

ξ Tau Aa
Mass	2.250 M_{☉}
Radius	1.691 R_{☉}
Surface gravity (log g)	4.337 cgs
Temperature	11,000 K
Rotation	5.860 days
Rotational velocity (v sin i)	14.6 km/s

ξ Tau Ab
Mass	2.154 M_{☉}
Radius	1.614 R_{☉}
Surface gravity (log g)	4.355 cgs
Temperature	10,602 K
Rotation	6.148 days
Rotational velocity (v sin i)	13.281 km/s

ξ Tau B
Mass	3.782 M_{☉}
Radius	2.446 R_{☉}
Surface gravity (log g)	4.238 cgs
Temperature	14,000 K
Rotation	0.510 days
Rotational velocity (v sin i)	242.262 km/s

ξ Tau C (single-star case)
Mass	1.344 M_{☉}
Radius	1.424 R_{☉}
Surface gravity (log g)	4.258 cgs
Temperature	6,487 K
Rotation	1.126 days
Rotational velocity (v sin i)	65.234 km/s

ξ Tau Ca (binary case, unconfirmed)
Mass	1.434 M_{☉}
Radius	1.500 R_{☉}
Surface gravity (log g)	4.241 cgs
Temperature	6,737 K
Rotation	1.126 days
Rotational velocity (v sin i)	65.234 km/s

ξ Tau Cb (binary case, unconfirmed)
Mass	0.78 M_{☉}
Radius	1.106 R_{☉}
Surface gravity (log g)	4.241 cgs
Temperature	6,737 K
Rotation	1.126 days
Rotational velocity (v sin i)	65.234 km/s

Other designations
- 2 Tau, HR 1038, HD 21364, BD+09°439, HIP 16083, SAO 111195

Database references
SIMBAD	data

Xi Tauri (ξ Tau, ξ Tauri) is a hierarchical quadruple system in the constellation Taurus.

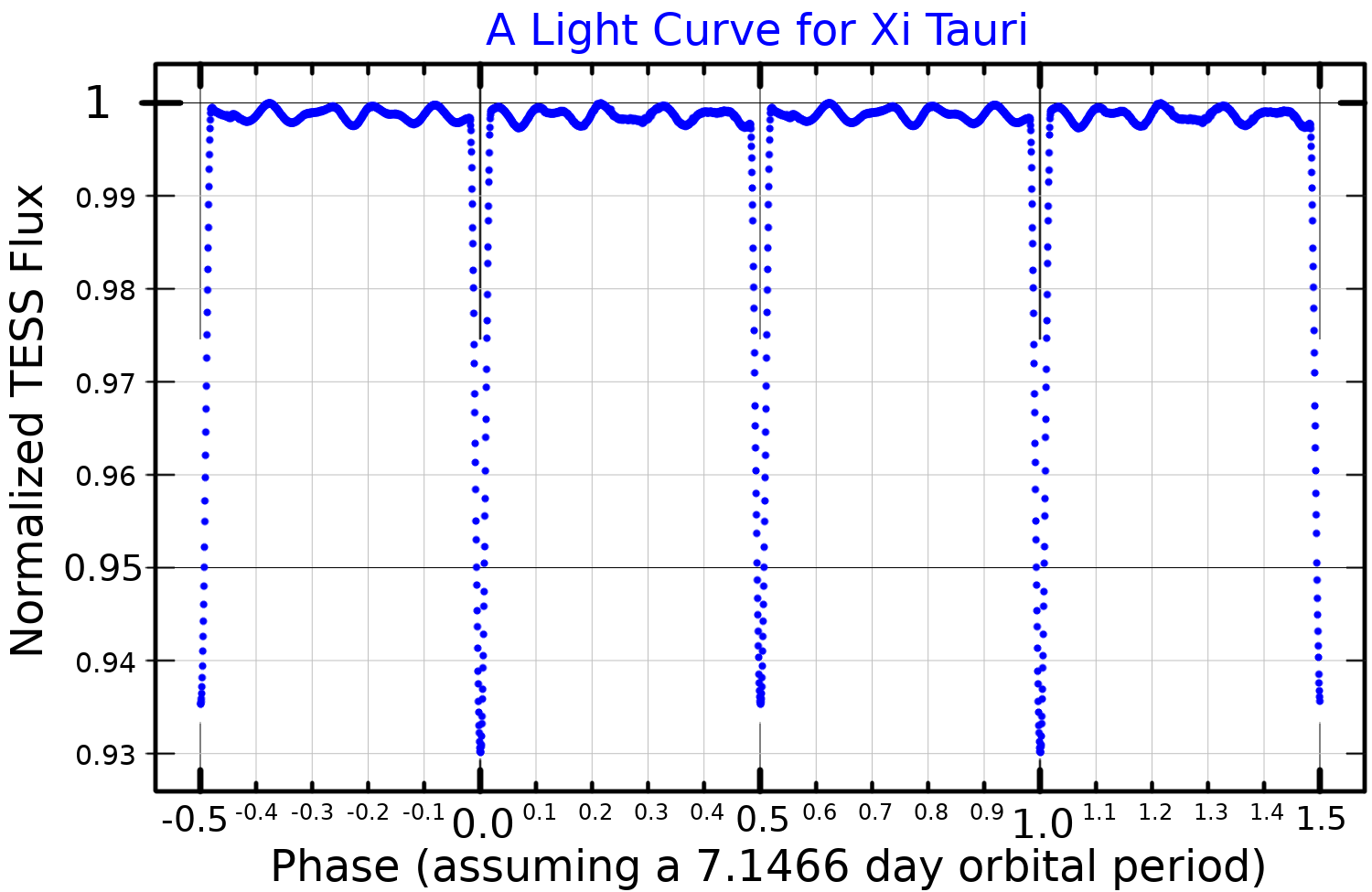
A light curve for Xi Tauri plotted from TESS data

Xi Tauri is a spectroscopic and eclipsing quadruple star. It consists of three blue-white B-type main sequence stars and an F-type main sequence star. Two of the stars form an eclipsing binary system and revolve around each other once every 7.15 days. These in turn orbit the third star once every 145 days. The fourth star is a F star that orbits the other three stars in a roughly fifty-year period and has been resolved optically. The best-fit orbital fit would require it to be a binary system itself, with a semi-major axis of 0.020 au. The brightest and most massive of the four stars is the "third" star, although the eclipsing pair have a greater combined mass and hence are generally considered to be the primary.

The typical combined apparent magnitude of the system is +3.73, but because the two inner stars eclipse one another during their orbits, it is classified as a variable star, and its brightness varies from magnitude +3.73 to +3.81. Xi Tauri is approximately 210 light years from Earth.

Nomenclature for the four stars varies. Some sources refer to the faint resolved companion as component C, while others refer to it as B. Similarly, the inner three stars are respectively Aa, Ab, and B, or Aa, Ab, and Ac.
