= 88 Tauri =

Fourth magnitude multiple star system in the constellation Taurus

- Location of 88 Tauri (circled in red)

Observation data Epoch J2000 Equinox ICRS
- Constellation: Taurus
- 88 Tau A
- Right ascension: 04^{h} 35^{m} 39.25910^{s}
- Declination: +10° 09′ 38.8396″
- Apparent magnitude (V): 4.250
- 88 Tau B
- Right ascension: 04^{h} 35^{m} 35.1775^{s}
- Declination: +10° 10′ 13.572″
- Apparent magnitude (V): 7.84

Characteristics

88 Tau A
- Spectral type: A6m / F5 / G2-3: / G2-3:
- U−B color index: +0.08
- B−V color index: +0.19

88 Tau B
- Spectral type: F8V / M?
- U−B color index: +0.04
- B−V color index: +0.54

Astrometry

88 Tau A
Radial velocity (R_{v})	23.97 km/s
Proper motion (μ)	RA: +43.13 mas/yr Dec.: −52.71 mas/yr
Parallax (π)	20.88±0.94 mas
Distance	156 ± 7 ly (48 ± 2 pc)

88 Tau B
Radial velocity (R_{v})	23.97 km/s
Proper motion (μ)	RA: +51.8 mas/yr Dec.: −49.4 mas/yr

Orbit
Primary	88 Tau Aa
Name	88 Tau Ab
Period (P)	6,585±12 d
Semi-major axis (a)	240.1±5.3 mas 12.17±0.17 AU
Eccentricity (e)	0.0715±0.0026
Inclination (i)	69.923±0.048°
Longitude of the node (Ω)	146.734±0.067°
Periastron epoch (T)	2,455,261±22
Argument of periastron (ω) (secondary)	205.7±1.2°

Orbit
Primary	88 Tau Aa1
Name	88 Tau Aa2
Period (P)	3.571096±0.000003 d
Semi-major axis (a)	1.359±0.034 mas 0.0689±0.0012 AU
Eccentricity (e)	0
Inclination (i)	110.6±2.7°
Longitude of the node (Ω)	287.5±1.8°
Argument of periastron (ω) (secondary)	0°

Orbit
Primary	88 Tau Ab1
Name	88 Tau Ab2
Period (P)	7.886969 ± 0.000066 d
Semi-major axis (a)	1.967±0.054 mas 0.0997±0.0021 AU
Eccentricity (e)	0
Inclination (i)	27.23±0.72°
Longitude of the node (Ω)	34.0±8.2°
Periastron epoch (T)	2,452,507.31±0.02
Argument of periastron (ω) (secondary)	0°

Orbit
Primary	88 Tau Ba
Name	88 Tau Bb
Period (P)	1,350±35 d
Semi-major axis (a)	0.057″
Eccentricity (e)	0.663±0.075
Periastron epoch (T)	2,450,498±34
Argument of periastron (ω) (secondary)	223±9°
Semi-amplitude (K_{1}) (primary)	3.24±0.44 km/s

Details

88 Tau Aa1
Mass	2.06±0.11 M_{☉}
Rotational velocity (v sin i)	37±2 km/s

88 Tau Aa2
Mass	1.361±0.073 M_{☉}
Rotational velocity (v sin i)	17±2 km/s

88 Tau Ab1
Mass	1.069±0.069 M_{☉}
Rotational velocity (v sin i)	5±3 km/s

88 Tau Ab2
Mass	1.057±0.068 M_{☉}
Rotational velocity (v sin i)	5±3 km/s

88 Tau Ba
Mass	1.2 M_{☉}

88 Tau Bb
Mass	>0.15 M_{☉}

Other designations
- ADS 3317, CCDM J04356+1010, WDS J04357+1010AB
- 88 Tau A: d Tau, 88 Tau, BD+09°607, HD 29140, HIP 21402, SAO 94026, HR 1458, GC 5599
- 88 Tau B: BD+09°606, HD 286909, SAO 94024, GC 5596, TYC 673-1487-1

Database references
SIMBAD	88 Tau
- 88 Tau A
- 88 Tau B

88 Tauri, also known as d Tauri, is a multiple star system in the constellation Taurus. It has an apparent magnitude of about 4.25, meaning that it is visible to the naked eye. Based upon parallax measurements made by the Hipparcos spacecraft, the star system is some 156 light-years (48 parsecs) from the Sun.

88 Tauri is a sextuple star system, meaning that it contains six stars in a hierarchical orbit. The brighter component, 88 Tauri A, is a quadruple system consisting of two spectroscopic binaries orbiting each other with an orbital period of 18 years. The fainter component, 88 Tauri B, is also a spectroscopic binary, and is about 69 arcseconds away, bringing up the total to six stars.

== Orbit ==
Aa1
Period = 3.571d a = 1.36 mas
Aa2
Period = 6585d a = 0.24″
Ab1
Period = 7.887d a = 1.97 mas
Ab2
69.6″ separation
Ba
Period = 1350d a = 0.057 mas
Bb

Hierarchy of orbits in the 88 Tauri system

88 Tauri A is a fourth-magnitude star with two components, 88 Tauri Aa and 88 Tauri Ab. 88 Tauri Aa and Ab orbit each other once every 18 years and are separated by about 0.28 arcseconds. Those two components themselves are spectroscopic binaries: binary stars that are too close to be resolved but can be detected by periodic Doppler shifts in their spectrum. In this case, variability in the radial velocity has been recognized as early as 1907. The Aa pair has an orbital period of 3.57 days, the Ab pair has an orbital period of 7.89 days, and both have circular orbits with low orbital eccentricities.

88 Tauri B, 69.56 arcseconds away, is a seventh-magnitude star that is also a binary star system. It is another spectroscopic binary whose components (88 Tauri Ba and Bb) orbit each other every 3.69 years. The orbit of 88 Tauri B around 88 Tauri A likely takes about 70,000 years.

== Properties ==
88 Tauri Aa has a spectral type of A6m, indicating that it is an A-type star. The "m" in its spectral type means that it is an Am star, also known as a metallic-line star. These types of stars have spectra indicating varying amounts of metals, like iron. The rest of the stars in 88 Tauri A have spectral types ranging from F5 to G2-3, meaning that they are regular F-type or G-type main-sequence stars. The spectral types for 88 Tauri Ab1 and Ab2 are less certain, because their spectral lines are weaker, hence the colon after G2. Aa1 does not appears to be rotating synchronously with its companion (nor does it have a convective atmosphere), unlike Aa2. (It is not known if the two stars of 88 Tauri Ab are in synchronous rotation with each other, because of the relatively high errors in their measurements.)

88 Tauri B consists of a F-type main sequence star, with another low-mass star. The mass of the smaller component is at least 0.15 solar masses, so it is most likely a red dwarf.
