= 57 Tauri =

Variable star in the constellation Taurus

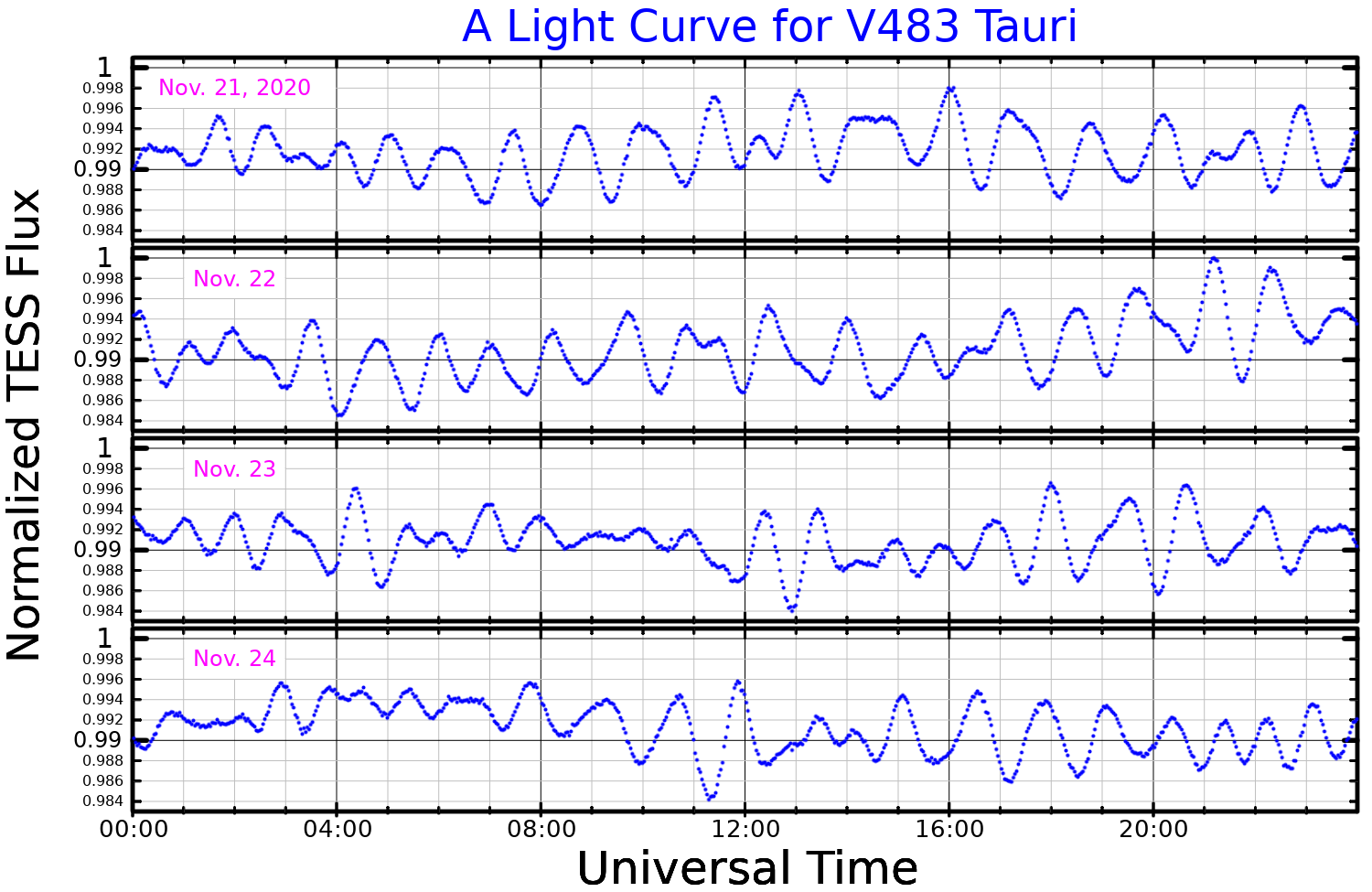
- A light curve for V483 Tauri, plotted from TESS data.

Observation data Epoch J2000.0 Equinox J2000.0
- Constellation: Taurus
- Right ascension: 04^{h} 19^{m} 57.70457^{s}
- Declination: +14° 02′ 06.7322″
- Apparent magnitude (V): 5.55 - 5.59

Characteristics
- Evolutionary stage: main sequence
- Spectral type: F0 IV
- B−V color index: 0.283
- Variable type: δ Scuti

Astrometry
Proper motion (μ)	RA: 115.369±0.078 mas/yr Dec.: −18.825±0.052 mas/yr
Parallax (π)	21.9777±0.0621 mas
Distance	148.4 ± 0.4 ly (45.5 ± 0.1 pc)
Absolute magnitude (M_{V})	5.56

Orbit
Primary	δ Scuti star
Period (P)	2.4860±0.0017 d
Eccentricity (e)	0.028±0.010
Longitude of the node (Ω)	140.5±20.4°
Periastron epoch (T)	2451164.968±0.144
Semi-amplitude (K_{1}) (primary)	29.906±0.316 km/s

Details
Mass	1.6 M_{☉}
Radius	2.0 R_{☉}
Luminosity	9.8 L_{☉}
Surface gravity (log g)	4.00 cgs
Temperature	7,258 K
Metallicity [Fe/H]	0.051 dex
Rotation	0.905 d
Rotational velocity (v sin i)	97.6 km/s
Age	1.2 Gyr

Other designations
- h Tauri, HD 27397, V0483 Tauri, HR 1351, HIP 20219, SAO 93872, BD+13 663

Database references
SIMBAD	data

57 Tauri, also known as h Tauri and V483 Tauri, is a star 148 light years from the Earth, in the constellation Taurus. It is a 5th magnitude star, so it will be visible to the naked eye of an observer located far from city lights. 57 Tauri is a member of the Hyades star cluster. It is a Delta Scuti variable star, whose brightness changes slightly, ranging from magnitude 5.55 to 5.59.

In 1908, Lewis Boss listed 57 Tauri as a member of the Hyades cluster based upon its proper motion agreeing with the motions of other cluster members. Its membership in the cluster was firmly established forty-four years later by Hendrik van Bueren, using both proper motion and radial velocity. 57 Tauri is located 10.8 light years from the core of the Hyades cluster.

Robert Millis discovered that 57 Tauri is a variable star, in 1967. He reported that the amplitude varied by 0.02 magnitudes with a period of 1.5 hours. In 1972, it was given the variable star designation V483 Tauri. A year 2000 study of 57 Tauri, based on 54 nights of photometric data, identified twelve pulsation frequencies ranging in period from 58.6 minutes to 6.17 days.

In 1999, Anthony Kaye discovered that 57 Tauri is a spectroscopic binary by examining 139 high signal-to-noise spectra obtained at Kitt Peak.
