= 41 Tauri =

Star in the constellation Taurus

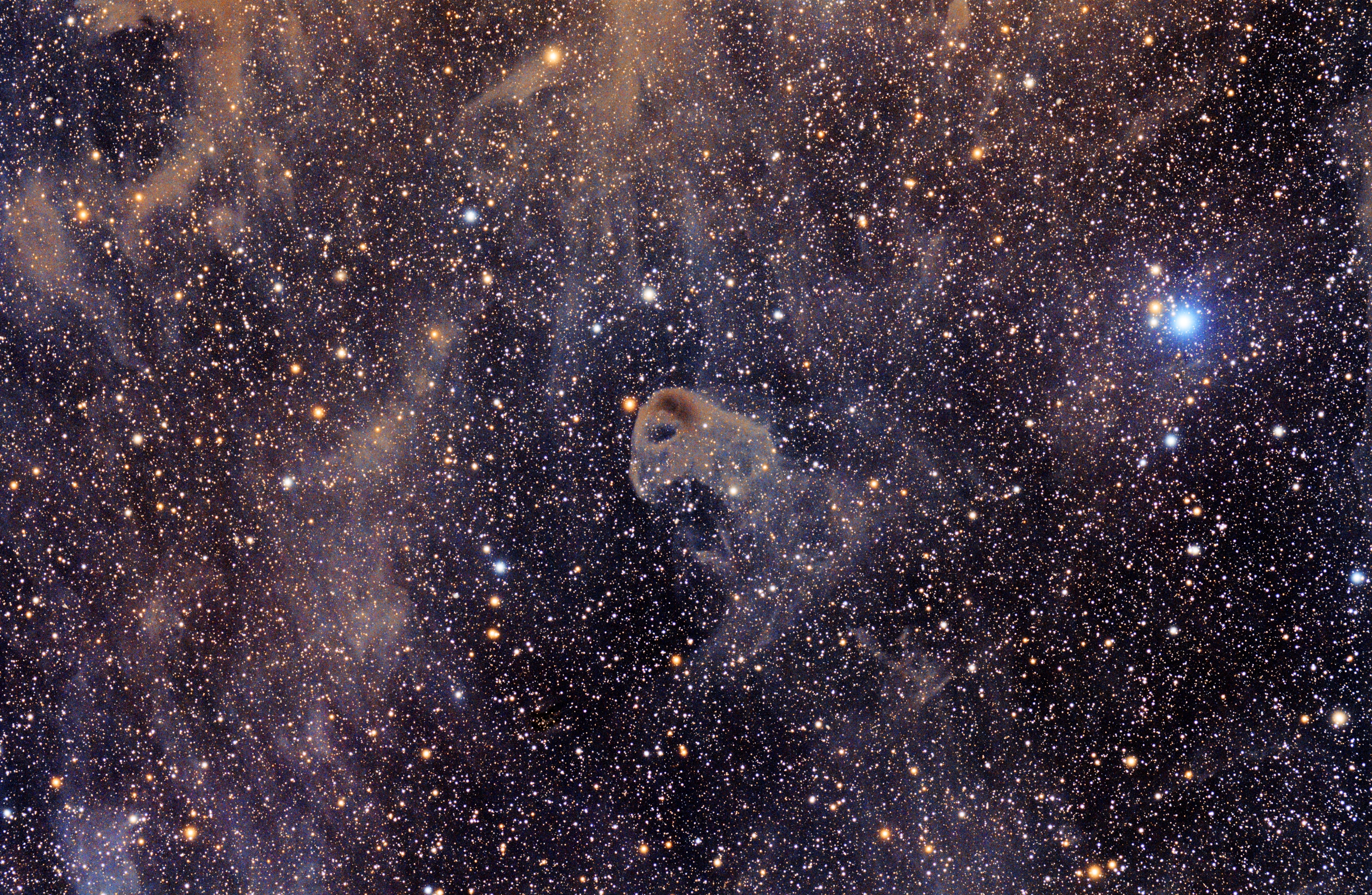
- 41 Tauri is the brightest star on the right of the molecular cloud LBN 777.

Observation data Epoch J2000.0 Equinox ICRS
- Constellation: Taurus
- Right ascension: 04^{h} 06^{m} 36.413^{s}
- Declination: +27° 35′ 59.64″
- Apparent magnitude (V): 5.19

Characteristics
- Evolutionary stage: main sequence
- Spectral type: B9 p Si
- U−B color index: −0.47
- B−V color index: −0.12
- Variable type: α^{2} CVn

Astrometry
Radial velocity (R_{v})	−2.0 km/s
Proper motion (μ)	RA: +21.153 mas/yr Dec.: −51.792 mas/yr
Parallax (π)	8.0667±0.1063 mas
Distance	404 ± 5 ly (124 ± 2 pc)

Orbit
Period (P)	7.2274 d
Eccentricity (e)	0.18
Semi-amplitude (K_{1}) (primary)	16.60 km/s

Details
Mass	2.9 M_{☉}
Radius	3.54 R_{☉}
Luminosity	190 L_{☉}
Surface gravity (log g)	3.87 cgs
Temperature	12,600 K
Metallicity [Fe/H]	0.43 dex
Rotational velocity (v sin i)	23 km/s
Age	146 Myr

Other designations
- GS Tau, BD+27°633, HD 25823, HIP 19171, HR 1268, SAO 76455

Database references
SIMBAD	data

41 Tauri is a single-lined spectroscopic binary system in the zodiacal constellation of Taurus; 41 Tauri is its Flamsteed designation. The star has a visual magnitude of 5.19, making it visible to the naked eye from brighter suburban skies (according to the Bortle scale). Parallax measurements put it at a distance of roughly 404 light years from the Sun.

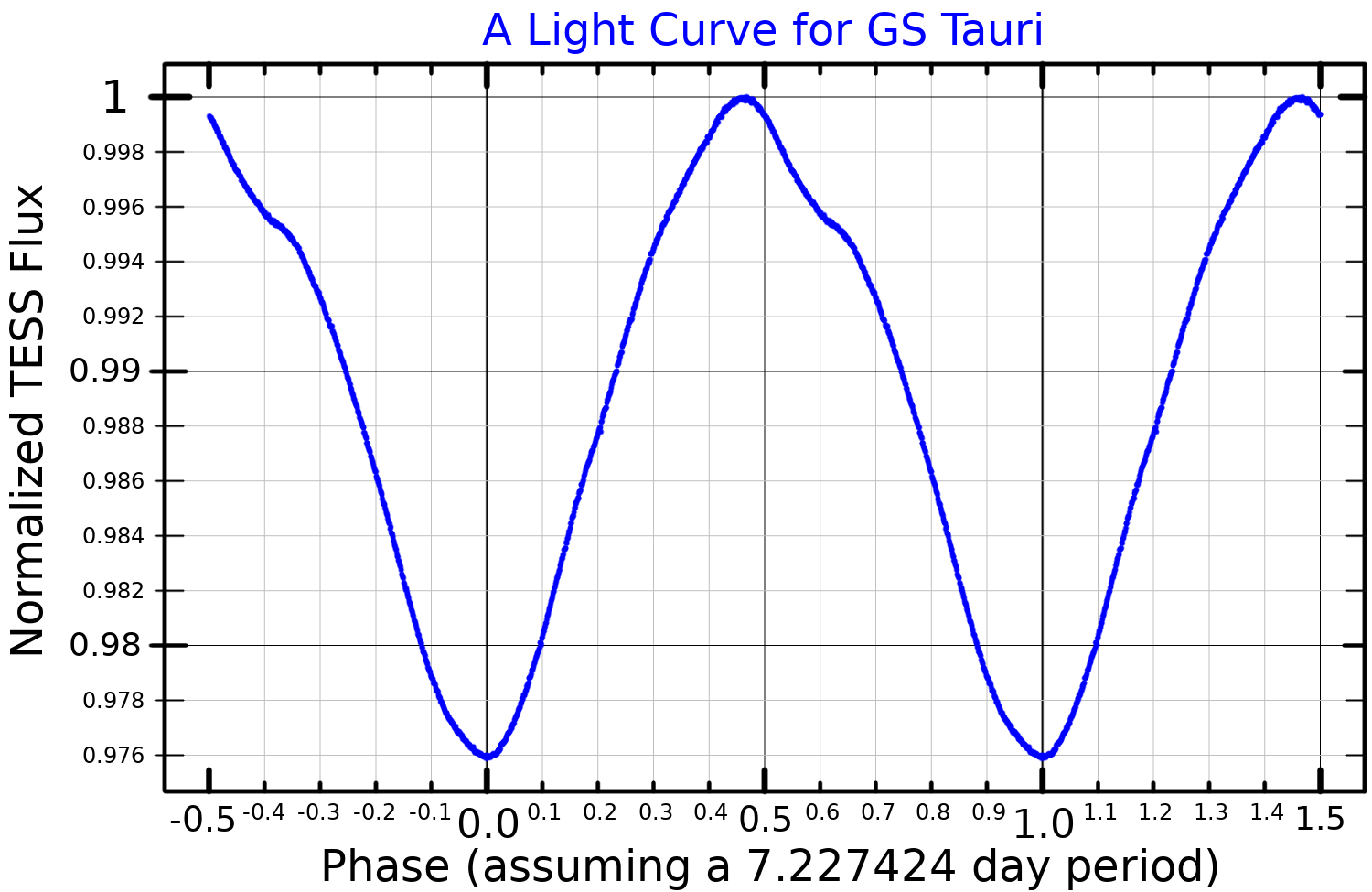
A light curve for GS Tauri (41 Tauri), plotted from TESS data

This is a chemically peculiar star and was first classified as a silicon star by American astronomer William Morgan in 1933. The stellar spectrum displays an overabundance of heavier elements; particularly silicon and gallium. These abundances may be caused by the magnetic field of the star, which produces concentrations of the observed elements in the outer atmosphere. In 1962, Karl D. Rakos announced that 41 Tauri is a variable star based on observations made in 1960 and 1961. It is an α² Canum Venaticorum-type variable star, ranging in magnitude from 5.15 down to 5.22. These variations are likely due to large spots or rings on the side of the star being observed.

The star and its companion orbit each other closely with a period of a week and an eccentricity of 0.18. The rotation period of the primary star has become locked to its orbit, so that one face is always pointed toward its companion. The abundance of gallium and silicon varies in a sinusoidal pattern that matches this period.

The primary has around 2.9 times the mass of the Sun, 3.5 times the Sun's radius, and is emitting 190 times the luminosity of the Sun. The effective temperature of the star's photosphere is 12,600 K, giving it the blue-white hue of a B-type star.
