= SZ Tauri =

Variable star in Taurus

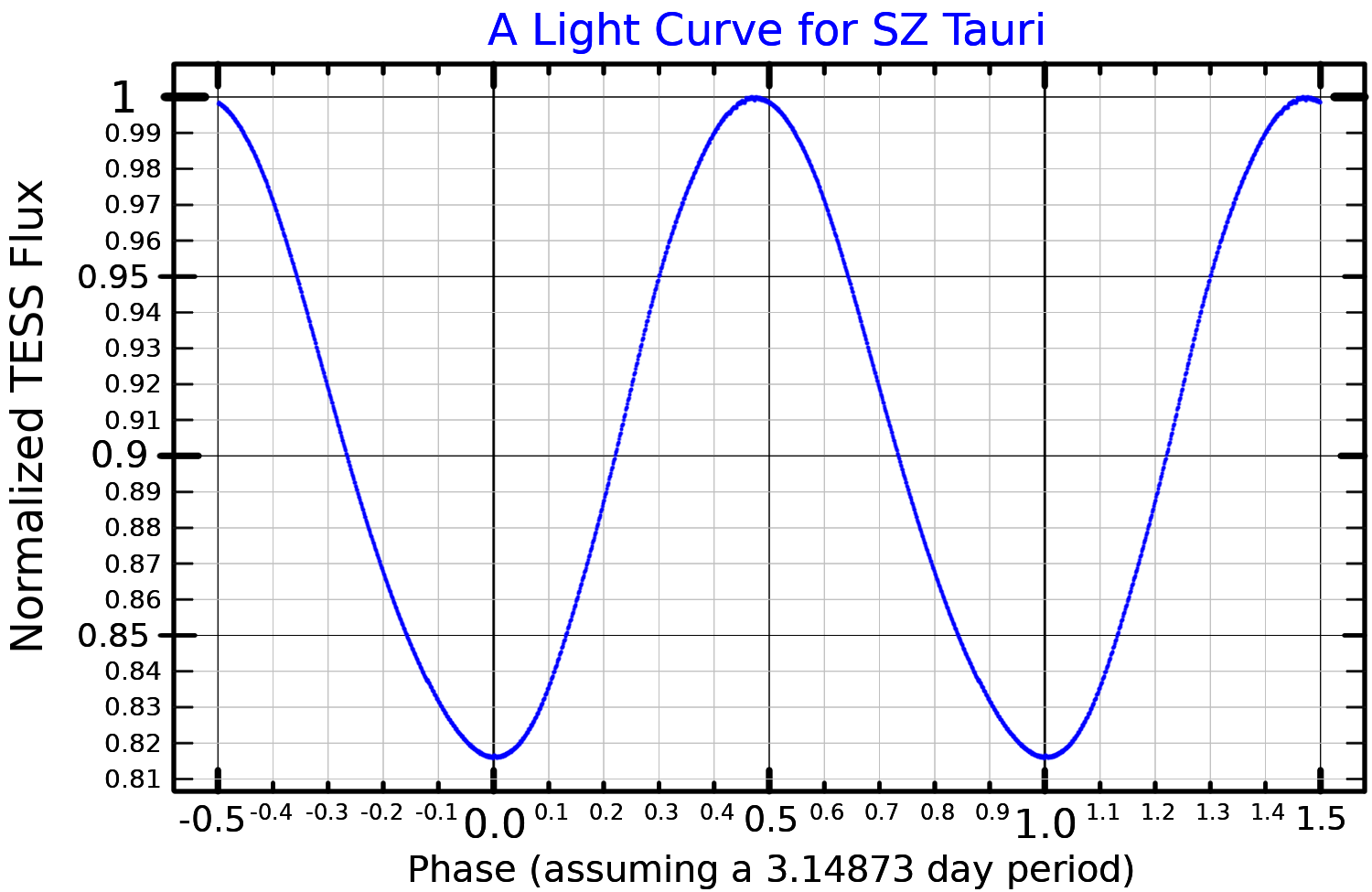
- A light curve for SZ Tauri, plotted from TESS data

Observation data Epoch J2000 Equinox J2000
- Constellation: Taurus
- Right ascension: 04^{h} 37^{m} 14.778^{s}
- Declination: +18° 32′ 34.93″
- Apparent magnitude (V): 6.39 to 6.69

Characteristics
- Evolutionary stage: Supergiant
- Spectral type: F5Ib-F9.5Ib
- B−V color index: 0.810±0.025
- Variable type: δ Cep

Astrometry
Radial velocity (R_{v})	−1.2±0.2 km/s
Proper motion (μ)	RA: −4.403 mas/yr Dec.: −5.232 mas/yr
Parallax (π)	1.5741±0.028 mas
Distance	2,070 ± 40 ly (640 ± 10 pc)

Details
Mass	6.1±0.8 M_{☉}
Radius	42.2±3.0 R_{☉}
Luminosity	1,905 L_{☉}
Surface gravity (log g)	2.0–2.2 cgs
Temperature	6,015–6,420 K
Metallicity [Fe/H]	0.08 dex
Age	69–80 Myr

Other designations
- SZ Tau, BD+18 661, GC 5621, HD 29260, HIP 21517, SAO 94036, PPM 120081

Database references
SIMBAD	data

SZ Tauri is a variable star in the equatorial constellation of Taurus. The brightness of this star varies from an apparent visual magnitude of 6.39 down to 6.69 with a period of 3.149 days, which is near the lower limit of visibility to the naked eye. The distance to this star is approximately 2,070 light years based on parallax measurements. There is some indication this may be a binary system, but the evidence is inconclusive.

The variability of this star was announced by K. Schwarzschild in 1911 and was given a preliminary designation of 41.1910 with a period of 3.1484 d. H. S. Leavitt extended the study up to 1914, producing a light curve with a period of 3.1487 d. A 1916 spectral study by H. Shapley showed that the class of this pulsating Cepheid variable changed along the light curve, ranging from F7 at minimum up to A9 at peak luminosity. Y. N. Efremov suggested in 1964 that this star may be a halo member of the NGC 1647 open cluster, located 2.2° to the northeast. However, this was later disputed based on a poor proper motion match. It was confirmed to be a classical Cepheid by W. P. Gieren in 1985.

In the General Catalogue of Variable Stars, SZ Tau is classified as a Delta Cepheid of type DCEPS, which shows a nearly symmetric light curve with a small amplitude. It is pulsating in the first overtone and in evolutionary terms is undergoing its second crossing of the Cepheid instability strip. By 1987, four changes in the pulsation period of SZ Tau had been observed; the pulsation rate is decreasing by −0.49 s/yr. The star is about 75 million years old with six times the mass of the Sun and 42 times the Sun's radius. The effective temperature, radius, and spectral type of the star vary across each pulsation cycle.
