= HD 28736 =

Star system in the constellation Taurus

- Location of HD 28736 (circled)

Observation data Epoch J2000 Equinox ICRS
- Constellation: Taurus
- HD 28736 A
- Right ascension: 04^{h} 32^{m} 04.80859^{s}
- Declination: +05° 24′ 36.1482″
- Apparent magnitude (V): 6.352
- HD 28736 C
- Right ascension: 04^{h} 33^{m} 56.59566^{s}
- Declination: +05° 37′ 23.5351″

Characteristics
- Spectral type: (F5V + L9-T1) + L0/1
- B−V color index: +0.431

Astrometry

HD 28736 A
Radial velocity (R_{v})	39.5813 ± 0.0216 km/s
Proper motion (μ)	RA: 112.174 mas/yr Dec.: 7.756 mas/yr
Parallax (π)	23.1089±0.0278 mas
Distance	141.1 ± 0.2 ly (43.27 ± 0.05 pc)
Absolute magnitude (M_{V})	3.18

HD 28736 C
Proper motion (μ)	RA: 107.173 mas/yr Dec.: 7.595 mas/yr
Parallax (π)	22.6203±0.4505 mas
Distance	144 ± 3 ly (44.2 ± 0.9 pc)

Orbit
Primary	HD 28736 A
Name	HD 28736 B
Period (P)	60+30 −16 yr
Semi-major axis (a)	0.37" (17+5 −4 AU)
Eccentricity (e)	0.36+0.37 −0.25
Inclination (i)	95.3+3.9 −2.1°

Orbit
Primary	HD 28736 A
Name	HD 28736 C
Semi-major axis (a)	1837" (79000 AU)

Details

HD 28736 A
Mass	1.40±0.05 M_{☉}
Surface gravity (log g)	4.3±0.2 cgs
Temperature	6655±125 K
Metallicity [Fe/H]	0.13±0.05 dex
Rotational velocity (v sin i)	45.6±1.8 km/s
Age	650±100 Myr

HD 28736 B
Mass	24+6 −4 M_{Jup}
Surface gravity (log g)	4.5 cgs
Temperature	1300±50 K

HD 28736 C
Mass	73±7 M_{Jup}
Radius	0.10 R_{☉}
Luminosity	2.40+0.23 −0.21×10^{−4} L_{☉}

Other designations
- HD 28736 AB: 58 G. Tauri, AG+05°479, BD+05°674, GC 5531, HD 28736, HIP 21152, HR 1436, SAO 111879, PPM 147652, TIC 452767166, TYC 90-33-1, GSC 00090-00033, 2MASS J04320481+0524359, Gaia DR3 3285426613077584384
- HD 28736 C: 2MASS J04335658+0537235, WISE J043356.65+053723.5, Gaia DR3 3285527699426683264

Database references
SIMBAD	HD 28736
- B
- C

HD 28736 (HIP 21152, HR 1436) is a triple star system in the constellation of Taurus. It is composed of an F-type main-sequence star, an orbiting low-mass brown dwarf or giant planet, and a high-mass brown dwarf or low-mass star. Located some 141 light-years (43 parsecs) away according to Gaia DR3 parallax measurements, it is a member of the Hyades cluster, moving away from Earth at a heliocentric radial velocity of 39.58 km/s. With an apparent magnitude of 6.352, it is near the limit for naked eye visibility under dark skies.

== Stellar components ==
=== HD 28736 A ===
HD 28736 A is a young star, aged 650 ± 100 million years. This was estimated from the age of the Hyades cluster itself, which is about 625 million years. It is about 40% more massive than the Sun and also hotter at 6,655 K (6,382 °C; 11,519 °F).

The star is enriched in many elements heavier than hydrogen and helium compared to the Sun. In particular, the concentrations of strontium, barium, lanthanum, cerium, samarium, and gadolinium are at least 150% greater. A similar pattern is observed in other F-type dwarfs belonging to the cluster.

=== HD 28736 B ===
In 2022, three teams of astronomers independently announced the discovery of a brown dwarf orbiting HD 28736 A via direct imaging, the first brown dwarf to be discovered by this method around main-sequence stars in the Hyades and the first substellar object of any kind to be found in the cluster to orbit stars with a spectral type of F, G, or K.

The object, HD 28736 B, is near the border between L and T dwarfs, with an estimated spectral type of T0 ± 1. It has a mass of 24 M_{J} (~2% of the host star mass), substantially lower than evolutionary model predictions and close to the planet-brown dwarf boundary. Indeed, some organizations classify it as a planet instead, such as the NASA Exoplanet Science Institute, which includes the object in the NASA Exoplanet Archive (Note: The NASA Exoplanet Archive lists the object as HIP 21152 b, rather than using the capital B.) since it weighs less than 30 M_{J}. It completes one orbit around the star every 60 years at a distance of 17 AU (2.5×10^{9} km), slightly closer than Uranus is to the Sun (19.165 AU).

=== HD 28736 C ===
One of the teams that discovered HD 28736 B reported that another object, 2MASS J04335658+0537235, was found to be a co-moving companion to the HD 28736 system, at a very wide projected separation of 79,000 AU (1.25 ly) at the host star's distance. The 3D separation is even larger at 250000±140000 AU (4.0±2.2 ly), comparable to the distance between the Sun and Alpha Centauri. Despite this, there is a high likelihood that the object is gravitationally bound to the system.

It has a mass of 73±7 M_{J}, placing it right at the hydrogen burning limit. As such, it is uncertain whether the object is a massive brown dwarf or a low-mass star.

== Nearby interstellar clouds ==
Observations via the Space Telescope Imaging Spectrograph, installed on the Hubble Space Telescope, revealed three distinct velocity components in the interstellar absorption seen in HD 28736's spectra, specifically in the emission lines of singly ionized magnesium (Mg II in spectroscopic notation). This corresponds to three interstellar clouds occupying the space between the system and Earth, all moving in different directions and speeds.

The closest of the three is the Local Interstellar Cloud (LIC), which the Solar System is within and thus absorbs light emitted by all Hyades members. A secondary cloud, dubbed the Hyades Cloud, is located farther than the LIC and possesses a more filament-like structure, absorbing light from a substantial portion of Hyades stars. A third cloud has been identified that affects light from HD 28736 but not other stars in the vicinity, meaning it only covers a small patch of the sky and hence is probably situated farther away than the Hyades Cloud.
