= Omega1 Tauri =

Star in the constellation Taurus

Omega^{1} Tauri
- Location of ω^{1} Tauri (circled in red)

Observation data Epoch J2000.0 Equinox J2000.0 (ICRS)
- Constellation: Taurus
- Right ascension: 04^{h} 07^{m} 09.97^{s}
- Declination: +19° 36′ 33.2″
- Apparent magnitude (V): +5.51

Characteristics
- Evolutionary stage: horizontal branch
- Spectral type: K2 III
- B−V color index: 1.077

Astrometry
Radial velocity (R_{v})	+24.75±0.02 km/s
Proper motion (μ)	RA: −65.05 mas/yr Dec.: −60.50 mas/yr
Parallax (π)	11.22±0.70 mas
Distance	290 ± 20 ly (89 ± 6 pc)
Absolute magnitude (M_{V})	+0.76

Details
Mass	1.53 M_{☉}
Radius	12 R_{☉}
Luminosity	57.5 L_{☉}
Surface gravity (log g)	2.5 cgs
Temperature	4,737±77 K
Metallicity [Fe/H]	0.12 dex
Rotational velocity (v sin i)	4.6 km/s
Age	4.21 Gyr

Other designations
- ω^{1} Tau, 43 Tau, BD+19°672, FK5 1115, HD 26162, HIP 19388, HR 1283, SAO 93785

Database references
SIMBAD	data

Omega^{1} Tauri is a solitary, orange hued star in the zodiac constellation of Taurus. It is faintly visible to the naked eye with an apparent visual magnitude of +5.51. Based upon an annual parallax shift of 11.22 mas as seen from Earth, it is located about 290 light years from the Sun.

This is an evolved K-type giant star with a stellar classification of K2 III. At the estimated age of 4.2 billion years, it is a red clump star that is generating energy by helium fusion at its core. Omega^{1} Tauri has about 1.5 times the mass of the Sun and has expanded to around 12 times the Sun's radius. It is radiating 57.5 times the Sun's luminosity from its photosphere at an effective temperature of 4,737 K. The radial velocity of this star shows no appreciable variation, and for this reason it is used as a radial velocity standard.
