= 7 Tauri =

Multiple star system in the constellation Taurus

Observation data Epoch J2000 Equinox J2000
Constellation	Taurus
- A
Right ascension	03^{h} 34^{m} 26.629^{s}
Declination	+35° 27′ 51.86″
- Apparent magnitude (V): 6.58
- B
Right ascension	03^{h} 34^{m} 26.633^{s}
Declination	+35° 27′ 52.17″
- Apparent magnitude (V): 6.84

Characteristics

A
- Spectral type: A3V
- B−V color index: +0.13

B
- Spectral type: A3V
- B−V color index: +0.13

Astrometry
Radial velocity (R_{v})	+28.1 km/s
Proper motion (μ)	RA: +9.908 mas/yr Dec.: −28.201 mas/yr
Parallax (π)	5.4993±0.0587 mas
Distance	593 ± 6 ly (182 ± 2 pc)
Absolute magnitude (M_{V})	+0.5/+0.6

Orbit
Period (P)	522.16 yr
Semi-major axis (a)	0.625″
Eccentricity (e)	0.679

Details

A
Mass	2.5 M_{☉}
Radius	9.0 R_{☉}
Luminosity	52 L_{☉}
Temperature	8,551 K

B
Mass	2.5 M_{☉}

Other designations
- 7 Tau, BD+23°473, HD 22091, HIP 16664, HR 1086

Database references
SIMBAD	data

7 Tauri is a multiple star in the northern constellation of Taurus. It has a combined apparent visual magnitude of 5.95, so, according to the Bortle scale, it is faintly visible from suburban skies at night. Measurements made with the Gaia spacecraft show an annual parallax shift of 5.5 mas, which is equivalent to a distance of around 593 light years from the Sun.

7 Tauri is a binary star with two nearly equal components about 0.7″ apart, designated as A and B. The spectrum of each star matches a stellar classification of A7V. 22″ away is a 10th-magnitude star, component C, which is itself a spectroscopic binary. In the past, these stars had been treated as a single system, but they are now known to have different proper motions and somewhat different distances.
