= Rho Tauri =

Star in the constellation Taurus

ρ Tauri
- Location of ρ Tauri (circled)

Observation data Epoch J2000.0 Equinox ICRS
- Constellation: Taurus
- Right ascension: 04^{h} 33^{m} 50.91753^{s}
- Declination: +14° 50′ 39.9232″
- Apparent magnitude (V): 4.66

Characteristics
- Evolutionary stage: main sequence
- Spectral type: A8V
- U−B color index: +0.09
- B−V color index: +0.24
- Variable type: δ Scuti

Astrometry
Radial velocity (R_{v})	+39.6 km/s
Proper motion (μ)	RA: 103.20 mas/yr Dec.: −26.48 mas/yr
Parallax (π)	20.61±0.57 mas
Distance	158 ± 4 ly (49 ± 1 pc)
Absolute magnitude (M_{V})	+1.26

Orbit
Period (P)	58.94±0.09 days
Semi-major axis (a)	0.48 au
Eccentricity (e)	0.31±0.16

Details

A
Mass	2.21 M_{☉}
Radius	1.9 (Note: Calculated with a distance (d) of 46.97 parsecs and an angular diameter (𝜃) of 0.377 mas using the equation R / R_{☉} = 0.1075 • 𝜃 • d.) R_{☉}
Age	630 Myr

B
Mass	2.12 M_{☉}
Radius	1.72 (Note: Calculated with a distance (d) of 46.97 parsecs and an angular diameter (𝜃) of 0.341 mas using the equation R / R_{☉} = 0.1075 • 𝜃 • d.) R_{☉}
Age	630 Myr

Other designations
- ρ Tau, 86 Tau, BD+14 720, FK5 1125, HD 28910, HIP 21273, HR 1444, SAO 94007

Database references
SIMBAD	data

Rho Tauri (ρ Tau, ρ Tauri) is a binary star in the constellation Taurus and a member of the Hyades star cluster. The system has an apparent magnitude of +4.66 and a combined spectral type of A8V. Since one stars (or both) is a Delta Scuti variable, the apparent magnitude varies by 0.010 magnitudes over a period of 1.61 hours.

== Characteristics ==
This is a spectroscopic binary system. The two stars have an orbtial period of 58.94 days and a semi-major axis of 0.48 astronomical units. The primary has a mass of 2.21 solar masses and a radius of 1.90 solar radii, while the secondary has a mass of 2.12 solar masses and a radius of 1.72 solar radii.

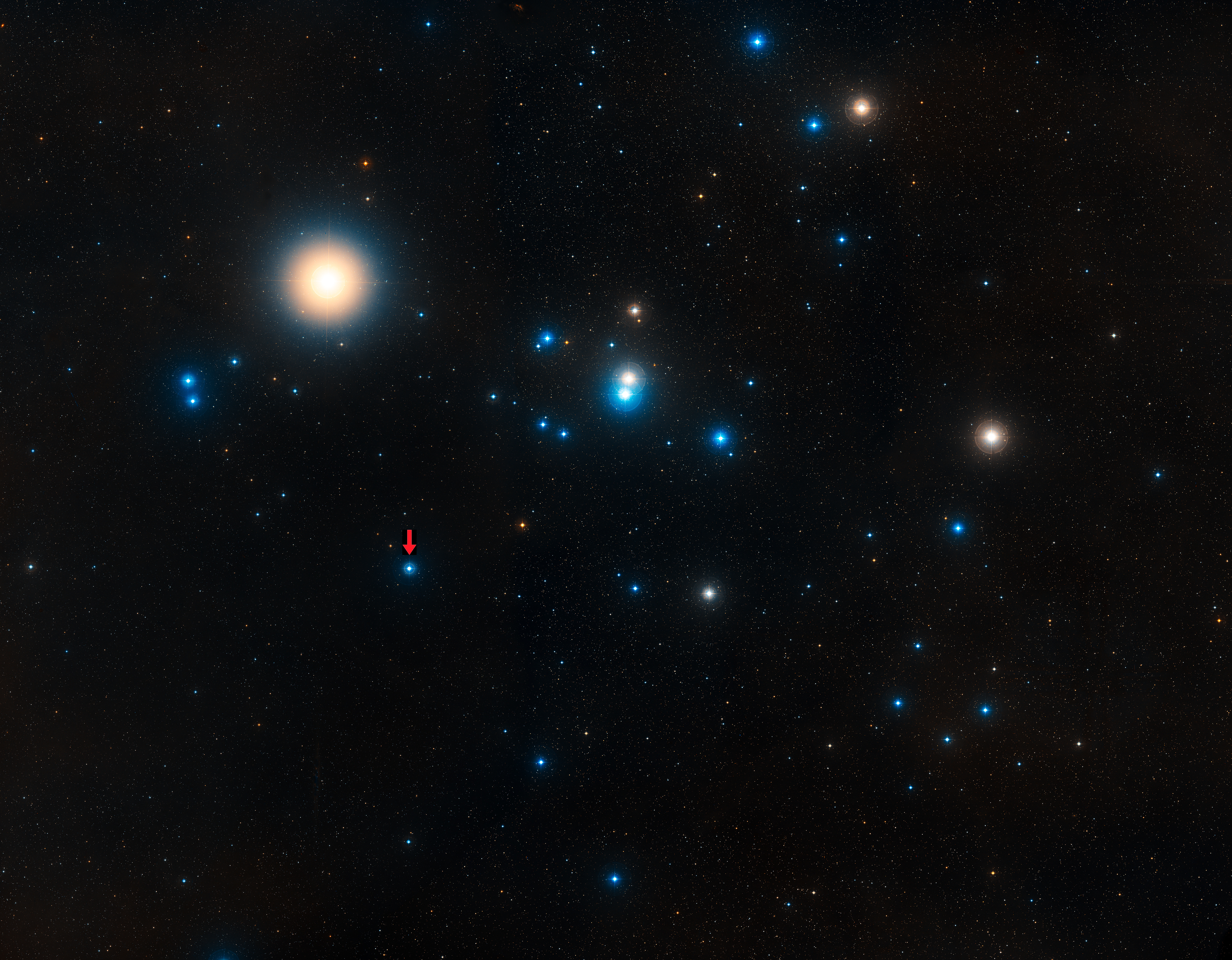
Hyades, with ρ Tau appearing blue, left of center, marked with a red arrow

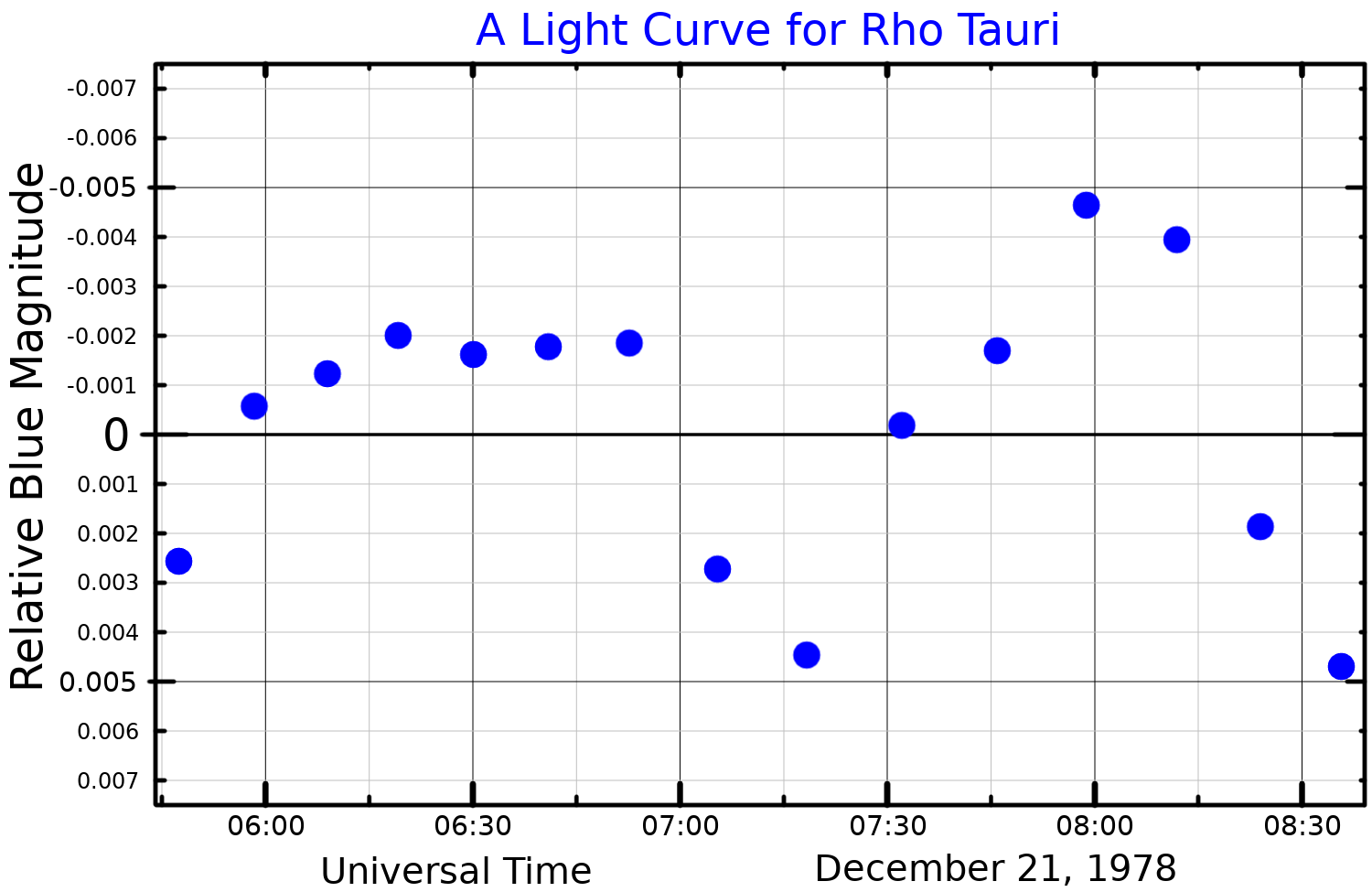
A blue band light curve for Rho Tauri, adapted from Horan (1979)
