= Nu Tauri =

Star in the constellation Taurus

- Location of ν Tauri (circled)

Observation data Epoch J2000 Equinox ICRS
- Constellation: Taurus
- Right ascension: 04^{h} 03^{m} 09.37966^{s}
- Declination: +05° 59′ 21.4792″
- Apparent magnitude (V): 3.91

Characteristics
- Evolutionary stage: main sequence
- Spectral type: A0.5Va
- U−B color index: +0.06
- B−V color index: +0.03

Astrometry
Radial velocity (R_{v})	−5.7±0.9 km/s
Proper motion (μ)	RA: +4.72 mas/yr Dec.: −3.78 mas/yr
Parallax (π)	27.89±0.19 mas
Distance	116.9 ± 0.8 ly (35.9 ± 0.2 pc)
Absolute magnitude (M_{V})	1.14

Details
Mass	2.25±0.01 M_{☉}
Radius	2.87+0.16 −0.31 R_{☉}
Luminosity	28.1±0.4 L_{☉}
Surface gravity (log g)	4.02 cgs
Temperature	7,836+464 −203 K
Metallicity [Fe/H]	−0.19±0.08 dex
Rotational velocity (v sin i)	83 km/s
Age	206 Myr

Other designations
- ν Ser, 38 Tauri, BD+05°581, FK5 151, GC 4862, HD 25490, HIP 18907, HR 1251, SAO 111579, WDS J04032+0559A, GSC 00079-01585

Database references
SIMBAD	data

ν Tauri, Latinized as Nu Tauri, is a single star in the zodiac constellation of Taurus. It is a white-hued star and is visible to the naked eye with an apparent visual magnitude of +3.91. This object is located 117 light years from the Sun based on parallax, but is drifting closer with a radial velocity of −6 km/s. It is predicted to come to within roughly 18.4 ly of the Sun in around five million years.

This object is an A-type main-sequence star with a stellar classification of A0.5Va. It is 206 million years old and is rotating with a projected rotational velocity of 83 km/s. The star has 2.25 times the mass of the Sun and 2.87 times the Sun's radius. It is radiating 28 times the luminosity of the Sun from its photosphere at an effective temperature of 7,836 K.

Nu Tauri has a magnitude 9.21 visual companion at an angular separation 15.9″.
