= 136 Tauri =

Star in the constellation Taurus

- Location of 136 Tauri (circled)

Observation data Epoch J2000 Equinox ICRS
- Constellation: Taurus
- Right ascension: 05^{h} 53^{m} 19.64606^{s}
- Declination: +27° 36′ 44.1378″
- Apparent magnitude (V): 4.56

Characteristics
- Spectral type: A0 V (A0 V + A0 V)
- B−V color index: −0.008±0.009
- Variable type: suspected

Astrometry
Radial velocity (R_{v})	−17.2±4.2 km/s
Proper motion (μ)	RA: +3.72 mas/yr Dec.: −10.11 mas/yr
Parallax (π)	7.71±0.22 mas
Distance	420 ± 10 ly (130 ± 4 pc)
Absolute magnitude (M_{V})	−1.00

Orbit
Period (P)	5.969 d
Eccentricity (e)	0.00
Periastron epoch (T)	2,420,147.25±10.0 JD
Argument of periastron (ω) (secondary)	0.00°
Semi-amplitude (K_{1}) (primary)	48.9 km/s
Semi-amplitude (K_{2}) (secondary)	71.0 km/s

Details

136 Tau A
Radius	2.1 R_{☉}
Luminosity	197.19 L_{☉}
Temperature	8,732 K
Rotational velocity (v sin i)	10 km/s

Other designations
- 136 Tau, BD+27°899, HD 39357, HIP 27830, HR 2034, SAO 77675

Database references
SIMBAD	data

136 Tauri is a white-hued binary star system in the zodiac constellation of Taurus. It has a combined apparent visual magnitude of 4.56, which is bright enough to be faintly visible to the naked eye. Based upon an annual parallax shift of 7.71±0.22 mas as seen from Earth's orbit, it is located approximately 420 light years from the Sun. The system is moving nearer with a heliocentric radial velocity of −17.2 km/s, and is expected to make its closest approach in 6.5 million years at a distance of 150 ly (45 pc).

This is a close, double-lined spectroscopic binary with an orbital period of 5.96 days and an eccentricity of 0.00. Tidal effects between the pair may have circularized their orbit and slowed their rotation rates – the primary has a projected rotational velocity of 10 km/s. They have a combined stellar classification of A0 V, and both are most likely A-type main-sequence stars of the same class.
