= HD 24040 =

G-type star in the constellation Taurus

Observation data Epoch J2000.0 Equinox ICRS
- Constellation: Taurus
- Right ascension: 03^{h} 50^{m} 22.9678^{s}
- Declination: +17° 28′ 34.925″
- Apparent magnitude (V): 7.50

Characteristics
- Evolutionary stage: subgiant
- Spectral type: G2V
- B−V color index: 0.653±0.003

Astrometry
Radial velocity (R_{v})	−9.36±0.08 km/s
Proper motion (μ)	RA: 113.433 mas/yr Dec.: −251.101 mas/yr
Parallax (π)	21.4719±0.0241 mas
Distance	151.9 ± 0.2 ly (46.57 ± 0.05 pc)
Absolute magnitude (M_{V})	4.16

Details
Mass	1.220+0.060 −0.061 M_{☉}
Radius	1.35 R_{☉}
Luminosity	1.79 L_{☉}
Surface gravity (log g)	4.24 cgs
Temperature	5,756 K
Metallicity [Fe/H]	0.13 dex
Rotational velocity (v sin i)	2.39±0.050 km/s
Age	4.8±0.8 Gyr

Other designations
- BD+17°638, HD 24040, HIP 17960, SAO 93630, LTT 11274, NLTT 11955

Database references
SIMBAD	data

HD 24040 is a star with two orbiting exoplanets in the equatorial constellation of Taurus. The star is too faint to be viewed with the naked eye, having an apparent visual magnitude of 7.50. Based on parallax measurements, it is located at a distance of 152 light years. However, it is drifting closer to the Sun with a radial velocity of −9.4 km/s.

This is a G-type main-sequence star with a stellar classification of G2V. It is a metal-rich star with an age of around 4.8 billion years. The star has 14% more mass than the Sun and 135% of the Sun's radius. It is radiating 1.8 times the luminosity of the Sun from its photosphere at an effective temperature of 5,756 K. The star is spinning slowly with a projected rotational velocity of 2.4 km/s.

== Planetary system ==
A long period planet was discovered in 2006 based on observations made at the W. M. Keck Observatory in Hawaii. However, because the observations covered less than one complete orbit there were only weak constraints on the period and mass. The first reliable orbit for HD 24040b was obtained by astronomers at Haute-Provence Observatory in 2012 who combined the keck measurements with ones from the SOPHIE and ELODIE spectrographs. The most recent orbit published in 2015 added additional keck measurements and refined the orbital parameters.

A linear trend in the radial velocities indicating a possible additional companion was detected at Haute-Provence Observatory and was also detected at keck but at a much smaller amplitude. The linear trend was confirmed in 2021, together with the discovery of another planet, HD 24040 c.

In 2025, the use of astrometry allowed the inclination and true mass of planet b to be found. The inclination is likely edge-on, implying a minimum mass very close to the real one.

The HD 24040 planetary system
Companion (in order from star)	Mass	Semimajor axis (AU)	Orbital period (days)	Eccentricity	Inclination (°)	Radius
c	≥0.201±0.027 M_{J}	1.3±0.021	515.4^{+2.2}_{−2.5}	0.11^{+0.120}_{−0.079}	—	—
b	5.00+0.36 −0.26 M_{J}	4.817+0.079 −0.083	3485±15	0.046+0.025 −0.026	89+20 −19	—

== See also ==
- HD 154345
- List of extrasolar planets
