= HD 32963 =

G-type star with a Jupiter-like exoplanet

Observation data Epoch J2000 Equinox ICRS
- Constellation: Taurus
- Right ascension: 05^{h} 07^{m} 55.76408^{s}
- Declination: +26° 19′ 40.6750″
- Apparent magnitude (V): 7.60

Characteristics
- Spectral type: G3V or G5IV
- B−V color index: 0.6

Astrometry
Radial velocity (R_{v})	−62.49±0.12 km/s
Proper motion (μ)	RA: −69.896 mas/yr Dec.: −66.118 mas/yr
Parallax (π)	26.1310±0.0238 mas
Distance	124.8 ± 0.1 ly (38.27 ± 0.03 pc)
Absolute magnitude (M_{V})	+4.80

Details
Mass	1.03±0.05 M_{☉}
Radius	1.1 R_{☉}
Luminosity	1.1 L_{☉}
Surface gravity (log g)	4.41±0.03 cgs
Temperature	5,727±32 K
Metallicity [Fe/H]	0.11±0.05 dex
Rotational velocity (v sin i)	1.10 km/s
Age	4.99+6.71 −3.55 Gyr

Other designations
- BD+26 789, HD 32963, HIP 23884, SAO 76970, PPM 94086

Database references
SIMBAD	data
Exoplanet Archive	data

HD 32963 is a G-type main sequence star located 124 light years away from Earth in the constellation of Taurus. It has a mass of 0.94 solar masses. It is 4.99 billion years old. It has one exoplanet orbiting it which was discovered using radial velocity. The exoplanet that has been named HD 32963 b is a Jupiter analogue due to its similar characteristics to the planet Jupiter such as orbit and size.

== Planetary system ==
It has one currently discovered exoplanet orbiting it, named HD 32963 b. The planet orbits the star at a distance of 3.41 AU with an eccentricity of 0.07. It takes 2372 days to orbit the parent star. It has a minimum mass of 0.7 Jupiter masses; in 2023 its inclination was measured by astrometry, showing it to have a true mass about twice that of Jupiter. The orbit and size of HD 32963 b is similar to the planet Jupiter. This makes it a Jupiter analogue planet.

The HD 32963 planetary system
Companion (in order from star)	Mass	Semimajor axis (AU)	Orbital period (years)	Eccentricity	Inclination (°)	Radius
b	2.07+0.83 −0.64 M_{J}	3.409+0.063 −0.064	6.483+0.064 −0.061	0.099±0.028	19.3+9.2 −5.7 or 160.7+5.7 −9.2	—
