= 139 Tauri =

Star in the constellation Taurus

- Location of 139 Tauri (circled in red)

Observation data Epoch J2000 Equinox J2000
- Constellation: Taurus
- Right ascension: 05^{h} 57^{m} 59.65632^{s}
- Declination: +25° 57′ 14.0799″
- Apparent magnitude (V): 4.81

Characteristics
- Spectral type: B1 Ib or B0.5 II
- B−V color index: −0.088±0.003

Astrometry
Radial velocity (R_{v})	+8.0±4.2 km/s
Proper motion (μ)	RA: −2.06 mas/yr Dec.: −1.95 mas/yr
Parallax (π)	2.10±0.19 mas
Distance	1,600 ± 100 ly (480 ± 40 pc)
Absolute magnitude (M_{V})	−4.4

Details
Mass	10.1±1.0 M_{☉}
Radius	20.7 R_{☉}
Luminosity	81,000 L_{☉}
Surface gravity (log g)	3.559±0.059 cgs
Temperature	24,660±1,620 K
Rotational velocity (v sin i)	140 km/s
Age	22.5±2.6 Myr

Other designations
- 139 Tau, BD+25°1052, HD 40111, HIP 28237, HR 2084, SAO 77775

Database references
SIMBAD	data

139 Tauri is a single, blue-white hued star in the zodiac constellation of Taurus. It is faintly visible to the naked eye with an apparent visual magnitude of 4.81. The distance to this star, as determined from an annual parallax shift of 2.10±0.19 mas, is roughly 1,600 light years. Because this star is located near the ecliptic, it is subject to occultations by the Moon. One such event was observed April 28, 1990.

This is a massive B-type lower-luminosity supergiant or bright giant star with a stellar classification of B1 Ib or B0.5 II, respectively. It is around 22.5 million years old with a high rate of spin, showing a projected rotational velocity of 140 km/s. J. D. Rosendhal (1973) identified weak emission features associated with an asymmetric H-alpha absorption line, providing evidence of mass loss. The star has about 10 times the mass of the Sun and around 20 times the Sun's radius. It is radiating over 80,000 times the Sun's luminosity from its photosphere at an effective temperature of around 24,660 K. Stars such as this with 10 or more solar masses are expected to end their life by exploding as a Type II supernova.
