= HU Tauri =

Binary star in the constellation Taurus

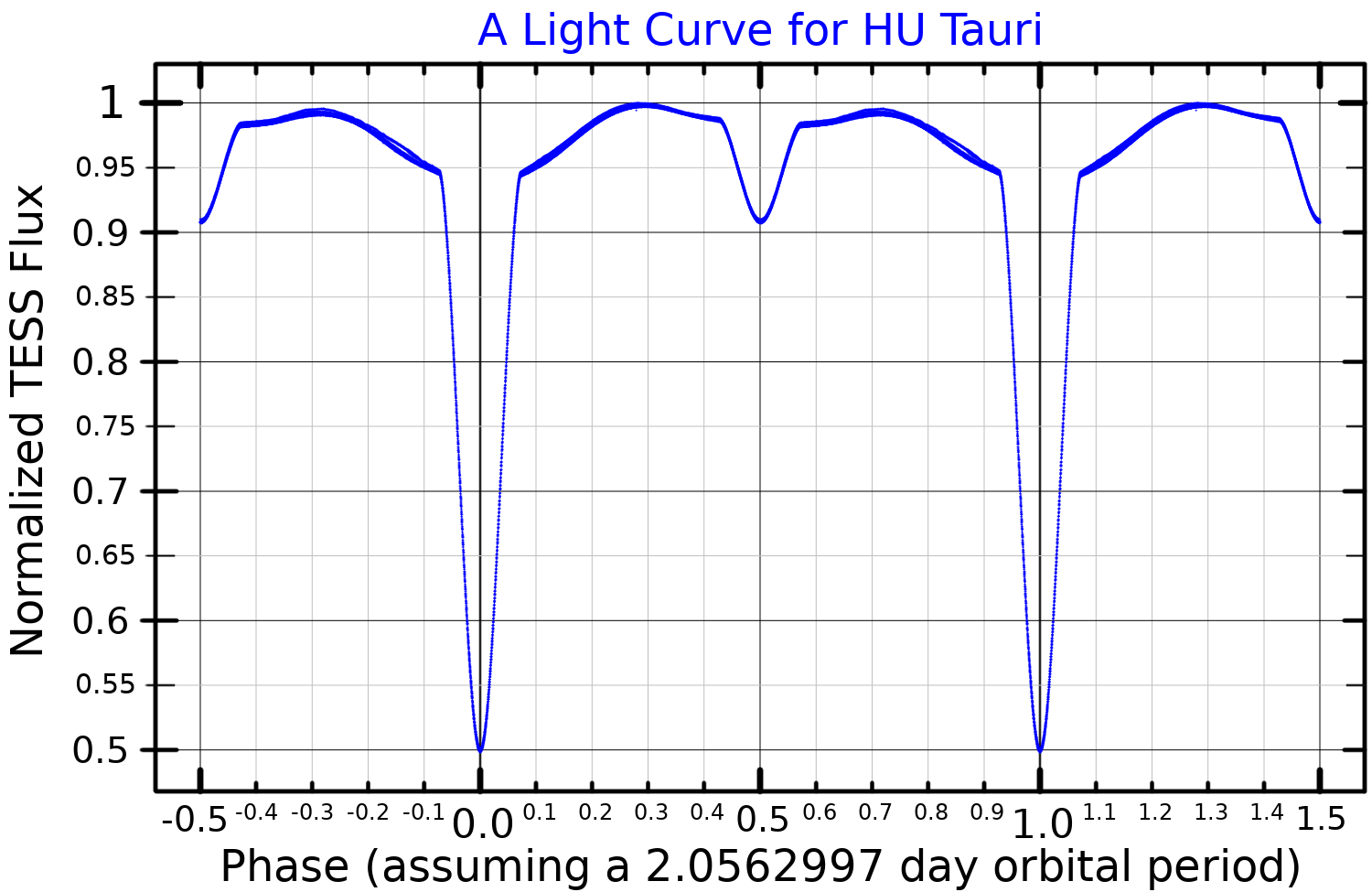
- A light curve for HU Tauri plotted from TESS data

Observation data Epoch J2000.0 Equinox ICRS
- Constellation: Taurus
- Right ascension: 04^{h} 38^{m} 15.830^{s}
- Declination: −19° 05′ 32.96″
- Apparent magnitude (V): 5.85

Characteristics
- Spectral type: B8V + G2IV
- B−V color index: −0.019±0.007
- Variable type: Semi-detached Algol variable

Astrometry
Radial velocity (R_{v})	−2.3±4.3 km/s
Proper motion (μ)	RA: −12.899 mas/yr Dec.: −7.198 mas/yr
Parallax (π)	7.8722±0.0466 mas
Distance	414 ± 2 ly (127.0 ± 0.8 pc)
Absolute magnitude (M_{V})	0.83

Orbit
Period (P)	2.0563056 d
Eccentricity (e)	0 (assumed)
Periastron epoch (T)	2,446,487.5 HJD
Semi-amplitude (K_{1}) (primary)	59.3±0.85 km/s
Semi-amplitude (K_{2}) (secondary)	231.2±2.2 km/s

Details

Primary
Mass	4.43±0.09 M_{☉}
Radius	2.57±0.03 R_{☉}
Luminosity	123 L_{☉}
Surface gravity (log g)	4.26±0.014 cgs
Temperature	12,000±1,000 K
Rotational velocity (v sin i)	80 km/s

Secondary
Mass	1.14±0.03 M_{☉}
Radius	4.21±0.03 R_{☉}
Luminosity	8.3 L_{☉}
Surface gravity (log g)	3.48±0.014 cgs
Temperature	5,740±150 K

Other designations
- HU Tau, BD+20°785, FK5 2341, GC 5644, HD 29365, HIP 21604, HR 1471, SAO 76680, PPM 93646, BV 312

Database references
SIMBAD	data

HU Tauri is a tight binary star system in the equatorial constellation of Taurus. It is an eclipsing binary, which means that the member stars periodically eclipse each other every 2.056 days. They have a combined apparent visual magnitude of 5.85, which is bright enough to be dimly visible to the naked eye. During the primary eclipse, the magnitude drops to 6.68, while the secondary eclipse decreases the magnitude to 5.91. The distance to this system, based on parallax measurements, is approximately 414 light years.

The variable nature of this system was reported by W. Strohmeier and R. Knigge in 1960. In 1963, Strohmeier found a period of 2.056297 days, and A. Mammano and associates derived orbital elements for a single-lined spectroscopic binary in 1967. A light curve for the system was assembled by O. Tümer and M. Kurutaç in 1979. M. Parthasarathy and M. B. K. Sarma in 1980 noted asymmetries in the light curve near the primary eclipse, which suggested gas streams are partially obscuring the light from the primary component.

This is a semidetached binary system with an orbital period of 2.0563056 days in an essentially circular orbit. The primary component is presently a B-type main-sequence star with a stellar classification of B8V. It has 4.4 times the mass and 2.6 times the radius of the Sun. The primary eclipse is an occultation in which the secondary completely covers the primary. The cooler and larger secondary star is over-luminous for its mass, indicating that it has evolved away from the main sequence, and is filling its Roche lobe. The spectrum of the system suggests that the secondary is undergoing mass loss, with a gas stream transferring matter to the primary.
