= 6 Tauri =

Star in the constellation Taurus

Observation data Epoch J2000 Equinox ICRS
- Constellation: Taurus
- Right ascension: 03^{h} 32^{m} 35.943^{s}
- Declination: +09° 22′ 24.42″
- Apparent magnitude (V): 5.757

Characteristics
- Evolutionary stage: main sequence
- Spectral type: B9III (kB8HeB9.5V(HgMn))
- U−B color index: −0.29
- B−V color index: −0.08

Astrometry
Radial velocity (R_{v})	+11.40 km/s
Proper motion (μ)	RA: +30.327 mas/yr Dec.: −48.036 mas/yr
Parallax (π)	8.9915±0.0866 mas
Distance	363 ± 3 ly (111 ± 1 pc)

Details
Mass	2.8 M_{☉}
Radius	2.5 R_{☉}
Luminosity	79 L_{☉}
Surface gravity (log g)	4.13 cgs
Temperature	10,963 K
Metallicity [Fe/H]	+0.64 dex
Rotational velocity (v sin i)	87.60 km/s
Age	224 Myr

Other designations
- t Tau, 6 Tau, BD+08°528, HD 21933, HIP 16511, HR 1079, SAO 111246

Database references
SIMBAD	data

6 Tauri, also designated t Tauri, is a chemically peculiar star in the northern constellation of Taurus. It has an apparent visual magnitude of 5.8, so, according to the Bortle scale, it is faintly visible from suburban skies at night. Measurements made with the Gaia spacecraft show an annual parallax shift of 9.0 mas, which is equivalent to a distance of around 363 light years from the Sun.

A stellar classification of B9III matches that of a B-type giant star, but a more detailed analysis gives a type of kB8HeB9.5V(HgMn), indicating a main sequence mercury-manganese star. Mercury-manganese stars are chemically peculiar stars with a specific over-abundance of mercury and manganese absorption lines in their spectra.

6 Tauri has a mass 2.8 times that of the Sun and a radius 2.5 times the Sun's. With an effective temperature of 10,963 K, it shines with a bolometric luminosity of 79 L_{☉}. Evolutionary models indicate that it is still on the main sequence with an age of 224 million years.
