= 47 Tauri =

Star in the constellation Taurus

- Location of 47 Tauri (circled in red)

Observation data Epoch J2000 Equinox ICRS
- Constellation: Taurus
- Right ascension: 04^{h} 13^{m} 56.38482^{s}
- Declination: +09° 15′ 49.7729″
- Apparent magnitude (V): 4.89 (5.05 + 7.32)

Characteristics
- Spectral type: G5III + A7V:
- U−B color index: +0.46
- B−V color index: +0.82

Astrometry
Radial velocity (R_{v})	-8.2 ± 0.4 km/s
Proper motion (μ)	RA: -10.31 mas/yr Dec.: -30.01 mas/yr
Parallax (π)	9.83±0.64 mas
Distance	330 ± 20 ly (102 ± 7 pc)

Orbit
Period (P)	479 yr
Semi-major axis (a)	1.053″
Eccentricity (e)	0.910
Inclination (i)	128.6°
Longitude of the node (Ω)	52.9°
Periastron epoch (T)	B 1816.6
Argument of periastron (ω) (secondary)	263.0°

Details

47 Tau A
Radius	12.9 R_{☉}
Surface gravity (log g)	2.67 ± 0.11 cgs
Temperature	5117 ± 58 K
Metallicity [Fe/H]	-0.10 ± 0.08 dex

Other designations
- BD+08°652, HD 26722, HIP 19740, HR 1311, SAO 111674

Database references
SIMBAD	47 Tau
- 47 Tau A
- 47 Tau B

47 Tauri (abbreviated to 47 Tau) is a binary star in the zodiac constellation of Taurus. Parallax measurements made by the Hipparcos spacecraft put it at a distance of about 330 light-years (102 parsecs) from Earth. The system has a combined apparent magnitude of about 4.89, meaning it can be faintly seen with the naked eye, according to the Bortle scale.

47 Tauri is a visual binary, meaning that the two components can be resolved, and the orbit is derived from the positions of the two stars. The primary component is a G-type giant. Its radius is about 13 times that of the Sun. The companion is likely a white-colored A-type main-sequence star that is fainter. The two stars are separated about 1.3 arcseconds away, and because of their large separation, the two stars take some 479 years to complete an orbit.
