= HD 24040 b =

Long-period exoplanet orbiting 24040 b

Discovery
- Discovered by: Butler et al.
- Discovery site: California, USA
- Discovery date: March 12, 2006
- Detection method: Doppler spectroscopy

Orbital characteristics
- Semi-major axis: 4.637±0.067 AU
- Eccentricity: 0.047±0.020
- Orbital period (sidereal): 3490±25 d
- Time of periastron: 2456670±240
- Argument of periastron: 67±24
- Semi-amplitude: 51.8±1.6
- Star: HD 24040

Physical characteristics
- Mass: >4 M_{J}

HD 24040 b is a long-period exoplanet taking approximately 3500 days to orbit at 4.6 astronomical units in an almost circular orbit. It has a minimum mass 4 times that of Jupiter.

== Discovery ==
HD 24040b was discovered in 2006 based on observations made at the W. M. Keck Observatory in Hawaii. However, because the observations covered less than one complete orbit there were only weak constraints on the period and mass. The first reliable orbit for HD 24040b was obtained by astronomers at Haute-Provence Observatory in 2012 who combined the keck measurements with ones from the SOPHIE and ELODIE spectrographs. The most recent orbit published in 2015 added additional Keck measurements and refined the orbital parameters.
