= 79 Tauri =

Star in the constellation Taurus

- Location of 79 Tauri (circled)

Observation data Epoch J2000 Equinox ICRS
- Constellation: Taurus
- Right ascension: 04^{h} 28^{m} 50.1636^{s}
- Declination: +13° 02′ 51.367″
- Apparent magnitude (V): 5.014

Characteristics
- Evolutionary stage: main sequence
- Spectral type: kA5hF0VmF0
- U−B color index: +0.12
- B−V color index: +0.23

Astrometry
Radial velocity (R_{v})	+33.7276±0.0324 km/s
Proper motion (μ)	RA: +104.066 mas/yr Dec.: −14.900 mas/yr
Parallax (π)	20.7158±0.0899 mas
Distance	157.4 ± 0.7 ly (48.3 ± 0.2 pc)
Absolute magnitude (M_{V})	1.58

Details
Mass	1.9 M_{☉}
Radius	2.4 R_{☉}
Luminosity	18 L_{☉}
Surface gravity (log g)	3.88 cgs
Temperature	7,681 K
Metallicity [Fe/H]	+0.35 dex
Rotation	0.925 d
Rotational velocity (v sin i)	106.3 km/s
Age	971 Myr

Other designations
- b Tau, BD+12°598, HD 28355, HIP 20901, HR 1414, SAO 93960

Database references
SIMBAD	data

79 Tauri, also known as b Tauri, is an Am star in the constellation of Taurus with an apparent magnitude of 5.0. It is a member of the Hyades open cluster and parallax measurements by Gaia give a distance of about 157 light years.

The spectrum of 79 Tauri shows abnormal abundances of metals, with many showing unusually strong absorption lines, but some such as calcium showing weaker lines than expected. This is represented in the spectral type kA5hF0VmF0, which is F0 based on its hydrogen lines, but A5 based on its calcium K-lines, and F0 based on the lines of other metals. Other publications often give the spectral class based on hydrogen lines as A7. It is classified as an Am star, a type of star with strong magnetic fields and slow rotation causing stratification of elements within its atmosphere.

79 Tauri lies about two degrees south of the main V asterism of the Hyades open cluster. It lies 11 light years from the centre of the cluster and is generally considered to be a member. With a mass of 1.9 M_{☉}, it is a main sequence star with an age of 971 million years. It has an effective temperature of 7,681 K and a radius of 2.4 R_{☉}, it radiates 18 times the luminosity of the Sun.
