= Sigma2 Tauri =

Star in the constellation Taurus

- Location of σ^{2} Tauri (circled)

Observation data Epoch J2000.0 Equinox J2000.0 (ICRS)
- Constellation: Taurus
- Right ascension: 04^{h} 39^{m} 16.50230^{s}
- Declination: +15° 55′ 04.7029″
- Apparent magnitude (V): 4.70

Characteristics
- Evolutionary stage: main sequence
- Spectral type: A5 Vn
- U−B color index: +0.13
- B−V color index: +0.14

Astrometry
Radial velocity (R_{v})	+40.8±1.2 km/s
Proper motion (μ)	RA: +83.17 mas/yr Dec.: −20.97 mas/yr
Parallax (π)	20.97±0.27 mas
Distance	156 ± 2 ly (47.7 ± 0.6 pc)
Absolute magnitude (M_{V})	+1.28

Details
Mass	1.71 M_{☉}
Radius	1.9 R_{☉}
Luminosity	22.5 L_{☉}
Surface gravity (log g)	3.96 cgs
Temperature	8,165±278 K
Metallicity [Fe/H]	0.10±0.11 dex
Rotational velocity (v sin i)	128 km/s
Age	258 Myr

Other designations
- 92 Tauri, BD+15°666, FK5 2345, HD 29488, HIP 21683, HR 1479, SAO 94054, WDS J04393+1555A

Database references
SIMBAD	data

Sigma^{2} Tauri (σ^{2} Tauri) is the Bayer designation for a white-hued star in the zodiac constellation of Taurus. It has an apparent visual magnitude of +4.70, which indicates it is visible to the naked eye. Based upon parallax measurements, σ^{2} Tauri is about 156 light-years distant.

σ^{2} Tauri is a solitary A-type main sequence star with a stellar classification of A5 Vn. The 'n' suffix indicates the lines are "nebulous" due to rapid rotation, and indeed it is spinning with a projected rotational velocity of 128 km/s. The star is an estimated 258 million years old, with 1.7 times the mass of the Sun. It is radiating 22.5 times the Sun's luminosity from its photosphere at an effective temperature of around 8,165 K. The star is considered a member of the Hyades cluster.

In Chinese astronomy, σ^{2} Tauri is called 附耳, Pinyin: Fùěr, meaning Whisper, because this star is marking itself and stands alone in the Whisper asterism of the Net mansion (see: Chinese constellation).
