= Sigma1 Tauri =

Star in the constellation Taurus

- Location of σ^{1} Tauri (circled)

Observation data Epoch J2000.0 Equinox J2000.0 (ICRS)
- Constellation: Taurus
- Right ascension: 04^{h} 39^{m} 09.22247^{s}
- Declination: +15° 47′ 59.5345″
- Apparent magnitude (V): 5.07

Characteristics
- Spectral type: A4m
- U−B color index: 0.190
- B−V color index: 0.146

Astrometry
Radial velocity (R_{v})	+26.1±10.0 km/s
Proper motion (μ)	RA: +41.91 mas/yr Dec.: −66.88 mas/yr
Parallax (π)	22.18±0.93 mas
Distance	147 ± 6 ly (45 ± 2 pc)
Absolute magnitude (M_{V})	1.73

Orbit
Primary	σ^{1} Tau A
Name	σ^{1} Tau B
Period (P)	38.951 d
Eccentricity (e)	0.15
Longitude of the node (Ω)	82°
Periastron epoch (T)	2443094.319 JD
Semi-amplitude (K_{1}) (primary)	7.9 km/s

Details
Mass	1.94 M_{☉}
Luminosity	14.7 L_{☉}
Surface gravity (log g)	4.08 cgs
Temperature	8,470 K
Rotational velocity (v sin i)	56.5±7.1 km/s

Other designations
- 91 Tauri, BD+15°665, HD 29479, HIP 21673, HR 1478, SAO 94051, WDS J04393+1555B

Database references
SIMBAD	data

Sigma^{1} Tauri (σ^{1} Tauri) is the Bayer designation for a white-hued star in the zodiac constellation of Taurus. It has an apparent visual magnitude of +5.07, which indicates it is visible to the naked eye. Based upon parallax measurements, σ^{1} Tauri is about 147 light-years from the Sun.

σ^{1} Tauri is a single-lined spectroscopic binary star system with an orbital period of 38.951 days and an eccentricity of 0.15. The visible component is an Am star with a stellar classification of A4m, indicating it is chemically peculiar A-type star. It is spinning with a projected rotational velocity of 56.5 km/s. The star has 1.9 times the mass of the Sun and is radiating 14.7 times the Sun's luminosity from its photosphere at an effective temperature of 8,470 K. Although it lies in the general direction of the Hyades cluster, based on parallax measurements it has been excluded from the list of candidate members.
