= Theta Tauri =

Binary star in the constellation Taurus

θ Tauri
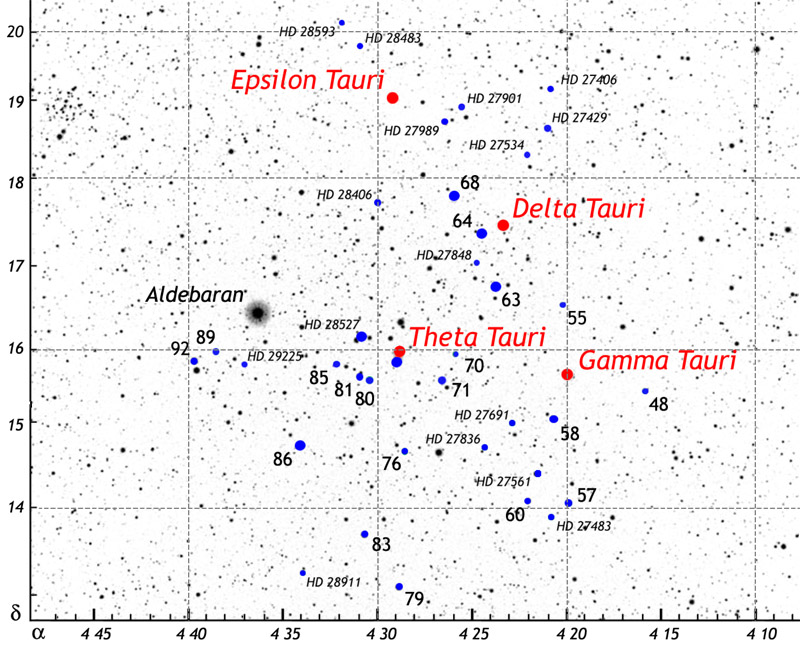
- Hyades showing θ Tauri

Observation data Epoch J2000.0 Equinox ICRS
- Constellation: Taurus
- θ^{1} Tauri
- Right ascension: 04^{h} 28^{m} 34.49209^{s}
- Declination: +15° 57′ 44.2832″
- Apparent magnitude (V): +3.84
- θ^{2} Tauri
- Right ascension: 04^{h} 28^{m} 39.74455^{s}
- Declination: +15° 52′ 15.1226″
- Apparent magnitude (V): +3.35 - 3.42

Characteristics

θ^{1} Tauri
- Spectral type: G9 III Fe-0.5

θ^{2} Tauri
- Spectral type: A7 III
- Variable type: δ Scuti

Astrometry

θ^{1} Tauri
Parallax (π)	21.4183±0.3731 mas
Distance	152 ± 3 ly (46.7 ± 0.8 pc)
Absolute magnitude (M_{V})	+0.416

θ^{2} Tauri
Parallax (π)	20.8354±0.3731 mas
Distance	157 ± 3 ly (48.0 ± 0.9 pc)
Absolute magnitude (M_{V})	+0.08

Orbit
Primary	A
Secondary	B
Period (P)	5,997 days
Eccentricity (e)	0.64
Semi-amplitude (K_{1}) (primary)	8.39 km/s

Orbit
Primary	Aa
Secondary	Ab
Period (P)	140.7302 days
Semi-major axis (a)	18.91″
Eccentricity (e)	0.7360
Inclination (i)	47.8°
Semi-amplitude (K_{1}) (primary)	32.95 km/s
Semi-amplitude (K_{2}) (secondary)	43.68 km/s

Details

Aa
Mass	2.86 M_{☉}
Radius	4.4 R_{☉}
Luminosity	59 L_{☉}
Surface gravity (log g)	3.6 cgs
Temperature	7,800 K
Rotational velocity (v sin i)	68.4 km/s

Ab
Mass	2.16 M_{☉}
Radius	2.7 R_{☉}
Luminosity	21 L_{☉}
Temperature	7,800 K
Rotational velocity (v sin i)	113 km/s
Age	650 Myr

θ^{1} Tauri
Mass	2.67 M_{☉}
Radius	9.42±0.22 R_{☉}
Luminosity	47.7±2.3 L_{☉}
Surface gravity (log g)	3.21 cgs
Temperature	4,940±55 K
Metallicity [Fe/H]	+0.14 dex
Rotational velocity (v sin i)	1.40 km/s
Age	510 Myr

Other designations
- θ Tauri
- θ^{1} Tauri: 77 Tauri, BD+15 631, HD 28307, HIP 20885, HR 1411, SAO 93955
- θ^{2} Tauri: Chamukuy, 78 Tauri, BD+15 632, HD 28319, HIP 20894, HR 1412, SAO 93957

Database references
SIMBAD	θ^{1} Tauri
- θ^{2} Tauri

Theta Tauri (θ Tauri, abbreviated Theta Tau, θ Tau) is a wide double star in the constellation of Taurus and a member of the Hyades open cluster.

θ Tauri is composed of two 3rd magnitude stars, designated Theta^{1} Tauri (Theta Tauri B) and Theta^{2} Tauri (Theta Tauri A). Theta² is brighter, hence the pair are sometimes referred to as Theta Tauri B and A, respectively. They are separated by 5.62 arcminutes (0.094°) on the sky. Based upon parallax measurements, Theta¹ Tauri is located at a distance of 152 ly (47 pc), while Theta² Tauri is at a distance of 157 light-years (48 parsecs). θ Tauri A and B are both spectroscopic binaries; the four components are designated Theta Tauri Aa (formally named Chamukuy /ˈtʃɑːmuːkuːi/), Ab, Ba, and Bb.

== Nomenclature ==
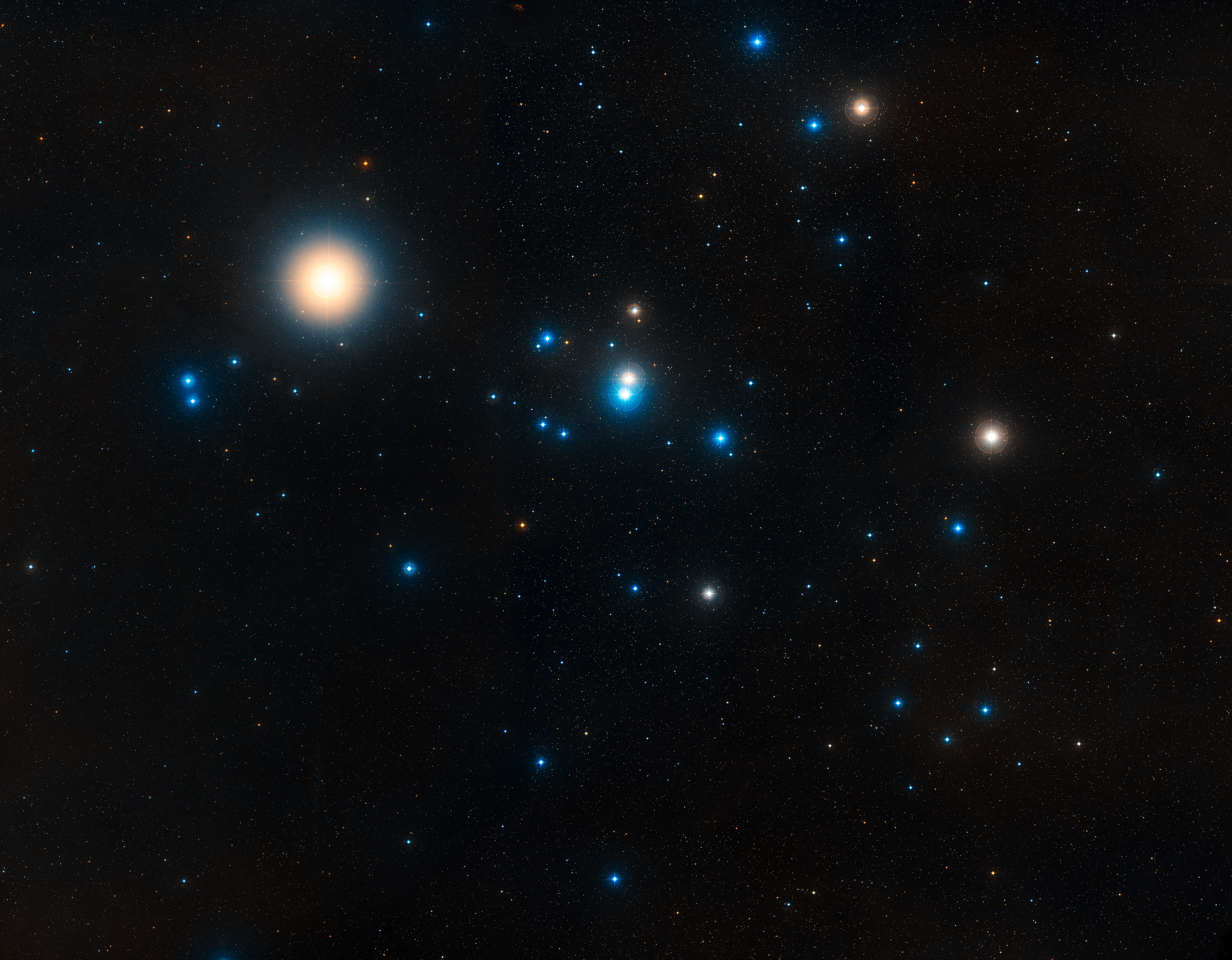
The θ Tauri pair, showing contrasting blue and yellow colors, in the Hyades cluster. In this image, θ^{1} Tauri is above in yellow, and θ^{2} Tauri is below in light blue.

θ Tauri (Latinised to Theta Tauri) is the double star's Bayer designation; θ^{1} Tauri and θ^{2} Tauri those of its two constituents. The designations of the two constituents as Theta Tauri A and B, and those of the four components - Theta Tauri Aa, Ab, Ba and Bb - derive from the convention used by the Washington Multiplicity Catalog (WMC) for multiple star systems, and adopted by the International Astronomical Union (IAU).

In the mythology of the Maya peoples, Theta Tauri is known as Chamukuy, meaning a small bird in the Yucatec Maya language. In 2016, the IAU organized a Working Group on Star Names (WGSN) to catalog and standardize proper names for stars. The WGSN decided to attribute proper names to individual stars rather than entire multiple systems. It approved the name Chamukuy for the component Theta Tauri Aa on 5 September 2017 and it is now so included in the List of IAU-approved Star Names.

In Chinese, 畢宿 (Bì Xiù), meaning Net, refers to an asterism consisting of Theta² Tauri, Epsilon Tauri (named Ain), Delta³ Tauri, Delta¹ Tauri, Gamma Tauri, Alpha Tauri (Aldebaran), 71 Tauri and Lambda Tauri. Consequently, the Chinese name for Theta² Tauri itself is 畢宿六 (Bì Xiù liù), "the Sixth Star of Net".

== Properties ==
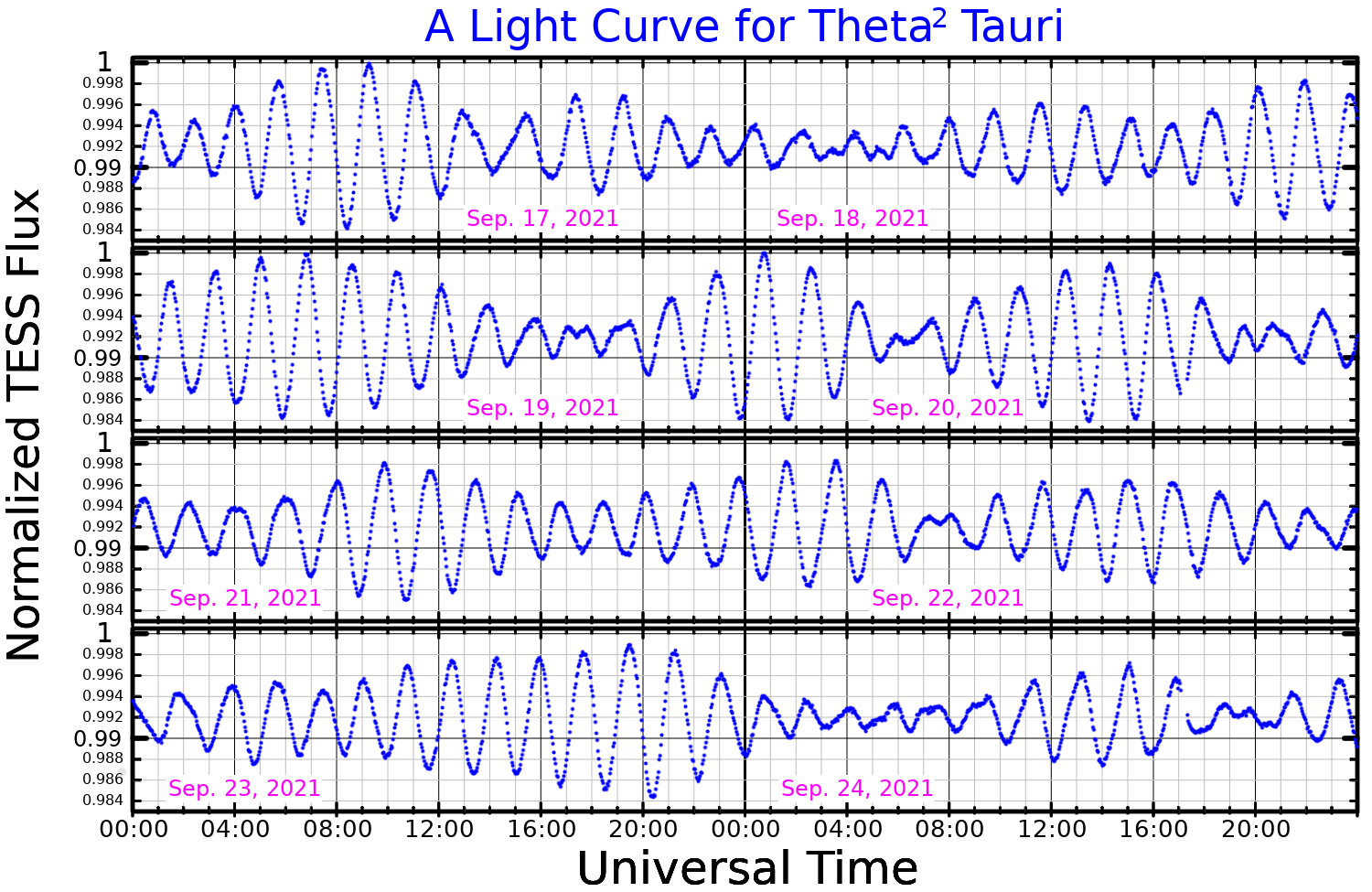
A light curve for Theta^{2} Tauri, plotted from TESS data

Theta Tauri A has a mean apparent magnitude of +3.40. It is classified as a Delta Scuti type variable star and its brightness varies from magnitude +3.35 to +3.42 with a period of 1.82 hours. Its primary component, Theta Tauri Aa, is a white A-type giant. The secondary, Theta Tauri Ab, is of the 6th magnitude and is 0.005 arcseconds, or at least 2 AU, distant. It completes an orbit once every 141 days.

Theta Tauri B is the dimmer constituent. Its primary component, Theta Tauri Ba, is an orange K-type giant with an apparent magnitude of +3.84. The secondary, Theta Tauri Bb, is of the 7th-magnitude. It has a mass of 1.31 M_{☉} and orbits the primary every 16.26 years on a fairly eccentric (at 0.570) orbit.
