= Golden Gate of the Ecliptic =

Two star clusters in the constellation Taurus marking the Sun's path in the night sky

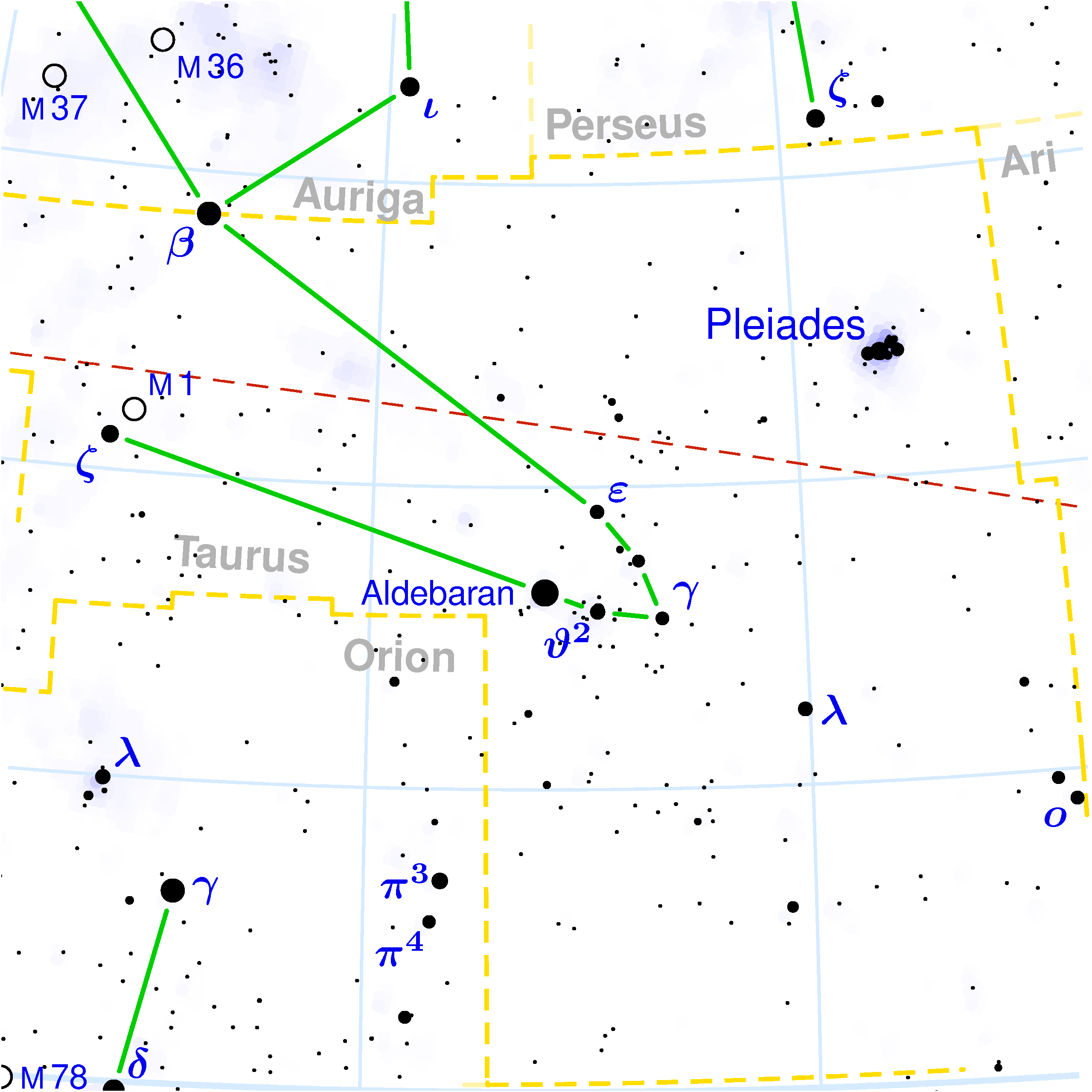
Star map with the Pleiades (upper right) and the Hyades (centre, V-shaped head of the constellation Taurus with its main star Aldebaran, γ Tauri and ε Tauri (Ain)) at both sides of the ecliptic line (dashed red).

The Golden Gate of the Ecliptic is an asterism in the constellation Taurus that has been known for several thousand years. The asterism is formed of the two eye-catching open star clusters, the Pleiades and the Hyades that form the posts of a virtual gate on either side of the ecliptic line.

Since all planets as well as the Moon and the Sun always move very closely along the virtual circle of the ecliptic, all these seven orbiting bodies regularly pass through the Golden Gate of the Ecliptic. Since the Moon is the closest of these heavenly bodies to the Earth and it is inclined at a high enough angle to the ecliptic, on some occasions, the Moon can cover the stars of the open star clusters or even pass outside the Gate.

== History ==
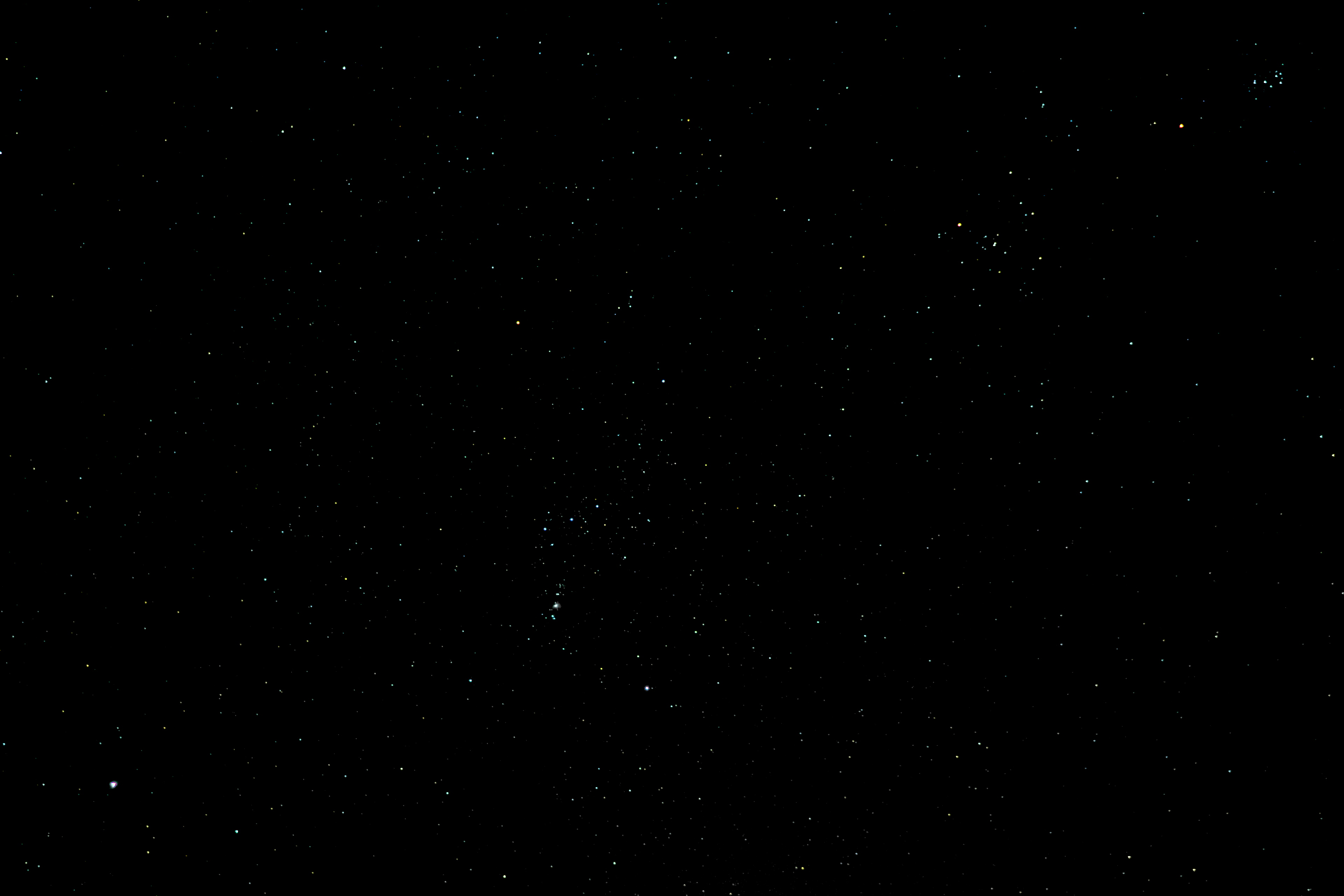
From lower left to upper right: Sirius (Canis majoris), constellation Orion, constellation Taurus with open star cluster Hyades, planet Mars exactly in the Golden Gate of the Ecliptic, open star cluster Pleiades.

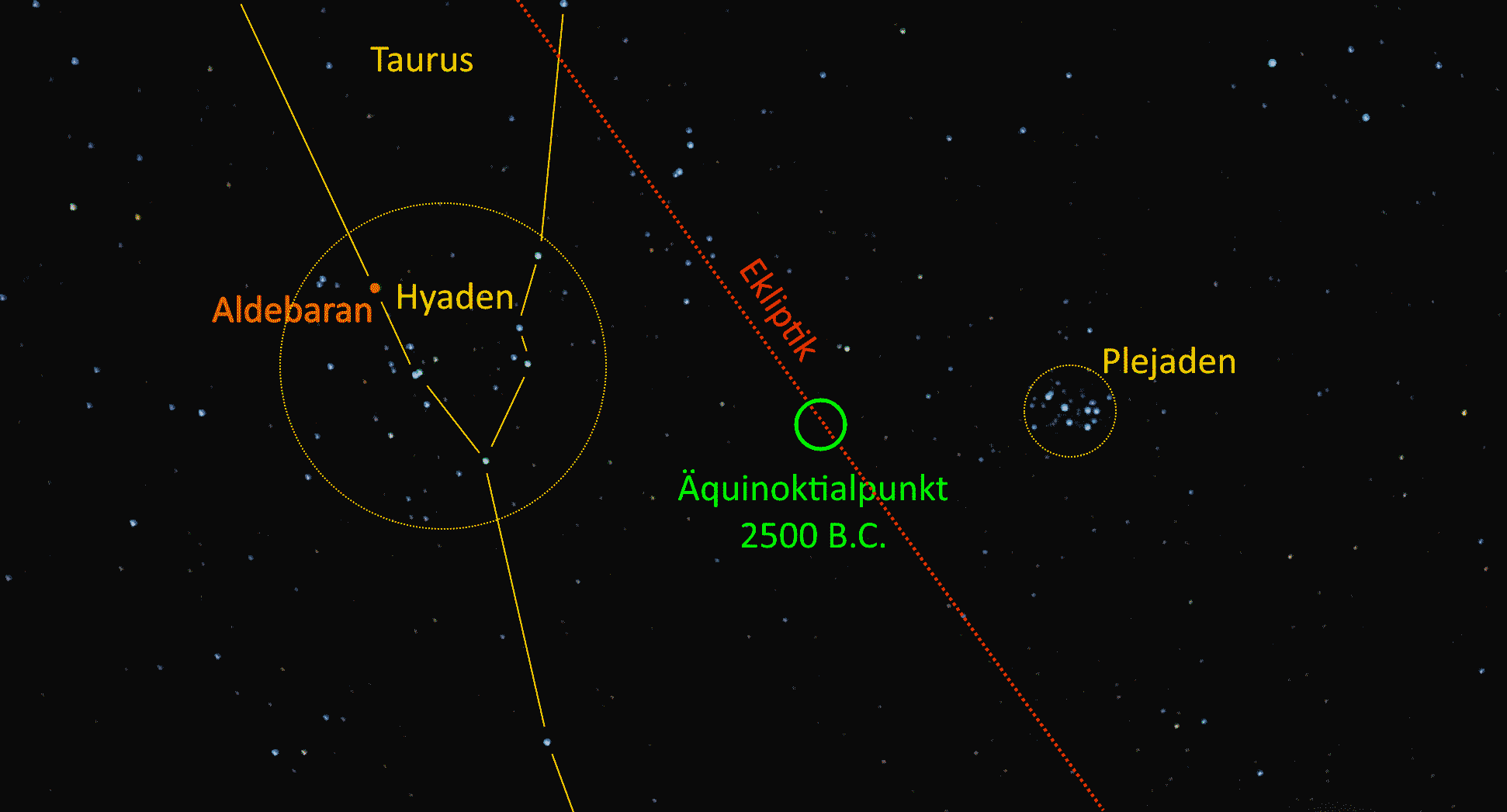
4,500 years ago the location of the equinox was in the middle of the Golden Gate of the Ecliptic.

From 4000 to 1500 BC the equinox was within the constellation Taurus, and therefore great importance was attached to this constellation. The 4500 year old sky tablet of the Neolithic Tal-Qadi Temple in Malta is thought to display the Golden Gate of the Ecliptic.

== Sources ==
- Rappenglück, Michael A. (2001). Barbieri, C.; Rampazzi, F. (eds.). Palaeolithic Timekeepers Looking at the Golden Gate of the Ecliptic; The Lunar Cycle and the Pleiades in the Cave of La-Tête-du-lion (Ardèche, France) — 21,000 BP. Earth-Moon Relationships. Dordrecht: Springer. pp. 391–404. doi:10.1007/978-94-010-0800-6_33.
