= Delta1 Tauri =

Binary star in the constellation Taurus

δ^{1} Tauri
- Location of δ^{1} Tauri (circled)

Observation data Epoch J2000.0 Equinox J2000.0 (ICRS)
- Constellation: Taurus
- Right ascension: 04^{h} 22^{m} 56.09253^{s}
- Declination: +17° 32′ 33.0487″
- Apparent magnitude (V): +3.772 (3.90 + 9.50)

Characteristics
- Evolutionary stage: red clump
- Spectral type: G9.5 III CN0.5
- U−B color index: +0.801
- B−V color index: +0.919

Astrometry
Proper motion (μ)	RA: +106.56 mas/yr Dec.: −29.18 mas/yr
Parallax (π)	20.96±0.58 mas
Distance	156 ± 4 ly (48 ± 1 pc)
Absolute magnitude (M_{V})	+0.41

Orbit
Period (P)	529.8 d
Eccentricity (e)	0.42
Periastron epoch (T)	2434356.5 JD
Argument of periastron (ω) (secondary)	335°
Semi-amplitude (K_{1}) (primary)	3.0 km/s

Details

δ^{1} Tau Aa
Mass	2.75 M_{☉}
Radius	14.9 R_{☉}
Luminosity	107 L_{☉}
Surface gravity (log g)	2.72 cgs
Temperature	4,819 K
Metallicity [Fe/H]	+0.11 dex
Rotation	148.2 d
Rotational velocity (v sin i)	2.31 km/s
Age	588 Myr

δ^{1} Tau Ab
Mass	1.28±0.1 M_{☉}

Other designations
- Hyadum II, δ^{1} Tau, 61 Tauri, BD+17°712, FK5 162, HD 27697, HIP 20455, HR 1373, SAO 93897

Database references
SIMBAD	data

Delta^{1} Tauri (δ^{1} Tauri, abbreviated Delta^{1} Tau, δ^{1} Tau) is a double star in the zodiac constellation of Taurus. Based upon an annual parallax shift of 20.96 mas as seen from Earth, it is located roughly 156 light-years distant from the Sun. The system is faintly visible to the naked eye with a combined apparent visual magnitude of +3.772. It is considered a member of the Hyades cluster.

The two constituents are designated δ^{1} Tauri A and B. A is itself a binary star with components designated δ^{1} Tauri Aa (officially named Secunda Hyadum /sɪˈkʌndə ˈhaɪədəm/, the traditional name for the entire system) and Ab.

== Nomenclature ==
δ^{1} Tauri (Latinised to Delta^{1} Tauri) is the system's Bayer designation. The designations of the two constituents as Delta^{1} Tauri A and B, and those of A's components - Delta^{1} Tauri Aa and Ab - derive from the convention used by the Washington Multiplicity Catalog (WMC) for multiple star systems, and adopted by the International Astronomical Union (IAU).

The system bore the traditional name Hyadum II, which is Latin for "Second of the Hyades". In 2016, the IAU organized a Working Group on Star Names (WGSN) to catalog and standardize proper names for stars. The WGSN decided to attribute proper names to individual stars rather than entire multiple systems. It approved the name Secunda Hyadum for the component Delta^{1} Tauri Aa on 5 September 2017 and it is now so included in the List of IAU-approved Star Names.

In Chinese, 畢宿 (Bì Xiù), meaning Net, refers to an asterism consisting of δ^{1} Tauri, Epsilon Tauri, Delta³ Tauri, Gamma Tauri, Alpha Tauri (Aldebaran), 71 Tauri and Lambda Tauri. Consequently, the Chinese name for Delta^{1} Tauri itself is 畢宿三 (Bì Xiù sān), "the Third Star of Net".

== Properties ==
Delta^{1} Tauri A is a single-lined spectroscopic binary with an orbital period of 529.8 days and an eccentricity of 0.42. The visible member, component Aa, is an evolved G- or K-type giant star with a stellar classification of G9.5 III CN0.5. The 'CN0.5' suffix indicates a mild overabundance of cyanogen in the outer atmosphere. It is chromospherically active and shows a radial velocity variation of 9.3±0.2 m/s with a period of 165±3 d. The primary, component Aa, has 2.75 times the mass of the Sun, while the secondary, component Ab, has 1.3 times the Sun's mass. The primary star, at an age of 588 million years, is just evolving away from the horizontal branch toward the asymptotic giant branch after exhausting its core helium.

Delta^{1} Tauri B is a magnitude 13.21 visual companion separated by 111.8 arcseconds from A. It is most likely not physically related to the main star.
