= Delta3 Tauri =

Star in the constellation Taurus

δ^{3} Tauri
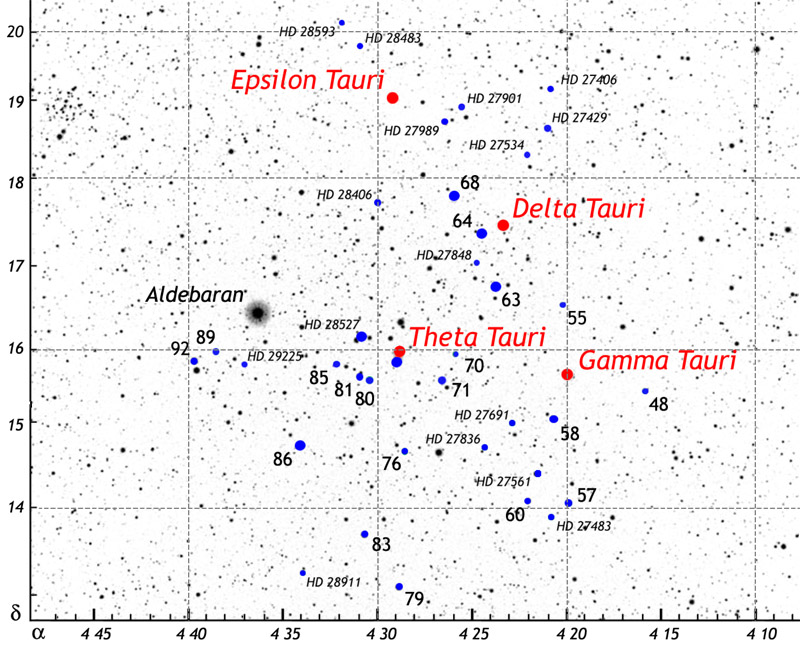
- Location of δ^{3} Tauri in the Hyades, indicated by its Flamsteed designation 68

Observation data Epoch J2000.0 Equinox J2000.0 (ICRS)
- Constellation: Taurus
- Right ascension: 04^{h} 25^{m} 29.38340^{s}
- Declination: +17° 55′ 40.4579″
- Apparent magnitude (V): +4.32 (4.35 + 8.37)

Characteristics
- Evolutionary stage: main sequence
- Spectral type: A2IV-Vs

Astrometry
Proper motion (μ)	RA: +41.91 mas/yr Dec.: −34.54 mas/yr
Parallax (π)	21.96±0.51 mas
Distance	149 ± 3 ly (46 ± 1 pc)
Absolute magnitude (M_{V})	+1.14

Details
Mass	2.27±0.23 M_{☉}
Radius	2.4 R_{☉}
Luminosity	29.5 L_{☉}
Surface gravity (log g)	3.95 cgs
Temperature	9,025 K
Metallicity [Fe/H]	+0.32 dex
Rotation	2.13 days
Rotational velocity (v sin i)	11.3 km/s
Age	630 Myr

Other designations
- Cleeia, δ^{3} Tau, 68 Tauri, BD+17°719, HD 27962, HIP 20648, HR 1389, SAO 93923, ADS 3206

Database references
SIMBAD	data

Delta^{3} Tauri (δ^{3} Tauri) is a binary star system in the zodiac constellation of Taurus. Based upon an annual parallax shift of 21.96 mas as seen from Earth, it is located roughly 149 light-years from the Sun. It is visible to the naked eye with a combined apparent visual magnitude of +4.32. δ^{3} Tauri is separated from δ^{1} Tauri by 0.72° on the sky. Some modern astronomy books give this star the name Cleeia, from the Greek Kleeia (transliteration of Κλεεια), who was one of the Hyades sisters. It is considered a member of the Hyades cluster.

In Chinese, 畢宿 (Bì Xiù), meaning Net, refers to an asterism consisting δ^{3} Tauri, ε Tauri, δ^{1} Tauri, γ Tauri, Aldebaran, 71 Tauri and λ Tauri. Consequently, the Chinese name for δ^{3} Tauri itself is 畢宿二 (Bì Xiù èr), "the Second Star of Net".

The magnitude 4.35 primary, component A, appears to be an A-type star intermediate between main sequence and subgiant, with a stellar classification of A2 IV-Vs. The "s" indicates sharp (unusually narrow) absorption lines, a sign of slow rotation. It is a candidate blue straggler and shows characteristics of an Am star. Abt (1985) gave it a classification of A2kA3hA5m, indicating that the spectrum displays the calcium K-line of an A2 star, the hydrogen lines of an A3 star and the metal lines of an A5 star. It is deficient in scandium but has enhanced iron peak and heavy elements. Although suspected of variability in the past, Delta^{3} Tauri A was subsequently determined to be photometrically constant.

The companion, component B, is a magnitude 8.37 star at an angular separation of 1.80 arcseconds along a position angle of 341°, as of 2010. At 77 arcseconds away (as of 2006) is a magnitude 11.12 visual companion, designated component C and also a member of the Hyades.
