= Aldebaran =

Brightest star in Taurus

- Location of Aldebaran (circled)

Observation data Epoch J2000.0 Equinox ICRS
- Constellation: Taurus
- Pronunciation: /ælˈdɛbərən/
- α Tauri A
- Right ascension: 04^{h} 35^{m} 55.23907^{s}
- Declination: +16° 30′ 33.4885″
- Apparent magnitude (V): 0.75–0.95
- α Tauri B
- Right ascension: 04^{h} 35^{m} 57.24674^{s}
- Declination: +16° 30′ 21.3433″
- Apparent magnitude (V): 13.21

Characteristics

α Tauri A
- Evolutionary stage: Red giant branch
- Spectral type: K5+ III
- Apparent magnitude (J): −2.095
- U−B color index: +1.92
- B−V color index: +1.44
- Variable type: LB

α Tauri B
- Evolutionary stage: Main sequence
- Spectral type: M2.5

Astrometry

α Tauri A
Radial velocity (R_{v})	+54.26±0.03 km/s
Proper motion (μ)	RA: 63.45 mas/yr Dec.: −188.94 mas/yr
Parallax (π)	48.94±0.77 mas
Distance	67 ± 1 ly (20.4 ± 0.3 pc)
Absolute magnitude (M_{V})	−0.641±0.034

α Tauri B
Proper motion (μ)	RA: +58.919 mas/yr Dec.: −198.841 mas/yr
Parallax (π)	47.2526±0.0964 mas
Distance	69.0 ± 0.1 ly (21.16 ± 0.04 pc)

Details

α Tauri A
Mass	1.03±0.07 M_{☉}
Radius	45.1±0.1 R_{☉}
Luminosity	439±17 L_{☉}
Surface gravity (log g)	1.45±0.3 cgs
Temperature	3,900±50 K
Metallicity [Fe/H]	−0.33±0.1 dex
Rotation	520 days
Rotational velocity (v sin i)	3.5±1.5 km/s
Age	6.4+1.4 −1.1 Gyr

α Tauri B
Mass	0.400±0.084 M_{☉}
Radius	0.347±0.039 R_{☉}
Surface gravity (log g)	4.96±0.17 cgs
Temperature	3,398±89.5 K

Other designations
- Aldebaran, Alpha Tau, α Tau, 87 Tauri, BD+16°629, GJ 171.1, GJ 9159, HD 29139, HIP 21421, HR 1457, SAO 94027

Database references
SIMBAD	Aldebaran
- B
Exoplanet Archive	data
ARICNS	Aldebaran
- B

Aldebaran (Arabic: الدَّبَرَان, lit. 'The Follower') is a red giant star in the zodiac constellation of Taurus. It has the Bayer designation α Tauri, which is Latinized to Alpha Tauri and abbreviated Alpha Tau or α Tau. Aldebaran varies in brightness from an apparent visual magnitude of 0.75 down to 0.95, making it the brightest star in the constellation, as well as (typically) the fourteenth-brightest star in the night sky. It is at a distance of approximately 67 light-years. The star lies along the line of sight to the nearby Hyades cluster, but is unrelated and much older than the young cluster.

Aldebaran is a red giant with a radius about 45 times that of the Sun's, though its mass is about equal. This is because, with an age of over six billion years, the star is in the final stages of its life, having evolved off the main sequence on the Hertzsprung–Russell diagram after depleting the supply of hydrogen in its core. The star is cooler than the Sun with a surface temperature of 3,900 K, though is over 400 times as luminous due to its surface area. The star spins slowly, taking 520 days to complete a rotation.

Together with the star Alpha Tauri B (Aldebaran B), it makes a binary star system with an orbital separation of at least 680 astronomical units, or 680 times the average distance from Earth to the Sun. The companion is significantly fainter in the sky, having an apparent magnitude of 13.21, which is 80,000 to 96,000 times fainter than Aldebaran, and cannot be seen with the naked eye.

== Nomenclature ==
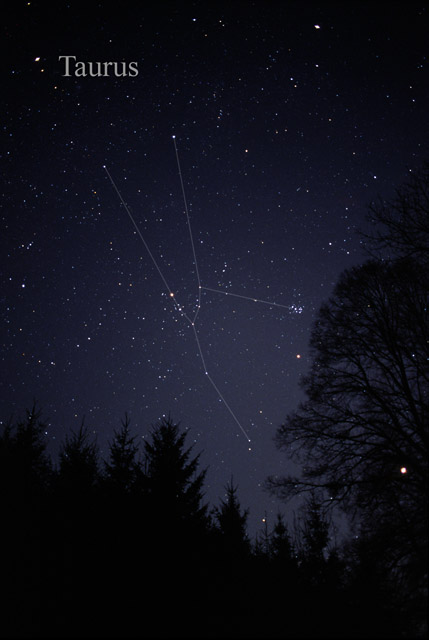
Aldebaran is the brightest star in the constellation of Taurus (center).

Aldebaran is the brightest star in the constellation Taurus, given the Bayer designation α Tauri (Alpha Tauri) by Johann Bayer.

The traditional name Aldebaran derives from the Arabic al Dabarān (الدبران), meaning 'the follower', because it seems to follow the Pleiades. In 2016, the International Astronomical Union Working Group on Star Names (WGSN) approved the proper name Aldebaran for this star.

Aldebaran additionally has the Flamsteed designation 87 Tauri, as the 87th star in the constellation of approximately 7th magnitude or brighter, ordered by right ascension. It also has the Bright Star Catalogue number 1457, the HD number 29139, and the Hipparcos catalogue number 21421, mostly seen in scientific publications. It is a variable star listed in the General Catalogue of Variable Stars, but it is listed using its Bayer designation and does not have a separate variable star designation.

Aldebaran and several nearby stars are included in double star catalogues such as the Washington Double Star Catalog as WDS 04359+1631 and the Aitken Double Star Catalogue as ADS 3321. It was included with an 11th-magnitude companion as a double star as H IV 66 in the Herschel Catalogue of Double Stars and Σ II 2 in the Struve Double Star Catalog, and together with a 14th-magnitude star as β 550 in the Burnham Double Star Catalogue.

== Observation ==
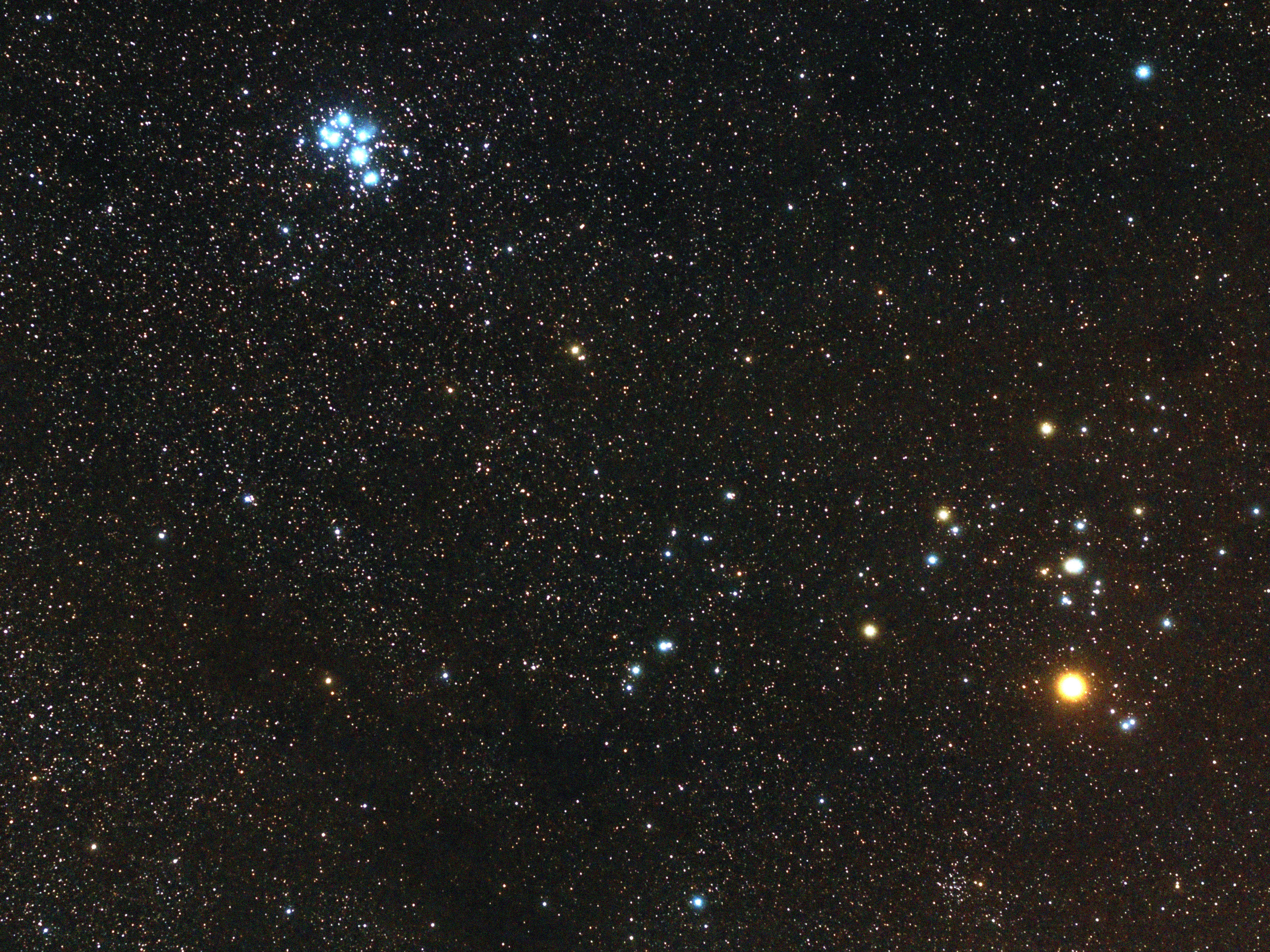
Aldebaran in the Hyades (north is to the left)

Aldebaran is one of the easiest stars to find in the night sky, partly due to its brightness and partly due to being near one of the more noticeable asterisms in the sky. Following the three stars of Orion's belt in the direction opposite to Sirius, the first bright star encountered is Aldebaran. It is best seen at midnight between late November and early December.

The star is, by chance, in the line of sight between the Earth and the Hyades, so it has the appearance of being the brightest member of the open cluster, but the cluster that forms the bull's-head-shaped asterism is more than twice as far away, at about 150 light years.

Aldebaran is 5.47 degrees south of the ecliptic and so can be occulted by the Moon. Such occultations occur when the Moon's ascending node is near the autumnal equinox. A series of 49 occultations occurred starting on 29 January 2015 and ending at 3 September 2018. Each event was visible from points in the northern hemisphere or close to the equator. People further south, in Australia or Southern Africa for example, can never observe occultations of Aldebaran because of parallax. The change in position of the Moon relative to the stars due to the effect of parallax means that Aldebaran is too far south of the ecliptic for occultations to be observed. A reasonably accurate estimate for the diameter of Aldebaran was obtained during the occultation of 22 September 1978. In the 2020s, Aldebaran is in conjunction in ecliptic longitude with the sun around May 30 of each year.

With a near-infrared J band magnitude of −2.1, only Betelgeuse (−2.9), R Doradus (−2.6), and Arcturus (−2.2) are brighter at that wavelength.

== Observational history ==
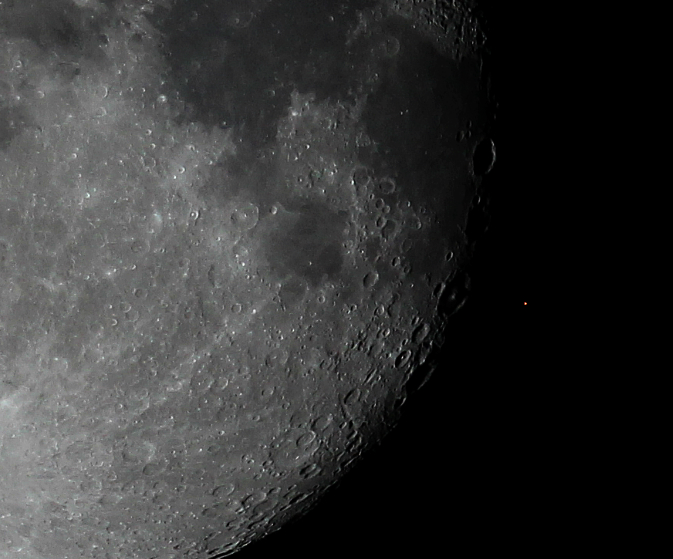
Occultation of Aldebaran by the Moon. Aldebaran is the red dot to the right, barely visible in the thumbnail.

On 11 March AD 509, a lunar occultation of Aldebaran was observed in Athens. English astronomer Edmund Halley studied the timing of this event, and in 1718 concluded that Aldebaran must have changed position since that time, moving several minutes of arc further to the north. This, as well as observations of the changing positions of stars Sirius and Arcturus, led to the discovery of proper motion. Based on present day observations, the position of Aldebaran has shifted 7′ in the last 2000 years; roughly a quarter the diameter of the full moon. Due to precession of the equinoxes, 5,000 years ago the vernal equinox was close to Aldebaran. Between 420,000 and 210,000 years ago, Aldebaran was the brightest star in the night sky, peaking in brightness 320,000 years ago with an apparent magnitude of −1.54.

English astronomer William Herschel discovered a faint companion to Aldebaran in 1782; an 11th-magnitude star at an angular separation of 117″. This star was shown to be itself a close double star by S. W. Burnham in 1888, and he discovered an additional 14th-magnitude companion at an angular separation of 31″. Follow-on measurements of proper motion showed that Herschel's companion was diverging from Aldebaran, and hence they were not physically connected. However, the companion discovered by Burnham had almost exactly the same proper motion as Aldebaran, suggesting that the two formed a wide binary star system.

Working at his private observatory in Tulse Hill, England, in 1864 William Huggins performed the first studies of the spectrum of Aldebaran, where he was able to identify the lines of nine elements, including iron, sodium, calcium, and magnesium. In 1886, Edward C. Pickering at the Harvard College Observatory used a photographic plate to capture fifty absorption lines in the spectrum of Aldebaran. This became part of the Draper Catalogue, published in 1890. By 1887, the photographic technique had improved to the point that it was possible to measure a star's radial velocity from the amount of Doppler shift in the spectrum. By this means, the recession velocity of Aldebaran was estimated as 30 miles per second (48 km/s), using measurements performed at Potsdam Observatory by Hermann C. Vogel and his assistant Julius Scheiner.

Aldebaran was observed using an interferometer attached to the Hooker Telescope at the Mount Wilson Observatory in 1921 in order to measure its angular diameter, but it was not resolved in these observations.

The extensive history of observations of Aldebaran led to it being included in the list of 33 stars chosen as benchmarks for the Gaia mission to calibrate derived stellar parameters. It had previously been used to calibrate instruments on board the Hubble Space Telescope.

== Physical characteristics ==
Size comparison between Aldebaran and the Sun

Aldebaran is listed as the spectral standard for type K5+ III stars. Its spectrum indicates that it is a giant star; the supply of hydrogen at its core has been exhausted, leading to a degenerate helium core with a shell of hydrogen undergoing fusion by the CNO cycle. This has caused the star to transition off the main sequence into the red giant branch (RGB), where it has swollen to an immense size and dropped in surface temperature.

The effective temperature of Aldebaran's photosphere is 3,900 K. It has a surface gravity of 1.45 cgs, typical for a giant star, but around 35 times lower than the Earth's and nearly a thousand times lower than the Sun's. Its metallicity is about half the Sun's.

Measurements by the Hipparcos satellite and other sources put Aldebaran around 65.3 light-years (20.0 parsecs) away. Asteroseismology has determined that it is about 16% more massive than the Sun, yet it shines with 439 times the Sun's luminosity due to the expanded radius. It is 45.1 times the diameter of the Sun, approximately 63 million kilometres. The angular diameter of Aldebaran has been measured many times. The value adopted as part of the Gaia benchmark calibration is 20.580±0.030 mas.

Aldebaran is a slightly variable star, assigned to the slow irregular type LB. The General Catalogue of Variable Stars indicates variation between apparent magnitude 0.75 and 0.95 from historical reports. Modern studies show a smaller amplitude, with some showing almost no variation. Hipparcos photometry shows an amplitude of only about 0.02 magnitudes and a possible period around 18 days. Intensive ground-based photometry showed variations of up to 0.03 magnitudes and a possible period around 91 days. Analysis of observations over a much longer period still find a total amplitude likely to be less than 0.1 magnitudes, and the variation is considered to be irregular.

The photosphere shows abundances of carbon, oxygen, and nitrogen that suggest the giant has gone through its first dredge-up stage—a normal step in the evolution of a star into a red giant during which material from deep within the star is brought up to the surface by convection. With its slow rotation, Aldebaran lacks a dynamo needed to generate a corona and hence is not a source of hard X-ray emission. However, small scale magnetic fields may still be present in the lower atmosphere, resulting from convection turbulence near the surface. The measured strength of the magnetic field on Aldebaran is 0.22 G. Any resulting soft X-ray emissions from this region may be attenuated by the chromosphere, although ultraviolet emission has been detected in the spectrum. The star is currently losing mass at a rate of (1–1.6)×10^{−11} M_{☉}/yr (about one Earth mass in 300,000 years) with a velocity of 30 km/s. This stellar wind may be generated by the weak magnetic fields in the lower atmosphere.

Beyond the chromosphere of Aldebaran is an extended molecular outer atmosphere (MOLsphere) where the temperature is cool enough for molecules of gas to form. This region lies at about 2.5 times the radius of the star and has a temperature of about 1,500 K. The spectrum reveals lines of carbon monoxide, water, and titanium oxide. Outside the MOLSphere, the stellar wind continues to expand until it reaches the termination shock boundary with the hot, ionized interstellar medium that dominates the Local Bubble, forming a roughly spherical astrosphere with a radius of around 1000 au, centered on Aldebaran.

== Companion ==
Measurements by the Gaia spacecraft have identified a proper motion companion to Aldebaran – a star sharing a similar distance and relative motion, which are seen as hints for a physical association between the components. As of 2024, it has an angular separation of 33" from Aldebaran along a position angle of 117°. At its distance, the angular separation implies a physical projected separation of 680 astronomical units.

The companion star, named Alpha Tauri B or Aldebaran B, has an apparent magnitude of 13.2, which is 80,000 to 96,000 times fainter than Aldebaran. (Note: Calculated with $\sqrt[5]{100}^{(m_1-m_2)}$) It is also much smaller than Aldebaran, with a radius 0.35 times that of the Sun and a mass 0.400 times that of the Sun. A spectral type of M2.5 has been published for the star.

== Visual companions ==
Four further stars at least as bright as B appear close to Aldebaran in the sky. These double star components were given upper-case Latin letter designations more or less in the order of their discovery, with the letter A reserved for the primary star. Some characteristics of these components, including their position relative to Aldebaran, are shown in the table.

WDS 04359+1631 catalogue entry
α Tau	Apparent magnitude	Angular separation (″)	Position angle (°)	Year	Parallax (mas)
C	11.30	129.50	32	2011	19.1267±0.4274
D	13.70	—N/a	—N/a	—N/a	—N/a
E	12.00	36.10	323	2000	
F	13.60	255.70	121	2000	0.1626±0.0369

Alpha Tauri CD is a binary system with the C and D component stars gravitationally bound to and co-orbiting each other. These co-orbiting stars have been shown to be located far beyond Aldebaran and are members of the Hyades star cluster. As with the rest of the stars in the cluster, they do not physically interact with Aldebaran in any way.

== Planets ==
In 1993 radial velocity measurements of Aldebaran, Arcturus and Pollux showed that Aldebaran exhibited a long-period radial velocity oscillation, which could be interpreted as a substellar companion. The measurements for Aldebaran implied a companion with a minimum mass 11.4 times that of Jupiter in a 643-day orbit at a separation of 2.0 AU (300 Gm) in a mildly eccentric orbit. However, all three stars surveyed showed similar oscillations yielding similar companion masses, and the authors concluded that the variation was likely to be intrinsic to the star rather than due to the gravitational effect of a companion.

In 2015 a study led by Artie P. Hatzes showed stable long-term evidence for both a planetary companion and stellar activity. An asteroseismic analysis of the residuals to the planet fit has determined that Aldebaran b has a minimum mass of 5.8±0.7 Jupiter masses, and that when the star was on the main sequence it would have given this planet Earth-like levels of illumination and therefore, potentially, temperature. This would have placed it and any of its moons in the habitable zone. However, a follow-up study in 2019 found that additional data weaken the evidence for a planetary companion. A two-planet solution fits the data better but would be unstable; the more likely explanation is that the radial velocity variations are caused by intrinsic stellar oscillations that mimic a planetary companion, as observed in Gamma Draconis and 42 Draconis. Based on the 2019 study, some subsequent studies of planet candidates around giant stars consider Aldebaran b doubtful or disproven, including a 2025 paper with Hatzes as the lead author.

The Aldebaran planetary system
Companion (in order from star)	Mass	Semimajor axis (AU)	Orbital period (days)	Eccentricity	Inclination (°)	Radius
b (dubious)	≥5.8±0.7 M_{J}	1.46±0.27	628.96±0.9	0.1±0.05	—	—

== Etymology and mythology ==
Aldebaran was originally نَيِّر اَلدَّبَرَان (Nayyir al-Dabarān in Arabic), meaning 'the bright one of the follower', since it follows the Pleiades; in fact, the Arabs sometimes also applied‍ the name al-Dabarān to the Hyades as a whole. A variety of transliterated spellings have been used, with the current Aldebaran becoming standard relatively recently.

=== Mythology ===
This easily seen and striking star in its suggestive asterism is a popular subject for ancient and modern myths.

- Mexican culture: For the Seris of northwestern Mexico, this star provides light for the seven women giving birth (Pleiades). It has three names: Hant Caalajc Ipápjö, Queeto, and Azoj Yeen oo Caap ('star that goes ahead'). The lunar month corresponding to October is called Queeto yaao 'Aldebaran's path'.
- Australian Aboriginal culture: amongst indigenous people of the Clarence River, in north-eastern New South Wales, this star is the ancestor Karambal, who stole another man's wife. The woman's husband tracked him down and burned the tree in which he was hiding. It is believed that he rose to the sky as smoke and became the star Aldebaran.
- Persian culture: Aldebaran is considered one of the 4 "royal stars".

=== Names in other languages ===
- Aside from al-Dabarān, other traditional Arabic names are ʽAin al-Thaur, the eye of Taurus, and al-Fanīq, the large or male camel, with the Hyades being al-Qilāṣ, the small camels.
- In Hindu astronomy, it is identified as the lunar station Rohini, the red one. In Hindu mythology, Rohini is one of the twenty-seven daughters of the sage-king Daksha and Asikni, and the favourite wife of the moon god, Chandra.
- In Persian, it was known as Tascheter.
- The Ancient Greek name Λαμπαδίας Lampadias, literally 'torch-like' or 'torch-bearer', was used in Ptolemy's Tetrabiblos.
- A Latin name is Palilicium (or Parilicium), so called because this star disappeared in twilight around the time of Parilia, the feast of Pales on April 21. This name appeared in Flamsteed and Bode's star catalogues. Another Latin name, used in the medieval Alfonsine Tables, was Cor Tauri, the heart of the bull.
- In Chinese astronomy, 畢宿 (Bì Xiù), meaning 'Net', refers to an asterism consisting of Aldebaran, ε Tauri, δ^{3} Tauri, δ^{1} Tauri, γ Tauri, 71 Tauri and λ Tauri. Consequently, the Chinese name for Aldebaran itself is 畢宿五 (Bì Xiù wǔ), 'the Fifth Star of Net'.
- In Hawaiian, the star is named Kapuahi.
- In Biblical Hebrew, עָשׁ (ʿāš) in Job 9:9 and עַ֫יִשׁ (ʿayiš) in Job 38:32 have been identified with it and translated accordingly in English versions such as NJPS and REB.

=== In modern culture ===
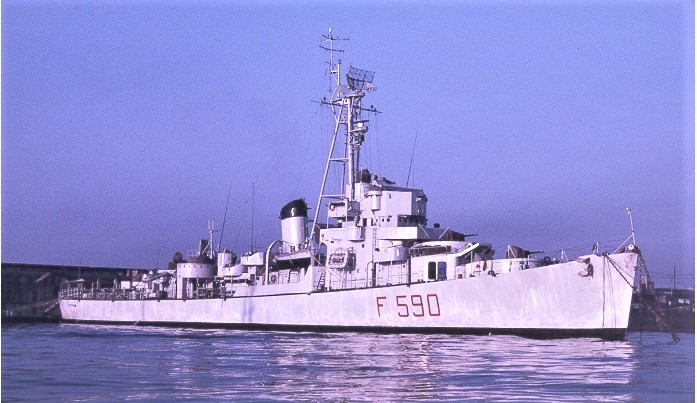
Italian frigate Aldebaran (F 590)

As the brightest star in a Zodiac constellation, it is given great significance within astrology.

Irish singer and composer Enya has a piece released on her eponymous album in 1986, which lyricist Roma Ryan titled Aldebaran after the star in Taurus.

The name Aldebaran or Alpha Tauri has been adopted many times, including

- Aldebaran Rock in Antarctica
- United States Navy stores ship USS Aldebaran (AF-10) and Italian frigate Aldebaran (F 590)
- proposed micro-satellite launch vehicle Aldebaran
- French company Aldebaran Robotics
- Fashion brand AlphaTauri
- Formula One team Scuderia AlphaTauri, active from 2020 to 2023, previously known as Toro Rosso
- One of the chariot race horses owned by Sheikh Ilderim in the movie Ben-Hur

The star also appears in works of fiction such as Far from the Madding Crowd (1874) and Down and Out in Paris and London (1933). It is frequently seen in science fiction, including the Lensman series (1948–1954), Fallen Dragon (2001) and passingly in Kim Stanley Robinson's "Blue Mars" (1996). Aldebaran is associated with Hastur, also known as The King in Yellow, in the horror stories of Robert W. Chambers.

In the 1892 alien invasion novel The Germ Growers, the titular red star itself is referenced.

In the light novel series Re:Zero, the character Aldebaran is named after the star.

In the Star Trek: The Next Generation episode 'Relics', Montgomery Scott and Captain Jean-Luc Picard drink "Aldebaran whisky".

One of poet and amateur astronomer George Sterling's most critically-praised poems is his sonnet "Aldebaran at Dusk." Sterling also features Aldebaran in his long astronomical poem "The Testimony of the Suns" and mentions the red giant in "A Wine of Wizardry".

Aldebaran regularly features in conspiracy theories as one of the origins of extraterrestrial aliens, often linked to Nazi UFOs. A well-known example is the German conspiracy theorist Axel Stoll, who considered the star the home of the Aryan race and the target of expeditions by the Wehrmacht.

The planetary exploration probe Pioneer 10 is no longer powered or in contact with Earth, but its trajectory is taking it in the general direction of Aldebaran. It is expected to make its closest approach in about two million years.

The Austrian chemist Carl Auer von Welsbach proposed the name aldebaranium (chemical symbol Ad) for a rare earth element that he (among others) had found. Today, it is called ytterbium (symbol Yb).

== See also ==
- Lists of stars
- List of brightest stars
- List of nearest bright stars
- Historical brightest stars
- Taurus (Chinese astronomy)
