= Epsilon Tauri =

Star in the constellation Taurus

Epsilon Tauri / Ain
- Location of ε Tauri (circled)

Observation data Epoch J2000 Equinox ICRS
- Constellation: Taurus
- Right ascension: 04^{h} 28^{m} 37.0003^{s}
- Declination: +19° 10′ 49.563″
- Apparent magnitude (V): +3.53

Characteristics
- Evolutionary stage: red clump
- Spectral type: K0III
- B−V color index: 1.014

Astrometry
| Radial velocity (R_{v}) | 38.420±0.0004 km/s |
| Proper motion (μ) | RA: 107.526±0.193 mas/yr Dec.: −36.200±0.126 mas/yr |
| Parallax (π) | 22.3654±0.1721 mas |
| Distance | 146 ± 1 ly (44.7 ± 0.3 pc) |
| Absolute magnitude (M_{V}) | 0.145 |

Details
| Mass | 2.458±0.073 M_{☉} |
| Radius | 12.46±0.10 R_{☉} |
| Luminosity | 79.4±3.4 L_{☉} |
| Habitable zone inner limit | 8.06±0.24 AU |
| Habitable zone outer limit | 15.82±0.47 AU |
| Surface gravity (log g) | 2.66+0.03 −0.05 cgs |
| Temperature | 4,880±67 K |
| Metallicity [Fe/H] | +0.15±0.02 dex |
| Rotation | 141.1 days |
| Rotational velocity (v sin i) | 3.0 km/s |
| Age | 600+150 −50 Myr |

Other designations
- Ain, Oculus Boreus, Epsilon Tau, ε Tau, 74 Tau, BD+18°640, FK5 164, GC 5430, HD 28305, HIP 20889, HR 1409, SAO 93954, CCDM J04286+1911, WDS J04286+1911A

Database references
| SIMBAD | data |
| Exoplanet Archive | data |

Epsilon Tauri or ε Tauri, formally named Ain (/ˈeɪn/), is an orange giant star located approximately 146 light-years (45 parsecs) from the Sun in the constellation of Taurus. An exoplanet (designated Epsilon Tauri b, later named Amateru) is believed to be orbiting the star.

It is a member of the Hyades open cluster. As such its age is well constrained at 625 million years. It is claimed to be the heaviest among planet-harboring stars with reliable initial masses. Given its large mass, this star, though presently of spectral type K0 III, was formerly of spectral type A that has now evolved off the main sequence into the giant phase. It is regarded as a red clump giant; that is, a core-helium burning star.

Since Epsilon Tauri lies near the plane of the ecliptic, it is sometimes occulted by the Moon and (very rarely) by planets.

It has an 11th magnitude companion 182 arcseconds away, although this is an unrelated background star.

== Nomenclature ==
ε Tauri (Latinised to Epsilon Tauri) is the star's Bayer designation; it also bears the Flamsteed designation of 74 Tauri. On discovery, the planet was designated Epsilon Tauri b (or Ain b).

The star bore the traditional name Ain (Arabic عين for "eye") and was given the name Oculus Boreus (Latin for "Northern eye") by John Flamsteed. In 2016, the International Astronomical Union organized a Working Group on Star Names (WGSN) to catalog and standardize proper names for stars. The WGSN's first bulletin of July 2016 included a table of the first two batches of names approved by the WGSN; which included Ain for this star.

In July 2014, the International Astronomical Union launched NameExoWorlds, a process for giving proper names to certain exoplanets. The process involved public nomination and voting for the new names. In December 2015, the IAU announced the winning name was Amateru for this planet.

The winning name was based on that submitted by the Kamagari Astronomical Observatory of Kure, Hiroshima Prefecture, Japan: namely 'Amaterasu', the Shinto goddess of the Sun, born from the left eye of the god Izanagi. The IAU substituted 'Amateru' – which is a common Japanese appellation for shrines when they enshrine Amaterasu – because 'Amaterasu' is already used for an asteroid (10385 Amaterasu).

In Chinese, 畢宿 (Bì Xiù), meaning Net, refers to an asterism consisting ε Tauri, δ^{3} Tauri, δ^{1} Tauri, γ Tauri, Aldebaran, θ^{2} Tauri, 71 Tauri and λ Tauri. Consequently, the Chinese name for ε Tauri itself is 畢宿一 (Bì Xiù yī), "the First Star of Net".

== Planetary system ==
In 2007, a massive exoplanet was reported orbiting the star with a period of 1.6 years in a somewhat eccentric orbit. It was the first planet ever discovered in an open cluster. A 2023 study updated this planet's parameters, and detected additional radial velocity variations that are likely caused by stellar activity.

The Epsilon Tauri planetary system
| Companion (in order from star) | Mass | Semimajor axis (AU) | Orbital period (days) | Eccentricity | Inclination (°) | Radius |
|---|---|---|---|---|---|---|
| b (Amateru) | ≥7.190±0.056 M_{J} | 1.878±0.001 | 585.82+0.26 −0.33 | 0.076+0.009 −0.008 | — | — |
