= 90 Tauri =

A-type main-sequence star in the constellation Taurus

- Location of 90 Tauri (circled in red)

Observation data Epoch J2000 Equinox ICRS
- Constellation: Taurus
- Right ascension: 04^{h} 38^{m} 09.46166^{s}
- Declination: +12° 30′ 38.9918″
- Apparent magnitude (V): 4.27

Characteristics
- Evolutionary stage: main sequence
- Spectral type: A6 V
- U−B color index: +0.11
- B−V color index: +0.12

Astrometry
Radial velocity (R_{v})	40.30±1 km/s
Proper motion (μ)	RA: 102.40 mas/yr Dec.: −15.78 mas/yr
Parallax (π)	22.6374±0.3453 mas
Distance	144 ± 2 ly (44.2 ± 0.7 pc)
Absolute magnitude (M_{V})	+1.18

Details
Mass	2.09±0.11 M_{☉}
Radius	2.8 R_{☉}
Surface gravity (log g)	3.88±0.10 cgs
Temperature	8,130 K
Rotational velocity (v sin i)	89 km/s

Other designations
- c Tau, 90 Tau, BD+12°618, FK5 2342, HD 29388, HIP 21589, HR 1473, SAO 94044

Database references
SIMBAD	data

90 Tauri (90 Tau) is a star in the zodiac constellation of Taurus, located 144 light-years away from the Sun. It is visible to the naked eye as a faint, white-hued star with an apparent visual magnitude of 4.27. 90 Tauri is a member of the Hyades cluster and is listed as a double star.

This is an A-type main-sequence star with a stellar classification of A6 V. It has 2.1 times the mass of the Sun and 2.8 times the Sun's radius. An orbiting companion was announced in 2014. This is probably a spectral class K4V star with an estimated orbital period of at least 84 days. The primary is being orbited by a debris disk.
