= Epsilon Tauri b =

Super Jupiter orbiting Epsilon Tauri

Epsilon Tauri b / Amateru
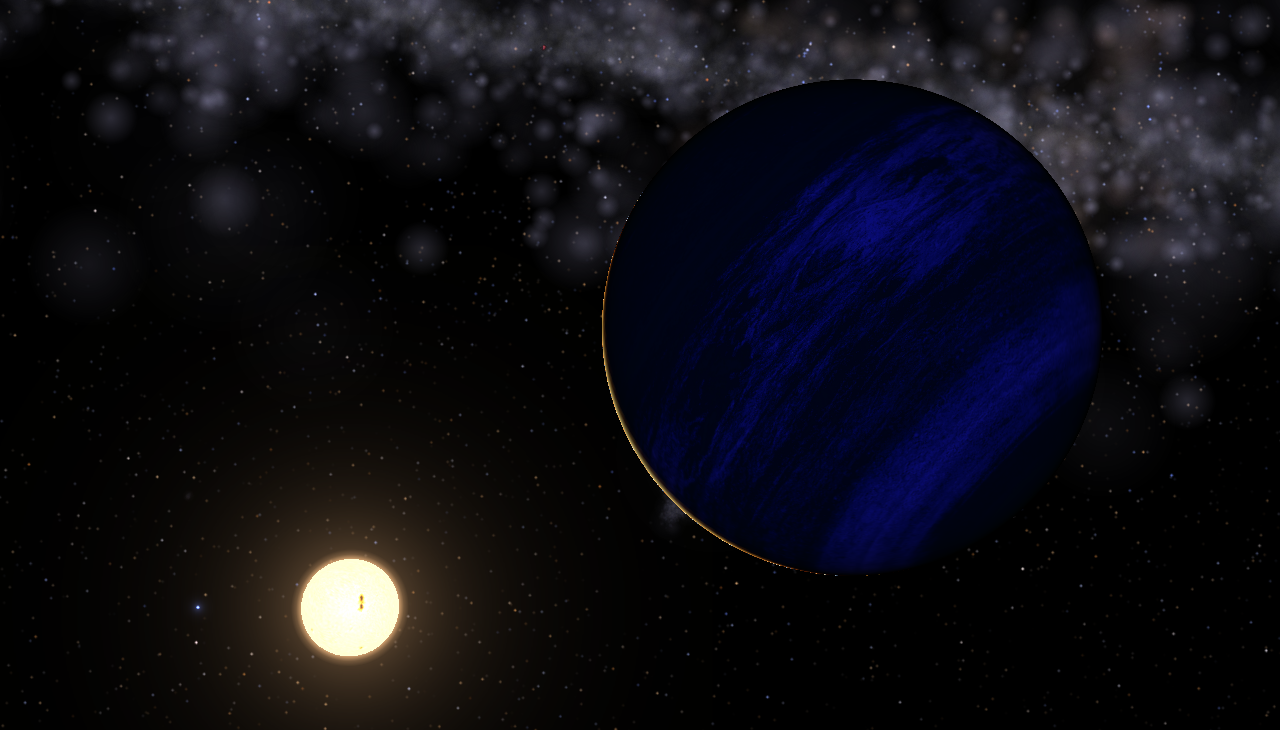
- Artistic simulation of Epsilon Tauri b orbiting its host star.

Discovery
- Discovered by: Sato et al.
- Discovery date: 7 February 2007
- Detection method: Doppler spectroscopy

Orbital characteristics
- Semi-major axis: 1.878±0.001 AU
- Eccentricity: 0.076+0.009 −0.008
- Orbital period (sidereal): 585.82+0.26 −0.33 d
- Time of periastron: 2453492.3+11.3 −10.0 JD
- Argument of periastron: 107.90°+6.82° −6.07°
- Semi-amplitude: 93.24+0.74 −0.73 m/s
- Star: Epsilon Tauri

Physical characteristics
- Mass: ≥7.190±0.056 M_{J}

Epsilon Tauri b (abbreviated ε Tauri b or ε Tau b), formally named Amateru /æməˈtɛruː/, is a super-Jupiter exoplanet orbiting the K-type giant star Epsilon Tauri approximately 146 light-years (45 parsecs) away from the Earth in the constellation of Taurus. It orbits the star further out than Earth orbits the Sun. It has moderate eccentricity.

The planet orbits one of the four giant stars in the Hyades star cluster, and was the first planet ever discovered in an open cluster.

== Name ==
In July 2014, the International Astronomical Union (IAU) launched NameExoWorlds, a process for giving proper names to certain exoplanets. The process involved public nomination and voting for the new names. In December 2015, the IAU announced the winning name was Amateru for this planet. The name was based on that submitted by the Kamagari Astronomical Observatory of Kure, Hiroshima Prefecture, Japan: namely 'Amaterasu', the Shinto goddess of the Sun, born from the left eye of the god Izanagi. The IAU substituted 'Amateru' - which is a common Japanese appellation for shrines when they enshrine Amaterasu - because 'Amaterasu' is already used for asteroid 10385 Amaterasu.

== Characteristics ==
=== Mass, radius and temperature ===
Epsilon Tauri b is a "super-Jupiter", an exoplanet that has a mass larger than that of the gas giants Jupiter and Saturn. It has a temperature of 541 K (268 °C; 514 °F). It has a minimum mass of around 7.2 M_{J} and a potential radius of around 18% larger than Jupiter (1.18 R_{J}, or 12 R_{🜨}) based on its mass, since it is more massive than the jovian planet.

=== Host star ===
The planet orbits a (K-type) giant star named Epsilon Tauri. It has exhausted the hydrogen supply in its core and is currently fusing helium. The star has a mass of 2.7 M_{☉} and a radius of around 12.6 R_{☉}. It has a surface temperature of 4901 K and is 625 million years old. In comparison, the Sun is about 4.6 billion years old and has a surface temperature of 5778 K.

The star's apparent magnitude, or how bright it appears from Earth's perspective, is 3.53. Therefore, Epsilon Tauri can be seen with the naked eye.

=== Orbit ===
Epsilon Tauri b orbits its star with about 78 times the Sun's luminosity (78 L_{☉}) every 586 days at a distance of 1.88 AU (compared to Mars' orbital distance from the Sun, which is 1.52 AU). It has a mildly eccentric orbit, with an eccentricity of 0.08.

== Discovery ==
Epsilon Tauri b was discovered by using the High Dispersion Echelle Spectrograph at Okayama Astrophysical Observatory (OAO) as part of a process to study G-type and K-type giant stars to search for exoplanets. Measurements of radial velocity from Epsilon Tauri were taken between December 2003 and July 2006. Wobbles in the star were detected, and after analyzing the data, it was eventually concluded that there was a planetary companion with a mass 7 times that of Jupiter orbiting Epsilon Tauri every 595 days, or nearly 2 years with an eccentricity of 0.15. These values were later refined to a period of 586 days and an eccentricity of 0.08.

== In popular culture ==
The planet Amateru is mentioned by name in the science fiction book Starsong Chronicles: Exodus by American author JJ Clayborn.

== See also ==
- 4 Ursae Majoris b
- Epsilon Eridani b
- Epsilon Reticuli Ab
