= USS Wingfield =

Cannon-class destroyer escort

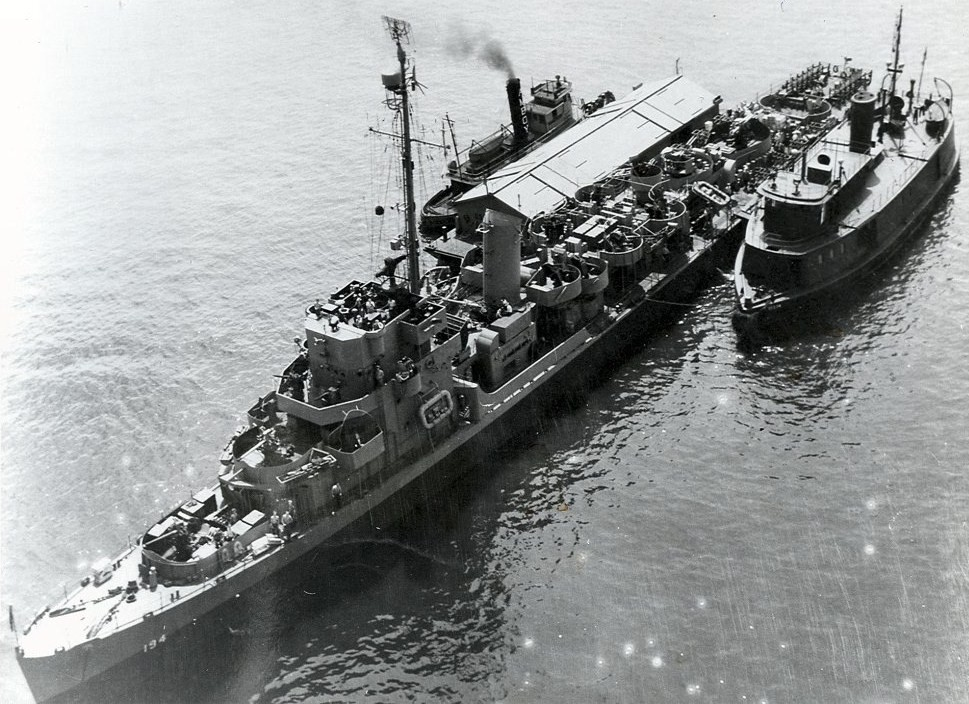

History

United States
- Name: USS Wingfield (DE-194)
- Namesake: John Davis Wingfield
- Builder: Federal Shipbuilding and Drydock Company, Newark, New Jersey
- Laid down: 7 October 1943
- Launched: 30 December 1943
- Commissioned: 28 January 1944
- Decommissioned: 26 August 1947
- Stricken: 20 October 1950
- Fate: Transferred to France, 15 September 1950
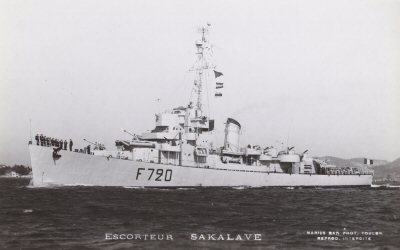
- French Frigate Sakalave (F720)

History

France
- Name: Sakalave (F720)
- Namesake: Sakalava people
- Acquired: 15 September 1950
- Fate: Scrapped, 1960

General characteristics
- Class & type: Cannon-class destroyer escort
- Displacement: 1,240 long tons (1,260 t) standard; 1,620 long tons (1,646 t) full
- Length: 306 ft (93 m) o/a; 300 ft (91 m) w/l
- Beam: 36 ft 10 in (11.23 m)
- Draft: 11 ft 8 in (3.56 m)
- Propulsion: 4 × GM Mod. 16-278A diesel engines with electric drive, 6,000 shp (4,474 kW), 2 screws
- Speed: 21 knots (39 km/h; 24 mph)
- Range: 10,800 nmi (20,000 km) at 12 kn (22 km/h; 14 mph)
- Complement: 15 officers and 201 enlisted
- Armament: 3 × single Mk.22 3"/50 caliber guns; 1 × twin 40 mm Mk.1 AA gun; 8 × 20 mm Mk.4 AA guns; 3 × 21-inch (533 mm) torpedo tubes; 1 × Hedgehog Mk.10 anti-submarine mortar (144 rounds); 8 × Mk.6 depth charge projectors; 2 × Mk.9 depth charge tracks

USS Wingfield (DE-194) was a Cannon-class destroyer escort built for the United States Navy during World War II. She served in the Atlantic Ocean and Pacific Ocean and provided escort service against submarine and air attack for Navy vessels and convoys.

== Namesake ==
John Davis Wingfield was born on 4 November 1916 in Richmond, Virginia. He enlisted in the United States Naval Reserve at Washington, D.C., on 15 November 1940. He was appointed an aviation cadet on 5 February 1941. Following flight training at Jacksonville and Miami, Florida. He was appointed a naval aviator on 20 August 1941 and was commissioned an ensign in the United States Naval Reserve on 5 September 1941. After further training in the Advanced Carrier Training Group, Pacific Fleet, he reported for duty to Scouting Squadron Two on 28 December 1941.

During the Battle of the Coral Sea on 8 May 1942 when his bomb failed to release during his initial dive on an Imperial Japanese Navy carrier, he returned to the scene of attack without protection to attack again and never returned from the mission. He was posthumously awarded the American Defense Service Medal and the Navy Cross.

== Construction and commissioning ==
The ship was laid down on 7 October 1943 at Newark, New Jersey, by the Federal Shipbuilding and Drydock Corporation; launched on 30 December 1943; sponsored by Mrs. E. E. Wingfield; and commissioned on 28 January 1944.

== History ==
=== World War II Atlantic Ocean operations ===
Following shakedown training in Bermuda and refresher training in Casco Bay, Maine, Wingfield reported for duty on 1 April 1944 as a training ship for the Destroyer Escort School. She began her primary work on 8 April when she began an escort voyage for a coastal convoy to New York City. Wingfield, in company with Thornhill (DE-195), cleared Norfolk, Virginia, on the 16th for a submarine hunt south of Cape Hatteras, then to Great Sound, Bermuda. She returned to Norfolk on 1 May and became the flagship of Destroyer Escort Division 55.

All ships of this division entered New York harbor on 9 May 1944 and returned to Norfolk the next day with the New York section of Convoy UGS-42, bound for North Africa. This 108-ship convoy sortied from Hampton Roads on 13 May and reached Bizerte, Tunisia, on 1 June. She returned to New York with another convoy on 29 June and got underway from that port on 10 July for refresher training in Casco Bay. Between 24 July and 7 September, she made a second voyage, escorting UGS-49, from Norfolk to Bizerte and back to New York.

After completing voyage repairs in the New York Navy Yard and battle practices at Casco Bay, Wingfield cleared New York on 14 October 1944 for the first of five escort voyages to ports in Great Britain. She returned to New York from Plymouth, England, on 9 November. Wingfield again sailed from New York to Plymouth and back between 2 December 1944 and 1 January 1945. She made a run from New York to Roath Docks, Cardiff, Wales, and back between 18 January and 18 February; one from Boston to Roath Docks and back to New York between 8 March and 4 April; and one from New York to Southampton, England, and back between 24 April and 23 May 1945. She was at Southampton on "V-E Day" and enjoyed the honor of escorting the first peacetime convoy from England to New York.

Despite the presence of aggressive "wolfpacks" of U-boats during the later days of the war, not one ship escorted by Wingfield was damaged by an enemy submarine. During her service in the North Atlantic, this ship rendered medical aid to merchant vessels in convoy on more than 100 occasions.

=== Transfer to the Pacific Theatre ===
After upkeep in the New York Navy Yard and refresher training at Guantanamo Bay, Wingfield transited the Panama Canal on 1 July 1945 with units of Escort Division 55. She stopped briefly at San Diego, California, and arrived at Pearl Harbor on 20 July and underwent a five-day upkeep period. The ship then operated in the Hawaiian area training student officers in underway gunnery practices and anti-submarine exercises.

On 8 August 1945, Wingfield cleared Pearl Harbor with all other units of Escort Division 55 escorting SS Empress of Australia to the safety of the Eniwetok Atoll, Marshall Islands. While at sea on 15 August, the ships received word that Japan had capitulated. The ocean escorts entered Eniwetok lagoon the next day. Between 24 and 29 August, Wingfield joined in a vain search for a reported life raft.

=== End-of-War Activity ===
On 4 September, Wotje and Maloelap expressed their willingness to surrender. On that day, Wingfield proceeded with Baron (DE-166) for the Jaluit Atoll to accept the surrender of the Japanese garrison, then proceeded to Maloelap for the surrender of that atoll. Wotje was formally surrendered on board Baron by Rear Admiral Nobukazu Yoshimi, and Maloelap by Rear Admiral Shochi Tamada on board Wingfield.

On 6 September, Wingfield became the first American warship to enter the Maloelap Atoll. She proceeded to Toroa Anchorage where Admiral Tamada, Lt. Inabi, and Lt. Aoki, of the Imperial Japanese Navy, arrived on board, signed the surrender agreement, and departed the ship. The entire event was completed in 25 minutes. All hands were at battle stations in dress whites for the ceremony.

A brief and simple flag raising ceremony was held on 10 September. Capt. H. B. Grow, USNR, in the presence of the Japanese garrison and a landing force from Wingfield, read the proclamation; copies written in Japanese were distributed to the Japanese garrison. The United States flag was raised over the atoll and colors were sounded, while a detachment of officers, sailors, and marines stood at attention with the Japanese, who also joined in saluting the flag. Wingfield fired a 21-gun salute as the colors reached the top of the flagpole.

During the next six days, Wingfield supervised Japanese compliance with the terms of surrender. On 16 September, the ship got underway to a new anchorage off Engenben Island to allow minesweepers to clear Toroa Anchorage. Meanwhile, she continued to receive Japanese arms on board; and, on 26 September, she transported 56 ill Japanese to Mille for evacuation to Japan. The next day, Toroa Anchorage and Enijun Channel were declared free of mines; and Wingfield returned to supervise the garrison until 1 November when a Japanese evacuation ship came to anchor and evacuated 163 Japanese Army personnel of the Maloelap garrison.

Wingfield got underway on 2 November, touching at Majuro Atoll to unload medical equipment, and thence proceeded to Kwajalein lagoon where she embarked Navy veterans for transportation to the United States. She put to sea from Kwajalein Atoll on 7 December 1945 and steamed by way of Pearl Harbor and San Diego, California, to arrive in the Boston Naval Shipyard on 25 January 1946.

== Post-War deactivation and decommissioning ==
After repairs and dock trials, she stood out of Boston harbor on 17 February and reported to Green Cove Springs, Florida, on 20 February 1946 for inactivation. She was placed out of commission, in reserve, on 15 June 1946 and assigned to the Florida Group of the Atlantic Reserve Fleet.

Wingfield was transferred to the Government of France on 10 September 1950, under terms of the Military Assistance Program. She served the French Navy as Sakalave (F-720). She was scrapped in 1960.

== See also ==
- List of Escorteurs of the French Navy
