= Lamison, Alabama =

Unincorporated community in Alabama, United States

- Unincorporated community
- Location within the state of Alabama Lamison, Alabama (the United States)
- Coordinates: 32°7′16″N 87°34′0″W
- Country: United States
- State: Alabama
- County: Wilcox
- Elevation: 118 ft (36 m)
- Time zone: UTC-6 (Central (CST))
  - Summer (DST): UTC-5 (CDT)
- Area code: 334

Lamison is an unincorporated community in Wilcox County, Alabama, United States, located along Alabama State Route 5.

== Geography ==
Lamison is located at 32.12125°N 87.56666°W and has an elevation of 118 feet (36 m).

== Notable person ==
- Leonard W. Thornhill, naval aviator who participated in the sinking of the Japanese aircraft carrier Shōhō and was posthumously awarded the Navy Cross. USS Thornhill (DE-195) was named in his honor.
