= USS Thornhill =

Cannon-class destroyer escort

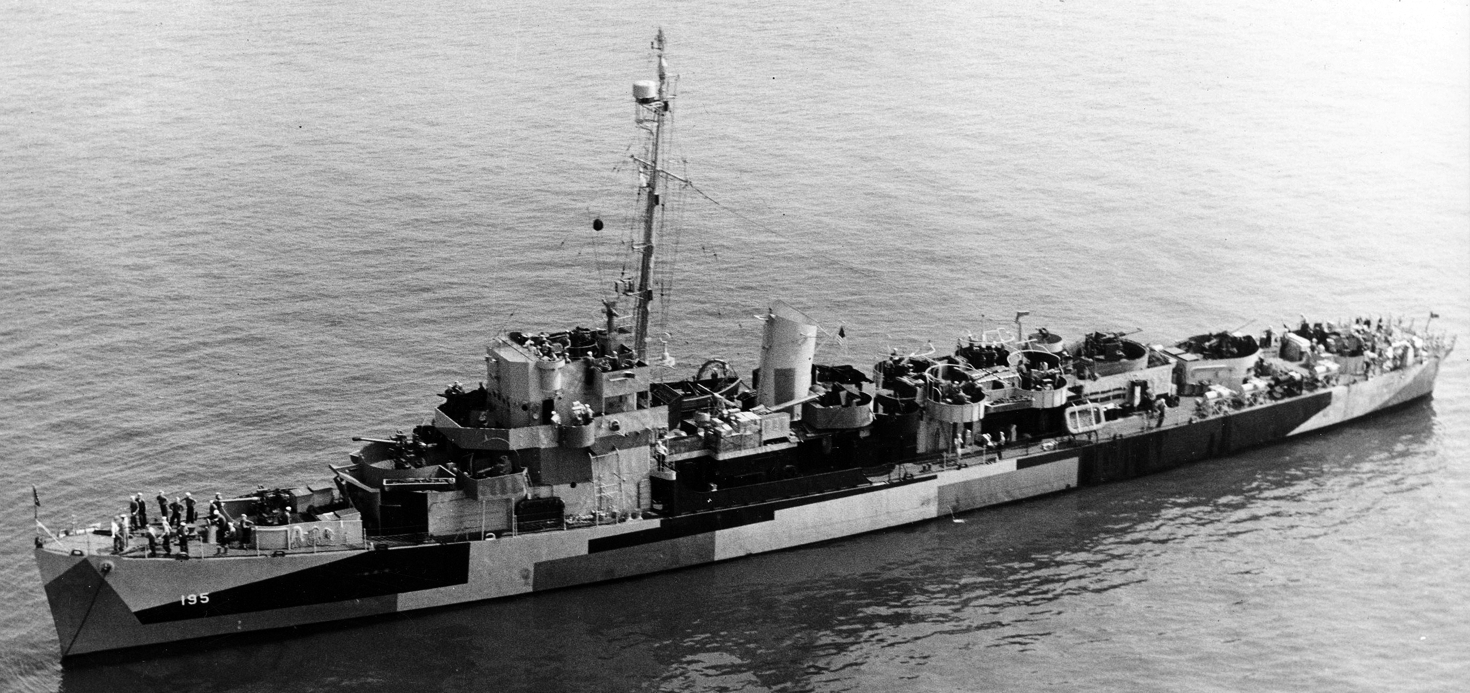

History

United States
- Name: USS Thornhill
- Namesake: Leonard W. Thornhill
- Builder: Federal Shipbuilding and Drydock Company, Newark, New Jersey
- Laid down: 7 October 1943
- Launched: 30 December 1943
- Commissioned: 1 February 1944
- Decommissioned: 17 June 1947
- Stricken: 26 March 1951
- Identification: DE-195
- Fate: Transferred to Italy, 10 January 1951

Italy
- Name: Aldebaran
- Acquired: 10 January 1951
- Stricken: 1976
- Identification: F 590
- Fate: Broken up, 1976

General characteristics
- Class & type: Cannon-class destroyer escort
- Displacement: 1,240 long tons (1,260 t) standard; 1,620 long tons (1,646 t) full
- Length: 306 ft (93 m) o/a; 300 ft (91 m) w/l
- Beam: 36 ft 10 in (11.23 m)
- Draft: 11 ft 8 in (3.56 m)
- Propulsion: 4 × GM Mod. 16-278A diesel engines with electric drive, 6,000 shp (4,474 kW), 2 screws
- Speed: 21 knots (39 km/h; 24 mph)
- Range: 10,800 nmi (20,000 km) at 12 kn (22 km/h; 14 mph)
- Complement: 15 officers and 201 enlisted
- Armament: 3 × single Mk.22 3"/50 caliber guns; 1 × twin 40 mm Mk.1 AA gun; 8 × 20 mm Mk.4 AA guns; 3 × 21-inch (533 mm) torpedo tubes; 1 × Hedgehog Mk.10 anti-submarine mortar (144 rounds); 8 × Mk.6 depth charge projectors; 2 × Mk.9 depth charge tracks

USS Thornhill (DE-195) was a Cannon-class destroyer escort in service with the United States Navy from 1943 to 1947. In 1951, the ship was transferred to the Italian Marina Militare and renamed Aldebaran (F 590). The ship remained in service until 1976 when she was sold for scrap.

== Namesake ==
Leonard W. Thornhill was born on 17 August 1915, in Lamison, Alabama. He was appointed to the U.S. Naval Academy on 19 June 1934, graduated on 2 June 1938, and was commissioned an ensign. After serving at sea on the USS Pennsylvania until September 1939 and the USS J. Fred Talbott until July 1940, he was transferred to Pensacola, Florida, for flight training. Thornhill received his naval aviator's wings on 23 January 1941, and soon thereafter reported for duty at the Naval Air Station Opa-locka, Florida.

Following another assignment ashore at San Diego, Thornhill joined carrier-based Torpedo Squadron (VT) 2 on 13 August 1941. After the Japanese attack on Pearl Harbor, Thornhill served with his ship, USS Lexington, during the first month of the war, patrolling the Johnston–Palmyra–Oahu triangle against possible enemy incursions. In February and March, he participated in the carrier's offensive patrols in the Coral Sea and in the attacks on Japanese installations at Salamaua and Lae located on the northern coast of New Guinea. Early May found Lexington patrolling the Coral Sea after two weeks of upkeep in Pearl Harbor.

During the Battle of the Coral Sea Thornhill piloted one of the 12 Douglas TBD Devastator torpedo bombers launched during mid-morning on 7 May to seek out and destroy Japanese forces converging on the Australian base at Port Moresby. At 11:35, VT-2 encountered the light carrier Japanese aircraft carrier Shōhō and immediately launched a well coordinated attack in conjunction with Bombing Squadron 2 (VB-2). While VB-2 took some of the fighter pressure off the torpedo bombers, Thornhill and his comrades split formation and attacked the carrier from both directions astern. All 12 planes made their runs and drops successfully and without loss to themselves. The squadron claimed nine hits from 12 drops, one of which was credited to Thornhill. The coordinated attacks of VT-2 and VB-2 sank Shōhō, the first enemy carrier sunk by American forces in World War II.

The following day, Thornhill went aloft with VT-2 at 09:10 in search of the two remaining Japanese carriers, Shokaku and Zuikaku. After failing to encounter the ships at their supposed location, the squadron mates initiated a "box search" to find them. Sometime after 11:00, they found the Shokaku, At 11:42, VT-2 commenced its attack; and the carrier began a long, slow turn to the right which allowed each TBD-1 to make its "run without splitting across the stern." The attack ended just eight minutes later, and VT-2 began the flight home claiming five hits on Shokaku, all of which proved later to be wishful thinking. Only the dive bombers succeeded in damaging the enemy carrier. During the return flight, VT-2 planes began to run low on fuel. All planes cut back power in order to make the flight most economically, even so, Thornhill could not make it. His plane ran out of fuel some 20 miles (32 km) short of home, and he had to ditch in the ocean. Though a destroyer went to their rescue, Thornhill and his crew perished at sea. For his contribution to the destruction of Shōhō he was posthumously awarded the Navy Cross.

== History ==
=== United States Navy (1943-1951) ===
Thornhill was laid down on 7 October 1943 at Newark, New Jersey, by the Federal Shipbuilding & Drydock Co.; launched on 30 December 1943; sponsored by Mrs. J. E. Thornhill, the mother of Lt. (jg.) Thornhill; and commissioned on 1 February 1944.

==== Battle of the Atlantic ====
The destroyer escort got underway on 18 February, held shakedown training out of Bermuda, and returned to New York exactly one month later. Thornhill served as a training ship at Norfolk, Virginia, during April. In May, she returned to New York to escort a part of Convoy UGS-42 to Norfolk. The 108-ship convoy sortied from Hampton Roads on 13 May, bound for North Africa. Thornhill arrived at Bizerte on 1 June and returned to New York on the 29th with a westbound convoy. Late in July, the destroyer escort screened another convoy to North Africa and returned to New York on 7 September 1944.

==== Pacific War ====
During the next eight months, Thornhill made four more escort voyages to England and France. On 9 June 1945, she and the other ships of Escort Division (CortDiv) 55 got underway for Guantánamo Bay and proceeded thence through the Panama Canal to the west coast of the United States. The division arrived at San Diego, California, on 9 July. CortDiv 55 stood out to sea five days later and arrived at Pearl Harbor on the 19th to join the Destroyer Force, Pacific Fleet.

Thornhill and her division departed with RMS Empress of Australia on 8 August, bound for the Marshalls, and reached Eniwetok the day after hostilities with Japan ceased. She remained in the Marshalls until 7 December when she and Wingfield headed back toward Hawaii. The two ships arrived at Pearl Harbor on 13 December 1945, and Thornhill served as a weather patrol ship there during January 1946. The destroyer escort sailed for home on 2 February and, after calling at San Diego, arrived at the Boston Navy Yard on 7 March.

== Aldebaran (F 590) ==
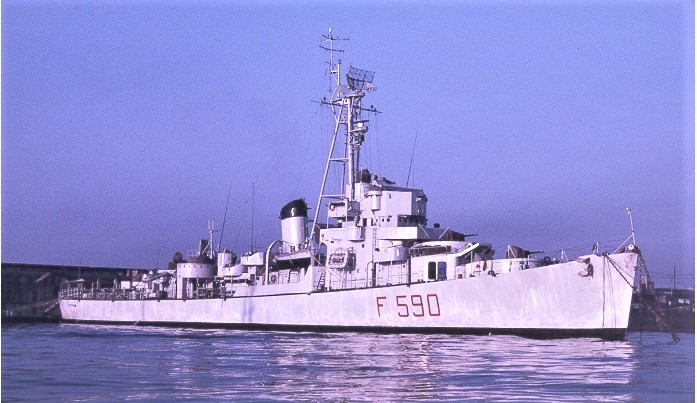
Thornhill as Aldebaran (F 590).

The next week she got underway for Green Cove Springs, Florida, to be inactivated. She was decommissioned on 17 June 1946 and assigned to the Atlantic Reserve Fleet. Thornhill was transferred to Italy under the Military Assistance Program on 10 January 1951 and was struck from the Navy List on 26 March that same year. She served the Italian Navy as Aldebaran (F 590) until she was stricken and broken up in 1976.
