= Lambda Tauri =

Triple star system in the constellation Taurus

λ Tauri
- Location of λ Tauri (circled)

Observation data Epoch J2000.0 Equinox ICRS
- Constellation: Taurus
- Right ascension: 04^{h} 00^{m} 40.81572^{s}
- Declination: +12° 29′ 25.2259″
- Apparent magnitude (V): +3.37 (- 3.54) - 3.91

Characteristics
- Spectral type: B3 V + A4 IV + K4
- U−B color index: −0.62
- B−V color index: −0.12
- Variable type: Algol

Astrometry
Radial velocity (R_{v})	+17.8 km/s
Proper motion (μ)	RA: −8.02 mas/yr Dec.: −14.42 mas/yr
Parallax (π)	6.74±0.17 mas
Distance	480 ± 10 ly (148 ± 4 pc)
Absolute magnitude (M_{V})	−2.45

Orbit
Primary	λ Tau A
Secondary	λ Tau B
Period (P)	3.952952845(81) d
Semi-major axis (a)	21.374 R_{☉} (0.09940 au; 14,870,000 km)
Eccentricity (e)	0.0
Inclination (i)	74.701±0.004°
Longitude of the node (Ω)	15±2 or 195±2°
Periastron epoch (T)	2,440,998.86069(35) HJD
Argument of periastron (ω) (secondary)	269±39°
Semi-amplitude (K_{1}) (primary)	55.51±0.28 km/s
Semi-amplitude (K_{2}) (secondary)	205.02 km/s

Orbit
Primary	λ Tau AB
Secondary	λ Tau C
Period (P)	33.02480±0.00028 d
Semi-major axis (a)	90.09 R_{☉} (0.4190 au; 62,680,000 km)
Eccentricity (e)	0.154
Inclination (i)	74.7°
Periastron epoch (T)	2,456,822.5±3.6 HJD
Argument of periastron (ω) (secondary)	269.22°
Semi-amplitude (K_{1}) (primary)	9.95 km/s

Details

λ Tau A
Mass	6.59 M_{☉}
Radius	5.69 R_{☉}
Luminosity	5,800 L_{☉}
Surface gravity (log g)	3.38 cgs
Temperature	23,000 K
Rotational velocity (v sin i)	85 km/s
Age	33.2±3.9 Myr

λ Tau B
Mass	1.80 M_{☉}
Radius	5.75 R_{☉}
Luminosity	128 L_{☉}
Temperature	9,570 K
Rotational velocity (v sin i)	76 km/s

λ Tau C
Mass	0.667 M_{☉}

Other designations
- Bibing, λ Tau, 35 Tau, BD+12 539, FK5 150, HD 25204, HIP 18724, HR 1239, SAO 93719

Database references
SIMBAD	data

Lambda Tauri (Latinized from λ Tauri), formally named Bibing, is a triple star system in the constellation Taurus. In 1848, the light from this system was found to vary periodically and it was determined to be an eclipsing binary system—the third such discovered. The components of this system have a combined apparent visual magnitude of +3.37 at its brightest, making it one of the brighter members of the constellation. Based upon parallax measurements from the Hipparcos mission, the distance to this system is approximately 480 light-years (150 parsecs).

== Nomenclature ==
Lambda Tauri (Latinized from λ Tauri, abbreviated λ Tau) is the star's Bayer designation. In the Calendarium of Al Achsasi Al Mouakket, this star was designated Sadr al Tauri, which was translated into Latin as Pectus Tauri, meaning "the bull chest".

In Chinese astronomy, this star is part of the constellation Bi (畢, Net), one of the lunar mansions; it is named Bibing (畢柄), the handle of the net. The IAU Working Group on Star Names adopted the name Bibing for λ Tauri Aa on 17 May 2026.

== System ==
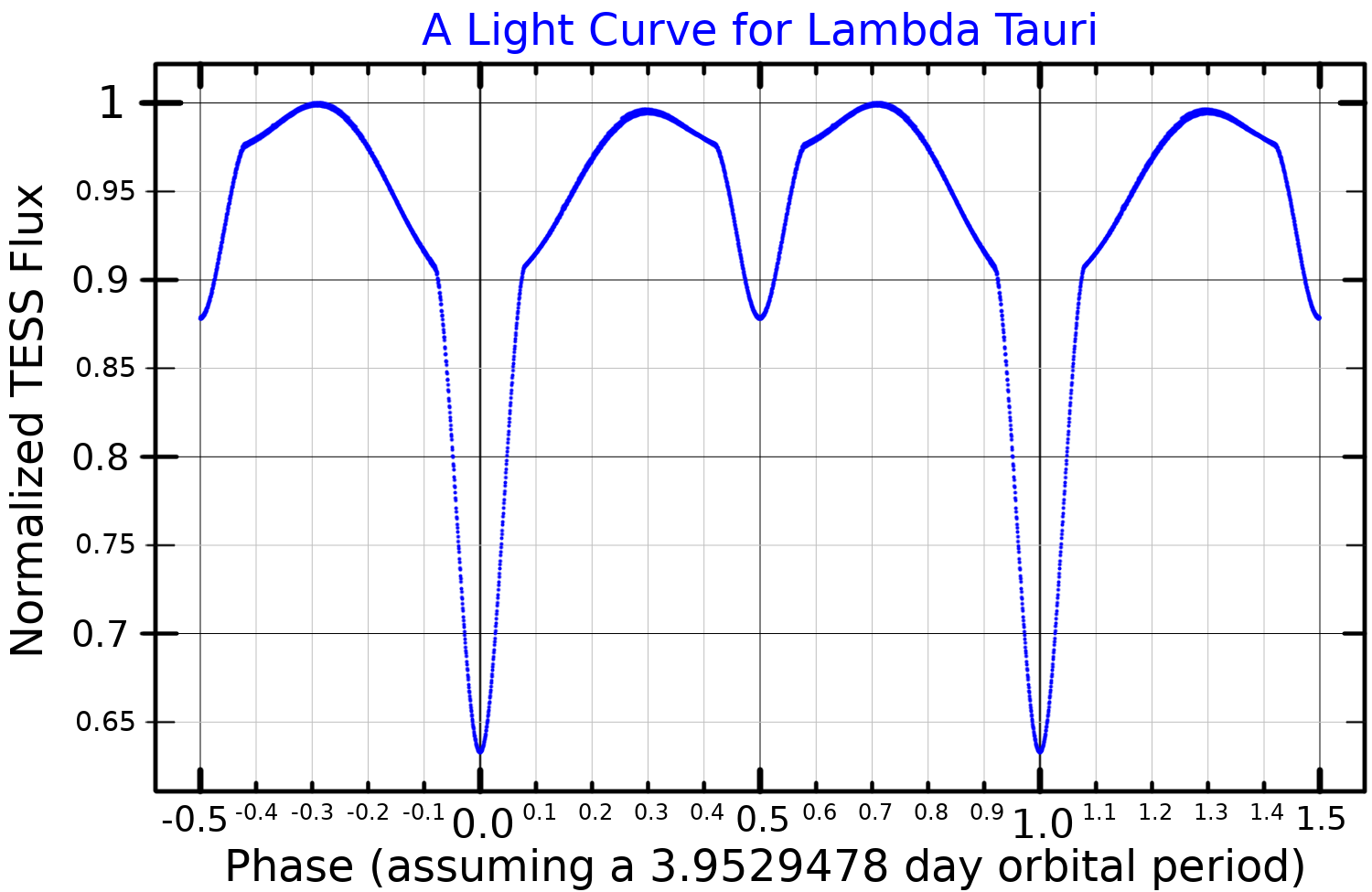
A light curve for Lambda Tauri, plotted from TESS data

The inner pair of this triple star system, Lambda Tauri AB, orbit around each other with a period of 3.952952845 d, likely following a circular path (with no eccentricity).Their orbital plane is inclined by 74.701° to the line of sight from the Earth, so it is being viewed from nearly edge on and the two stars form an Algol-like eclipsing binary system. The combined brightness of the pair varies from magnitude +3.37 to +3.91 as first one star and then the other pass in front of its companion. The primary member, λ Tau A, undergoes a decrease of 0.435±0.050 in magnitude during an eclipse, while the secondary component, λ Tau B, decreases by 0.09–0.10 in magnitude. The mean physical separation between these two stars is estimated at 21.374 times the radius of the Sun, or 0.09940 astronomical units.

The primary component, λ Tau A, has a stellar classification of B3 V, making this a massive B-type main sequence star. It has 6.59 times the mass of the Sun and 5.69 times the Sun's radius. This star is the brightest member of the system, radiating about 5,800 times the luminosity of the Sun from its photosphere at an effective temperature of 23,000 K, which gives it a blue-white hue common to the B-type stars. Lambda Tauri A is rotating rapidly with a projected rotational velocity of 85 km/s. It, along with δ Librae, were the first stars on which rotational line broadening was observed, by Frank Schlesinger in 1909.

The spectrum of λ Tau A shows an under abundance of carbon relative to the norm for this category of star. A possible explanation for this is a loss of mass by the star some time in the past. An inner region of the star became depleted by the conversion of carbon into nitrogen during the nuclear fusion process, and this region was later exposed when the outer envelope of the star was lost. Alternatively, the star may have undergone a period of convective mixing, bringing the carbon-depleted material to the surface. However, the cause of such a fully convective behavior in a main sequence star of this mass is unclear.

The secondary component, λ Tau B, has a stellar classification of A4 IV. It has 1.80 times the mass of the Sun and an inflated radius of 5.75 solar radii. It is distorted in a teardrop shape due to the tidal forces of the primary, and is (nearly) filling its Roche lobe. The star radiates 128 times the Sun's luminosity from its photosphere at an effective temperature of 9,570 K, which gives it a white hue common to the A-type stars. As with the primary, this star is spinning rapidly with a projected rotational velocity of 76 km/s. The side of the secondary facing the more massive star is being heated by an additional 1,440 K, which produces a rotational effect that causes the strength of the secondary's spectral lines to vary over the course of its orbit.

A conundrum with this system is the large radius of the secondary star. In stellar evolutionary terms, the more massive primary should be the first to reach the subgiant stage. Hence the enlarged radius of the secondary must be caused by a means other than the star's age. This suggests that the pair Lambda Tauri AB form a semidetached binary with the secondary filling its Roche lobe, giving it a distorted shape.

The third component, λ Tau C, has a mass of 0.667 solar masses and is likely to be a K4 main sequence star. It is orbiting the inner pair over a 33.025 day period with an eccentricity of 0.154. The orbital plane of this component is nearly coplanar with the orbit of Lambda Tauri AB, differing by no more than 7°. The orbit of this star causes perturbation effects on the orbit of the AB pair, resulting in periodic changes in their orbital eccentricity and other orbital elements.
