= 71 Tauri =

Star in the constellation Taurus

- Location of 71 Tauri (circled in red)

Observation data Epoch J2000.0 Equinox ICRS
- Constellation: Taurus
- Right ascension: 04^{h} 26^{m} 20.77082^{s}
- Declination: +15° 37′ 05.8841″
- Apparent magnitude (V): +4.48

Characteristics
- Evolutionary stage: main sequence
- Spectral type: F0 V
- U−B color index: +0.13
- B−V color index: +0.25
- Variable type: δ Sct

Astrometry
Radial velocity (R_{v})	+38.3 km/s
Proper motion (μ)	RA: +87.435 mas/yr Dec.: −20.978 mas/yr
Parallax (π)	21.3957±0.2511 mas
Distance	152 ± 2 ly (46.7 ± 0.5 pc)
Absolute magnitude (M_{V})	1.10

Details
Mass	1.94 M_{☉}
Radius	3.34 R_{☉}
Surface gravity (log g)	3.73 cgs
Temperature	7,543 K
Rotation	14.2 d
Rotational velocity (v sin i)	192 km/s
Age	966 Myr

Other designations
- 71 Tau, V777 Tau, BD+15°625, GC 5375, HD 28052, HIP 20713, HR 1394, SAO 93932

Database references
SIMBAD	data

71 Tauri is a suspected triple star system in the zodiac constellation Taurus, located 152 light years from the Sun. It is visible to the naked eye as a faint, yellow-white hued star with an apparent visual magnitude of +4.48. The star is moving further away from the Earth with a heliocentric radial velocity of +38 km/s. It is a member of the Hyades open cluster.

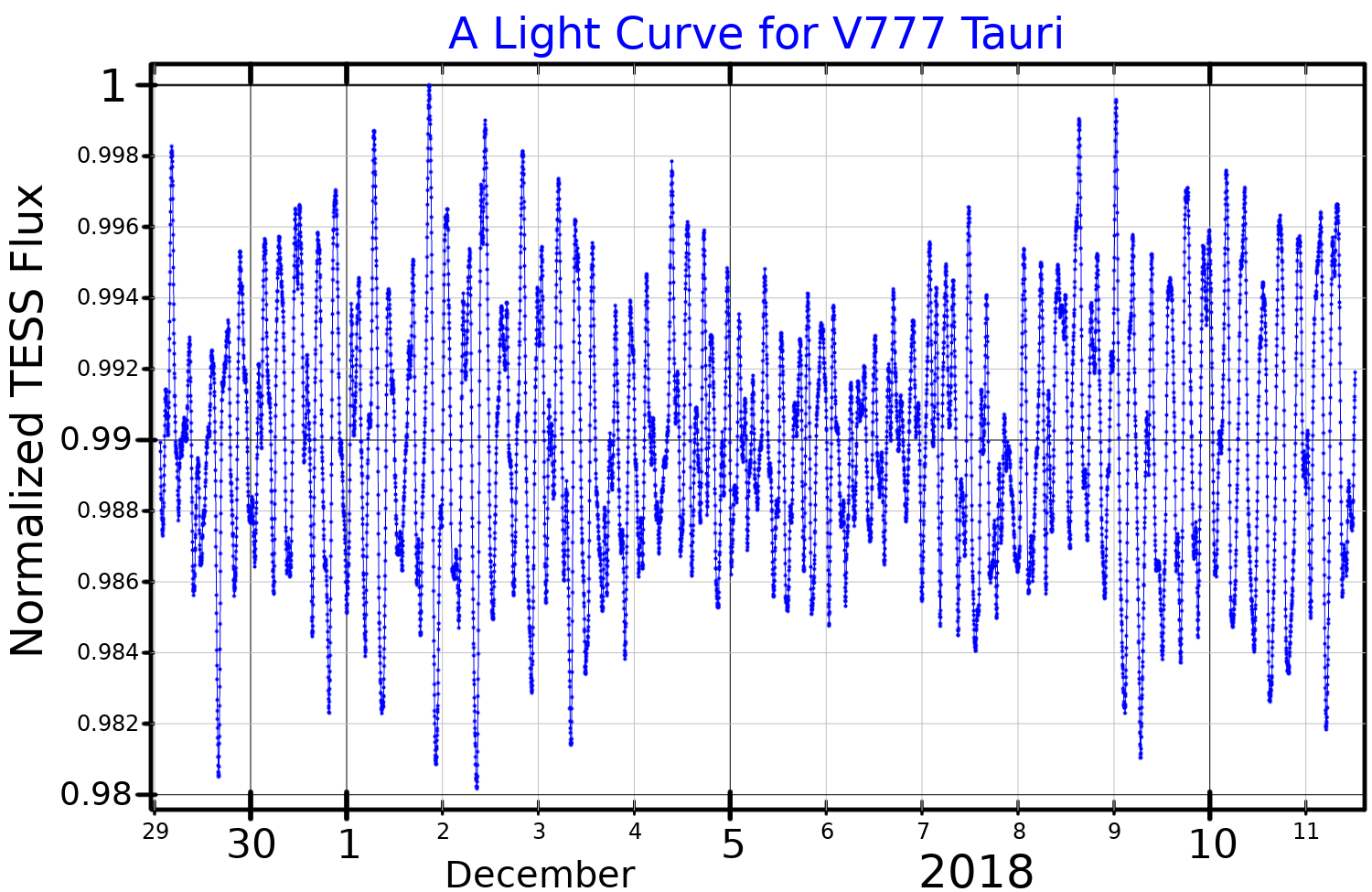
A light curve for V777 Tauri, plotted from TESS data

The primary component is an F-type main-sequence star with a stellar classification of F0 V. In 1979, Stephen Horan discovered that 71 Tauri is a variable star. It was given its variable star designation, V777 Tauri, in 1981. It is a Delta Scuti variable with an amplitude of 0.02 in magnitude and a frequency of 0.16 d^{−1}. This star has about 1.94 times the mass of the Sun and 3.34 times the Sun's radius. It has a projected rotational velocity of 192 km s^{−1}, for an estimated rotation period of 14.2 days. Extreme ultraviolet flares have been observed coming from this star's hot corona, and it is the second brightest X-ray source in the Hyades.
