= Net (Chinese constellation) =

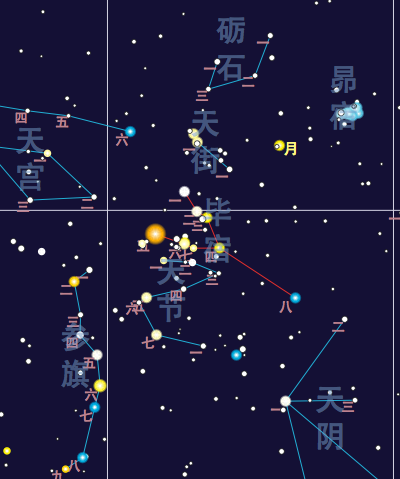
Bì Xiù map

The Net mansion (simplified Chinese: 毕宿; traditional Chinese: 畢宿; pinyin: Bìxiù) is one of the Twenty-eight mansions of the Chinese constellations. It is one of the western mansions of the White Tiger.

== Asterisms ==
English name	Chinese name	European constellation	Number of stars
Net	畢	Taurus	8
Whisper	附耳	Taurus	1
Celestial Street	天街	Taurus	2
Celestial Tally	天節	Taurus	8
Feudal Kings	諸王	Taurus	6
Celestial High Terrace	天高	Taurus	4
Interpreters of Nine Dialects	九州殊口	Eridanus	6
Five Chariots	五車	Auriga/Taurus	5
Pillars	柱	Auriga	9
Celestial Pier	天潢	Auriga	5
Pool of Harmony	咸池	Auriga	3
Celestial Gate	天關	Taurus	1
Banner of Three Stars	參旗	Orion	9
Imperial Military Flag	九斿	Taurus/Eridanus/Lepus	9
Celestial Orchard	天園	Eridanus/Phoenix	13
