= GN 04.32.8 =

Nebula in Taurus

Nebula
- Reflection nebula
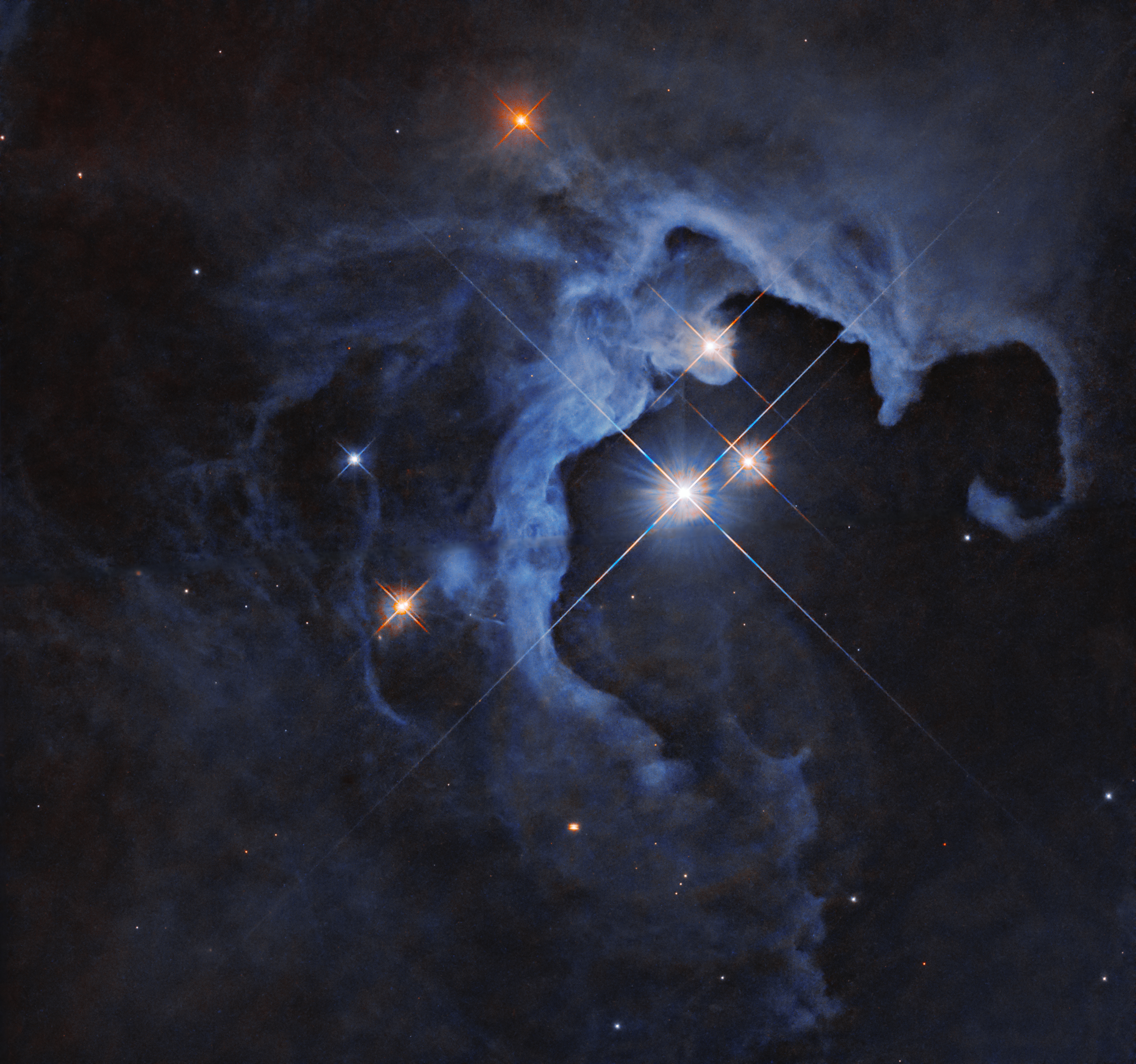
- GN 04.32.8 imaged by Hubble Space Telescope

Observation data: J2000.0 epoch
- Right ascension: 04^{h} 35^{m} 42.00^{s}
- Declination: +22° 53′ 60.0″
- Distance: 480 ly
- Constellation: Taurus
- Designations: DG 41, GN 04.32.8, Magakian 77, Bernes 83

GN 04.32.8 (DG 41) is a reflection nebula located in the Taurus molecular cloud, a prominent region of star formation approximately 480 light-years from Earth in the constellation of Taurus. The nebula is illuminated by a cluster of young, hot stars, including the central T Tauri star system, and features a prominent protoplanetary disk associated with an embedded protostar, making it a valuable site for studying early stages of planetary formation.

At its core lies a triple star system comprising the variable star HP Tauri and the gravitationally bound companions HP Tau G2, and HP Tau G3.

== Observation ==
GN 04.32.8 has been observed as part of broader surveys of the Taurus molecular cloud since the mid-20th century, but gained prominence through high-resolution imaging by the NASA's Hubble Space Telescope. A detailed image captured by Hubble's Wide Field Camera 3 was released as the Hubble Picture of the Week on 30 June 2025, highlighting the nebula's intricate dust lanes and stellar content.
