= HD 150193 =

Young binary star system in the constellation Ophiuchus

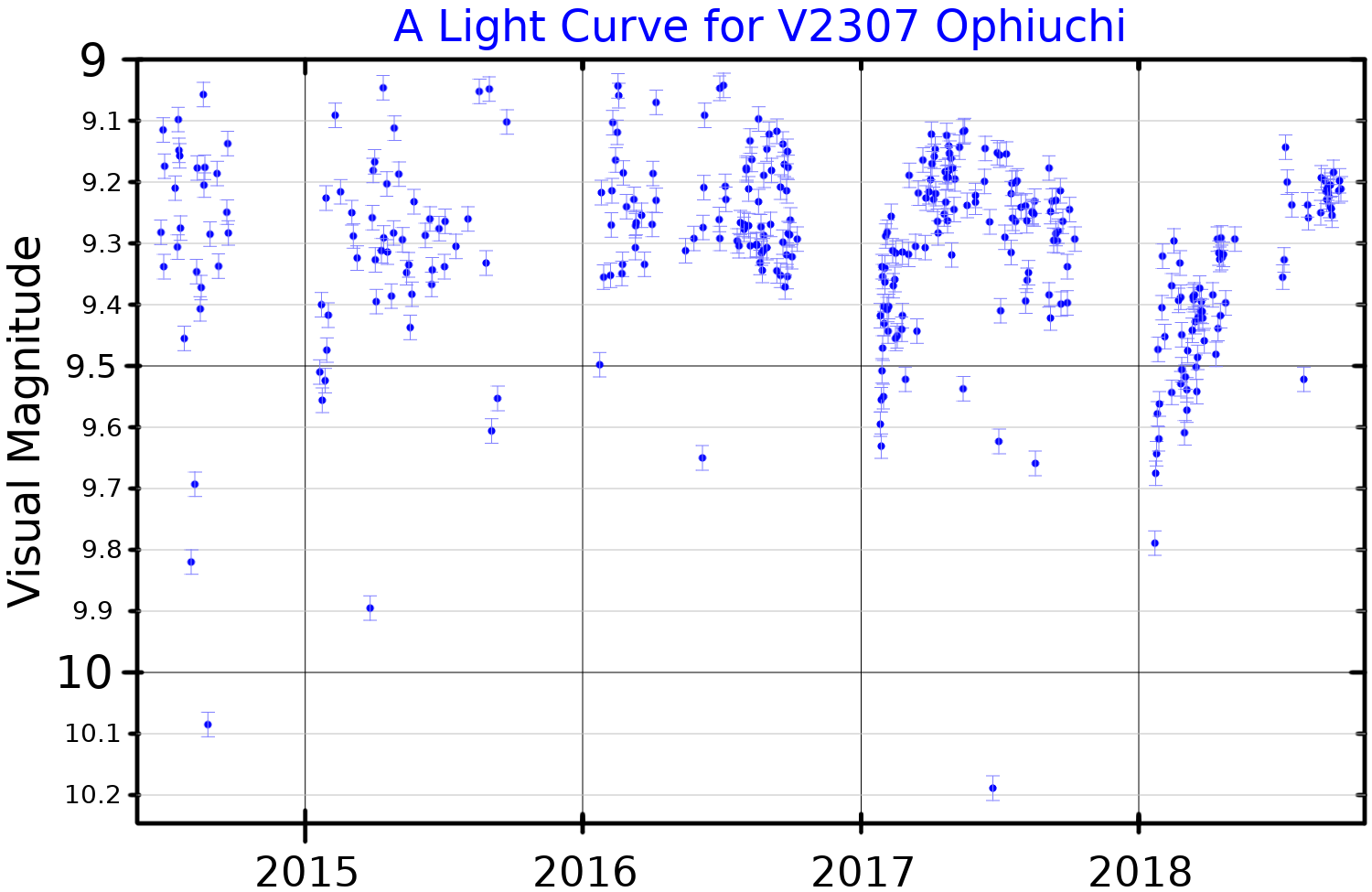
- A visual band light curve for V2307 Ophiuchi, plotted from ASAS-SN data

Observation data Epoch J2000 Equinox ICRS
- Constellation: Ophiuchus
- HD 150193A
- Right ascension: 16^{h} 40^{m} 17.9243^{s}
- Declination: −23° 53′ 45.193″
- Apparent magnitude (V): 8.79
- HD 150193B
- Right ascension: 16^{h} 40^{m} 17.8688^{s}
- Declination: −23° 53′ 45.966″
- Apparent magnitude (V): 12.3

Characteristics

HD 150193A
- Spectral type: A1Ve
- Variable type: Orion

HD 150193B
- Spectral type: F9Ve
- Variable type: T Tau

Astrometry

HD 150193A
Proper motion (μ)	RA: −4.935 mas/yr Dec.: −19.046 mas/yr
Parallax (π)	6.6313±0.0211 mas
Distance	492 ± 2 ly (150.8 ± 0.5 pc)

HD 150193B
Proper motion (μ)	RA: −9.247 mas/yr Dec.: −18.250 mas/yr
Parallax (π)	6.7543±0.1032 mas
Distance	483 ± 7 ly (148 ± 2 pc)

Position (relative to HD 150193A)
Component	HD 150193B
Angular distance	1.10±0.03″
Position angle	225.0±0.8°
Projected separation	166 AU

Details

HD 150193A
Mass	2.2 M_{☉}
Radius	2.0 R_{☉}
Luminosity	91.8±1.1 L_{☉}
Surface gravity (log g)	4.11 cgs
Temperature	9,000 K
Rotation	1.317 d
Rotational velocity (v sin i)	100 km/s
Age	7^{+2}_{−1} Myr

HD 150193B
Mass	1.2±0.2 M_{☉}
Luminosity	1.35 L_{☉}
Temperature	6,166 K
Age	>10 Myr

Other designations
- CD−23°12887, HD 150193, HIP 81624, SAO 184536, GSC 06796-01287, 2MASS J16401792-2353452, V2307 Oph

Database references
SIMBAD	data

HD 150193 is a binary star system in the constellation of Ophiuchus. The primary star was identified as a Herbig Ae/Be star with a strong solar wind, losing approximately a tenth of solar mass per million years. It does host a very small debris disk, likely due to disk truncation by the nearby stellar companion. The disk is inclined 38±9° to the plane of sky. It appears to be highly evolved and asymmetric, with indications of flattening and grains growth.

The companion HD 150193B, is a T Tauri young star with a projected separation of 166 AU.

The binary HD 150193 is part of the Upper Scorpius subgroup of Scorpius–Centaurus star-forming region.
