= NGC 2261 =

Reflection nebula in the constellation Monoceros

Reflection nebula
- Variable Nebula
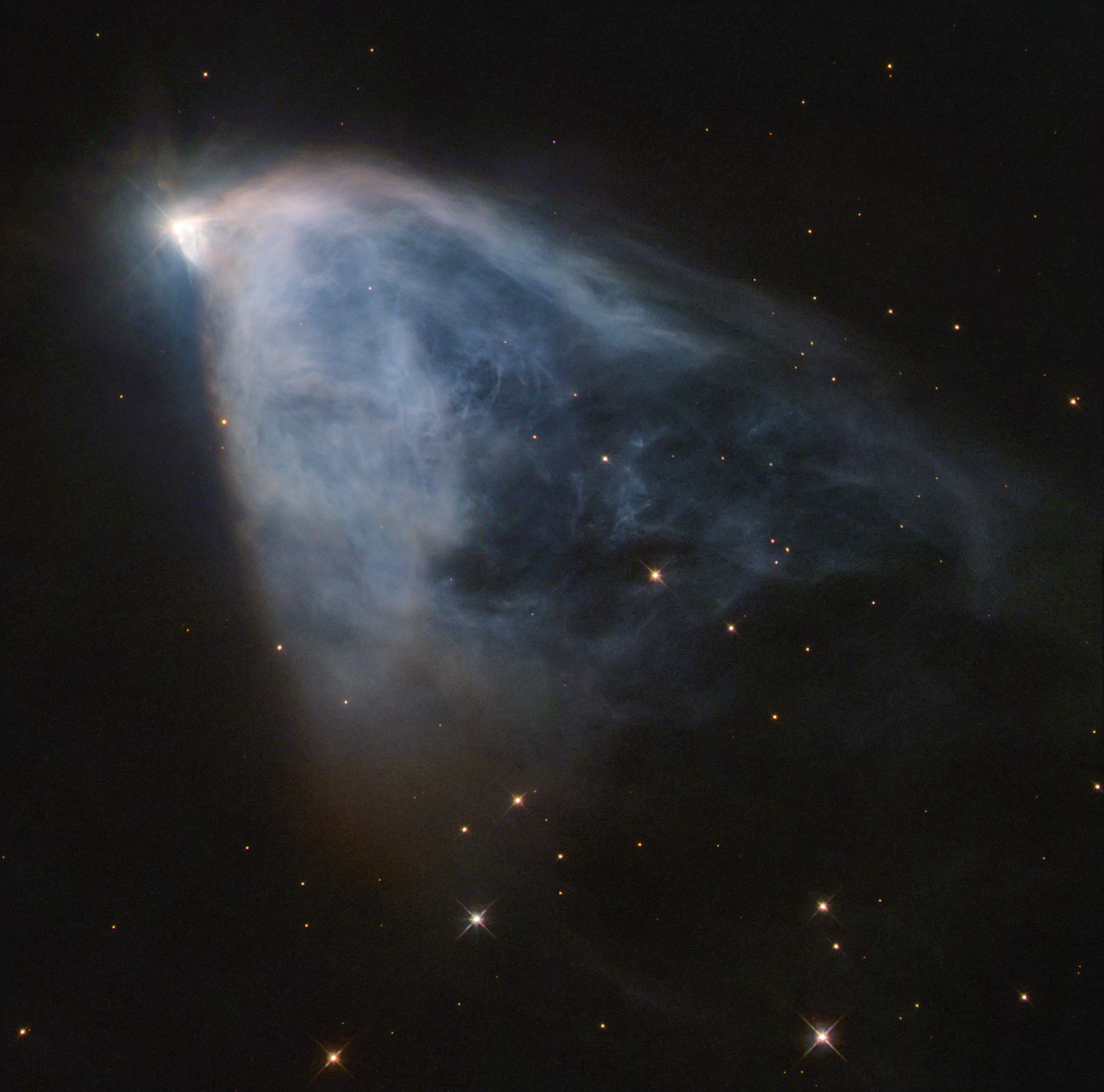
- An image of NGC 2261 by the Hubble Space Telescope; Credit: HST/NASA/JPL/Judy Schmidt

Observation data: J2000.0 epoch
- Right ascension: 6^{h} 39^{m} 10^{s}
- Declination: +8° 45′
- Distance: 2,500 ly
- Apparent magnitude (V): 9.0
- Apparent dimensions (V): 2′
- Constellation: Monoceros

Physical characteristics
- Radius: ~0.5 ly
- Designations: Hubble's Variable Nebula, Caldwell 46

NGC 2261 (also known as Hubble's Variable Nebula or Caldwell 46) is a variable nebula located in the constellation Monoceros. The nebula is illuminated by the star R Monocerotis (R Mon), which is not directly visible itself.

== Observing history ==
The first recorded observation of the nebula was by William Herschel on 26 December 1783, being described as considerably bright and 'fan-shaped'. It had long been designated as H IV 2, after being the second entry of Herschel's class 4 category for nebulae and star clusters, in his catalogues of nebulae.

NGC 2261 was imaged as Palomar Observatory's Hale Telescope's first light by Edwin Hubble on January 26, 1949, some 20 years after the Palomar Observatory project began in 1928. Hubble had studied the nebula previously at Yerkes and Mt. Wilson. Hubble had taken photographic plates with the Yerkes 24-inch (60.96 cm) reflecting telescope in 1916. Plates were taken using the same telescope in 1908 by F.C. Jordan, allowing Hubble to use a blink comparator to search for any changes over time in the nebula.

NGC 2261 was imaged by the Hubble Space Telescope, and an image of the nebula was released in 1999.

A timelapse of NGC 2261 was taken over a period of 6 months by over 20 amateur astronomers at the Big Amateur Telescope from October 2021 – April 2022. In August 2022, the project was resumed as NGC 2261 came out from behind the Sun.

Timelapse of NGC 2261 over 6 months from the Big Amateur Telescope. Light 'ripples' can be seen propagating, at light speed, from the central star as it varies in intensity and illuminates the surrounding nebula

== Descriptions ==
The star R Monocerotis has lit up a nearby cloud of gas and dust, but the shape and brightness slowly changes visibly even in small telescopes over weeks and months, and the nebula looks like a small comet.

One explanation proposed for the variability is that dense clouds of dust near R Mon periodically block the illumination from the star. This casts a temporary shadow on the nearby clouds.

== See also ==
- NGC 1555
- New General Catalogue
