= IRAS 05437+2502 =

Reflection nebula

IRAS 05437 2502
Reflection nebula
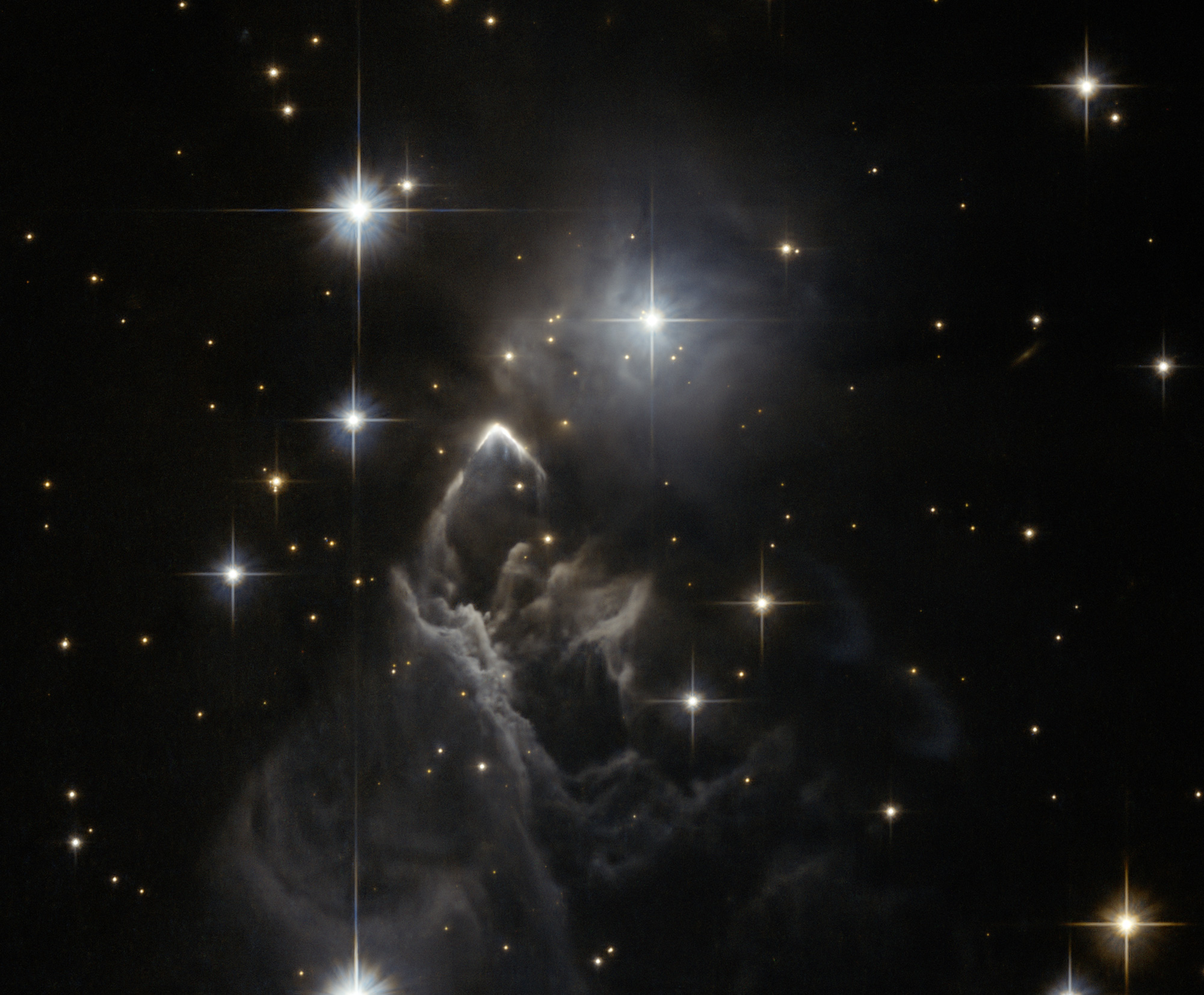
- IRAS 05437 2502, as taken by Hubble Space Telescope

Observation data: J2000 epoch
- Right ascension: 05^{h} 46^{m} 51.6^{s}
- Declination: +25° 03′ 45″
- Constellation: Taurus
- Designations: IRAS 05437+2502, IRAS Ghost Nebula

IRAS 05437+2502 is a reflection nebula in the constellation Taurus. Astronomers think that a young star coming from the nebula could have been traveling at 124,000 mph (200,000 km/h) and may of caused its distinctive "boomerang" shape when it passed through.
