= T Tauri =

Star in constellation Taurus

- Location of T Tauri (circled)

Observation data Epoch J2000 Equinox ICRS
- Constellation: Taurus
- Right ascension: 04^{h} 21^{m} 59.43445^{s}
- Declination: +19° 32′ 06.4182″
- Apparent magnitude (V): 9.3 - 13.5

Characteristics
- Spectral type: K0IV/Ve
- U−B color index: +0.80
- B−V color index: +1.22
- Variable type: T Tauri

Astrometry
Radial velocity (R_{v})	+24.6 km/s
Proper motion (μ)	RA: +15.51 mas/yr Dec.: −13.67 mas/yr
Parallax (π)	6.9290±0.0583 mas
Distance	471 ± 4 ly (144 ± 1 pc)

Orbit
Primary	T Tau N
Secondary	T Tau S
Period (P)	558+4 −5 yr
Semi-major axis (a)	0.793±0.004″
Eccentricity (e)	0.0
Inclination (i)	36.8+0.8 −0.7°
Longitude of the node (Ω)	136.5+0.6 −0.7°

Orbit
Primary	T Tau Sa
Secondary	T Tau Sb
Period (P)	27.29±0.40 yr
Semi-major axis (a)	84.36±0.77 mas
Eccentricity (e)	0.547±0.017
Inclination (i)	17.3±3.4°
Longitude of the node (Ω)	95.2±16.5°
Periastron epoch (T)	1995.87±0.35
Argument of periastron (ω) (secondary)	43.6±17.5°

Details

T Tau N
Mass	2.4±0.2 M_{☉}
Radius	2.89+0.14 −0.21[derived] R_{☉}
Luminosity	5.11+0.76 −0.66 L_{☉}
Temperature	5,112+99 −97 K

T Tau Sa
Mass	2.09±0.05 M_{☉}
Age	0.4 Myr

T Tau Sb
Mass	0.40±0.05 M_{☉}

Other designations
- T Tau, AG+19°341, BD+19°706, HBC 35, HD 284419, HH 355, HIP 20390, VDB 28

Database references
SIMBAD	data

T Tauri is a trinary variable star in the constellation Taurus, the prototype of the T Tauri stars. It was discovered in October 1852 by John Russell Hind. T Tauri appears from Earth amongst the Hyades cluster, not far from ε Tauri, but it is actually 318 light-years behind it and not a member of the cluster. The cloud to the west of the system is NGC 1555, known more commonly as Hind's Variable Nebula.

Although this system is considered to be the prototype of T Tauri stars, a later phase in a protostar's formation, it is a very atypical T Tauri star.

== Orbital characteristics and mass ==
The system has three stars: T Tauri North (T Tau N), T Tauri South A (T Tau Sa), and T Tauri South B (T Tau Sb). T Tau N is estimated to be approximately 300 AU away from the southern binary, with the separation of the binary believed to be approximately 7 AU with an orbital period of 27.2±0.7 years. The orbit of T Tau N about the southern binary is poorly constrained, with estimates of the period ranging from 400 years to 14,000 years as of 2020. T Tau N has a mass of ~2.1 M_{☉}, T Tau Sa is estimated to be 2.0–2.3 M_{☉}, and T Tau Sb is estimated to be approximately 0.4–0.5 M_{☉}.

== Variability and optical extinction ==
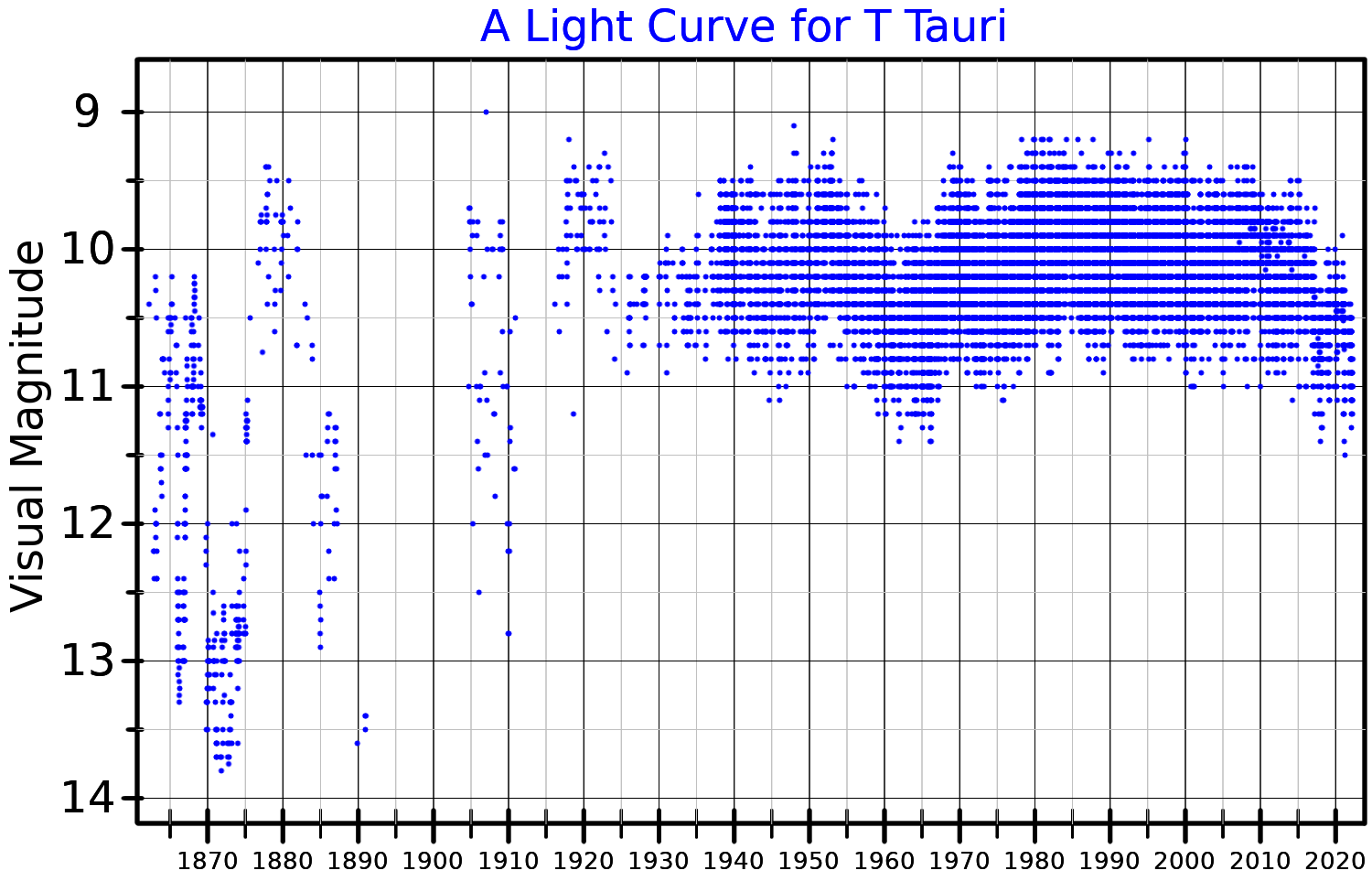
A 160 year long visual band light curve for T Tauri, plotted from AAVSO data

The southern binary is visible mainly in infrared, which is likely due to a circumbinary ring that is blocking the optical light (if there is any optical light leaking through, it must be at a magnitude of less than 19.6), while the accretion disk of T Tau N is believed to be nearly perpendicular to our line of sight, thus allowing us to see T Tau N in the optical.

The southern binary's brightness varies dramatically over seemingly short timescales in the infrared. It is believed this variability is due to both the matter in the circumbinary ring not being uniform, thus varying the light let through as it orbits the binary, and due to the individual components of the binary flaring up as they accrete matter. It is unknown which mechanism contributes the most to the variability.

The T Tau S system is seen moving towards the north-west and two works predicted that the circumbinary ring around T Tau S will move in front of T Tau N within 100 years. Based on AAVSO observations it was found that between 2015 and 2024 the star did fade by around 2 magnitudes. This is interpreted as the beginning of the great dimming of T Tau N. The dimming will last 60 to 70 years or more and T Tau N might disappear in the optical when the dense mid-plane of the ring moves in front of T Tau N.

== Outflow system ==
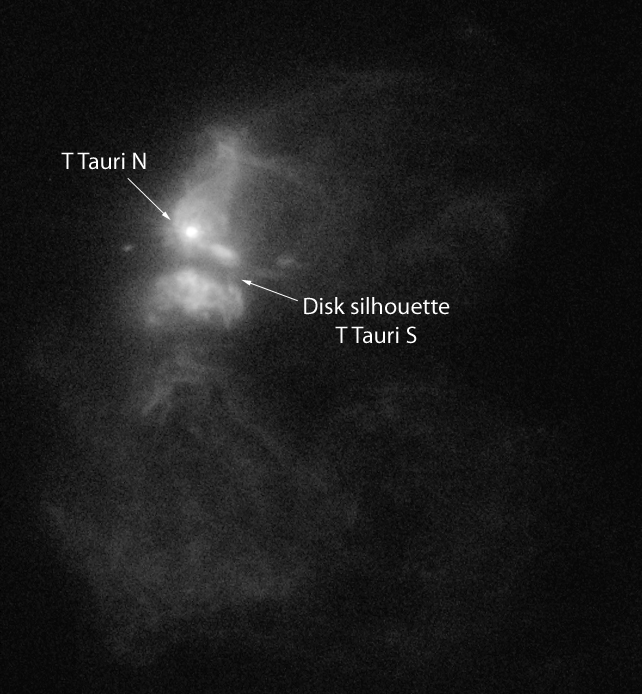
Hubble image of T Tauri N and the silhouette of the circumbinary ring around T Tauri S. Image was taken in 2005 in ultraviolet.

All three stars are in their T Tauri phase. During this phase, a star does not undergo nuclear fusion within its core; it shines due to the residual heat given off by its collapse. This causes a T Tauri star to vary in brightness over the course of weeks or months as they accrete matter. An important mechanic in star formation are the jets that are formed by the accretion, which function similarly to the jets of a quasar or an active galactic nucleus (AGN). These jets form due to the magnetic fields formed in the accretion disk, and as a side effect, they carry away excess angular momentum from the star. Without this mechanism, a star would not be able to accrete to more than 0.05 M_{☉}.

As of 2020, T Tau Sb is passing through the plane of the T Tau S circumbinary ring, and is currently dimming as the ring blocks its light.

The T Tauri system has been of particular interest to astronomers because it is by no means a typical T Tauri star. Specifically, it appears that T Tau N is actually supposed to still be an embedded protostar, but it was likely ejected from the dense cloud it was born in sometime in the past few thousand years. It is almost certainly still gravitationally bound to the other two stars. Its spectra is exactly that of a Classic T Tauri Star (CTTS), but evolutionary speaking it is not a T Tauri star.

The complex outflow system created by the stars is poorly understood, particularly in how it evolves over time. It is believed there are two bipolar outflows, with one coming from T Tau N, and the other coming from T Tau S. Since the two stars of T Tau S are so close, their individual outflows appear to either merge or T Tau Sb does not produce much of an outflow. The two outflows seem to be interacting somewhat, and it is believed this interaction will only become more intense in the future.

== Surrounding nebulosity ==
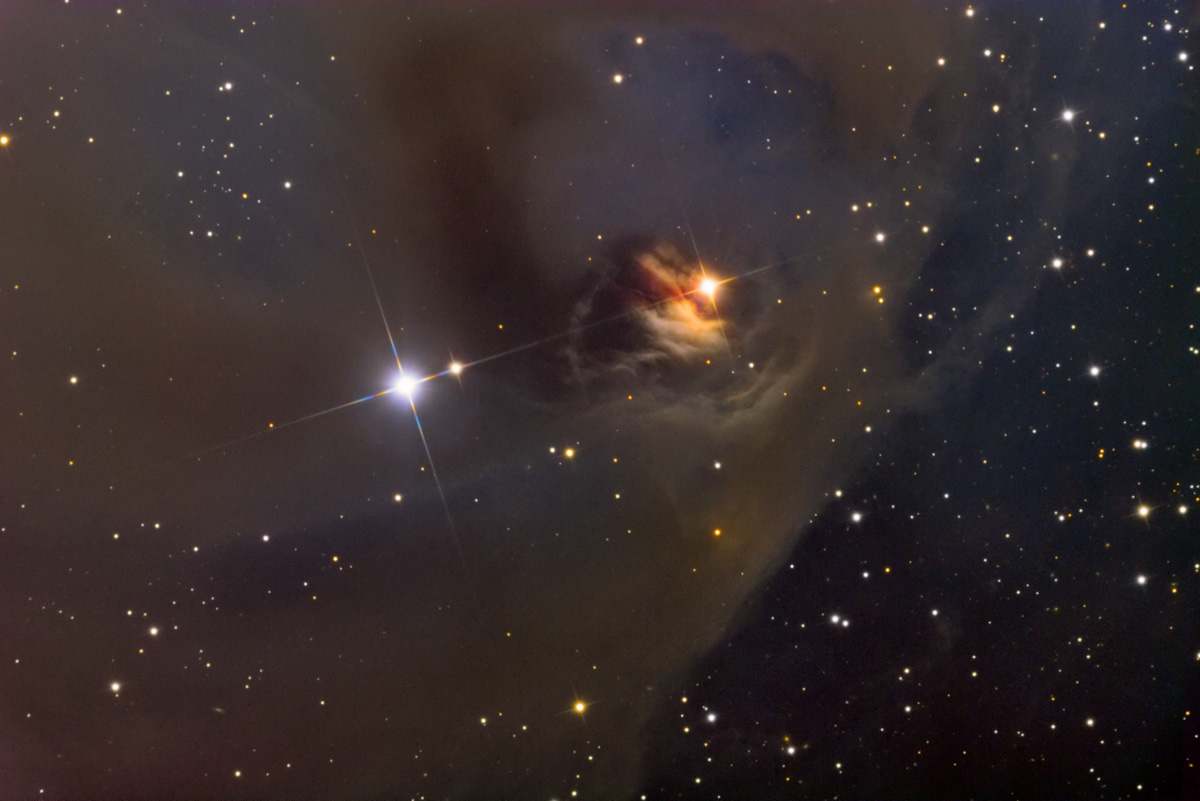
A widefield image showing the reflection nebula and clouds of dust. Credit: Adam Block/Mount Lemmon SkyCenter/University of Arizona.

Surrounding the system are three distinct Herbig-Haro objects. These are patches of nebulosity caused by the outflows interacting with the interstellar medium. They can be thought of as shock fronts for the jets as the fast moving material slams into the cold gas and dust surrounding the system.

The most noticeable nebulosity is the NGC 1555 cloud, known as Hind's Variable Nebula, only an arcminute west of T Tauri. This was the nebulosity first discovered by Hind in 1852, which is now known to be a reflection nebula due to the spectra being very similar to that of T Tauri itself. It is thought that the nebula's brightness varies due to material interposing occasionally between T Tauri and the reflection nebula.

The darker nebulosity is not technically part Hind's Variable Nebula, but it is part of the same cloud, and most catalogues consider them the same object. Various designations of this cloud are GC 839, HH 155, vdB 28, Ced 32b, SH 2-238, GN 04.18.9, and BDN176.28-20.89.

HH155 appears to be part of the NGC 1555 cloud, and is in fact a patch of emission nebulosity emanating from the blue-shifted east-west outflow from T Tau N. It stretches all the way to NGC 1555, and causes the reflection nebulosity to have some faint, in-situ forbidden line emission, which is produced by the fast-moving outflow interacting with the material at rest within NGC 1555.

HH255 is nebulosity much closer to the star system itself, otherwise known as Burnham's Nebula (also known as Ced 32c). It is another patch of emission nebulosity, likely caused by the outflows of the individual stars interacting and the outflows escaping the dense inner regions of the star system.

When Sherburne Wesley Burnham used the new 36" Great Lick Refractor in 1890 to find Hind's Nebula, which had been intermittently missing since the 1860s, he mistakenly inspected T Tauri itself rather than the area immediately west, and was successful in finding a nebula. When he noticed the description of Hind's Nebula did not match what he was seeing, he asked his colleague Edward Emerson Barnard to take a look since he had more experience with nebulosity and finer eyes. Barnard discovered another nebula, approximately an arcminute south-west of T Tauri and about an arcminute in diameter. This nebula Barnard found was temporarily called Barnard's Nebula until it was realized to be Hind later in the decade, and the nebulosity found around T Tauri was named Burnham's Nebula. This would be the first ever discovered Herbig-Haro object, although the object class would not be coined until 1953.

HH355 is a so-called "giant outflow" that reaches nearly 1.5pc away from the star system, discovered in 1997. This outflow is unusually large, possibly explained by the ejection of T Tau N from a closer, chaotic orbit with T Tau Sa and Sb many thousands of years ago. The patches are easily observed using the H-Alpha emission line, and by measuring the Doppler Shift of the two lobes, it appears they originated from the T Tau system. The lobes, referred to as HH355 North and HH355 South, each have three major patches (totaling six overall). The northern lobe has patches A, B, and C; the southern lobe has patches D, E, and F. The patches were seemingly created in pairs, with patches A and F being created 5000 years ago, B and E 900 years later, and C and D 900 years after that (assuming a tangential velocity of 150 km/s, which is a fairly common outflow velocity). After the last pair was created, a period of relative quiescence followed.

== Surrounding disks ==
As typical for the young stars, all three stars of T Tauri system are surrounded by a compact disks trimmed by star-star interaction. The disk around T Tauri N has a gap around 12 AU radius, indicating a presence of orbiting Saturn-mass planet within a gap.

The T Tauri planetary system
Companion (in order from star)	Mass	Semimajor axis (AU)	Orbital period (days)	Eccentricity	Inclination (°)	Radius
T Tauri N protoplanetary disk	24±4 AU				25.2±1.1°	—
T Tauri Sa protoplanetary disk	3.9±0.1 AU				52.8±0.6°	—
T Tauri Sb protoplanetary disk	3.2±0.3 AU				63.2±0.9°	—
T Tauri S circumbinary ring	60–80 AU				>80°	—

== Struve's Lost Nebula ==
The nebula NGC 1554 (Ced 32a) is believed to be associated with T Tauri. In the 1860s, Hind's nebula had faded from view for nearly all astronomers on Earth, including Hind himself, but Otto Wilhelm von Struve, having the third most powerful telescope in the world at the time, could still see it. In 1868, Struve lost the nebula, but found a new patch of nebulosity approximately four arcminutes west that he believed to be distinct from Hind's Nebula. He did not bother properly reporting this due to his lack of interest in nebulae, and instead wrote privately to d'Arrest, who would publish the finding. Over the course of the next 10–20 years, Struve's Nebula faded from view, and Hind's Nebula came back into view of most astronomers at the same time. It is likely Struve truly did observe something, especially considering that d'Arrest confirmed it, but as of 2022 there is no agreed explanation for the cause of this phenomenon.

The exact dynamics of the outflow system of T Tauri, particularly its evolution, is poorly understood. It is possible some sort of interaction between the outflows in the past may have caused the phenomena that Struve observed, but more data on at least the orbital constraints of T Tau N and how the outflows interact currently will be needed before any concrete theory can be reached. More likely than not, T Tau N underwent an ejection from the southern binary T Tau S into an eccentric and large orbit a few thousand years ago (based on the age of the HH 355 lobes), and Struve's Nebula may have been related somehow, but this is purely speculative.

== See also ==
- List of stars in Taurus
- P Cygni profile
- Hind's Variable Nebula
- Struve's Lost Nebula
