= NGC 1514 =

Planetary nebula in the constellation Taurus

Emission nebula
- Planetary nebula
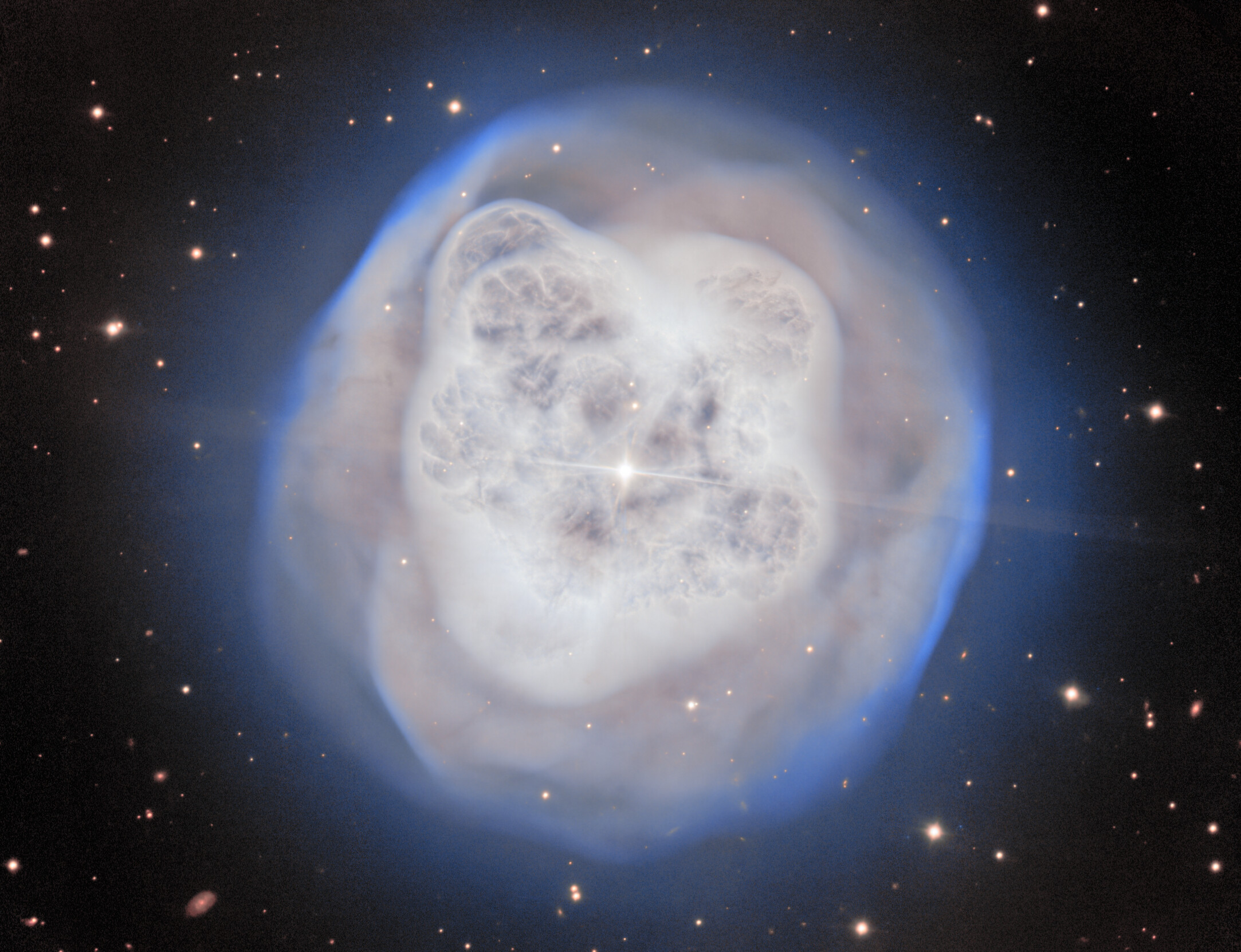
- Image of NGC 1514 taken by the Gemini telescope located on the summit of Maunakea in Hawai‘i.

Observation data: J2000 epoch
- Right ascension: 04^{h} 09^{m} 16.98559^{s}
- Declination: +30° 46′ 33.4709″
- Distance: 1,520 ly (470 pc) ly
- Apparent magnitude (V): 10.9; 9.4 (HD 281679)
- Apparent dimensions (V): 2.2′
- Constellation: Taurus

Physical characteristics
- Radius: 0.65 ly

NGC 1514 is a planetary nebula located in the zodiac constellation of Taurus. It is commonly known as the Crystal Ball Nebula. This nebula is located at a distance of around 1520 light years (455 parsecs) away from Earth. it is positioned to the north of the star Psi Tauri along the border of the constellation Perseus.

NGC 1514 was discovered by William Herschel on November 13, 1790. He described it as "a most singular phenomenon" and forced him to rethink his ideas on the construction of the heavens. Up until this point Herschel was convinced that all nebulae consisted of masses of stars too remote to resolve, but now here was a single star "surrounded with a faintly luminous atmosphere". William Herschel would conclude: "Our judgement I may venture to say, will be, that the nebulosity about the star is not of a starry nature."

== Description ==
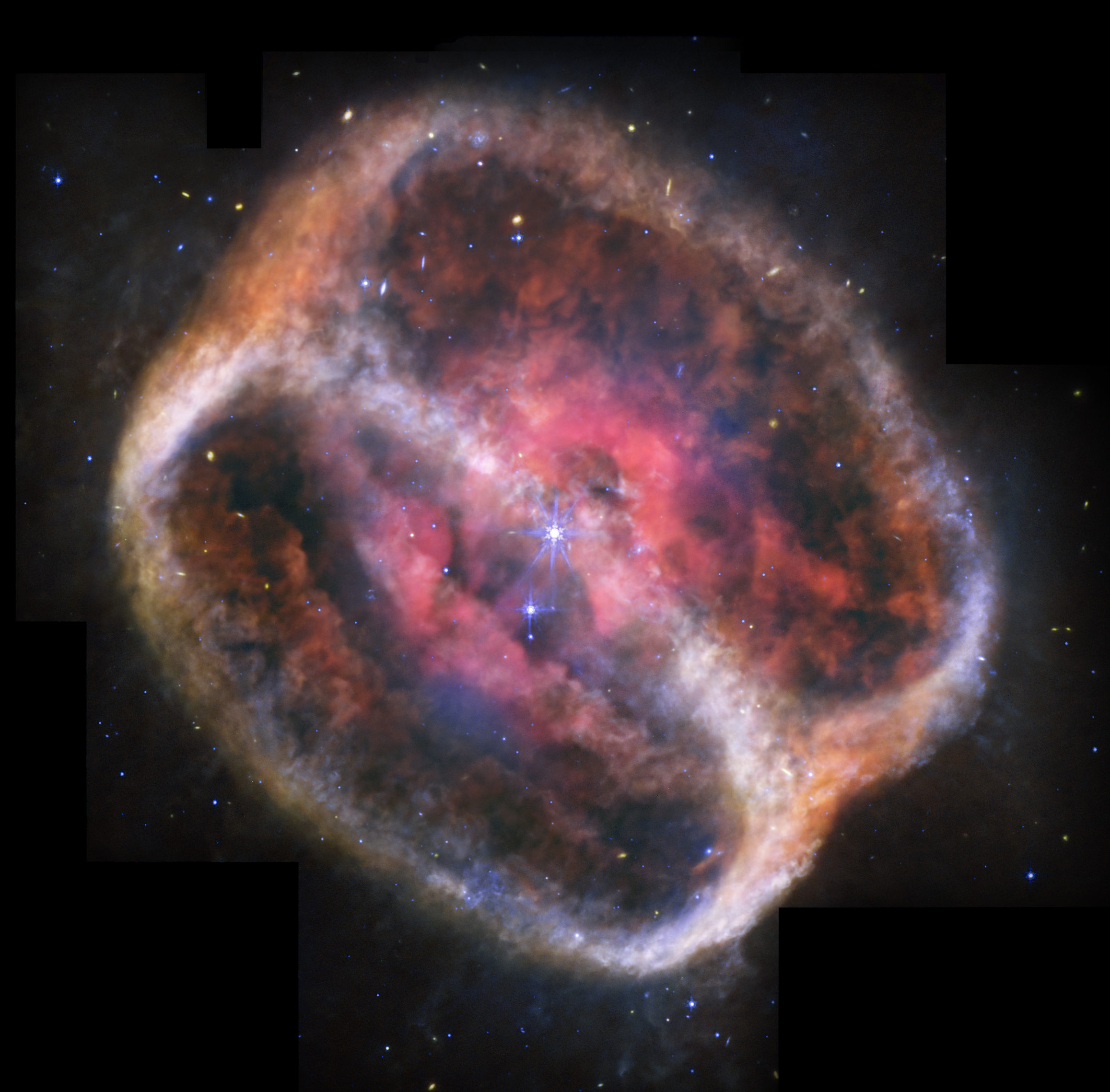
NGC 1514 imaged by the James Webb Space Telescope

The nebula has a radius of around 65″ and a faint halo that has a radius of 90″. NGC 1514 is a double-shell nebula that can be described as a bright roundish amorphous PN. It consists of an outer shell, an inner shell, and bright blobs. The inner shell appears to be distorted, but was likely originally spherical. It is a lumpy nebula composed of numerous small bubbles with a somewhat filamentary structure in the outer shell.

Infrared observations show a huge region of dust surrounds the planetary nebula, spanning 8.5 ly (2.6 pc). The combined mass of the gas and dust is estimated at 2.2±1.4 M_{☉} The ionized gas is moderately excited, and the electron temperature is estimated to be 15,000 K.

=== Infrared rings ===
The nebula contains a single pair of rings forming what appears to be a diabolo-like structure. These rings are similar to structures seen in the visible light to those seen in the Engraved Hourglass Nebula and the Southern Crab Nebula. These rings are extremely faint and only visible in the mid-infrared. Observations by the James Webb Space Telescope shows filamentary and clumpy details in the rings.

It is suggested the material from which the rings were formed was ejected during an early period of very heavy mass loss from the progenitor of the planetary nebula. It was then shaped by asymmetrical fast winds from the central binary pair.

== Formation ==
The nebula originated from a binary star system with the designation HD 281679 from the Henry Draper Catalogue. The bright, visible component is a giant star on the horizontal branch with a stellar classification of A0III, while the nebula-generating companion is now a hot, sub-luminous O-type star. The two were originally thought to have an orbital period on the order of 10 days, but observations of the system over years showed that their orbit is actually one of the longest known for any planetary nebula, with a period of about 9 years. Their orbital eccentricity is about 0.5.
