= McNeil's Nebula =

Variable nebula in the constellation Orion

Reflection nebula
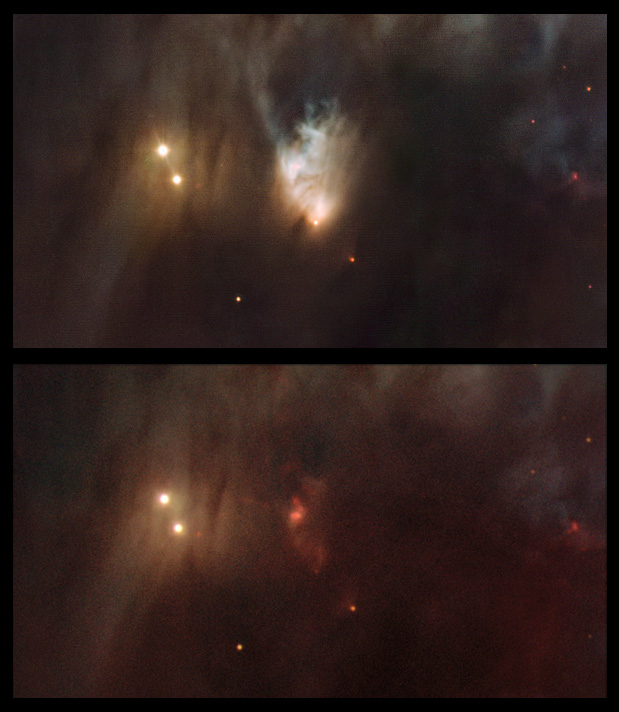
- McNeil's Nebula in 2011 (upper) and 2006 (lower)

Observation data: J2000 epoch
- Subtype: variable nebula
- Right ascension: 05^{h} 46^{m} 14^{s}
- Declination: −00° 05′ 48″
- Distance: 1,600 ly
- Apparent magnitude (V): 15-16
- Apparent diameter: 1.3 x 0.95 arc min
- Constellation: Orion
- Designations: EQ J054614-00058

McNeil's Nebula is a variable nebula discovered January 23, 2004 by Jay McNeil of Paducah, Kentucky. It is illuminated by the star V1647 Ori.

== Discovery ==
McNeil's Nebula is a cometary-type reflection nebula, illuminated by the reddish star V1647 Ori (also catalogued as IRAS 05436-0007) at its southern tip. The nebula did not appear in images taken before September 2003; it was discovered in 2004 by amateur astronomer Jay McNeil using a 3-inch telescope. University of Hawaii researcher Bo Reipurth's preliminary studies have determined that McNeil's Nebula appeared when V1647 Ori, a pre-main sequence star, experienced an outburst called a FU Orionis or EX Lupii type event. Most stars are believed to undergo such events, though they are rarely observed.

== Earlier images ==
The nebula has been identified on images taken by Evered Kreimer in October 1966, but not in various other images taken between 1951 and 1991. The nebula appears therefore to be very variable in luminosity, and is a reflection nebula illuminated by a variable star of some kind, or with the star's light being variably obscured for some reason. The nebula was not observed after 2004 until 2008, when it reappeared once more.

== 2018 disappearance ==
In November 2018 the Sky & Telescope website reported that the nebula had disappeared. On November 5, an observer using the 500-mm Gemini telescope at the Iowa Robotic Observatory reported its disappearance. Another observer using a 30-inch Dobsonian telescope on November 3 also failed to detect the nebula.
