= NGC 1554 =

Reflection nebula in the constellation Taurus

NGC 1554, Struve's Lost Nebula, is a list entry in the New General Catalogue of Nebulae compiled by John L. E. Dreyer. The nebula was discovered by the German-Russian astronomer Otto Wilhelm von Struve and confirmed by Heinrich Louis d'Arrest.

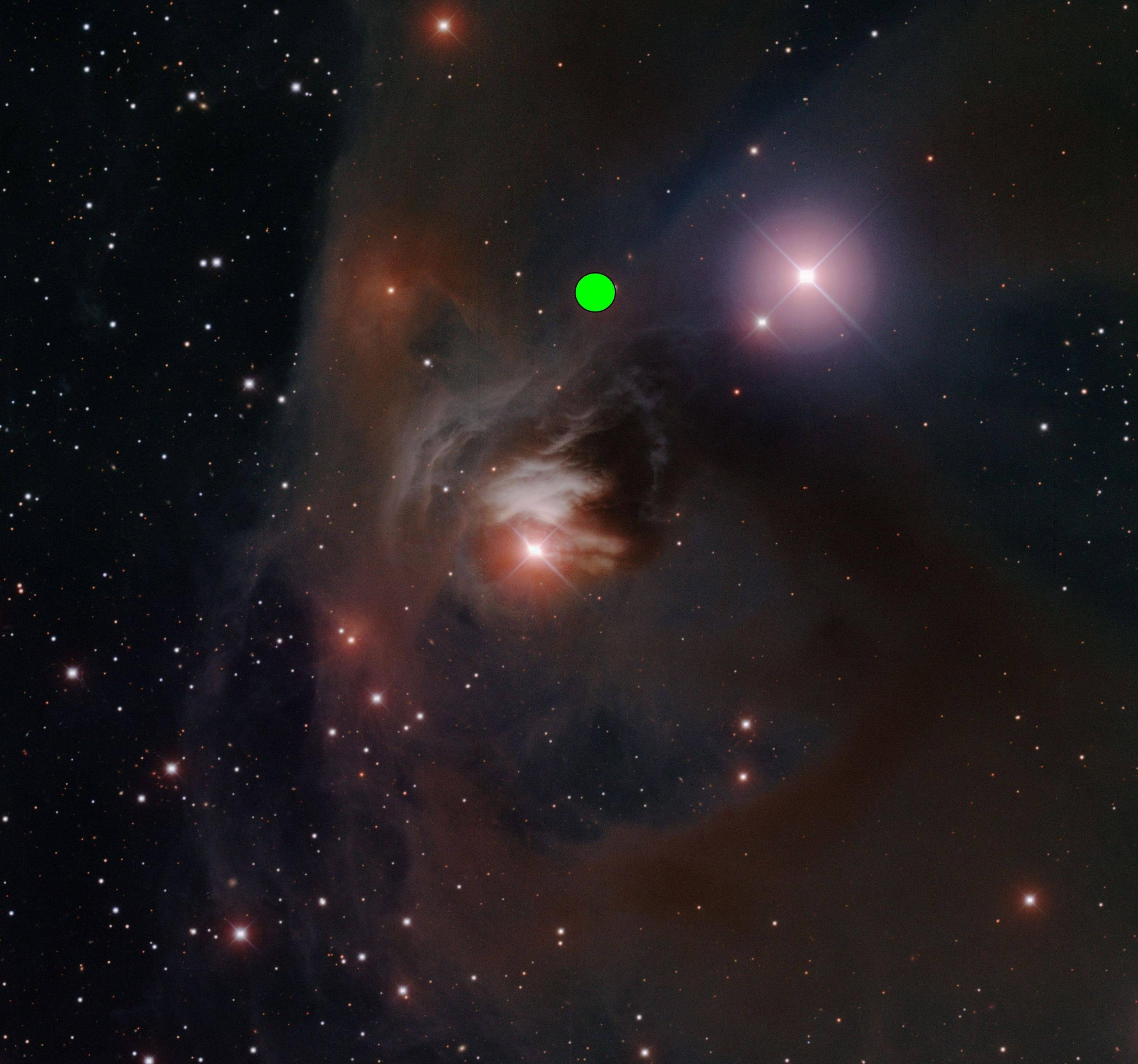
Reported location of NGC 1554 by Otto Wilhelm von Struve relative to NGC 1555

Dreyer describes it as

!!! var, S, R, Nn = *13

which in NGC's encoding is expanded to

a magnificent or otherwise interesting object, variable, small, round, nucleus north of a star of the 13th magnitude

The identification is uncertain; many sources think it is related to NGC 1555, Hind's Variable Nebula, but at NGC 1554's coordinates, (epoch J2000) 04^{h} 22^{m} 00.0^{s} +19° 36′ 00″ there is no nebula. However, there is a 14th magnitude star, 4' west-southwest of T Tauri, so there is a possibility that the nebula Struve discovered was surrounding a variable star and it only flares up every now and then (perhaps even on a centuries long cycle). Alternatively it may have been an error caused by a pair of faint stars.

== In fiction ==
In the 2014 video game Elite: Dangerous, Struve's Lost Nebula is featured as a small planetary nebula near the Pleiades cluster, and approximately 300 light years away from Earth. It has no star, so it physically can not be reached due to the mechanics of the game. This is likely due to an error in creating the astrometrics in the game, which is not uncommon for the game and has been a longstanding issue. There is also a Struve's Lost Sector within the game, but again, due to an error in the game's galactic map, the nebula itself is not within this sector.
