= Variable nebula =

Nebula with varying brightness

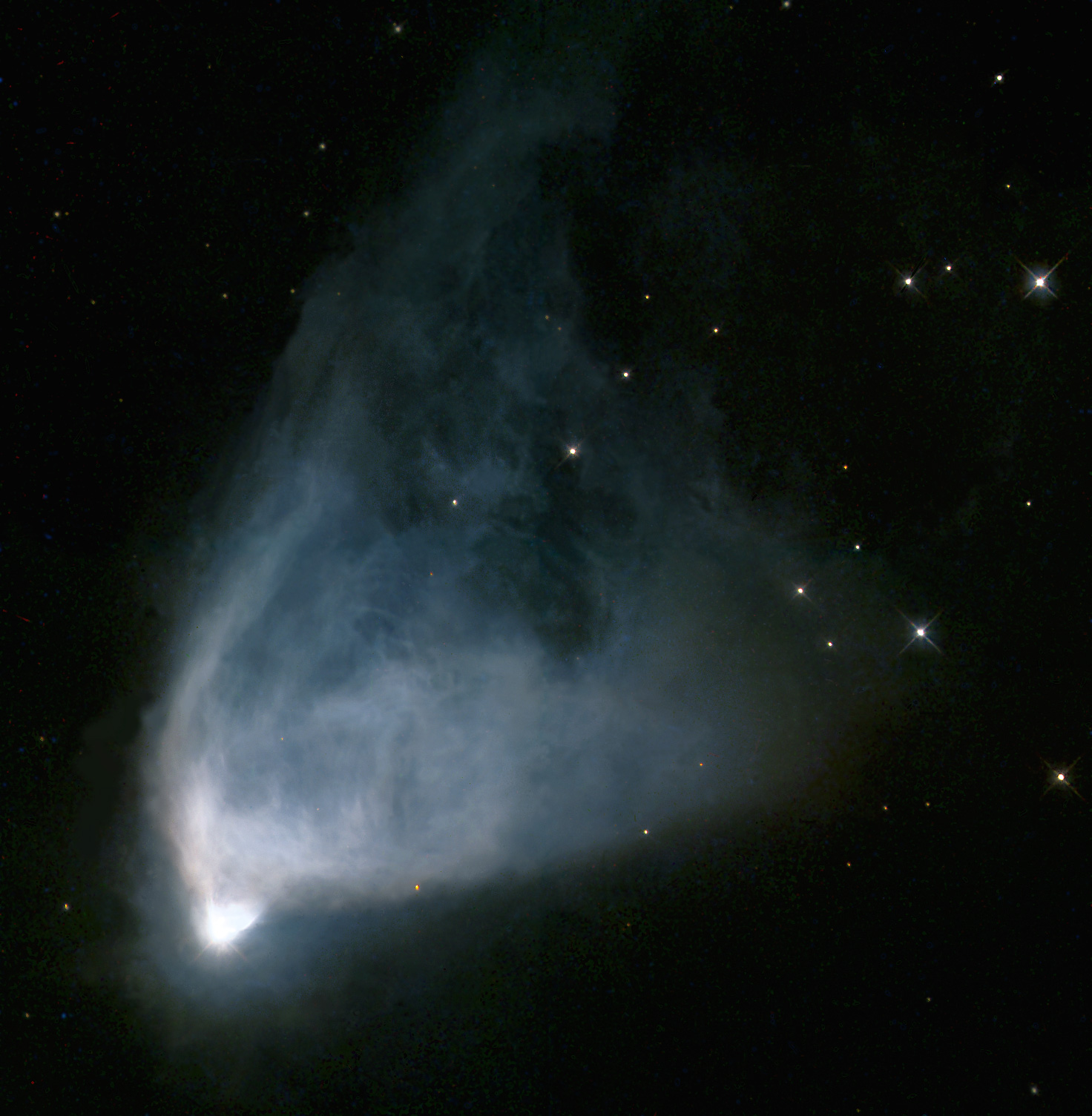
A Hubble Space Telescope image of NGC 2261, a classic example of a variable nebula.

Variable nebulae are reflection nebulae that change in brightness because of changes in their illuminating star.

== See also ==
- McNeil's Nebula
- NGC 1555 (Hind's Variable Nebula)
- NGC 2261 (Hubble's Variable Nebula)
- NGC 6729 (R Coronae Australis Nebula)
