= HP Tauri =

Variable star system in Taurus

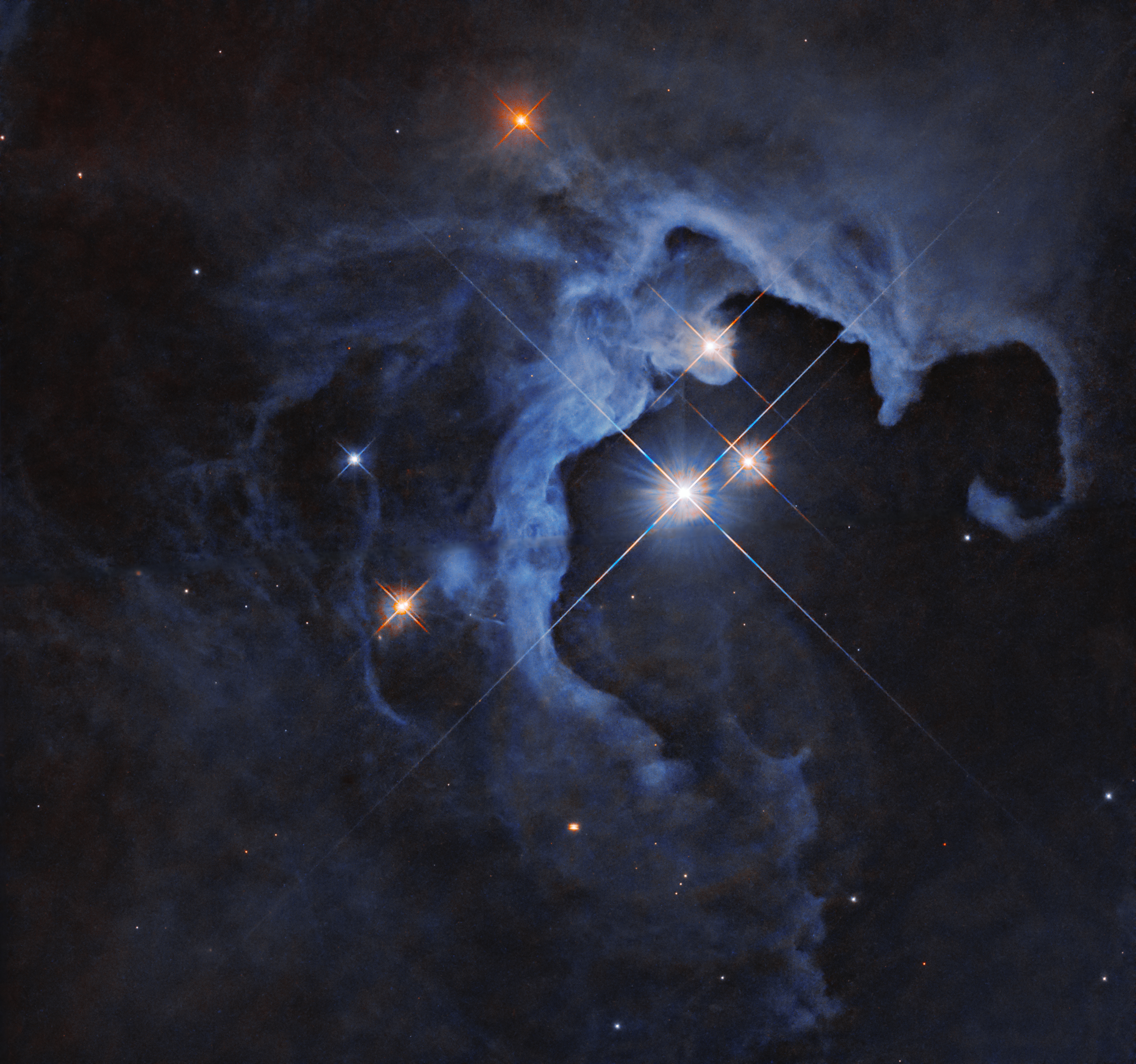
- HP Tauri and the surrounding GN 04.32.8 nebula imaged by Hubble Space Telescope

Observation data Epoch J2000.0 Equinox ICRS
- Constellation: Taurus
- Right ascension: 04^{h} 35^{m} 52.78^{s}
- Declination: +22° 54′ 23.2″
- Apparent magnitude (V): 14.90

Characteristics
- Evolutionary stage: Pre-main-sequence star
- Spectral type: K2-5e + G2e + M0.6
- Variable type: Orion variable

Astrometry
Proper motion (μ)	RA: +9.037 mas/yr Dec.: −13.853 mas/yr
Parallax (π)	5.8395±0.0490 mas
Distance	559 ± 5 ly (171 ± 1 pc)

Details
Mass	1.21 M_{☉}
Radius	1.60 R_{☉}
Luminosity	0.99 L_{☉}
Surface gravity (log g)	3.98 cgs
Temperature	4,522 K
Rotation	4.33 days
Rotational velocity (v sin i)	17.3 km/s
Age	1 Myr

Other designations
- HP Tau, EPIC 247592463, IRAS 04328+2248, 2MASS J04355277+2254231, Gaia DR3 145213187879627776

Database references
SIMBAD	data

HP Tauri is a star system in the constellation of Taurus. The component stars of the system are HP Tau, HP Tau G2, and HP Tau G3 (the latter two also entitled HP Tau/G2, and HP Tau/G3, respectively). HP Tauri is a T Tauri variable star. The star system is located in the Taurus molecular cloud and nebula GN 04.32.8. HP Tauri is around 550 light-years (170 parsecs) away from the Solar System. The system is around five-million-years-old.

== Observation history ==
In 1979, HP Tau was found to be surrounded by several stars, HP Tau G1 (which is not gravitationally bound to the rest of the system), HP Tau G2, and HP Tau G3. HP Tau G3 was found to be a binary system in of itself in 1994.

== Properties ==
HP Tau G2 is a G-type star with a surface temperature of 6,030 K (5,760 °C; 10,390 °F). HP Tau G2 has elevated iron levels compared to stars later in their evolutions. The star has non-thermal radio pulses.

HP Tau G3 is a M-type, tight binary star. HP Tauri may possess a non-thermal spectrum.
