= R Monocerotis =

Variable star in the constellation Monoceros

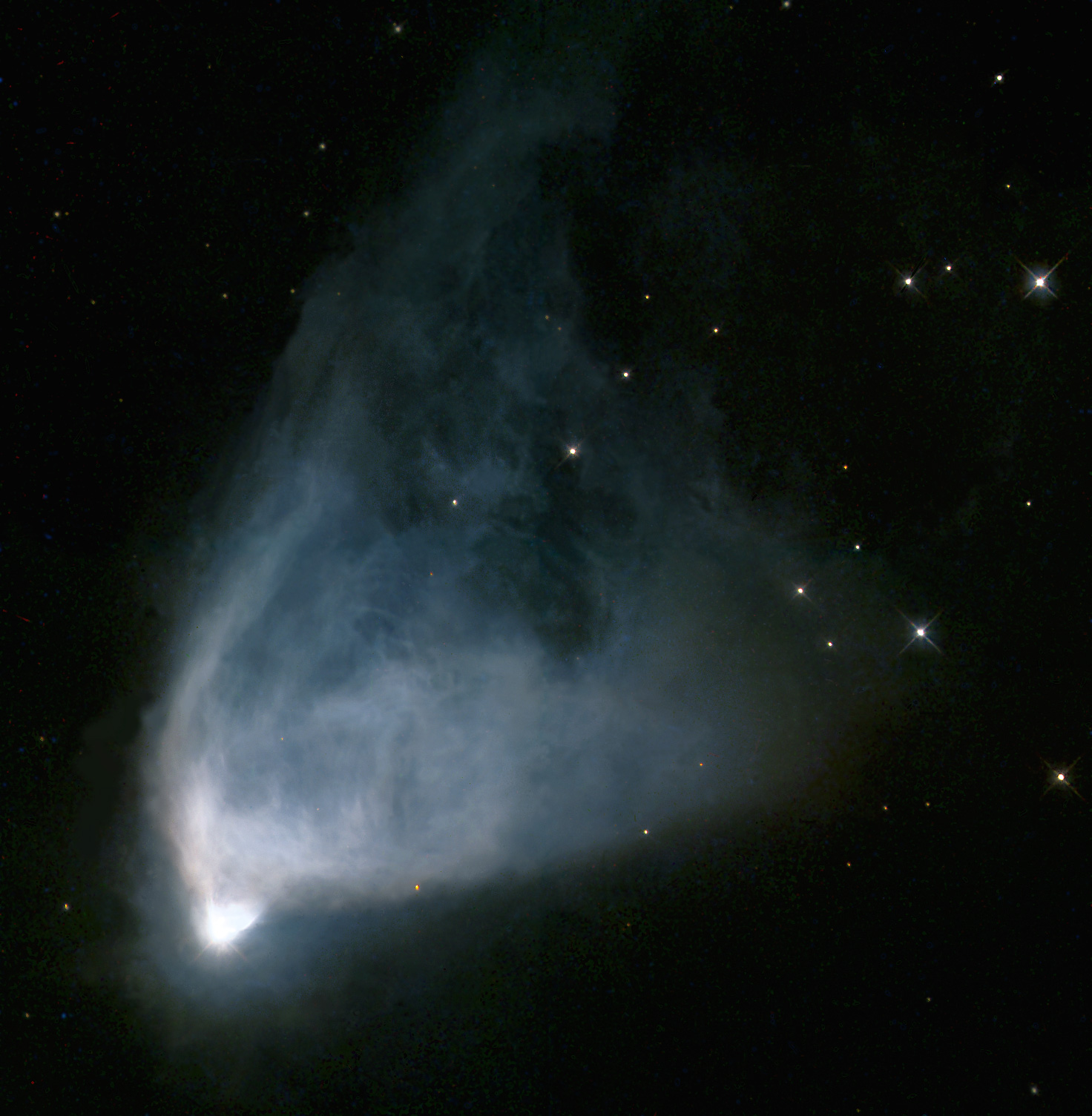
- R Monocerotis is at the bottom left of this photo. Credit: HST/NASA/JPL

Observation data Epoch J2000 Equinox J2000
- Constellation: Monoceros
- Right ascension: 06^{h} 39^{m} 09.954^{s}
- Declination: +08° 44′ 09.56″
- Apparent magnitude (V): 11.85

Characteristics
- Spectral type: B8IIIev
- Variable type: Herbig Ae/Be star

Astrometry
Distance	2600 ly (800 pc)

Details
Mass	~2–10 M_{☉}
Age	~10^{5} yr years

Other designations
- R Mon, BD+08°1427, 2MASS J06390995+0844097, NGC 2261

Database references
SIMBAD	data

R Monocerotis, abbreviated R Mon, is a very young binary star system in the equatorial constellation of Monoceros. The apparent magnitude of R Mon varies between 10 and 12 and the spectral type is B8IIIe.

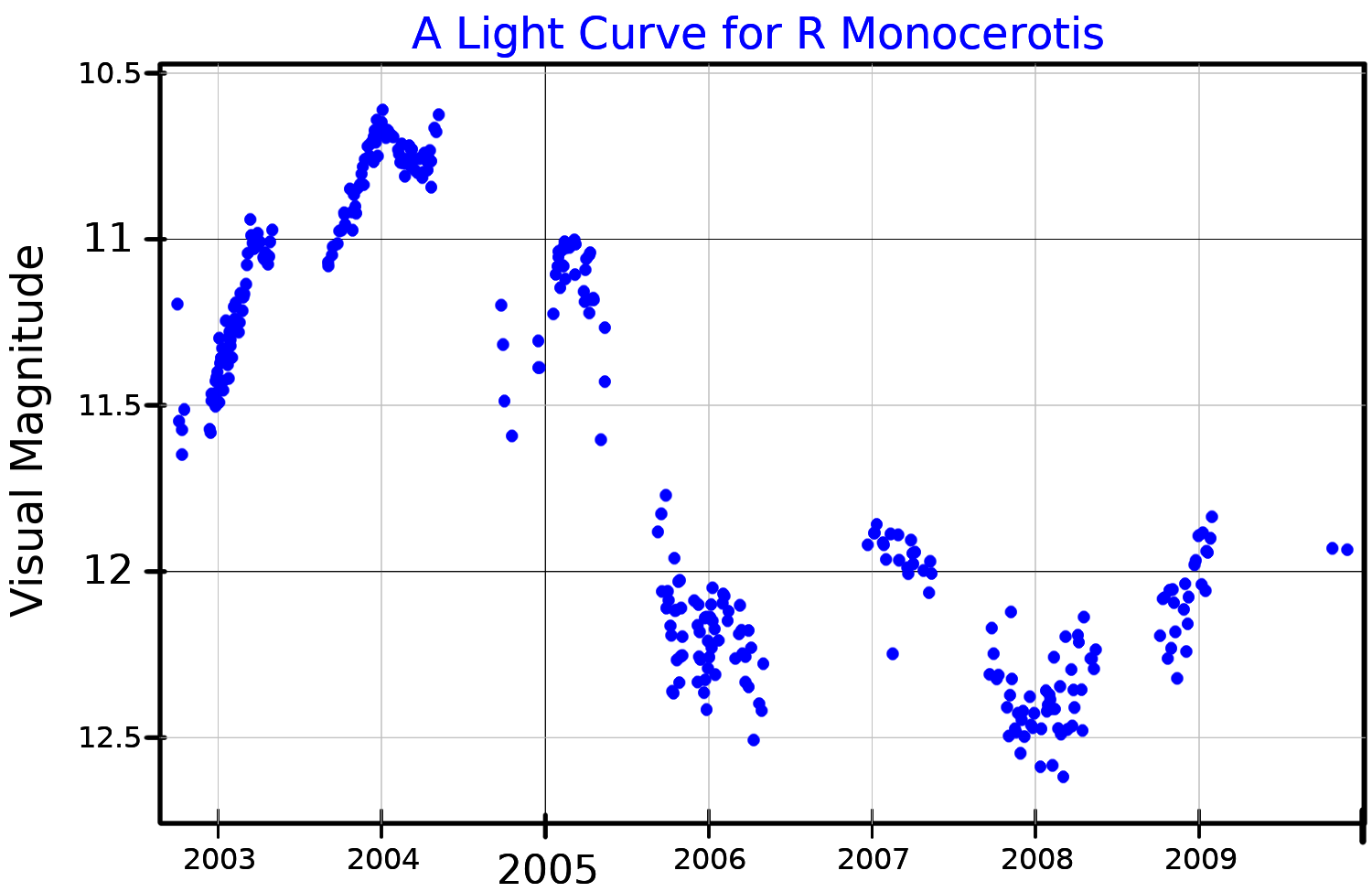
A visual band light curve for R Monocerotis, plotted from ASAS data

This is a massive Herbig Ae/Be star, a type of pre-main-sequence star that is surrounded by an orbiting circumstellar disk of gas and dust. This disk has a mass of ~0.007 M_{☉} and extends outward to a distance of under 150 AU from the host. Because of this dust, the star is obscured from direct visual sight but can still be observed in the infrared. R Mon is still in the accretion phase of star formation and it is driving an optically opaque bipolar outflow with a velocity of 9 km/s. The northern flow is blue-shifted, and thus moving more toward the Sun. There is a T Tauri-type stellar companion at an angular separation of 0.69″ from the primary.

This system is located in a diffuse nebula called "Hubble's Variable Nebula" (NGC 2261), which is being illuminated by a conical beam of light from the primary.
