= NGC 1555 =

Variable nebula in the constellation Taurus

Reflection nebula
- Variable nebula
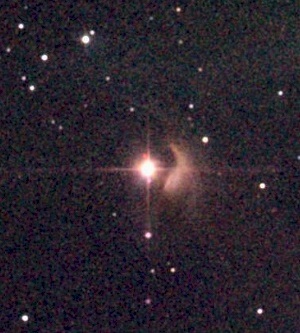
- A near-infrared image of NGC 1555

Observation data: J2000.0 epoch
- Right ascension: 4^{h} 21^{m} 57.1^{s}
- Declination: +19° 32′ 7″
- Constellation: Taurus
- Designations: Hind's Nebula, Sharpless 238, PGC 1595946

NGC 1555, sometimes known as Hind's Variable Nebula, Sh2-238 or HH 155, is a variable nebula 4 light years across, illuminated by the star T Tauri, located in the constellation Taurus. It is 400 light years away from Earth, and has a magnitude (B) of 9.98. It is also in the second Sharpless catalog as 238. It is a Herbig–Haro object. The nebula was discovered on October 11, 1852, by John Russell Hind.

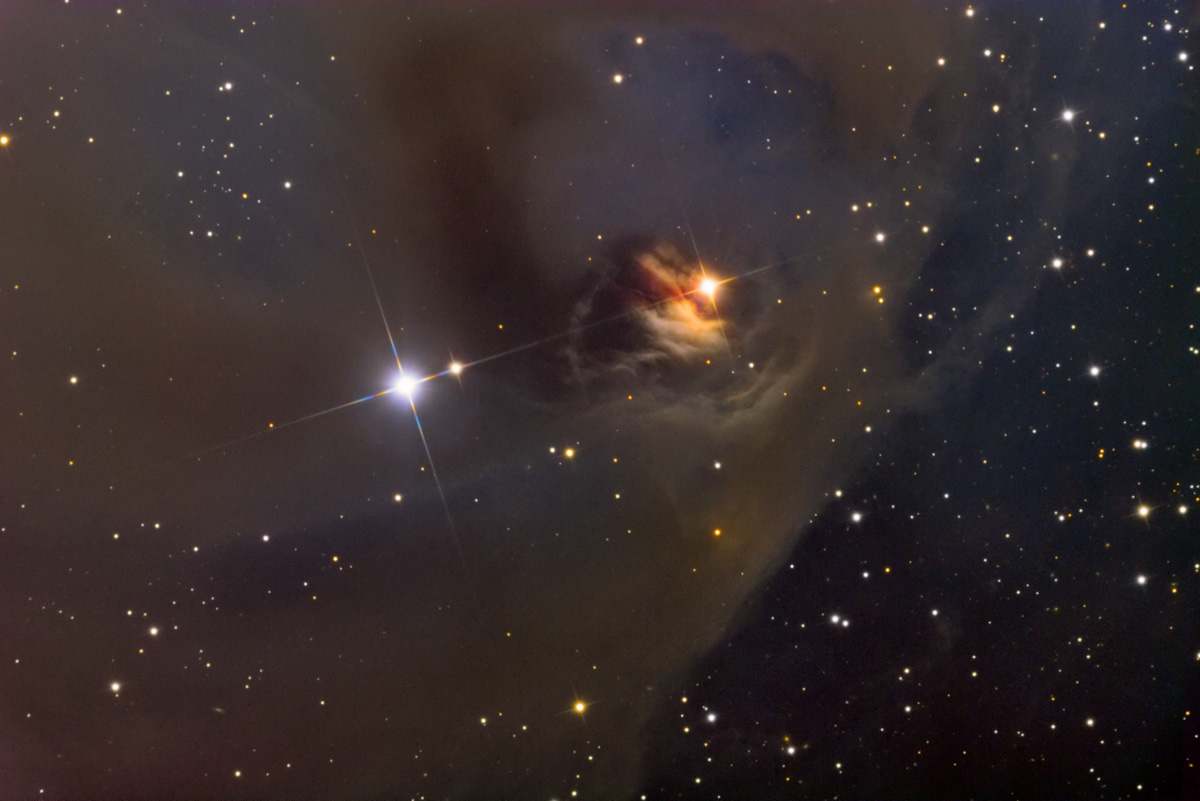
NGC 1555 from the 0.8m Schulman at the Mount Lemmon Sky Center, AZ.

Timelapse of variable nebula activity of NGC 1555 from October 2022 to March 2023 compiled from contributions from the big amateur telescope (https://bigamateurtelescope.com/)

== See also ==
- NGC 2261
