= Taurus in Chinese astronomy =

According to traditional Chinese uranography, the modern constellation Taurus is located within the western quadrant of the sky, which is symbolized as the White Tiger of the West (西方白虎) (Xī Fāng Bái Hǔ).

The name of the western constellation in modern Chinese is 金牛座 (jīn niú zuò), meaning "the golden bull constellation".

== Stars ==
The map of Chinese constellation in constellation Taurus area consists of:

Four Symbols	Mansion (Chinese name)	Romanization	Translation	Asterisms (Chinese name)	Romanization	Translation	Western star name	Proper Name	Chinese star name	Romanization	Translation
White Tiger of the West (西方白虎)	胃	Wèi	Stomach	天廩	Tiānlǐn	Celestial Foodstuff					
White Tiger of the West (西方白虎)	胃	Wèi	Stomach	天廩	Tiānlǐn	Celestial Foodstuff	5 Tau		天廩一	Tiānlǐnyī	1st star
White Tiger of the West (西方白虎)	胃	Wèi	Stomach	天廩	Tiānlǐn	Celestial Foodstuff	4 Tau		天廩二	Tiānlǐnèr	2nd star
White Tiger of the West (西方白虎)	胃	Wèi	Stomach	天廩	Tiānlǐn	Celestial Foodstuff	ξ Tau		天廩三	Tiānlǐnsān	3rd star
White Tiger of the West (西方白虎)	胃	Wèi	Stomach	天廩	Tiānlǐn	Celestial Foodstuff	ο Tau		天廩四	Tiānlǐnsì	4th star
White Tiger of the West (西方白虎)	胃	Wèi	Stomach	天廩	Tiānlǐn	Celestial Foodstuff	6 Tau		天廩增一	Tiānlǐnzēngyī	1st additional star
White Tiger of the West (西方白虎)	胃	Wèi	Stomach	天廩	Tiānlǐn	Celestial Foodstuff	29 Tau		天廩增二	Tiānlǐnzēngèr	2nd additional star
White Tiger of the West (西方白虎)	胃	Wèi	Stomach	天囷	Tiānjūn	Circular Celestial Granary					
White Tiger of the West (西方白虎)	胃	Wèi	Stomach	天囷	Tiānjūn	Circular Celestial Granary	12 Tau		天囷增十二	Tiānqūnzēngshíèr	12th additional star
White Tiger of the West (西方白虎)	胃	Wèi	Stomach	天囷	Tiānjūn	Circular Celestial Granary	10 Tau		天囷增十五	Tiānqūnzēngshíwǔ	15th additional star
White Tiger of the West (西方白虎)	胃	Wèi	Stomach	天囷	Tiānjūn	Circular Celestial Granary	V711 Tau		天囷增二十一	Tiānqūnzēngèrshíyī	21st additional star
White Tiger of the West (西方白虎)	昴	Mǎo	Hairy Head	昴	Mǎo	Hairy Head					
White Tiger of the West (西方白虎)	昴	Mǎo	Hairy Head	昴	Mǎo	Hairy Head	17 Tau	Electra	昴宿一	Mǎosùyī	1st star
White Tiger of the West (西方白虎)	昴	Mǎo	Hairy Head	昴	Mǎo	Hairy Head	19 Tau	Taygeta (for component Aa)	昴宿二	Mǎosùèr	2nd star
White Tiger of the West (西方白虎)	昴	Mǎo	Hairy Head	昴	Mǎo	Hairy Head	21 Tau	Asterope	昴宿三	Mǎosùsān	3rd star
White Tiger of the West (西方白虎)	昴	Mǎo	Hairy Head	昴	Mǎo	Hairy Head	20 Tau	Maia	昴宿四	Mǎosùsì	4th star
White Tiger of the West (西方白虎)	昴	Mǎo	Hairy Head	昴	Mǎo	Hairy Head	23 Tau	Merope	昴宿五	Mǎosùwǔ	5th star
White Tiger of the West (西方白虎)	昴	Mǎo	Hairy Head	昴	Mǎo	Hairy Head	η Tau	Alcyone			
White Tiger of the West (西方白虎)	昴	Mǎo	Hairy Head	昴	Mǎo	Hairy Head	η Tau	Alcyone	昴宿六	Mǎosùliù	6th star
White Tiger of the West (西方白虎)	昴	Mǎo	Hairy Head	昴	Mǎo	Hairy Head	η Tau	Alcyone	昴宿西第五星	Mǎosùxīdìwǔxīng	5th big star in the west
White Tiger of the West (西方白虎)	昴	Mǎo	Hairy Head	昴	Mǎo	Hairy Head	27 Tau	Atlas	昴宿七	Mǎosùqī	7th star
White Tiger of the West (西方白虎)	昴	Mǎo	Hairy Head	昴	Mǎo	Hairy Head	11 Tau		昴宿增一	Mǎosùzēngyī	1st additional star
White Tiger of the West (西方白虎)	昴	Mǎo	Hairy Head	昴	Mǎo	Hairy Head	7 Tau		昴宿增二	Mǎosùzēngèr	2nd additional star
White Tiger of the West (西方白虎)	昴	Mǎo	Hairy Head	昴	Mǎo	Hairy Head	9 Tau		昴宿增三	Mǎosùzēngsān	3rd additional star
White Tiger of the West (西方白虎)	昴	Mǎo	Hairy Head	昴	Mǎo	Hairy Head	32 Tau		昴宿增五	Mǎosùzēngwǔ	5th additional star
White Tiger of the West (西方白虎)	昴	Mǎo	Hairy Head	昴	Mǎo	Hairy Head	18 Tau		昴宿增八	Mǎosùzēngbā	8th additional star
White Tiger of the West (西方白虎)	昴	Mǎo	Hairy Head	昴	Mǎo	Hairy Head	16 Tau	Celaeno	昴宿增九	Mǎosùzēngjiǔ	9th additional star
White Tiger of the West (西方白虎)	昴	Mǎo	Hairy Head	昴	Mǎo	Hairy Head	24 Tau		昴宿增十	Mǎosùzēngshí	10th additional star
White Tiger of the West (西方白虎)	昴	Mǎo	Hairy Head	昴	Mǎo	Hairy Head	26 Tau		昴宿增十一	Mǎosùzēngshíyī	11th additional star
White Tiger of the West (西方白虎)	昴	Mǎo	Hairy Head	昴	Mǎo	Hairy Head	28 Tau	Pleione	昴宿增十二	Mǎosùzēngshíèr	12th additional star
White Tiger of the West (西方白虎)	昴	Mǎo	Hairy Head	昴	Mǎo	Hairy Head	HD 23923		昴宿增十三	Mǎosùzēngshísān	13th additional star
White Tiger of the West (西方白虎)	昴	Mǎo	Hairy Head	月	Yuè	Moon					
White Tiger of the West (西方白虎)	昴	Mǎo	Hairy Head	月	Yuè	Moon	37 Tau		月	Yuè	(One star of)
White Tiger of the West (西方白虎)	昴	Mǎo	Hairy Head	月	Yuè	Moon	39 Tau		月增一	Yuèzēngyī	1st additional star
White Tiger of the West (西方白虎)	昴	Mǎo	Hairy Head	天陰	Tiānyīn	Yin Force					
White Tiger of the West (西方白虎)	昴	Mǎo	Hairy Head	天陰	Tiānyīn	Yin Force	13 Tau		天陰增三	Tiānyīnzēngsān	3rd additional star
White Tiger of the West (西方白虎)	昴	Mǎo	Hairy Head	天陰	Tiānyīn	Yin Force	14 Tau		天陰增四	Tiānyīnzēngsì	4th additional star
White Tiger of the West (西方白虎)	昴	Mǎo	Hairy Head	礪石	Lìshí	Whetstone					
White Tiger of the West (西方白虎)	昴	Mǎo	Hairy Head	礪石	Lìshí	Whetstone	ψ Tau		礪石一	Lìshíyī	1st star
White Tiger of the West (西方白虎)	昴	Mǎo	Hairy Head	礪石	Lìshí	Whetstone	44 Tau		礪石二	Lìshíèr	2nd star
White Tiger of the West (西方白虎)	昴	Mǎo	Hairy Head	礪石	Lìshí	Whetstone	χ Tau		礪石三	Lìshísān	3rd star
White Tiger of the West (西方白虎)	昴	Mǎo	Hairy Head	礪石	Lìshí	Whetstone	φ Tau		礪石四	Lìshísì	4th star
White Tiger of the West (西方白虎)	畢	Bì	Net	畢	Bì	Net					
White Tiger of the West (西方白虎)	畢	Bì	Net	畢	Bì	Net	ε Tau	Ain			
White Tiger of the West (西方白虎)	畢	Bì	Net	畢	Bì	Net	ε Tau	Ain	畢宿一	Bìsùyī	1st star
White Tiger of the West (西方白虎)	畢	Bì	Net	畢	Bì	Net	ε Tau	Ain	畢宿距星	Bìsùjùxīng	Separated star
White Tiger of the West (西方白虎)	畢	Bì	Net	畢	Bì	Net	ε Tau	Ain	畢宿右股第一星	Bìsùyòugǔdìyīxīng	1st star in the right
White Tiger of the West (西方白虎)	畢	Bì	Net	畢	Bì	Net	δ^{3} Tau		畢宿二	Bìsùèr	2nd star
White Tiger of the West (西方白虎)	畢	Bì	Net	畢	Bì	Net	δ^{1} Tau	Secunda Hyadum (for component Aa)			
White Tiger of the West (西方白虎)	畢	Bì	Net	畢	Bì	Net	δ^{1} Tau	Secunda Hyadum (for component Aa)	畢宿三	Bìsùsān	3rd star
White Tiger of the West (西方白虎)	畢	Bì	Net	畢	Bì	Net	δ^{1} Tau	Secunda Hyadum (for component Aa)	畢宿右股第三星	Bìsùjùxīng	Separated star
White Tiger of the West (西方白虎)	畢	Bì	Net	畢	Bì	Net	δ^{1} Tau	Secunda Hyadum (for component Aa)	畢宿右股第一星	Bìsùyòugǔdìsānxīng	3rd star in the right
White Tiger of the West (西方白虎)	畢	Bì	Net	畢	Bì	Net	γ Tau	Prima Hyadum (for component A)			
White Tiger of the West (西方白虎)	畢	Bì	Net	畢	Bì	Net	γ Tau	Prima Hyadum (for component A)	畢宿四	Bìsùsì	4th star
White Tiger of the West (西方白虎)	畢	Bì	Net	畢	Bì	Net	γ Tau	Prima Hyadum (for component A)	畢宿中央星	Bìsùzhōngyāngxīng	Center star
White Tiger of the West (西方白虎)	畢	Bì	Net	畢	Bì	Net	α Tau	Aldebaran			
White Tiger of the West (西方白虎)	畢	Bì	Net	畢	Bì	Net	α Tau	Aldebaran	畢宿五	Bìsùwǔ	5th star
White Tiger of the West (西方白虎)	畢	Bì	Net	畢	Bì	Net	α Tau	Aldebaran	边将	Bianjiàng	General in the edge
White Tiger of the West (西方白虎)	畢	Bì	Net	畢	Bì	Net	α Tau	Aldebaran	畢宿左股第一星	Bìsùzuǒgǔdìyīxīng	1st star in the left
White Tiger of the West (西方白虎)	畢	Bì	Net	畢	Bì	Net	α Tau	Aldebaran	畢宿大星	Bìsùdàxīng	Great star
White Tiger of the West (西方白虎)	畢	Bì	Net	畢	Bì	Net	θ^{2} Tau	Chakumuy (for component Aa)			
White Tiger of the West (西方白虎)	畢	Bì	Net	畢	Bì	Net	θ^{2} Tau	Chakumuy (for component Aa)	畢宿六	Bìsùliù	6th star
White Tiger of the West (西方白虎)	畢	Bì	Net	畢	Bì	Net	θ^{2} Tau	Chakumuy (for component Aa)	畢宿左股第二星	Bìsùzuǒgǔdìèrxīng	2nd star in the left
White Tiger of the West (西方白虎)	畢	Bì	Net	畢	Bì	Net	71 Tau		畢宿七	Bìsùqī	7th star
White Tiger of the West (西方白虎)	畢	Bì	Net	畢	Bì	Net	λ Tau	Bibing	畢宿八	Bìsùbā	8th star
White Tiger of the West (西方白虎)	畢	Bì	Net	畢	Bì	Net	30 Tau		畢宿增一	Bìsùzēngyī	1st additional star
White Tiger of the West (西方白虎)	畢	Bì	Net	畢	Bì	Net	31 Tau		畢宿增二	Bìsùzēngèr	2nd additional star
White Tiger of the West (西方白虎)	畢	Bì	Net	畢	Bì	Net	ν Tau		畢宿增三	Bìsùzēngsān	3rd additional star
White Tiger of the West (西方白虎)	畢	Bì	Net	畢	Bì	Net	40 Tau		畢宿增四	Bìsùzēngsì	4th additional star
White Tiger of the West (西方白虎)	畢	Bì	Net	畢	Bì	Net	45 Tau		畢宿增五	Bìsùzēngwǔ	5th additional star
White Tiger of the West (西方白虎)	畢	Bì	Net	畢	Bì	Net	46 Tau		畢宿增六	Bìsùzēngliù	6th additional star
White Tiger of the West (西方白虎)	畢	Bì	Net	畢	Bì	Net	μ Tau		畢宿增七	Bìsùzēngqī	7th additional star
White Tiger of the West (西方白虎)	畢	Bì	Net	畢	Bì	Net	47 Tau		畢宿增八	Bìsùzēngbā	8th additional star
White Tiger of the West (西方白虎)	畢	Bì	Net	畢	Bì	Net	48 Tau		畢宿增九	Bìsùzēngjiǔ	9th additional star
White Tiger of the West (西方白虎)	畢	Bì	Net	畢	Bì	Net	58 Tau		畢宿增十	Bìsùzēngshí	10th additional star
White Tiger of the West (西方白虎)	畢	Bì	Net	畢	Bì	Net	63 Tau		畢宿增十一	Bìsùzēngshíyī	11th additional star
White Tiger of the West (西方白虎)	畢	Bì	Net	畢	Bì	Net	64 Tau		畢宿增十二	Bìsùzēngshíèr	12th additional star
White Tiger of the West (西方白虎)	畢	Bì	Net	畢	Bì	Net	θ^{1} Tau		毕宿增十三	Bìsùzēngshísān	13th additional star
White Tiger of the West (西方白虎)	畢	Bì	Net	畢	Bì	Net	HD 28527		毕宿增十五	Bìsùzēngshíwǔ	15th additional star
White Tiger of the West (西方白虎)	畢	Bì	Net	畢	Bì	Net	HD 28568		毕宿增十六	Bìsùzēngshíliù	16th additional star
White Tiger of the West (西方白虎)	畢	Bì	Net	畢	Bì	Net	85 Tau		毕宿增十七	Bìsùzēngshíqī	17th additional star
White Tiger of the West (西方白虎)	畢	Bì	Net	附耳	Fùěr	Whisper					
White Tiger of the West (西方白虎)	畢	Bì	Net	附耳	Fùěr	Whisper	σ^{2} Tau		附耳	Fùěr	(One star of)
White Tiger of the West (西方白虎)	畢	Bì	Net	附耳	Fùěr	Whisper	σ^{1} Tau		附耳增一	Fùěrzēngyī	1st additional star
White Tiger of the West (西方白虎)	畢	Bì	Net	附耳	Fùěr	Whisper	89 Tau		附耳增二	Fùěrzēngèr	2nd additional star
White Tiger of the West (西方白虎)	畢	Bì	Net	天街	Tiānjiē	Celestial Street					
White Tiger of the West (西方白虎)	畢	Bì	Net	天街	Tiānjiē	Celestial Street	κ^{1} Tau		天街一	Tiānjiēyī	1st star
White Tiger of the West (西方白虎)	畢	Bì	Net	天街	Tiānjiē	Celestial Street	ω Tau		天街二	Tiānjiēèr	2nd star
White Tiger of the West (西方白虎)	畢	Bì	Net	天街	Tiānjiē	Celestial Street	43 Tau		天街增一	Tiānjiēzēngyī	1st additional star
White Tiger of the West (西方白虎)	畢	Bì	Net	天街	Tiānjiē	Celestial Street	κ^{2} Tau		天街增二	Tiānjiēzēngèr	2nd additional star
White Tiger of the West (西方白虎)	畢	Bì	Net	天街	Tiānjiē	Celestial Street	υ Tau		天街增三	Tiānjiēzēngsān	3rd additional star
White Tiger of the West (西方白虎)	畢	Bì	Net	天街	Tiānjiē	Celestial Street	72 Tau		天街增四	Tiānjiēzēngsì	4th additional star
White Tiger of the West (西方白虎)	畢	Bì	Net	天節	Tiānjié	Celestial Tally					
White Tiger of the West (西方白虎)	畢	Bì	Net	天節	Tiānjié	Celestial Tally	π Tau		天節一	Tiānjiéyī	1st star
White Tiger of the West (西方白虎)	畢	Bì	Net	天節	Tiānjié	Celestial Tally	ρ Tau		天節二	Tiānjiéèr	2nd star
White Tiger of the West (西方白虎)	畢	Bì	Net	天節	Tiānjié	Celestial Tally	57 Tau		天節三	Tiānjiésān	3rd star
White Tiger of the West (西方白虎)	畢	Bì	Net	天節	Tiānjié	Celestial Tally	79 Tau		天節四	Tiānjiésì	4th star
White Tiger of the West (西方白虎)	畢	Bì	Net	天節	Tiānjié	Celestial Tally	90 Tau		天節五	Tiānjiéwǔ	5th star
White Tiger of the West (西方白虎)	畢	Bì	Net	天節	Tiānjié	Celestial Tally	93 Tau		天節六	Tiānjiéliù	6th star
White Tiger of the West (西方白虎)	畢	Bì	Net	天節	Tiānjié	Celestial Tally	88 Tau		天節七	Tiānjiéqī	7th star
White Tiger of the West (西方白虎)	畢	Bì	Net	天節	Tiānjié	Celestial Tally	66 Tau		天節八	Tiānjiébā	8th star
White Tiger of the West (西方白虎)	畢	Bì	Net	諸王	Zhūwáng	Feudal Kings					
White Tiger of the West (西方白虎)	畢	Bì	Net	諸王	Zhūwáng	Feudal Kings	136 Tau		諸王一	Zhūwángyī	1st star
White Tiger of the West (西方白虎)	畢	Bì	Net	諸王	Zhūwáng	Feudal Kings	125 Tau		諸王二	Zhūwángèr	2nd star
White Tiger of the West (西方白虎)	畢	Bì	Net	諸王	Zhūwáng	Feudal Kings	118 Tau		諸王三	Zhūwángsān	3rd star
White Tiger of the West (西方白虎)	畢	Bì	Net	諸王	Zhūwáng	Feudal Kings	103 Tau		諸王四	Zhūwángsì	4th star
White Tiger of the West (西方白虎)	畢	Bì	Net	諸王	Zhūwáng	Feudal Kings	99 Tau		諸王五	Zhūwángwǔ	5th star
White Tiger of the West (西方白虎)	畢	Bì	Net	諸王	Zhūwáng	Feudal Kings	τ Tau	Gaja			
White Tiger of the West (西方白虎)	畢	Bì	Net	諸王	Zhūwáng	Feudal Kings	τ Tau	Gaja	諸王六	Zhūwángliù	6th star
White Tiger of the West (西方白虎)	畢	Bì	Net	諸王	Zhūwáng	Feudal Kings	τ Tau	Gaja	華蓋中央大星	Huágàizhōngyāngdàxīng	Big star in the center of Canopy of the Emperor
White Tiger of the West (西方白虎)	畢	Bì	Net	諸王	Zhūwáng	Feudal Kings	95 Tau		諸王增一	Zhūwángzēngyī	1st additional star
White Tiger of the West (西方白虎)	畢	Bì	Net	諸王	Zhūwáng	Feudal Kings	98 Tau		諸王增二	Zhūwángzēngèr	2nd additional star
White Tiger of the West (西方白虎)	畢	Bì	Net	諸王	Zhūwáng	Feudal Kings	121 Tau		諸王增三	Zhūwángzēngsān	3rd additional star
White Tiger of the West (西方白虎)	畢	Bì	Net	諸王	Zhūwáng	Feudal Kings	132 Tau		諸王增四	Zhūwángzēngsì	4th additional star
White Tiger of the West (西方白虎)	畢	Bì	Net	天高	Tiāngāo	Celestial High Terrace					
White Tiger of the West (西方白虎)	畢	Bì	Net	天高	Tiāngāo	Celestial High Terrace	ι Tau		天高一	Tiāngāoyī	1st star
White Tiger of the West (西方白虎)	畢	Bì	Net	天高	Tiāngāo	Celestial High Terrace	97 Tau	Lembu	天高二	Tiāngāoèr	2nd star
White Tiger of the West (西方白虎)	畢	Bì	Net	天高	Tiāngāo	Celestial High Terrace	107 Tau		天高三	Tiāngāosān	3rd star
White Tiger of the West (西方白虎)	畢	Bì	Net	天高	Tiāngāo	Celestial High Terrace	109 Tau		天高四	Tiāngāosì	4th star
White Tiger of the West (西方白虎)	畢	Bì	Net	天高	Tiāngāo	Celestial High Terrace	104 Tau		天高增一	Tiāngāozēngyī	1st additional star
White Tiger of the West (西方白虎)	畢	Bì	Net	天高	Tiāngāo	Celestial High Terrace	106 Tau		天高增二	Tiāngāozēngèr	2nd additional star
White Tiger of the West (西方白虎)	畢	Bì	Net	天高	Tiāngāo	Celestial High Terrace	105 Tau		天高增三	Tiāngāozēngsān	3rd additional star
White Tiger of the West (西方白虎)	畢	Bì	Net	天高	Tiāngāo	Celestial High Terrace	114 Tau		天高增四	Tiāngāozēngsì	4th additional star
White Tiger of the West (西方白虎)	畢	Bì	Net	五車	Wǔchē	Five Chariots					
White Tiger of the West (西方白虎)	畢	Bì	Net	五車	Wǔchē	Five Chariots	β Tau	Elnath			
White Tiger of the West (西方白虎)	畢	Bì	Net	五車	Wǔchē	Five Chariots	β Tau	Elnath	五車五	Wǔchēwǔ	5th star
White Tiger of the West (西方白虎)	畢	Bì	Net	五車	Wǔchē	Five Chariots	β Tau	Elnath	五帝车五	Wǔdìchēwǔ	Fifth king chariot
White Tiger of the West (西方白虎)	畢	Bì	Net	五車	Wǔchē	Five Chariots	β Tau	Elnath	五車东南星	Wǔjūchēdōngnánxīng	Fifth separated star in southeast
White Tiger of the West (西方白虎)	畢	Bì	Net	天關	Tiānguān	Celestial Gate					
White Tiger of the West (西方白虎)	畢	Bì	Net	天關	Tiānguān	Celestial Gate	ζ Tau	Tianguan	天關	Tiānguān	(One star of)
White Tiger of the West (西方白虎)	畢	Bì	Net	天關	Tiānguān	Celestial Gate	113 Tau		天關增一	Tiānguānzēngyī	1st additional star
White Tiger of the West (西方白虎)	畢	Bì	Net	天關	Tiānguān	Celestial Gate	126 Tau		天關增二	Tiānguānzēngèr	2nd additional star
White Tiger of the West (西方白虎)	畢	Bì	Net	天關	Tiānguān	Celestial Gate	128 Tau		天關增三	Tiānguānzēngsān	3rd additional star
White Tiger of the West (西方白虎)	畢	Bì	Net	天關	Tiānguān	Celestial Gate	129 Tau		天關增四	Tiānguānzēngsì	4th additional star
White Tiger of the West (西方白虎)	畢	Bì	Net	天關	Tiānguān	Celestial Gate	130 Tau		天關增五	Tiānguānzēngwǔ	5th additional star
White Tiger of the West (西方白虎)	畢	Bì	Net	天關	Tiānguān	Celestial Gate	127 Tau		天關增六	Tiānguānzēngliù	6th additional star
White Tiger of the West (西方白虎)	畢	Bì	Net	參旗	Sānqí	Banner of Three Stars					
White Tiger of the West (西方白虎)	畢	Bì	Net	參旗	Sānqí	Banner of Three Stars	96 Tau		參旗增一	Sānqízēngyī	1st additional star
White Tiger of the West (西方白虎)	畢	Bì	Net	參旗	Sānqí	Banner of Three Stars	HD 31539		參旗增二	Sānqízēngèr	2nd additional star
White Tiger of the West (西方白虎)	畢	Bì	Net	參旗	Sānqí	Banner of Three Stars	101 Tau		參旗增三	Sānqízēngsān	3rd additional star
White Tiger of the West (西方白虎)	畢	Bì	Net	九斿	Jiǔliú	Imperial Military Flag					
White Tiger of the West (西方白虎)	畢	Bì	Net	九斿	Jiǔliú	Imperial Military Flag	49 Eri		九斿一	Jiǔliúyī	1st star
White Tiger of the West (西方白虎)	畢	Bì	Net	九斿	Jiǔliú	Imperial Military Flag	HD 28375		九斿增一	Jiǔliúzēngyī	1st additional star
White Tiger of the West (西方白虎)	觜	Zī	Turtle Beak	司怪	Sīguài	Deity in Charge of Monsters	139 Tau		司怪一	Sīguàiyī	1st star
Vermilion Bird of the South (南方朱雀)	井	Jǐng	Well	水府	Shuǐfǔ	Irrigation Official					
Vermilion Bird of the South (南方朱雀)	井	Jǐng	Well	水府	Shuǐfǔ	Irrigation Official	133 Tau		水府增一	Shuǐfǔzēngyī	1st additional star
Vermilion Bird of the South (南方朱雀)	井	Jǐng	Well	水府	Shuǐfǔ	Irrigation Official	131 Tau		水府增二	Shuǐfǔzēngèr	2nd additional star
Vermilion Bird of the South (南方朱雀)	井	Jǐng	Well	水府	Shuǐfǔ	Irrigation Official	135 Tau		水府增三	Shuǐfǔzēngsān	3rd additional star
Vermilion Bird of the South (南方朱雀)	井	Jǐng	Well	水府	Shuǐfǔ	Irrigation Official	137 Tau		水府增四	Shuǐfǔzēngsì	4th additional star

== See also ==
- Traditional Chinese star names
- Chinese constellations
