= Phi Tauri =

Star in the constellation Taurus

- Location of φ Tauri (circled)

Observation data Epoch J2000.0 Equinox J2000.0 (ICRS)
- Constellation: Taurus
- Right ascension: 04^{h} 20^{m} 21.21580^{s}
- Declination: +27° 21′ 02.7009″
- Apparent magnitude (V): +4.957

Characteristics
- Spectral type: K1 III
- B−V color index: 1.154

Astrometry
Radial velocity (R_{v})	1.27 km/s
Proper motion (μ)	RA: −28.90 mas/yr Dec.: −78.28 mas/yr
Parallax (π)	10.16±0.26 mas
Distance	321 ± 8 ly (98 ± 3 pc)
Absolute magnitude (M_{V})	−0.15

Details
Mass	1.36±0.19 M_{☉}
Radius	19.04±0.56 R_{☉}
Luminosity	131.0±6.8 L_{☉}
Surface gravity (log g)	2.02±0.08 cgs
Temperature	4,479±30 K
Metallicity [Fe/H]	−0.32±0.10 dex
Rotational velocity (v sin i)	1.0 km/s
Age	4.74±2.56 Gyr

Other designations
- φ Tau, 52 Tauri, BD+27°655, HD 27382, HIP 20250, HR 1348, SAO 76558, ADS 3137, WDS J04204+2721A

Database references
SIMBAD	data

Phi Tauri (φ Tauri) is a solitary, orange-hued star in the zodiac constellation of Taurus. It has an apparent visual magnitude of +4.96, which indicates the star is faintly visible to the naked eye. Based upon an annual parallax shift of 10.16 mas as seen from Earth, it is located roughly 321 light years distant from the Sun. At that distance, the visual magnitude of the star is diminished by an extinction factor of 0.27 due to interstellar dust.

This is an evolved, K-type giant star with a stellar classification of K1 III, currently (97% probability) on the red giant branch. It has an estimated 1.36 times the mass of the Sun and has expanded to 19 times the Sun's radius. At the age of roughly five billion years, it is radiating 131 times the Sun's luminosity from its inflated photosphere at an effective temperature of 4,479 K.

Phi Tauri has a magnitude 7.51 visual companion located at an angular separation of 48.80 arc seconds along a position angle of 258°, as of 2015. The pair form a yellow and blue double that is visible in small telescopes. A fainter, magnitude 12.27 companion lies at a separation of 118.10 arc seconds along a position angle of 25°, as of 2001.

== Naming ==
- With κ^{1}, κ^{2}, υ and χ, it composed the Arabic were the Arabs' Al Kalbain, the Two Dogs. According to the catalogue of stars in the Technical Memorandum 33-507 - A Reduced Star Catalog Containing 537 Named Stars, Al Kalbain were the title for five stars : this star (φ) as Alkalbain I, χ as Alkalbain II, κ^{1} as Alkalbain III, κ^{2} as Alkalbain IV and υ as Alkalbain V.
- In Chinese, 礪石 (Lì Dàn), meaning Whetstone, refers to an asterism consisting of φ Tauri, ψ Tauri, 44 Tauri and χ Tauri. Consequently, the Chinese name for φ Tauri itself is 礪石四 (Lì Dàn sì, English: the Fourth Star of Whetstone.).
