= Chi Tauri =

Star in the constellation Taurus

- Location of χ Tauri (circled)

Observation data Epoch J2000 Equinox ICRS
- Constellation: Taurus
- χ Tau A
- Right ascension: 04^{h} 22^{m} 34.944^{s}
- Declination: +25° 37′ 45.53″
- Apparent magnitude (V): 5.378
- χ Tau B
- Right ascension: 04^{h} 22^{m} 35.550^{s}
- Declination: +25° 38′ 03.22″
- Apparent magnitude (V): 8.423

Characteristics

χ Tau A
- Spectral type: B9V
- U−B color index: -0.12
- B−V color index: -0.04

χ Tau B
- Spectral type: F8 + G6 + K4 + K4
- U−B color index: +0.10
- B−V color index: +0.63

Astrometry

χ Tau A
Radial velocity (R_{v})	+15.3±3.4 km/s
Proper motion (μ)	RA: +20.953 mas/yr Dec.: −16.495 mas/yr
Parallax (π)	11.0472±0.1599 mas
Distance	295 ± 4 ly (91 ± 1 pc)
Absolute magnitude (M_{V})	+0.82±0.18

χ Tau B
Radial velocity (R_{v})	+14.694±0.081 km/s
Proper motion (μ)	RA: 15.766 mas/yr Dec.: −20.396 mas/yr
Parallax (π)	11.5348±0.0857 mas
Distance	283 ± 2 ly (86.7 ± 0.6 pc)
Absolute magnitude (M_{V})	Combined: +3.85±0.18; Ba: 4.20±0.18; Bb: 5.27±0.18; Bc: 7.87 / 7.87

Orbit
Primary	χ Tau Ba
Name	χ Tau Bb
Period (P)	17.602309 ± 0.000036 d
Eccentricity (e)	0.2938±0.0013
Inclination (i)	53.3±0.5°
Periastron epoch (T)	2,448,891.649±0.014
Argument of periastron (ω) (secondary)	249.43±0.33°
Semi-amplitude (K_{1}) (primary)	41.287±0.080 km/s
Semi-amplitude (K_{2}) (secondary)	48.133±0.080 km/s

Orbit
Primary	χ Tau Bab
Name	χ Tau Bc
Period (P)	3,450.6±6.1 d
Eccentricity (e)	0.3560±0.0068
Inclination (i)	73±6°
Periastron epoch (T)	2,447,546.5±9.7
Argument of periastron (ω) (secondary)	250.3±1.5°
Semi-amplitude (K_{1}) (primary)	8.625±0.067 km/s

Details
Age	200±50 Myr

χ Tau A
Mass	2.60±0.05 M_{☉}
Radius	2.15 R_{☉}
Surface gravity (log g)	4.15 ± 0.14 cgs
Temperature	10,300±300 K
Rotational velocity (v sin i)	263 km/s

χ Tau Ba
Mass	1.19 M_{☉}
Surface gravity (log g)	4.5 cgs
Temperature	6,180±150 K
Rotational velocity (v sin i)	1±3 km/s

χ Tau Bb
Mass	1.02 M_{☉}
Surface gravity (log g)	4.5 cgs
Temperature	5,620±150 K
Rotational velocity (v sin i)	1±3 km/s

χ Tau Bc
Mass	~0.70 / 0.70 M_{☉}

Other designations
- χ Tau, 59 Tau, BD+25°707, HD 27638, HIP 20430, HR 1369, SAO 76573, ADS 3161 AB, CCDM J04226+2538AB

Database references
SIMBAD	χ Tau A
- χ Tau B

Chi Tauri, Latinised from χ Tauri, is a star system in the constellation of Taurus. Parallax measurements made by the Hipparcos spacecraft put it at a distance of about 291 light-years (89 parsecs) from Earth. The primary component has an apparent magnitude of about 5.4, meaning it is visible with the naked eye.

The main component of the system is Chi Tauri A. It is a B-type main-sequence star. Its mass is 2.6 times that of the Sun and its surface glows with an effective temperature of 10,300 K. It may be a binary star itself, as suggested from astrometric data from Hipparcos, although no orbit could be derived.

The secondary component of the system is Chi Tauri B, separated about 19″ from Chi Tauri A. It was thought to be a post-T Tauri star from its unusual spectrum, but later studies ruled this out. It is a double-lined spectroscopic binary—the two stars are not resolved but their spectra have periodic Doppler shifts indicating orbital motion. The two stars are an F-type star and a G-type star, respectively, and are designated Ba and Bb.

The radial velocity of Chi Tauri B has a slow drift indicating the presence of another star in the system. Designated Chi Tauri Bc, this massive object is too dim to be detected, but it appears in Chi Tauri B's spectrum as an infrared excess. Because of this infrared excess, this unseen component is thought to be a pair of K-type main-sequence stars both with masses 70% of the Sun's. The stars within the system appear to be dynamically interacting.

== Naming ==
- With φ, κ^{1}, κ^{2} and υ, it composed the Arabic were the Arabs' Al Kalbain, the Two Dogs. According to the catalogue of stars in the Technical Memorandum 33-507 - A Reduced Star Catalog Containing 537 Named Stars, Al Kalbain were the title for five stars: φ as Alkalbain I, this star (χ) as Alkalbain II, κ^{1} as Alkalbain III, κ^{2} as Alkalbain IV and υ as Alkalbain V.
- In Chinese, 礪石 (Lì Dàn), meaning Whetstone, refers to an asterism consisting of χ Tauri, ψ Tauri, 44 Tauri and φ Tauri. Consequently, the Chinese name for χ Tauri itself is 礪石三 (Lì Dàn sān, English: the Third Star of Whetstone).
