= Lembu =

Lembu may refer to:

- Empire Lilliput, a ship later named Lembu
- 97 Tauri, a star also named Lembu
- Lembu Sora, leader of a 1301 rebellion in Java

== See also ==
- Lembus
