= Zeta Tauri =

Binary star in the constellation Taurus

ζ Tauri
- Location of ζ Tauri (circled)

Observation data Epoch J2000.0 Equinox J2000.0 (ICRS)
- Constellation: Taurus
- Right ascension: 05^{h} 37^{m} 38.68542^{s}
- Declination: +21° 08′ 33.1588″
- Apparent magnitude (V): 3.010 (2.88–3.17)

Characteristics
- Spectral type: B2 IIIpe
- U−B color index: −0.749
- B−V color index: −0.164
- Variable type: γ Cas

Astrometry
Radial velocity (R_{v})	+20 km/s
Proper motion (μ)	RA: +1.78 mas/yr Dec.: −20.07 mas/yr
Parallax (π)	7.33±0.82 mas
Distance	approx. 440 ly (approx. 140 pc)
Absolute magnitude (M_{V})	−2.67

Orbit
Period (P)	132.987 d
Semi-major axis (a)	1.17 AU
Eccentricity (e)	0.0 (assumed)
Inclination (i)	92.8°
Longitude of the node (Ω)	−58.0°
Periastron epoch (T)	2,447,025.6 HJD
Argument of periastron (ω) (secondary)	0.0 (assumed)°
Semi-amplitude (K_{1}) (primary)	7.43 km/s

Details

ζ Tau A
Mass	11.2 M_{☉}
Radius	5.5 R_{☉}
Luminosity	4,169 L_{☉}
Temperature	15,500 K
Rotational velocity (v sin i)	125 km/s
Age	22.5 ± 2.6 Myr

ζ Tau B
Mass	0.94 M_{☉}

Other designations
- Tianguan, 123 Tauri, HR 1910, HD 37202, BD+21°908, FK5 211, HIP 26451, SAO 77336, GC 6985

Database references
SIMBAD	data

Zeta Tauri (ζ Tauri, abbreviated Zeta Tau, ζ Tau) is a binary star in the zodiac constellation of Taurus, the Bull. It has an apparent visual magnitude of about 3.0, which is bright enough to be seen with the naked eye. Parallax measurements place it at a distance of roughly 440 light-years from the Sun. The position of this system near the ecliptic means it is subject to lunar occultation.

The two components are designated Zeta Tauri A (officially named Tianguan /tiænˈɡwɑːn/) and Zeta Tauri B.

== Nomenclature ==
ζ Tauri (Latinised to Zeta Tauri) is the star's Bayer designation; it also bears the Flamsteed designation of 123 Tauri. The designations of the two components as Zeta Tauri A and B derive from the convention used by the Washington Multiplicity Catalog (WMC) for multiple star systems, and adopted by the International Astronomical Union (IAU).

In Chinese astronomy, Zeta Tauri is called 天關, Pinyin: Tiānguān, formerly transliterated Tien Kwan, meaning Celestial [Frontier] Gate, an asterism within the Net (畢宿 Bì Xiù) mansion). 天關 (Tiānguān) has also been transliterated as Tien Kwan. (Technically, Tiānguān refers not just to Zeta Tauri but to the Celestial Gate asterism of which Zeta Tauri is the main star, alongside 113, 126, 128, 129, 130 and 127 Tauri .) In 2016, the IAU organized a Working Group on Star Names (WGSN) to catalog and standardize proper names for stars. The WGSN decided to attribute proper names to individual stars rather than entire multiple systems. It approved the name Tianguan for the component Zeta Tauri A on 30 June 2017 and it is now so included in the List of IAU-approved Star Names.

== Properties ==
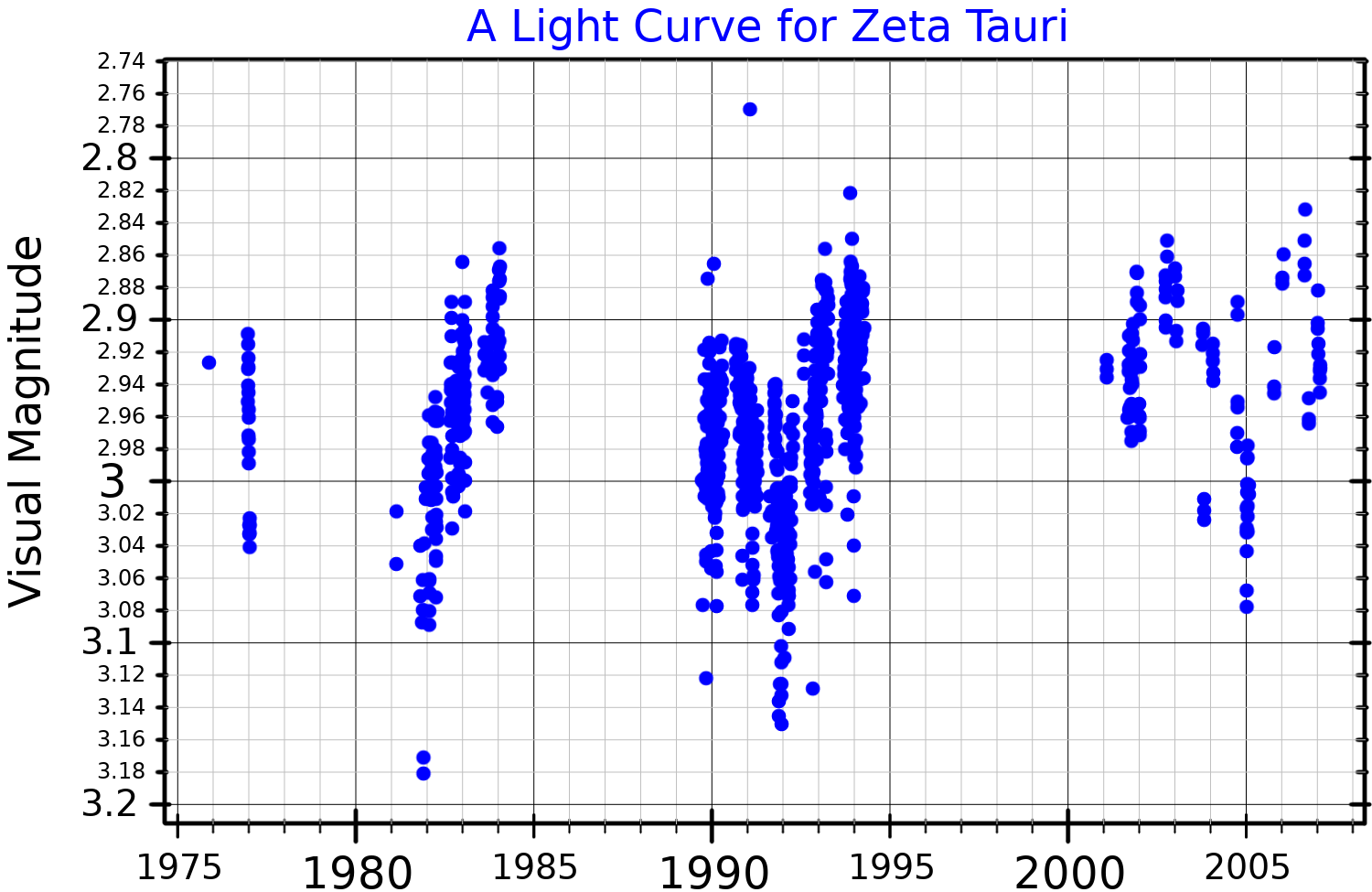
A visual band light curve for Zeta Tauri, adapted from Ruždjak et al. (2009)

Zeta Tauri is a single-lined spectroscopic binary system, which means the two components are orbiting so close to each other that they can not be resolved with a telescope. Instead, the orbital motion of the primary component is indicated by Doppler effect shifts in the absorption lines in its spectrum. The two components are separated by an estimated distance of about 1.17 astronomical units, or 117% of the distance from the Earth to the Sun. They are following circular orbits with a period of nearly 133 days.

Compared to the Sun, the primary, Zeta Tauri A, is an enormous star with more than 11 times the mass and 5–6 times the radius. It is rotating rapidly with a projected rotational velocity of 125 km s^{−1}. The spectrum of the primary component has a stellar classification of B2 IIIpe. A luminosity class of 'III' indicates this is a giant star that has exhausted the hydrogen at its core and evolved away from the main sequence. The 'p' suffix indicates an unspecified chemical peculiarity in the spectrum, while 'e' is used for stars that display emission lines. For Be stars such as this, the emission lines are produced by a rotating circumstellar disk of gas, made of material that has been ejected from the star's outer envelope. An oscillatory pattern in this spectrum is being caused by a single-armed spiral density wave in the disk. The disk may be precessing from the gravitational influence of the secondary component. The companion, Zeta Tauri B, has about 94% the mass of the Sun. It has been proposed that Zeta Tauri B is a white dwarf accreting the mass ejected from its Be star companion; this would explain its hard X-ray emission.

Zeta Tauri shows variation in its spectrum and brightness. The General Catalogue of Variable Stars lists it as an eclipsing variable and a Gamma Cassiopeiae variable, but it may not be either. Hrvoje Božić and Krešimer Pavlovski, of Hvar Observatory in Croatia, monitored the brightness of Zeta Tauri from 1981 to 1986 and noticed an eclipse like effect in the light curve. A latter study of all the available photometric data, including from the Hipparcos spacecraft, failed to confirm the presence of eclipses.

== See also ==
- Chinese constellations
- White Tiger (mythology)
