= Iota Tauri =

Double star in the constellation Taurus

ι Tauri
- Location of ι Tauri (circled)

Observation data Epoch J2000 Equinox ICRS
- Constellation: Taurus
- Right ascension: 05^{h} 03^{m} 05.74725^{s}
- Declination: +21° 35′ 23.8627″
- Apparent magnitude (V): 4.62

Characteristics
- Evolutionary stage: main sequence
- Spectral type: A7 V
- U−B color index: +0.15
- B−V color index: +0.16

Astrometry
Radial velocity (R_{v})	+38.30 km/s
Proper motion (μ)	RA: +68.88 mas/yr Dec.: -41.06 mas/yr
Parallax (π)	18.88±0.30 mas
Distance	173 ± 3 ly (53.0 ± 0.8 pc)
Absolute magnitude (M_{V})	1.00

Details
Mass	2.22 M_{☉}
Radius	2.6 R_{☉}
Luminosity	36 L_{☉}
Surface gravity (log g)	3.97 cgs
Temperature	8,054 K
Metallicity [Fe/H]	+0.15 dex
Rotational velocity (v sin i)	131 km/s
Age	717 Myr

Other designations
- ι Tau, 102 Tauri, BD+21°751, FK5 184, GC 6158, HD 32301, HIP 23497, HR 1620, SAO 76920, WDS J05031+2135AB, GSC 01293-02747

Database references
SIMBAD	data

Iota Tauri, Latinized from ι Tauri, is a white-hued star in the zodiac constellation Taurus and an outlying member of the Hyades star cluster. It is visible to the naked eye with an apparent visual magnitude of 4.62, and is located at an estimated distance of about 173 light years based upon parallax measurements. The star is moving away from the Sun with a radial velocity of +38 km/s.

This has been reported as a double star with two components at separation 0.1", both of type A7V and magnitude 5.4. The combined spectrum matches a stellar classification of A7 V, which would normally indicate an A-type main-sequence star that is generating energy through hydrogen fusion at its core. It has an estimated age of 717 million years.

In Chinese astronomy, the asterism Tiāngāo (天高, Celestial High Terrace) consists of the stars ι Tauri, 97 Tauri, 107 Tauri, and 109 Tauri. (Note: Stellarium, citing Yi Shitong, 1981) The Chinese name for ι Tauri itself is Tiāngāoyī (天高一), the first star of Tiāngāo.
