= HR 1099 =

Triple star system in the constellation Taurus

- Location of HR 1099 (circled)

Observation data Epoch J2000 Equinox ICRS
- Constellation: Taurus
- A
- Right ascension: 03^{h} 36^{m} 47.291^{s}
- Declination: +00° 35′ 15.94″
- Apparent magnitude (V): 5.91
- B
- Right ascension: 03^{h} 36^{m} 46.844^{s}
- Declination: +00° 35′ 15.93″
- Apparent magnitude (V): 8.79

Characteristics
- Spectral type: K2:Vnk (K1 IV + G5 V + K3 V)
- Variable type: RS CVn

Astrometry

A
Radial velocity (R_{v})	−21.24±6.62 km/s
Proper motion (μ)	RA: −32.894 mas/yr Dec.: −161.772 mas/yr
Parallax (π)	33.7528±0.0866 mas
Distance	96.6 ± 0.2 ly (29.63 ± 0.08 pc)
Absolute magnitude (M_{V})	3.6

B
Radial velocity (R_{v})	−15.34±0.18 km/s
Proper motion (μ)	RA: −34.359 mas/yr Dec.: −138.137 mas/yr
Parallax (π)	33.8664±0.0226 mas
Distance	96.31 ± 0.06 ly (29.53 ± 0.02 pc)
Absolute magnitude (M_{V})	6.5

Orbit
Period (P)	2.83774 d
Semi-major axis (a)	10.3 R_{☉}
Eccentricity (e)	0.00 (assumed)
Inclination (i)	38°
Periastron epoch (T)	2,442,767.4 HJD
Argument of periastron (ω) (secondary)	0.00 (assumed)°
Semi-amplitude (K_{1}) (primary)	52.6 km/s
Semi-amplitude (K_{2}) (secondary)	64.1 km/s

Details

Component Aa
Mass	1.0 M_{☉}
Radius	3.7 R_{☉}
Surface gravity (log g)	3.30 cgs
Temperature	4,750 K
Metallicity [Fe/H]	−0.16 dex
Rotational velocity (v sin i)	39 km/s

Component Ab
Mass	0.8 M_{☉}
Radius	1.1 R_{☉}
Surface gravity (log g)	4.26 cgs
Temperature	5,500 K

Component B
Mass	0.78 M_{☉}
Radius	0.78 R_{☉}
Luminosity	0.30 L_{☉}
Surface gravity (log g)	4.55 cgs
Temperature	4,829 K
Metallicity [Fe/H]	+0.10 dex
Rotational velocity (v sin i)	4.1 km/s
Age	2.2 Gyr

Other designations
- STF 422, V711 Tau, BD+00°616, GC 4311, HD 22468, HIP 16846, HR 1099, SAO 111291, PPM 146726, ADS 2644, WDS J03368+0035

Database references
SIMBAD	data

HR 1099 is a triple star system in the equatorial constellation of Taurus, positioned 11′ to the north of the star 10 Tauri. This system has the variable star designation V711 Tauri, while HR 1099 is the star's identifier from the Bright Star Catalogue. It ranges in brightness from a combined apparent visual magnitude of 5.71 down to 5.94, which is bright enough to be dimly visible to the naked eye. The distance to this system is 96.6 light years based on parallax measurements, but it is drifting closer with a radial velocity of about −15 km/s.

This system was discovered to be a double star by F. G. W. Struve in 1822, with the components A and B having an angular separation of 5.4″. (The separation was measured at 6.7″ in 2016.) R. E. Wilson in 1953 determined that the brighter member of this pair, component A, has a variable radial velocity. In 1963, O. C. Wilson noted that the same component shows very high emission cores in the calcium H and K absorption lines. Follow-up observations by O. C. Wilson in 1964 showed that the hydrogen–α line of component A is fully in emission and it displays moderate broadening due to rotation. He found a stellar classification of K3 V for component B, matching an ordinary K-type main-sequence star.

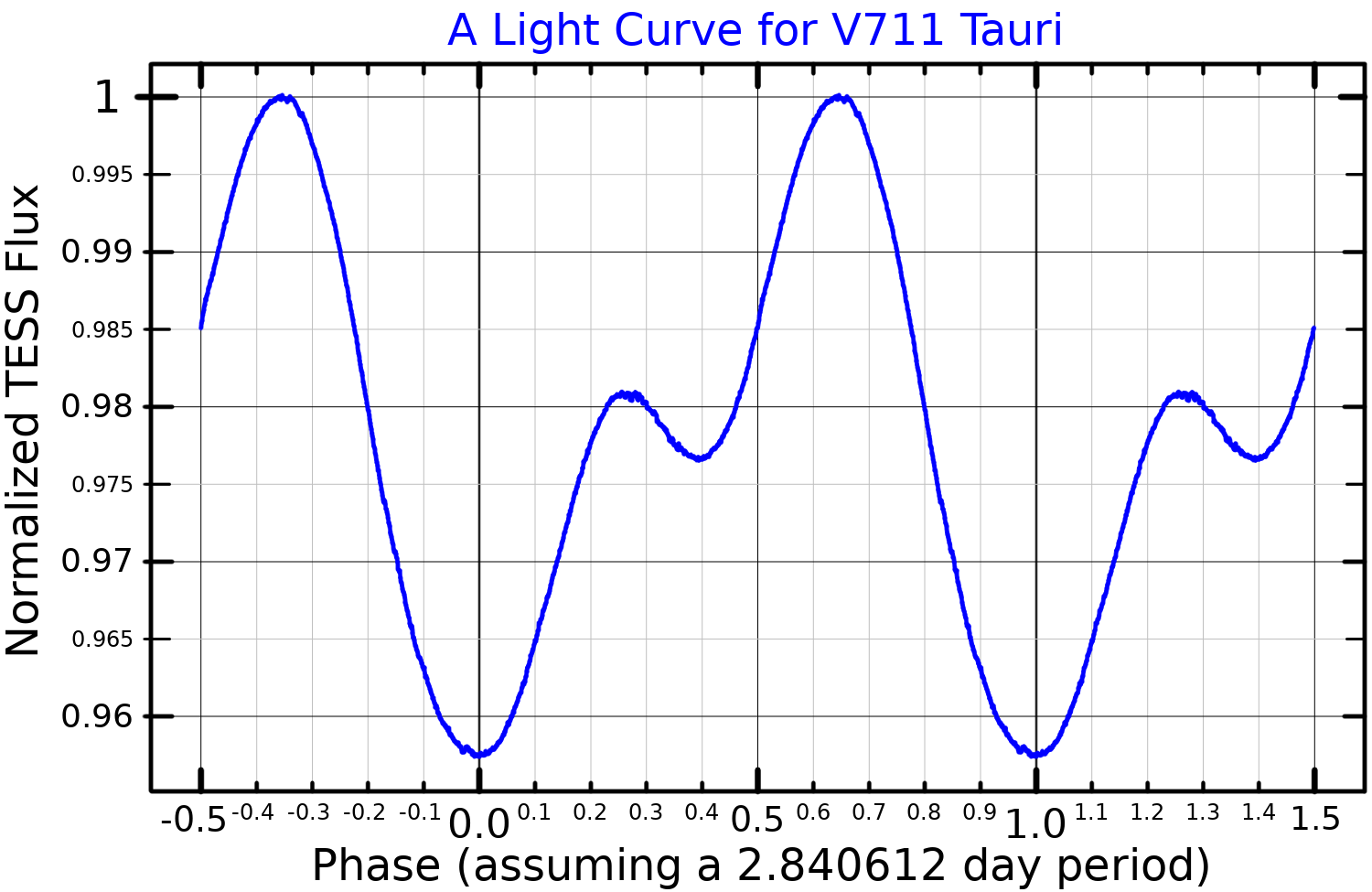
A light curve for V711 Tauri, plotted from TESS data

Observations during 1974–1975 demonstrated that component A is a spectroscopic binary star system of the RS Canum Venaticorum variable class. Given its average magnitude of around 5.9, it is one of the brighter known variables of this type. No eclipses were observed, but an orbital period of 2.838 days was determined. Most of the emission was found to be coming from the more massive member of this pair. Radio emission from the binary was detected by F. N. Owen in 1976. It was shown to be a soft X-ray source in 1978 using the HEAO 1 satellite.

This double-lined spectroscopic binary system consists of an evolving K-type subgiant and an ordinary G-type main sequence star. The two stars are orbiting so close to each other that their tidal effects are giving them an elliptical shape. The subgiant is filling about 80% of its Roche lobe. The chromosphere of the subgiant is one of the most active known, with a deep convective zone powering the magnetic dynamo. The G-type companion has a shallow convection zone and is less active.

In 1980, significant variations were found in some spectral features related to surface temperature, suggesting the presence of starspots. Doppler imaging confirmed these starspots are associated with the K subgiant. (It was the first cool star to have its surface Doppler imaged.) The evidence suggests that the spots first appear at low latitude then migrated toward the poles. These spots are much larger than they are on the Sun. About 70% of all spots have been observed at latitudes higher than 50°, particularly around the polar region. A polar spot has persisted for at least twenty years.

The baseline apparent magnitudes of the two stars, after subtracting the effects of starspots, is 5.80 and 7.20. Long term monitoring indicates the subgiant has two activity cycles, similar to the 11-year solar cycle. A 5.3±0.1 year cycle is associated with symmetrical flip-flopping of the spotted area between hemispheres. The longer 15–16 year cycle is a periodic variation in the total spot area. The global magnetic field of the star may be precessing with respect to the axis of rotation.

== See also ==
- UX Arietis
