= Delta Tauri =

Three star systems in the constellation Taurus

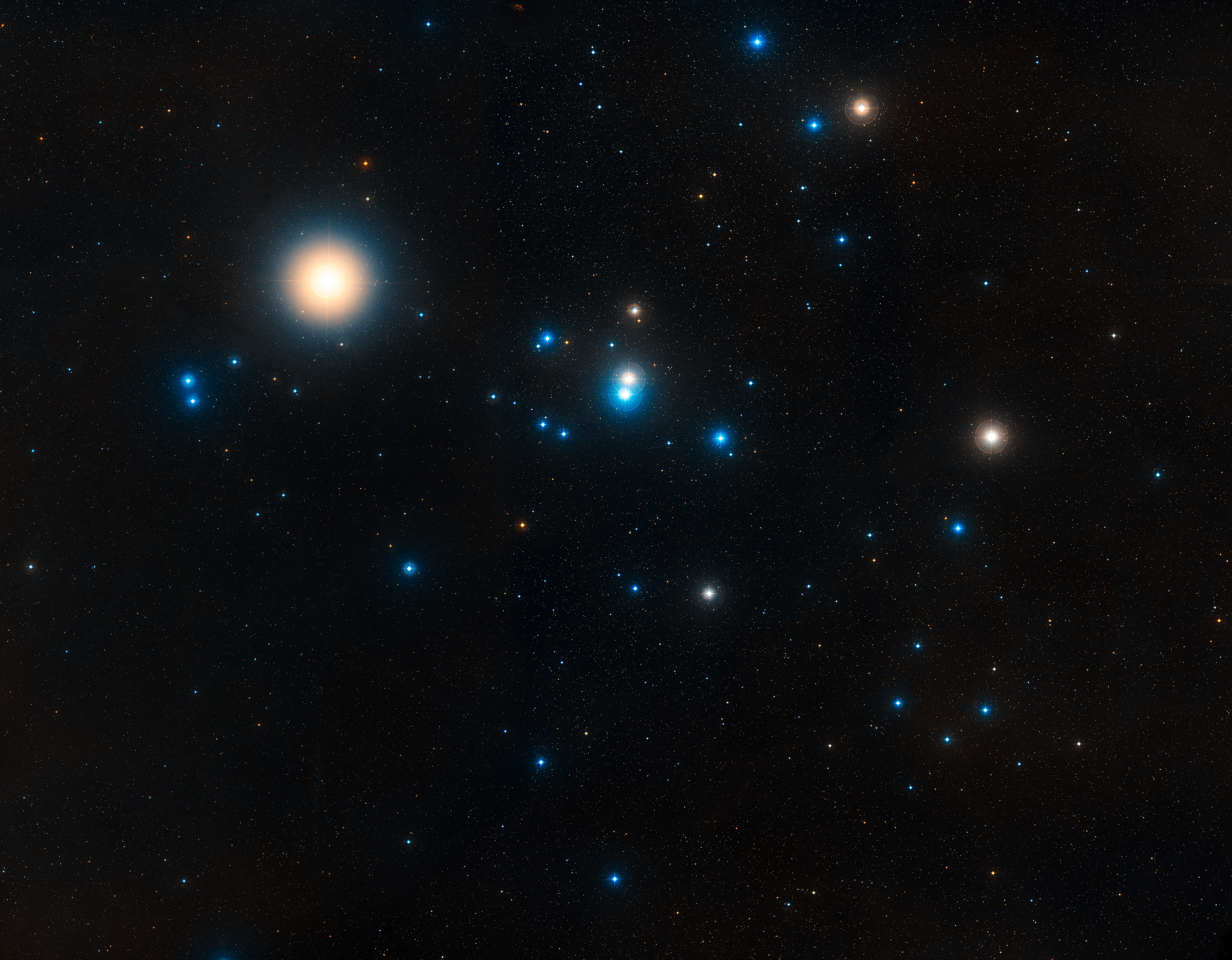
Hyades cluster. The three δ Tauri stars form a triangle at the top, with δ^{3} at the top, δ^{1} on the right, and δ^{2} on the left of the base.

The Bayer designation Delta Tauri (δ Tau, δ Tauri) is shared by three star systems in the constellation Taurus. They are all members of the Hyades star cluster.

- δ^{1} Tauri
- δ^{2} Tauri
- δ^{3} Tauri

Because they are close to the ecliptic, these stars can be occulted by the Moon and, very rarely, by planets.
