= Psalterium Georgii =

Former constellation

Psalterium Georgii (also Harpa Georgii) (Latin for George's harp) was a constellation created by Maximilian Hell in 1789 to honor George III of Great Britain. Johann ‍Bode ‍depicted ‍the ‍constellation ‍on ‍his ‍‍Uranographia ‍atlas ‍of ‍1801 under the name ‍Harpa ‍Georgii. It was created from stars in northern Eridanus and was next to the constellation Taurus, and included 10 Tauri, which was designated Gamma Psalterii Georgii by Hell and E by Bode. It is no longer in use.

== See also ==
- Former constellations
