= HD 28527 =

A-type star in the constellation Taurus

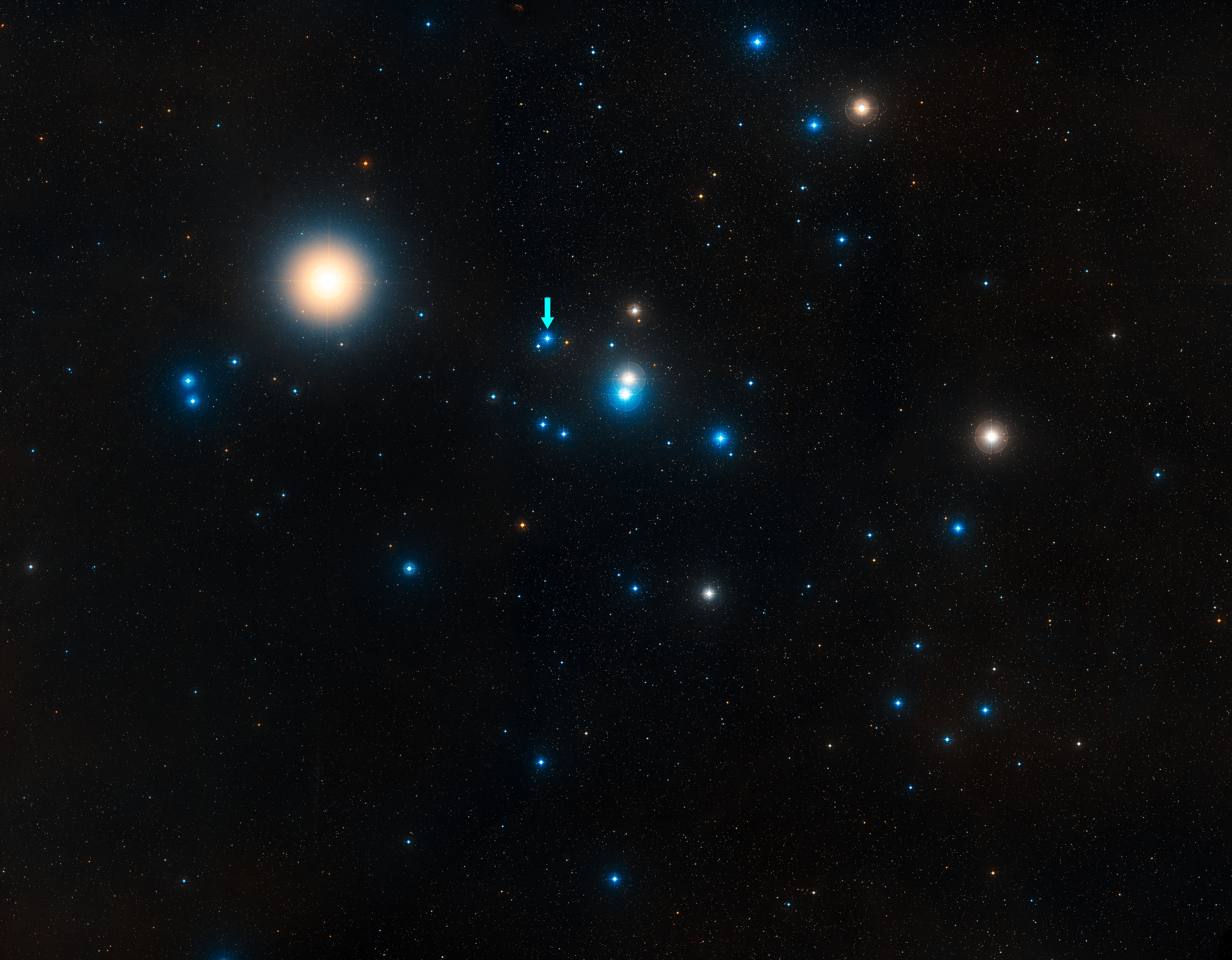
- Hyades cluster, with HD 28527 (marked with a green arrow) just NE of the θ Tauri pair

Observation data Epoch J2000 Equinox ICRS
- Constellation: Taurus
- Right ascension: 04^{h} 30^{m} 33.633^{s}
- Declination: +16° 11′ 38.45″
- Apparent magnitude (V): 4.78

Characteristics
- Evolutionary stage: main sequence
- Spectral type: A6 IV or A7 V
- B−V color index: +0.170±0.001
- Variable type: suspected δ Sct

Astrometry
Radial velocity (R_{v})	+38.1±0.8 km/s
Proper motion (μ)	RA: +104.889 mas/yr Dec.: −25.446 mas/yr
Parallax (π)	22.1875±0.1430 mas
Distance	147.0 ± 0.9 ly (45.1 ± 0.3 pc)
Absolute magnitude (M_{V})	+1.58

Details
Mass	1.75 M_{☉}
Radius	2.209 R_{☉}
Luminosity	19.03 L_{☉}
Surface gravity (log g)	4.17±0.14 cgs
Temperature	8,274±281 K
Metallicity [Fe/H]	+0.30 dex
Rotation	1.278 d
Rotational velocity (v sin i)	87.5 km/s
Age	307 Myr

Other designations
- NSV 1627, BD+15°637, GJ 170.1, GJ 9157, HD 28527, HIP 21029, HR 1427, SAO 93975

Database references
SIMBAD	data

HD 28527 is a star in the constellation Taurus, and a member of the Hyades open cluster. It is faintly visible to the naked eye with an apparent visual magnitude of 4.78. The distance to this star, as determined from its parallax shift of 22 mas, is 147 light years. It is moving away from the Earth with a heliocentric radial velocity of +38 km/s.

Based upon a stellar classification of A6 IV by Cowley et al. (1969), this is an A-type subgiant star that has consumed the hydrogen at its core and is evolving away from the main sequence. Older studies had it classed as an A-type main-sequence star with a class of A7 V. At the age of 307 million years, it has a high rate of spin, revolving upon its axis once every 1.278 days. It is a Delta Scuti variable with 1.75 times the mass of the Sun and 2.2 times the Sun's radius. The star is radiating 19 times the Sun's luminosity from its photosphere at an effective temperature of 8,274 K.

Due to its location near the ecliptic, this star is subject to lunar occultations. These events have provided occasional, but not definitive, evidence of a close secondary companion. Eggleton and Tokovinin (2008) catalogue this as a possible triple star system, having the inner pair being similar stars with an angular separation of 0.02″, and the outer component a magnitude 6.7 star of class F2 at a much wider separation of 250″. The wide companion is HD 28458, another member of the Hyades.

== See also ==
- Taurus (Chinese astronomy)
- List of stars in Taurus
