= 72 Tauri =

Star in the constellation of Taurus

- Location of 72 Tauri (circled)

Observation data Epoch J2000.0 Equinox J2000.0 (ICRS)
- Constellation: Taurus
- Right ascension: 04^{h} 27^{m} 17.4508^{s}
- Declination: +22° 59′ 46.778″
- Apparent magnitude (V): 5.514

Characteristics
- Evolutionary stage: main sequence
- Spectral type: B7V
- U−B color index: −0.48
- B−V color index: −0.10

Astrometry
Radial velocity (R_{v})	32.2±1.1 km/s
Proper motion (μ)	RA: −1.409 mas/yr Dec.: −13.722 mas/yr
Parallax (π)	7.9390±0.398 mas
Distance	410 ± 20 ly (126 ± 6 pc)
Absolute magnitude (M_{V})	+0.21

Details
Mass	3.47 M_{☉}
Radius	2.8 R_{☉}
Luminosity	185 L_{☉}
Surface gravity (log g)	3.97 cgs
Temperature	12,689 K
Rotational velocity (v sin i)	115 km/s
Age	38 Myr

Other designations
- υ^{2} Tau, 72 Tauri, BD+22°699, HD 28149, HIP 20789, HR 1399

Database references
SIMBAD	data

72 Tauri (abbreviated 72 Tau) is a possible binary star in the zodiac constellation of Taurus. It is faintly visible to the naked eye with an apparent visual magnitude of +5.5, although only 0.29° from the brighter υ Tauri. Based upon an annual parallax shift of 7.9 mas seen from Earth, it is around 410 light years from the Sun.

== Properties ==
72 Tauri is a B-type main sequence star with a stellar classification of B7V. With a mass of 3.48 M_{☉} and an estimated age of 38 million years, it is 2.8 times the size of the Sun and 185 times its luminosity.

Occasionally this star system is given the Bayer designation υ^{2} Tauri with υ Tauri, which is separated from it by 0.29° in the sky. υ Tauri is a foreground star, the two are unrelated, and although 72 Tauri lies near the Hyades open cluster, it is much further away.

72 Tauri lies near the ecliptic and can be occulted by the moon. Observations of an occultation in 1985 showed that it was a binary star with the two components separated by 0.1″. There has been no confirmation of this finding and other sources list the star as single.
