= Upsilon Tauri =

Star in the constellation of Taurus

υ Tauri
- Location of υ Tauri (circled)

Observation data Epoch J2000.0 Equinox J2000.0 (ICRS)
- Constellation: Taurus
- Right ascension: 04^{h} 26^{m} 18.46368^{s}
- Declination: +22° 48′ 48.8885″
- Apparent magnitude (V): 4.28 – 4.31

Characteristics
- Evolutionary stage: main sequence
- Spectral type: A8 Vn
- U−B color index: +0.14
- B−V color index: +0.25
- Variable type: δ Scuti

Astrometry
Radial velocity (R_{v})	32.2±1.1 km/s
Proper motion (μ)	RA: +108.81 mas/yr Dec.: −46.80 mas/yr
Parallax (π)	21.21±0.25 mas
Distance	154 ± 2 ly (47.1 ± 0.6 pc)
Absolute magnitude (M_{V})	+0.91

Details
Mass	1.55 M_{☉}
Radius	1.803 R_{☉}
Luminosity	32.5 L_{☉}
Surface gravity (log g)	3.50 cgs
Temperature	7,398±252 K
Rotation	0.415 d
Rotational velocity (v sin i)	243 km/s
Age	827 Myr

Other designations
- υ Tau, υ^{1} Tau, 69 Tauri, BD+22 696, FK5 2326, HD 28024, HIP 20711, HR 1392, SAO 76608

Database references
SIMBAD	data

Upsilon Tauri (υ Tauri) is a solitary, white-hued star in the zodiac constellation of Taurus, and is a member of the Hyades star cluster. It is faintly visible to the naked eye with an apparent visual magnitude of +4.3. Based upon an annual parallax shift of 21.21 mas seen from Earth, it is around 154 light years from the Sun.

== Properties ==
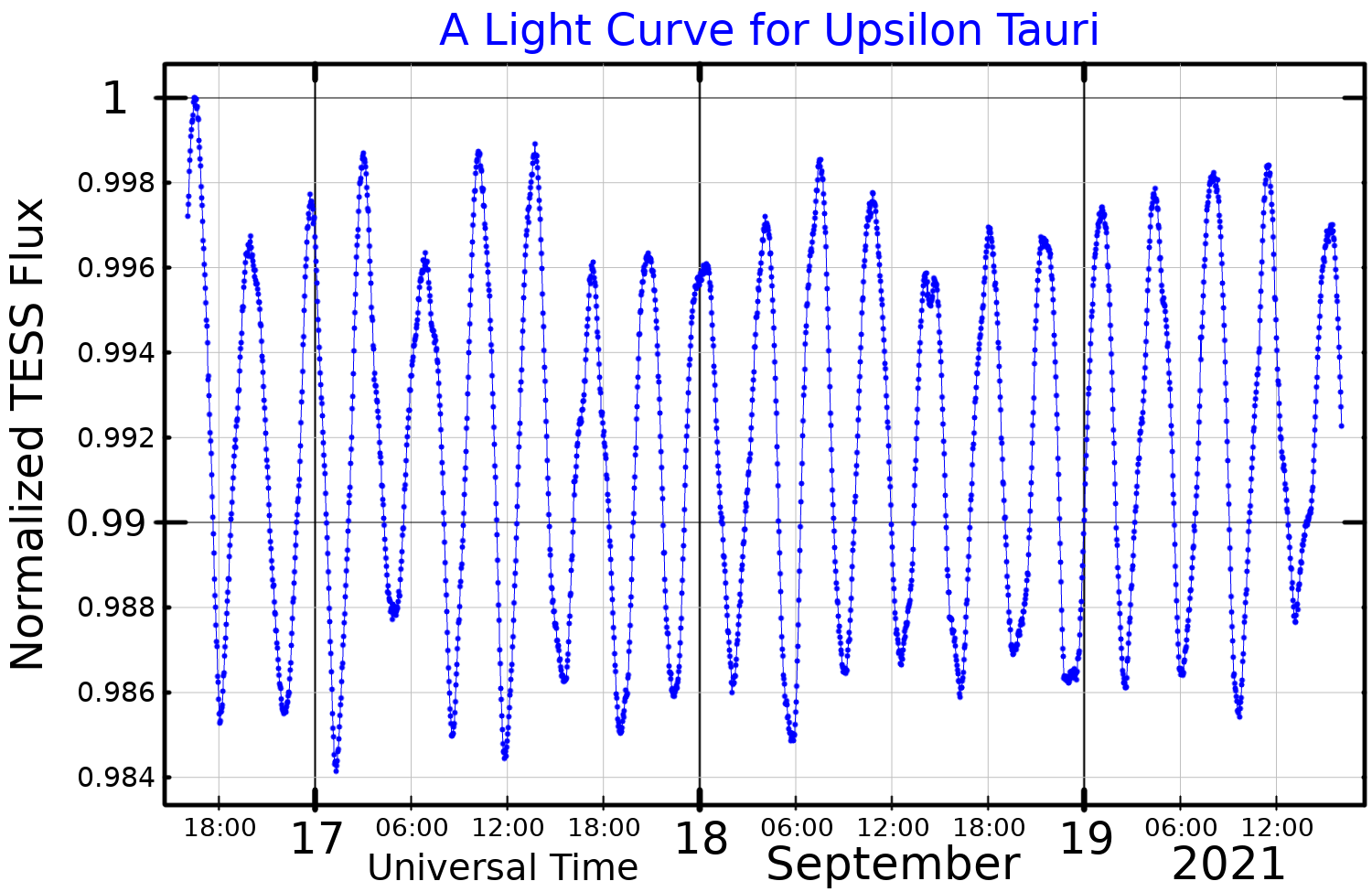
A light curve for Upsilon Tauri, plotted from TESS data

This is an A-type main sequence star with a stellar classification of A8 Vn. It is classified as a Delta Scuti type variable star and its brightness varies from magnitude +4.28 to +4.31 with a period of 3.56 hours. At an estimated age of 827 million years, it is spinning rapidly with a rotation period of just 0.415 days. This is giving the star an oblate shape with an equatorial bulge that is 9% larger than the polar radius.

Occasionally this star system shares the Bayer designation υ Tauri with 72 Tauri, which is separated from it by 0.29° in the sky.

== Naming ==
With φ, κ^{1}, κ^{2} and χ, it composed the Arabic were the Arabs' Al Kalbain, the Two Dogs. According to the catalogue of stars in the Technical Memorandum 33-507 - A Reduced Star Catalog Containing 537 Named Stars, Al Kalbain were the title for five stars : φ as Alkalbain I, χ as Alkalbain II, κ^{1} as Alkalbain III, κ^{2} as Alkalbain IV and this star (υ) as Alkalbain V.
