= Tau Tauri =

Star system in the constellation Taurus

- Location of τ Tauri (circled)

Observation data Epoch J2000 Equinox ICRS
- Constellation: Taurus
- Right ascension: 04^{h} 42^{m} 14.70161^{s}
- Declination: +22° 57′ 24.9214″
- Apparent magnitude (V): 4.27

Characteristics
- Spectral type: B3V + ? + A0V–A2V + A1V
- U−B color index: -0.57
- B−V color index: -0.14

Astrometry
Radial velocity (R_{v})	+14.60 km/s
Proper motion (μ)	RA: -2.89 mas/yr Dec.: -21.86 mas/yr
Parallax (π)	8.19±0.88 mas
Distance	approx. 400 ly (approx. 120 pc)
Absolute magnitude (M_{V})	-1.15

Orbit
Primary	Aa
Period (P)	2.956549±0.000002 d
Semi-major axis (a)	≤ 0.01455 AU
Eccentricity (e)	0.051±0.019
Periastron epoch (T)	2,436,424.207±0.009 JD
Argument of periastron (ω) (secondary)	126.7±21.8°
Semi-amplitude (K_{1}) (primary)	53.6±1.0 km/s

Details

Aa
Mass	6.4 M_{☉}
Luminosity	1,472 L_{☉}
Surface gravity (log g)	2.60 cgs
Temperature	18,700 K
Metallicity [Fe/H]	-0.51 dex
Rotational velocity (v sin i)	115 km/s

Other designations
- Gaja, τ Tau, 94 Tauri, BD+22°739, FK5 174, GC 5716, HD 29763, HIP 21881, HR 1497, SAO 76721, CCDM J04422+2257AB, WDS J04422+2257A, GSC 01830-02129

Database references
SIMBAD	data

Tau Tauri, also named Gaja, is a quadruple star system in the constellation Taurus. It is visible to the naked eye as a faint point of light with a combined apparent visual magnitude of 4.33. The distance to this system is approximately about 400 light years based on parallax. The system is moving further from the Earth with a heliocentric radial velocity of +14.6 km/s, and it is a member of the Taurion OB association, located between Orion and Taurus. It is located 0.7 degree north of the ecliptic, and thus is subject to lunar occultations.

The blue-white hued primary, component Aa, is a B-type main-sequence star with a stellar classification of B3V. It was found to be a close spectroscopic binary in 1903 by American astronomers Edwin B. Frost and Walter S. Adams. The pair have an orbital period of 2.96 days and eccentricity of 0.05. A second companion, white-hued component Ab, has magnitude 6.97 and angular separation 0.2" from the primary in a 58-year orbit. This is a probably A-type main-sequence star with a class of A0V–A2V. The more distant component B is a type A1V star with magnitude 7.2 and separation 62.8".

== Nomenclature ==
Tau Tauri, Latinized from τ Tauri, is the star's Bayer designation. The term gaja(h) (Sanskrit: गज) means elephant, and is the name of a constellation from Bali (Indonesia) corresponding to Taurus, attested in the cultural calendar called Palelintangan. The IAU Working Group on Star Names approved the name Gaja for Tau Tauri Aa (in the elephant's tusk) on 22 February 2026.

== See also ==
- 97 Tauri, named Lembu from another Balinese constellation in Taurus
