= Kappa Tauri =

Star in the constellation Taurus

- Location of κ Tauri (circled in red)

Observation data Epoch J2000.0 Equinox
Constellation	Taurus
- κ^{1} Tau
Right ascension	04^{h} 25^{m} 22.16505^{s}
Declination	+22° 17′ 37.9375″
- Apparent magnitude (V): +4.22
- κ^{2} Tau
Right ascension	04^{h} 25^{m} 25.01518^{s}
Declination	+22° 11′ 59.9876″
- Apparent magnitude (V): +5.24

Characteristics

κ^{1} Tau
- Spectral type: A7IV-V
- U−B color index: +0.12
- B−V color index: +0.14

κ^{2} Tau
- Spectral type: A7V
- U−B color index: +0.09
- B−V color index: +0.17

Astrometry

κ^{1} Tau
Radial velocity (R_{v})	+37.30 km/s
Proper motion (μ)	RA: +105.10 mas/yr Dec.: −45.04 mas/yr
Parallax (π)	21.19±0.21 mas
Distance	154 ± 2 ly (47.2 ± 0.5 pc)
Absolute magnitude (M_{V})	+0.96

κ^{2} Tau
Radial velocity (R_{v})	+32.00 km/s
Proper motion (μ)	RA: +111.97 mas/yr Dec.: −47.71 mas/yr
Parallax (π)	22.03±0.35 mas
Distance	148 ± 2 ly (45.4 ± 0.7 pc)
Absolute magnitude (M_{V})	+2.18

Details

κ^{1} Tau
Radius	2.60 R_{☉}
Luminosity	33.6 L_{☉}
Temperature	9,000 K
Rotational velocity (v sin i)	94 km/s

κ^{2} Tau
Luminosity	11.8 L_{☉}
Temperature	7,400 K
Rotational velocity (v sin i)	191 km/s

Other designations
- κ Tau, ADS 3201
- κ^{1} Tau: 65 Tauri, BD+21 642, HD 27934, HIP 20635, HR 1387, SAO 76601
- κ^{2} Tau: 67 Tauri, BD+21 643, HD 27946, HIP 20641, HR 1388, SAO 76602

Database references
SIMBAD	κ^{1} Tau
- κ^{2} Tau

Kappa Tauri (κ Tau, κ Tauri) is a double star in the constellation Taurus, the two components κ^{1} Tauri and κ^{2} Tauri both members of the Hyades open cluster. The pair are approximately 150 light years from Earth and are separated from each other by about six light years.

== System ==
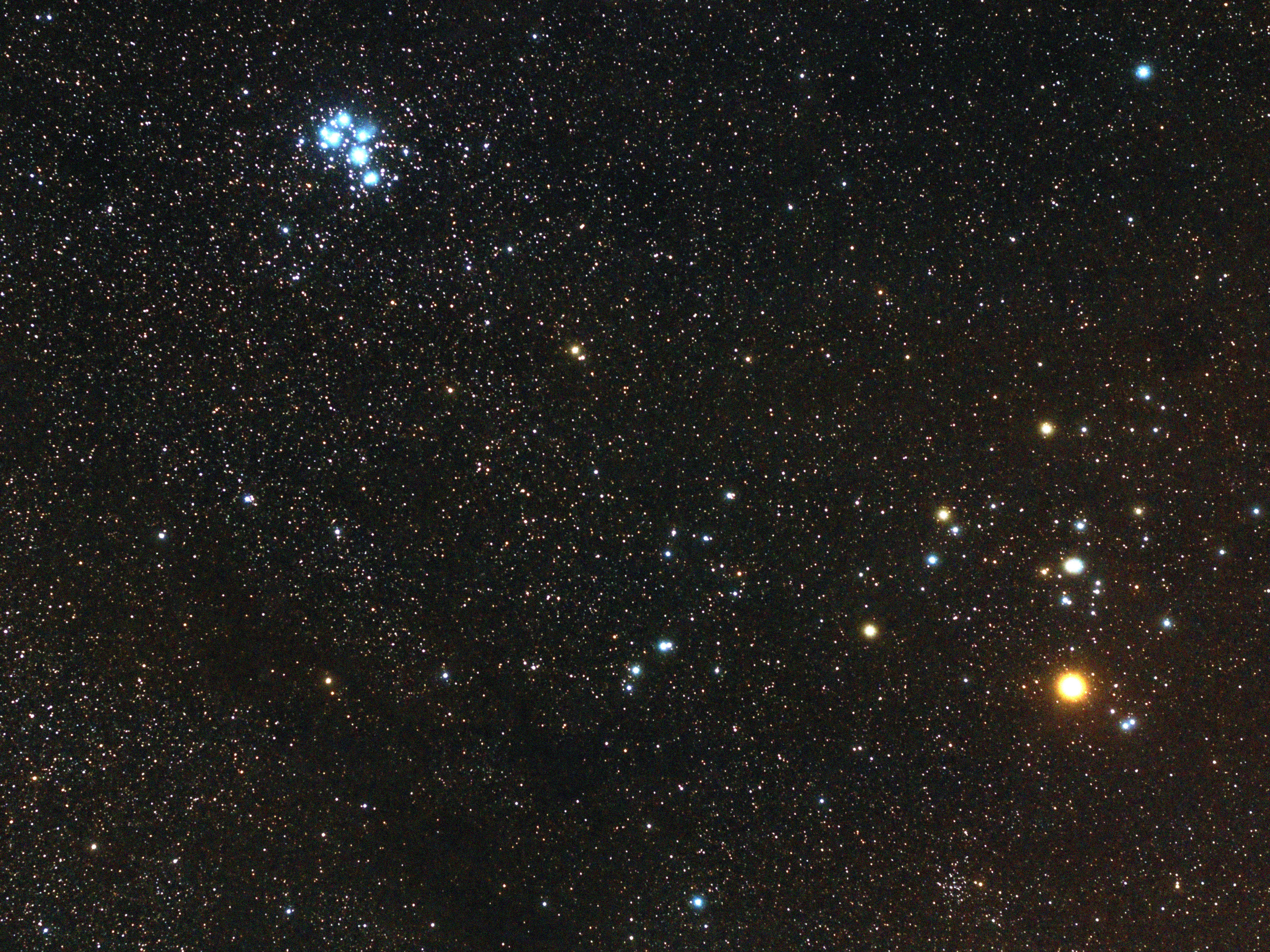
Pleiades and Hyades with κ Tauri as the very close pair at lower centre (north is approximately to the left)

The system is dominated by a visual double star, κ^{1} Tauri and κ^{2} Tauri. κ^{1} Tauri is a white A-type subgiant with an apparent magnitude of +4.22. It is emitting an excess of infrared radiation at a temperature indicating there is a circumstellar disk in orbit at a radius of 67 AU from the star. κ^{2} Tauri is a white A-type main sequence star with an apparent magnitude of +5.24.

Between the two bright stars is a binary star made up of two 9th magnitude stars, Kappa Tauri C and Kappa Tauri D, which are 5.5 arcseconds from each other (as of 2013) and 175.1 arcseconds from κ^{1} Tau. Two more 12th magnitude companions fill out the visual group: Kappa Tauri E, which is 145 arcseconds from κ^{1} Tau, and Kappa Tauri F, 108.5 arcseconds away from κ^{2} Tau.

The bright pair are both members of the Hyades star cluster, while the fainter stars are all much more distant background stars.

== Test of General Relativity ==
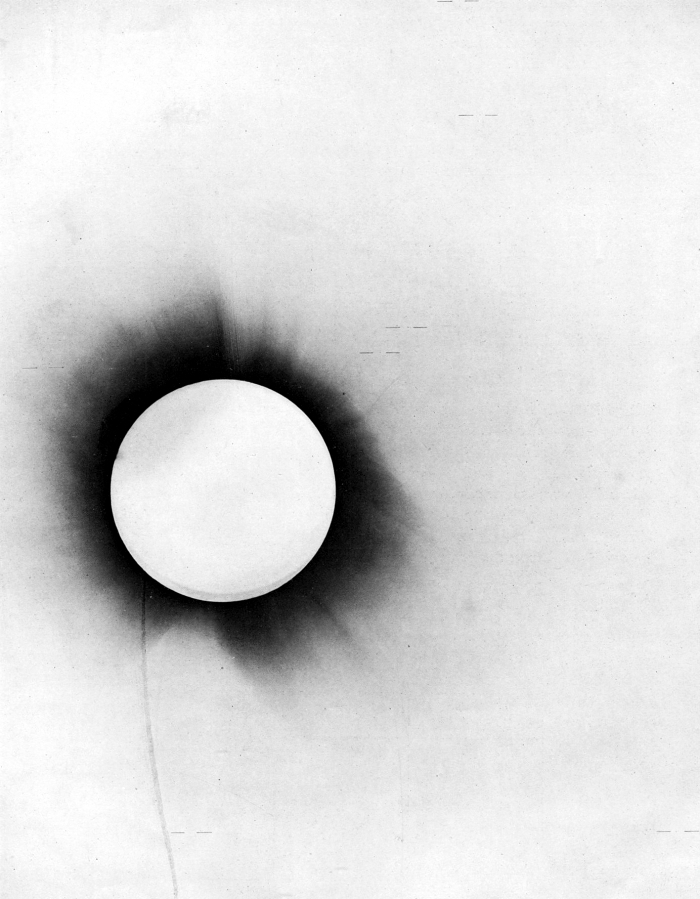
One of the 1919 eclipse negatives, with κ^{1} and κ^{2} Tauri marked near the centre of the image

Kappa Tauri was photographed during the solar eclipse of May 29, 1919 by the expedition of Arthur Eddington in Príncipe and others in Sobral, Brazil that confirmed Albert Einstein's prediction of the bending of light around the Sun from his general theory of relativity which he published in 1915.

== Naming ==
- With φ, υ and χ, it composed the Arabic were the Arabs' Al Kalbain, the Two Dogs. According to the catalogue of stars in the Technical Memorandum 33-507 - A Reduced Star Catalog Containing 537 Named Stars, Al Kalbain were the title for five stars: φ as Alkalbain I, χ as Alkalbain II, these stars (κ^{2} and κ^{1}) are Alkalbain III and Alkalbain IV, and υ as Alkalbain V.
- In Chinese, 天街 (Tiān Jiē), meaning Celestial Street, refers to an asterism consisting of κ^{1} Tauri and ω Tauri. Consequently, κ^{1} Tauri itself is known as 天街一 (Tiān Jiē yī, English: the First Star Star of Celestial Street).
