= 97 Tauri =

Star in the constellation Taurus

- Location of 97 Tauri (circled in red)

Observation data Epoch J2000 Equinox J2000
- Constellation: Taurus
- Right ascension: 04^{h} 51^{m} 22.46353^{s}
- Declination: +18° 50′ 23.4859″
- Apparent magnitude (V): 5.09 to 5.13

Characteristics
- Evolutionary stage: main sequence
- Spectral type: A9V or A7IV-V
- B−V color index: 0.214
- Variable type: δ Sct

Astrometry
Radial velocity (R_{v})	+39.1±1.2 km/s
Proper motion (μ)	RA: +82.319 mas/yr Dec.: −35.743 mas/yr
Parallax (π)	26.1221±0.7454 mas
Distance	125 ± 4 ly (38 ± 1 pc)
Absolute magnitude (M_{V})	1.53

Details
Mass	1.7 M_{☉}
Radius	2.6 R_{☉}
Luminosity	10.7 L_{☉}
Surface gravity (log g)	3.8 cgs
Temperature	7543 K
Metallicity [Fe/H]	−0.63 dex
Rotational velocity (v sin i)	180 km/s
Age	1.02 Gyr

Other designations
- Lembu, i Tau, 97 Tau, V480 Tau, BD+18 743, HD 30780, HIP 22565, HR 1547, SAO 94164

Database references
SIMBAD	data

97 Tauri, also named Lembu, is a star about 125 light-years (38 parsecs) away in the constellation Taurus. With an apparent magnitude of about 5.1, it is faintly visible to the naked eye under good viewing conditions. It is a member of the Hyades star cluster. Because it is close to the ecliptic, this star can be occulted by the Moon.

The stellar classification of 97 Tauri is reported by different sources as A9V or A7IV-V, indicating an A-type main-sequence star or possibly a subgiant. It is a rapidly rotating star, with a projected rotational velocity of 180 km/s. It is classified as a Delta Scuti variable, and has been given the variable star designation V480 Tauri.

97 Tauri forms an optical double with the faint G-type main-sequence star HD 286053, whose parallax indicates that it is an unrelated background object.

== Nomenclature ==
97 Tauri is the star's Flamsteed designation; it also has the Bayer designation i Tauri. In Chinese astronomy, the asterism Tiāngāo (天高, Celestial High Terrace) consists of the stars 97 Tauri, ι Tauri, 107 Tauri, and 109 Tauri. (Note: Stellarium, citing Yi Shitong (1981))

In Bali (Indonesia), Lěmbu refers to a constellation (lintang) of an ox, corresponding to the Western constellation Taurus, the bull. The IAU Working Group on Star Names adopted the name Lembu for 97 Tauri on 17 May 2026.

== See also ==
- Tau Tauri, named Gaja from another Balinese constellation in Taurus
