= 10 Tauri =

Star in the constellation Taurus

- Location of 10 Tauri (circled)

Observation data Epoch J2000 Equinox ICRS
- Constellation: Taurus
- Right ascension: 03^{h} 36^{m} 52.38^{s}
- Declination: +00° 24′ 06.0″
- Apparent magnitude (V): 4.29

Characteristics
- Evolutionary stage: subgiant
- Spectral type: F9IV-V
- U−B color index: +0.08
- B−V color index: +0.58

Astrometry
Radial velocity (R_{v})	+27.8±0.5 km/s
Proper motion (μ)	RA: −232.563 mas/yr Dec.: −481.472 mas/yr
Parallax (π)	71.8370±0.01503 mas
Distance	45.402 ± 0.009 ly (13.920 ± 0.003 pc)
Absolute magnitude (M_{V})	+3.60

Details
Mass	1.139±0.016 M_{☉}
Radius	1.609±0.042 R_{☉}
Luminosity	2.84±0.16 L_{☉}
Surface gravity (log g)	3.94±0.05 cgs
Temperature	5,917±18 K
Metallicity [Fe/H]	−0.08±0.01 dex
Rotation	17.6 days
Rotational velocity (v sin i)	2.4 km/s
Age	5.7±0.4 Gyr

Other designations
- 10 Tau, BD−00°572, FK5 1101, GJ 147, HD 22484, HIP 16852, HR 1101, SAO 111292, LHS 1569, LTT 11194

Database references
SIMBAD	data

10 Tauri is a single star in the zodiac constellation of Taurus. It can be seen with the naked eye, having an apparent visual magnitude of 4.29. An annual parallax shift of 71.62 mas provides a distance estimate of 45.5 light years. It is moving further from the Sun with a radial velocity of +28 km/s and has a relatively high proper motion.

The star has a stellar classification of F9IV-V, indicating that it is an F-type star between main sequence and subgiant. Models indicate that it is a subgiant, having exhausted its core hydrogen and evolved away from the main sequence. It is around 5.7 billion years old with a rotation period of 17.6 days. The star has 1.14 times the mass of the Sun and 1.61 times the Sun's radius. It is radiating 2.84 times the Sun's luminosity from its photosphere at an effective temperature of 5,917 K.

A debris disk has been identified orbiting 10 Tauri, based on excess infrared radiation detected by IRAS/ISO.

10 Tauri was the brightest star in the obsolete constellation Psalterium Georgii (Harpa Georgii).
