= 126 Tauri =

Star in the constellation Taurus

- Location of 126 Tauri (circled in red)

Observation data Epoch J2000 Equinox ICRS
- Constellation: Taurus
- Right ascension: 05^{h} 41^{m} 17.71768^{s}
- Declination: +16° 32′ 02.9253″
- Apparent magnitude (V): 4.836 (5.04 / 6.56)

Characteristics
- Spectral type: B3 IV
- U−B color index: −0.64
- B−V color index: −0.12

Astrometry
Radial velocity (R_{v})	+21.90±0.9 km/s
Proper motion (μ)	RA: +3.50 mas/yr Dec.: −15.47 mas/yr
Parallax (π)	5.13±0.81 mas
Distance	approx. 600 ly (approx. 190 pc)

Orbit
Primary	A
Name	B
Period (P)	118±7 yr
Semi-major axis (a)	0.185±0.007″
Eccentricity (e)	0.78±0.01
Inclination (i)	68.9±0.7°
Longitude of the node (Ω)	63.5±0.8°
Periastron epoch (T)	61118±35
Argument of periastron (ω) (secondary)	338±4°

Orbit
Primary	Ba
Name	Bb
Period (P)	4.77095±0.00023 d
Semi-major axis (a)	0.055±0.013 mas
Eccentricity (e)	0.0
Inclination (i)	30±19°
Longitude of the node (Ω)	310±14°
Periastron epoch (T)	59529.10±0.01
Argument of periastron (ω) (secondary)	0.0°
Semi-amplitude (K_{1}) (primary)	72.9±0.3 km/s

Details

A
Mass	6.14 M_{☉}
Luminosity	2,061 L_{☉}
Temperature	17,900 K

Ba
Mass	3.19 M_{☉}

Bb
Mass	1.65 M_{☉}

Other designations
- BD+16°841, HD 37711, HIP 26777, HR 1946, SAO 94759

Database references
SIMBAD	data

126 Tauri (126 Tau) is a triple star system in the constellation Taurus, approximately 600 light years away. Its apparent magnitude is 4.83, making it visible to the naked eye with dark skies.

126 Tauri is a well-known binary star with the two components in an eccentric orbit of over a hundred years. The secondary, component B, has also shown radial velocity variations that indicate an unseen companion in a 4.77-day orbit.

The combined spectral class is typically quoted as B3IV, occasionally B3V. The primary alone has been classed as B3V, although the two components have been individually measured at B8V and B7V.
