= Delta2 Tauri =

Star in the constellation Taurus

Delta^{2} Tauri
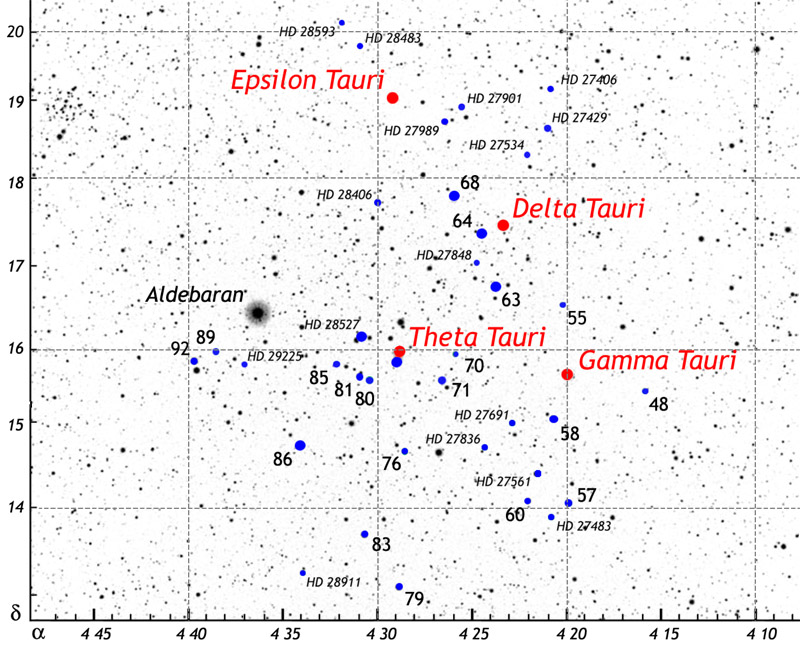
- Location of δ^{2} Tauri in the Hyades, indicated by its Flamsteed designation 64

Observation data Epoch J2000.0 Equinox J2000.0 (ICRS)
- Constellation: Taurus
- Right ascension: 04^{h} 24^{m} 05.75985^{s}
- Declination: +17° 26′ 38.8583″
- Apparent magnitude (V): +4.80

Characteristics
- Evolutionary stage: main sequence
- Spectral type: A2 Vs
- U−B color index: +0.12
- B−V color index: +0.15

Astrometry
Radial velocity (R_{v})	+37.1 km/s
Proper motion (μ)	RA: +108.16 mas/yr Dec.: −34.66 mas/yr
Parallax (π)	20.21±0.40 mas
Distance	161 ± 3 ly (49.5 ± 1.0 pc)
Absolute magnitude (M_{V})	+1.62

Details
Mass	1.79 M_{☉}
Radius	1.8 R_{☉}
Luminosity	27 L_{☉}
Surface gravity (log g)	4.15 cgs
Temperature	7,997 K
Metallicity [Fe/H]	+0.14 dex
Rotational velocity (v sin i)	42 km/s
Age	449 Myr

Other designations
- δ^{2} Tau, 64 Tauri, BD+17°714, HD 27819, HIP 20542, HR 1380, SAO 93907

Database references
SIMBAD	data

Delta^{2} Tauri (δ^{2} Tauri) is a solitary, white-hued star in the zodiac constellation of Taurus. Based upon an annual parallax shift of 20.21 mas as seen from Earth, it is located roughly 161 light years distant from the Sun. It is separated from δ^{1} Tauri by 0.3° on the sky and is faintly visible to the naked eye with an apparent visual magnitude of +4.80. The star is considered a member of the Hyades cluster.

At the estimated age of 449 million years, this is an A-type main-sequence star with a stellar classification of A2 Vs, where the 's' suffix indicates narrow (sharp) absorption lines. It has 1.8 times the mass of the Sun and about 1.8 times the Sun's radius. The star is radiating 27 times the Sun's luminosity from its photosphere at an effective temperature of 7,997 K.

δ^{2} Tauri is a source of X-ray emission with a luminosity of 101.1×10^{20} W. Since A-type stars are not normally a source of X-rays, this emission may be coming from an unknown companion or from a line of sight source.
