= 109 Tauri =

Star in the constellation Taurus

- Location of 109 Tauri (circled in red)

Observation data Epoch J2000 Equinox ICRS
- Constellation: Taurus
- Right ascension: 05^{h} 19^{m} 16.60169^{s}
- Declination: +22° 05′ 47.3740″
- Apparent magnitude (V): 4.96

Characteristics
- Spectral type: G8 III
- B−V color index: 0.937±0.001

Astrometry
Radial velocity (R_{v})	+19.03±0.01 km/s
Proper motion (μ)	RA: +18.91 mas/yr Dec.: −81.57 mas/yr
Parallax (π)	13.19±0.30 mas
Distance	247 ± 6 ly (76 ± 2 pc)
Absolute magnitude (M_{V})	0.56

Details
Mass	2.47±0.08 M_{☉}
Radius	8.14±0.46 R_{☉}
Luminosity	60+10 −12 L_{☉}
Surface gravity (log g)	2.96±0.01 cgs
Temperature	5,035±23 K
Metallicity [Fe/H]	0.10±0.04 dex
Rotational velocity (v sin i)	1.15±0.62 km/s
Age	600±50 Myr

Other designations
- n Tau, 109 Tau, BD+21°816, FK5 2398, HD 34559, HIP 24822, HR 1739, SAO 77097

Database references
SIMBAD	data

109 Tauri, or n Tauri, is a single, yellow-hued star in the zodiac constellation of Taurus. It has an apparent visual magnitude of 4.96 and is faintly visible to the naked eye. The star has an annual parallax shift of 13.19±0.30 mas, putting it around 247 light years from the Sun. At that distance, the visual magnitude is diminished by an extinction of 0.24 due to interstellar dust. It is moving further from the Sun with a heliocentric radial velocity of +19 km/s.

This is an evolved giant star with a stellar classification of G8 III, having consumed the hydrogen at its core and moved off the main sequence. At the age of 600 million years, it has become a red clump giant, indicating that it is on the horizontal branch and is generating energy through helium fusion at its core. The star has an estimated 2.47 times the mass of the Sun and has expanded to around eight times the Sun's radius. It is radiating about 60 times the Sun's luminosity from its enlarged photosphere at an effective temperature of 5,035 K.
