= 44 Tauri =

Variable star in the constellation Taurus

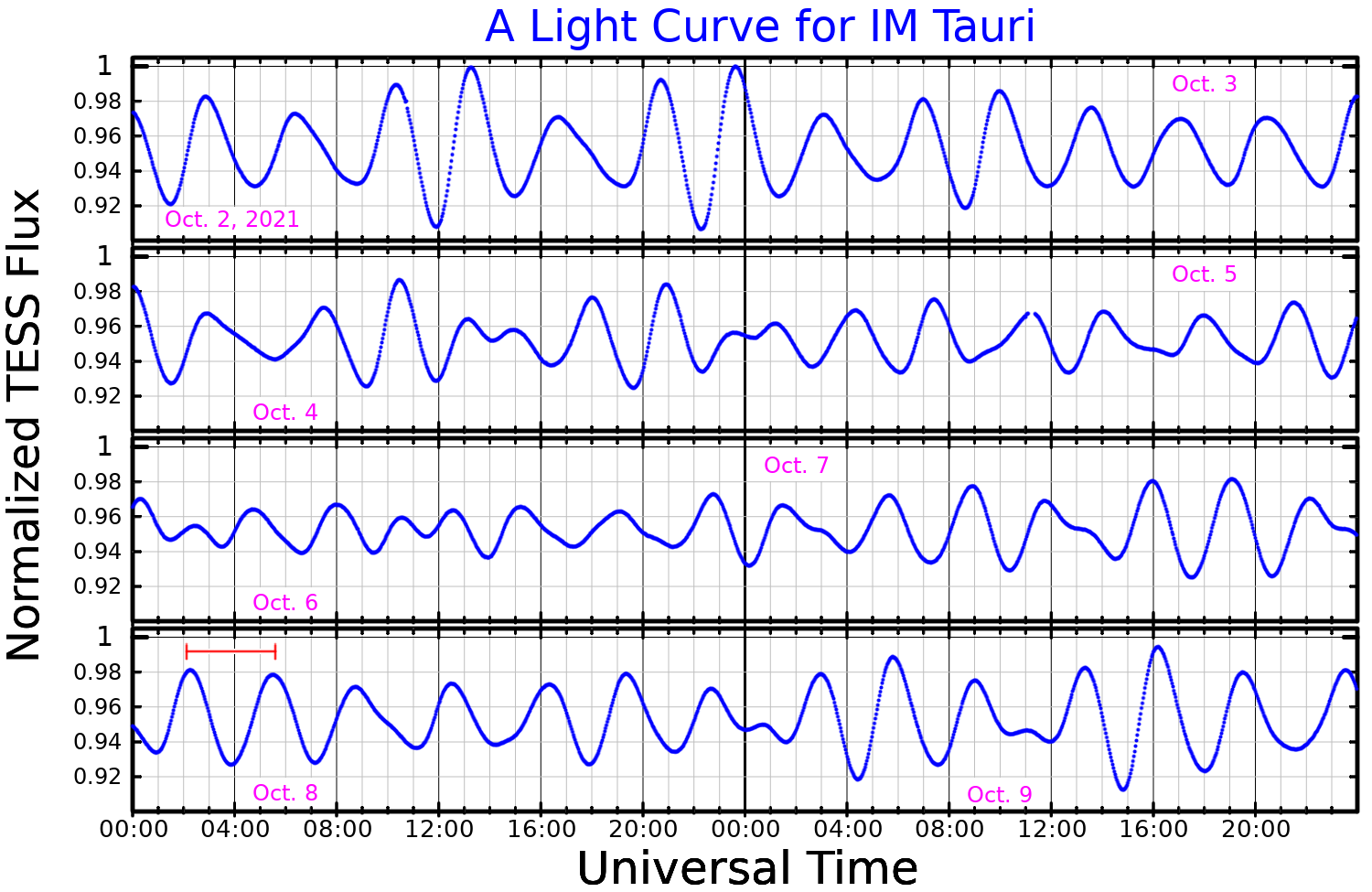
- A light curve for IM Tauri, plotted from TESS data. The 3.479 hour period is marked in red.

Observation data Epoch J2000.0 Equinox ICRS
- Constellation: Taurus
- Right ascension: 04^{h} 10^{m} 49.86084^{s}
- Declination: +26° 28′ 51.4365″
- Apparent magnitude (V): 5.37 - 5.58

Characteristics
- Evolutionary stage: main sequence
- Spectral type: F2 IV
- Variable type: δ Scuti

Astrometry
Radial velocity (R_{v})	17.43±0.64 km/s
Proper motion (μ)	RA: −30.919±0.123 mas/yr Dec.: −35.105±0.072 mas/yr
Parallax (π)	15.4199±0.0863 mas
Distance	212 ± 1 ly (64.9 ± 0.4 pc)
Absolute magnitude (M_{V})	1.44±0.16

Details

Primary
Mass	1.89 M_{☉}
Surface gravity (log g)	3.6±0.1 cgs
Temperature	7000±200 K
Rotational velocity (v sin i)	2±1 km/s

Other designations
- p Tauri, IM Tauri, BD+26 411, HIP 19513, HD 26322, HR 1287, SAO 76485

Database references
SIMBAD	data

44 Tauri, also known as HR 1287 and IM Tauri, is a star located about 210 light years from the Earth, in the constellation Taurus. It is a 5th magnitude star, making it faintly visible to the naked eye of an observer located far from city lights. It is a Delta Scuti variable star, ranging between magnitude 5.37 and 5.58 over a period of about 3.5 hours.

In 1966, Ivan Danziger and Robert Dickens discovered that 44 Tauri was a low amplitude variable star, with a period of approximately 3.22 hours. In a follow-up study published the next year, they reported that the period was irregular, indicating beat phenomena, and they classified it as a δ Scuti variable. In 1968, 44 Tauri was given the variable star designation IM Tauri.

44 Tauri has been a popular object for detailed astroseismic and spectroscopic studies, because its very slow (relative to other δ Scuti stars) rotation speed of 3±2 km/sec does not complicate pulsation mode identification or greatly broaden spectral lines. As of 2010, 44 Tauri had been found to pulsate with 15 independent periods, ranging from 1.89 to 4.52 hours.
