= Psi Tauri =

Star in the constellation Taurus

- Location of ψ Tauri (circled in red)

Observation data Epoch J2000.0 Equinox J2000.0 (ICRS)
- Constellation: Taurus
- Right ascension: 04^{h} 07^{m} 00.45695^{s}
- Declination: +29° 00′ 04.7093″
- Apparent magnitude (V): +5.22

Characteristics
- Evolutionary stage: main sequence
- Spectral type: F1 V
- U−B color index: −0.01
- B−V color index: +0.34

Astrometry
Radial velocity (R_{v})	+9.15±0.42 km/s
Proper motion (μ)	RA: −91.661 mas/yr Dec.: +8.096 mas/yr
Parallax (π)	35.9320±0.1055 mas
Distance	90.8 ± 0.3 ly (27.83 ± 0.08 pc)
Absolute magnitude (M_{V})	3.01

Details
Mass	1.59 M_{☉}
Radius	1.4 R_{☉}
Luminosity	5.2 L_{☉}
Surface gravity (log g)	4.36±0.14 cgs
Temperature	6,856 K
Metallicity [Fe/H]	−0.20 dex
Rotational velocity (v sin i)	45.4±2.3 km/s
Age	1.435 Gyr

Other designations
- ψ Tau, 42 Tau, BD+28°619, FK5 2295, HD 25867, HIP 19205, HR 1269, SAO 76461

Database references
SIMBAD	data

Psi Tauri, which is Latinized from ψ Tauri, is a solitary star in the zodiac constellation of Taurus. It has a yellow-white hue and is visible to the naked eye with an apparent visual magnitude of +5.22. The distance to this system, as determined using an annual parallax shift of 36.2 mas as seen from the Earth, is 91 light years. It is drifting further away with a radial velocity of +9 km/s.

This object is an F-type main sequence star with a stellar classification of F1 V, which indicates it is undergoing core hydrogen fusion. It is about 1.4 billion years old and is spinning with a projected rotational velocity of 45 km/s. The star has 1.6 times the mass of the Sun and 1.4 times its radius. It is radiating 4.8 times the Sun's luminosity from its photosphere at an effective temperature of 7,088 K.
